= War memorial =

Type of memorial

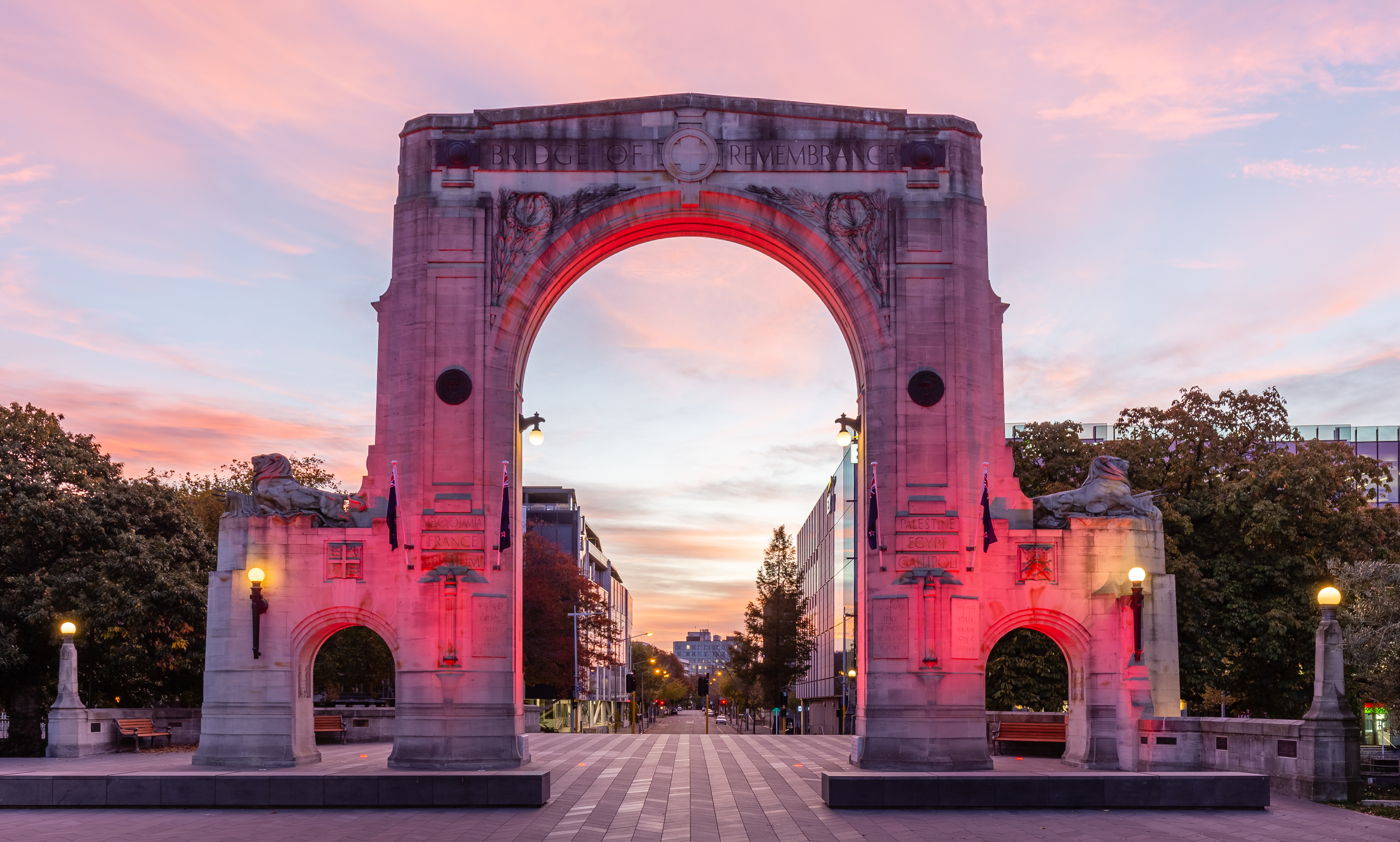
Bridge of Remembrance in Christchurch, New Zealand

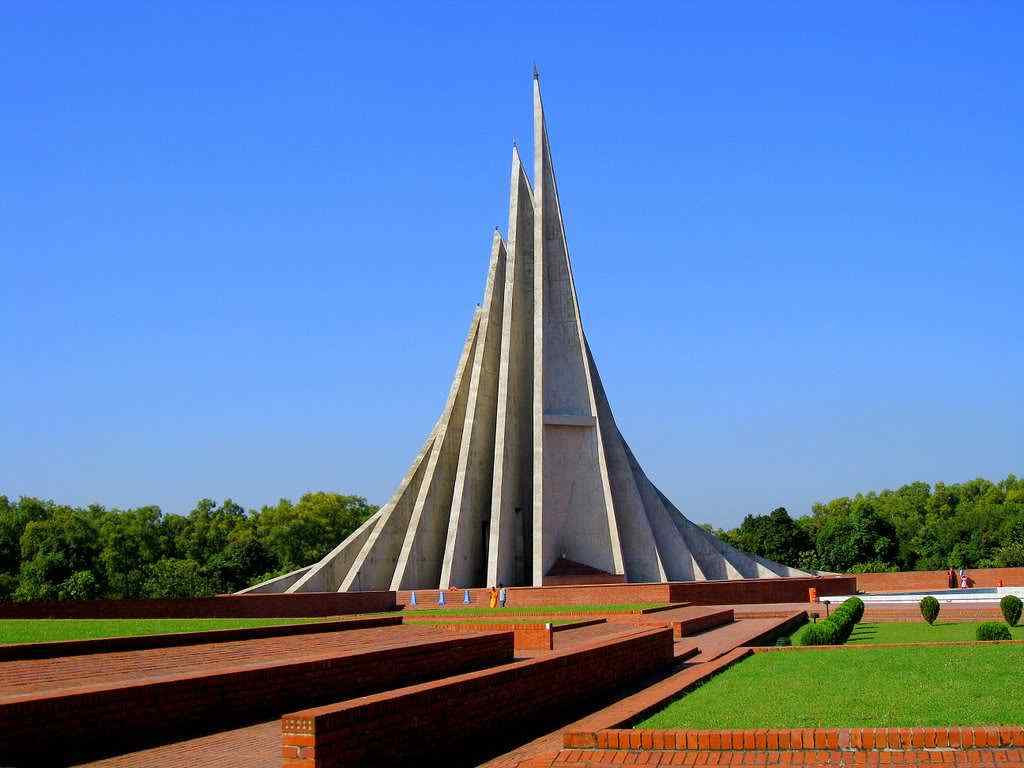
Jatiyo Smriti Soudho in Bangladesh commemorates those who gave their lives in the Bangladesh Liberation War of 1971

Monument for the defenders of Jerusalem in 1948 dedicated to Israeli soldiers who fought for the liberation of the Jewish Quarter of Jerusalem during the 1948 Arab–Israeli War

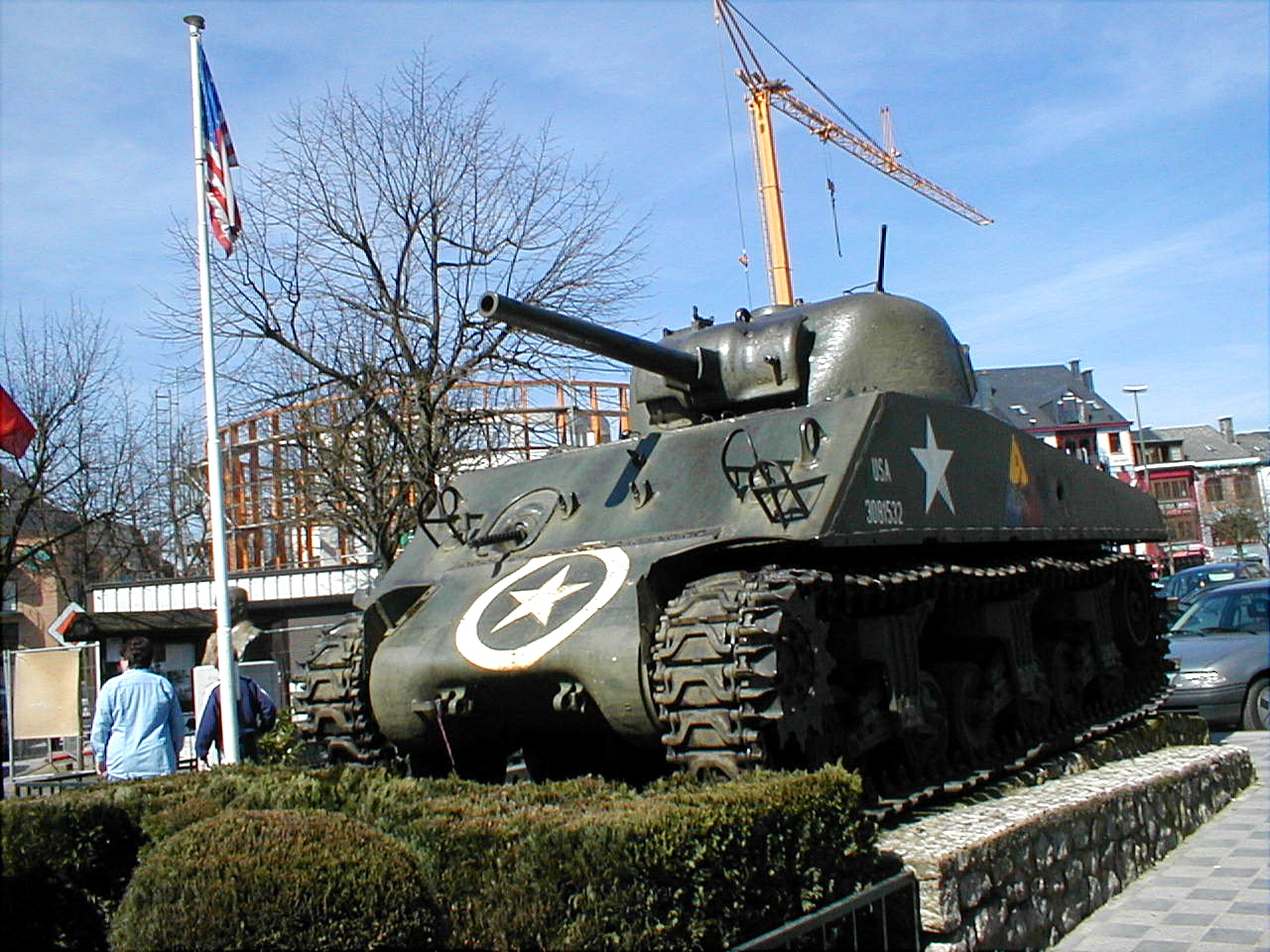
An M4 Sherman tank in the centre of Bastogne, Belgium

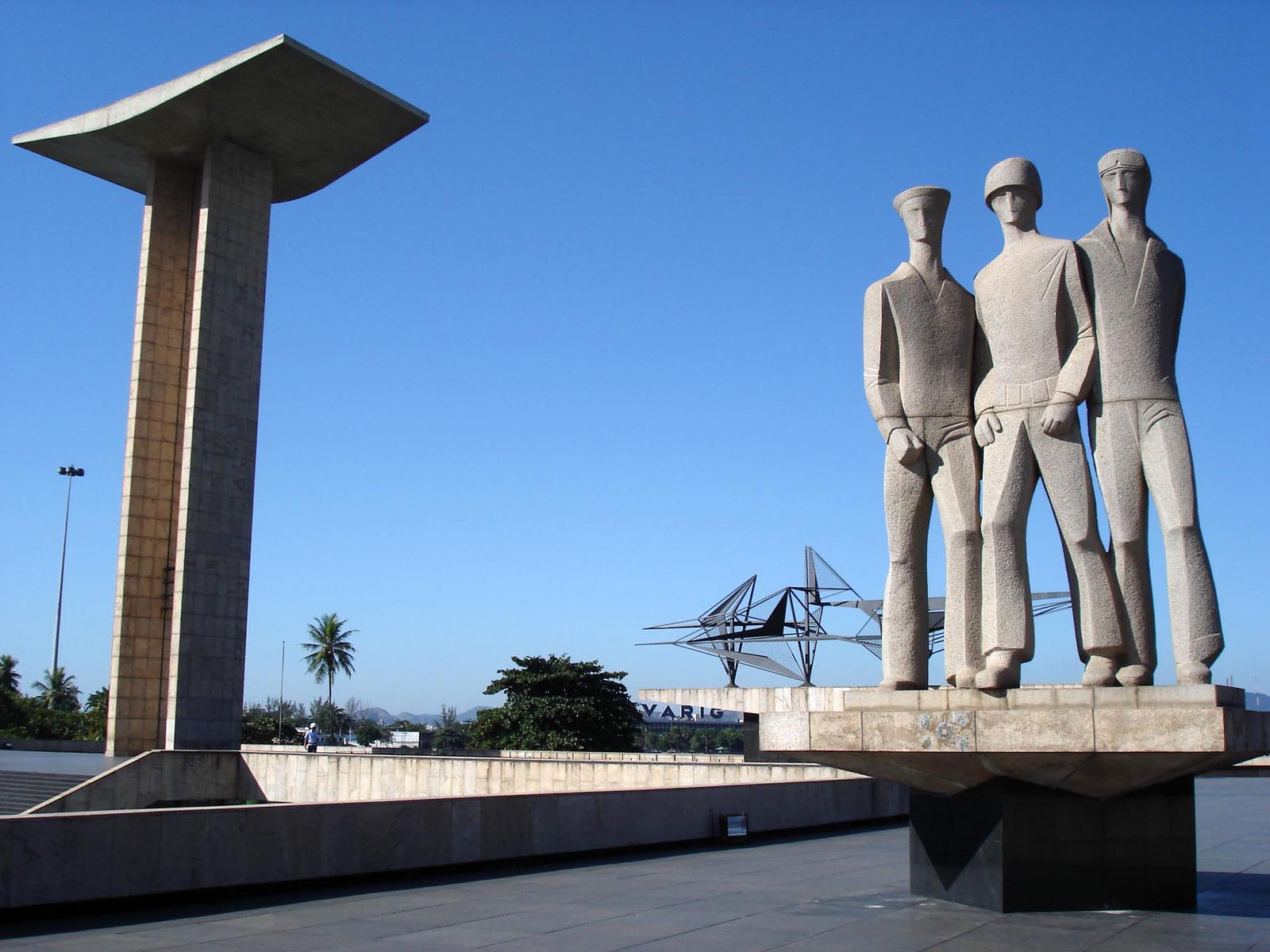
The Monument to the dead of World War II commemorates Brazil's participation and losses in the Second World War

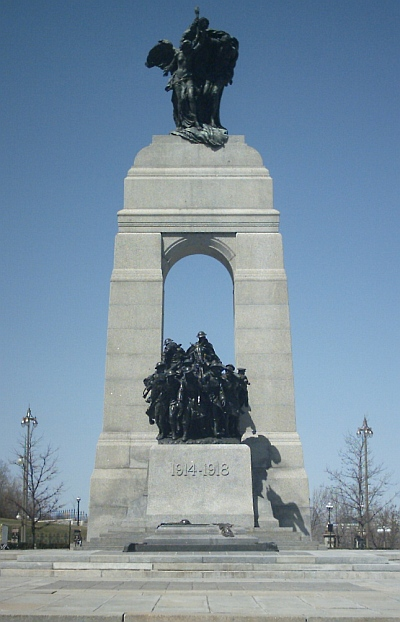
The National War Memorial in Ottawa, Ontario, Canada

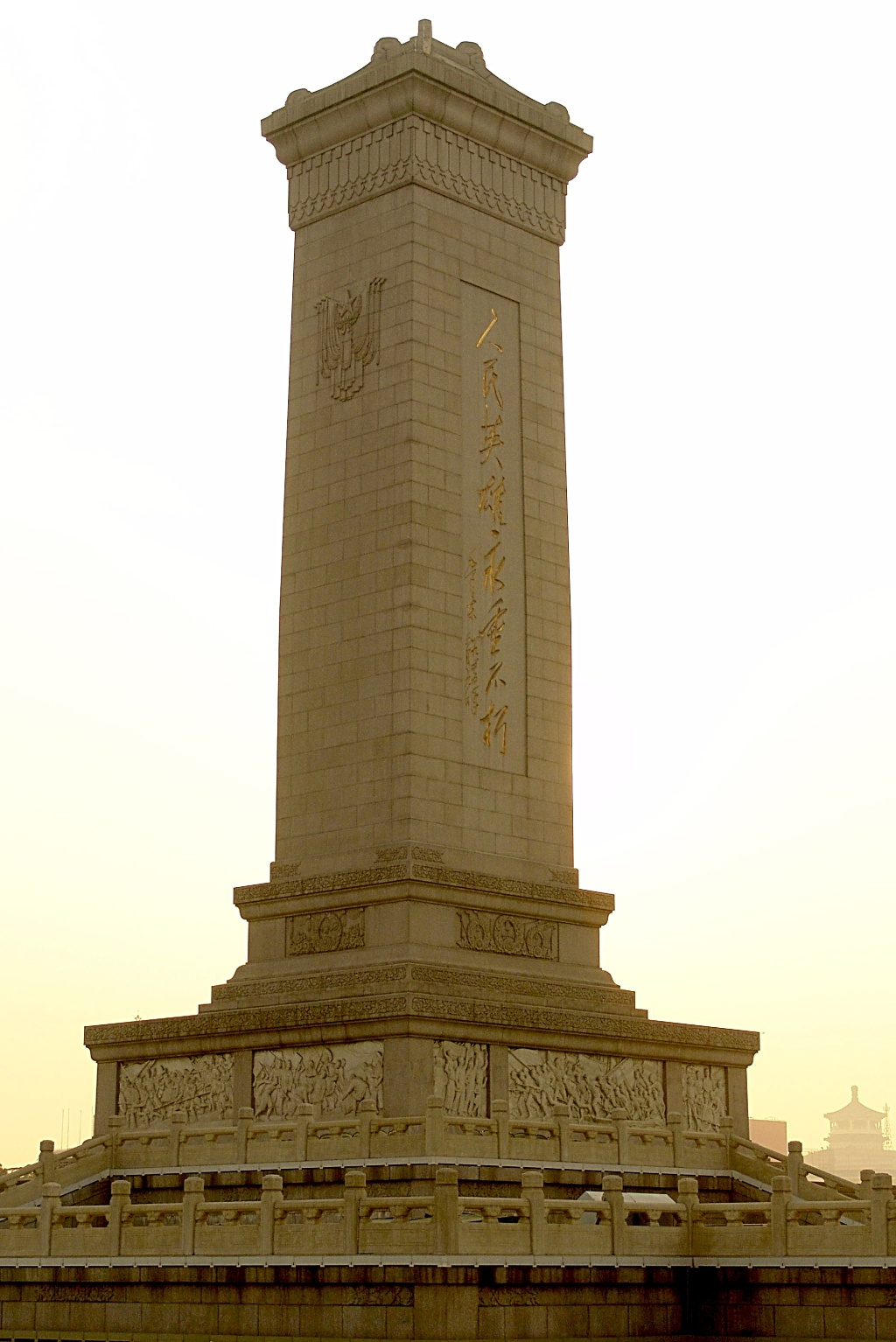
The Monument to the People's Heroes in Beijing, China

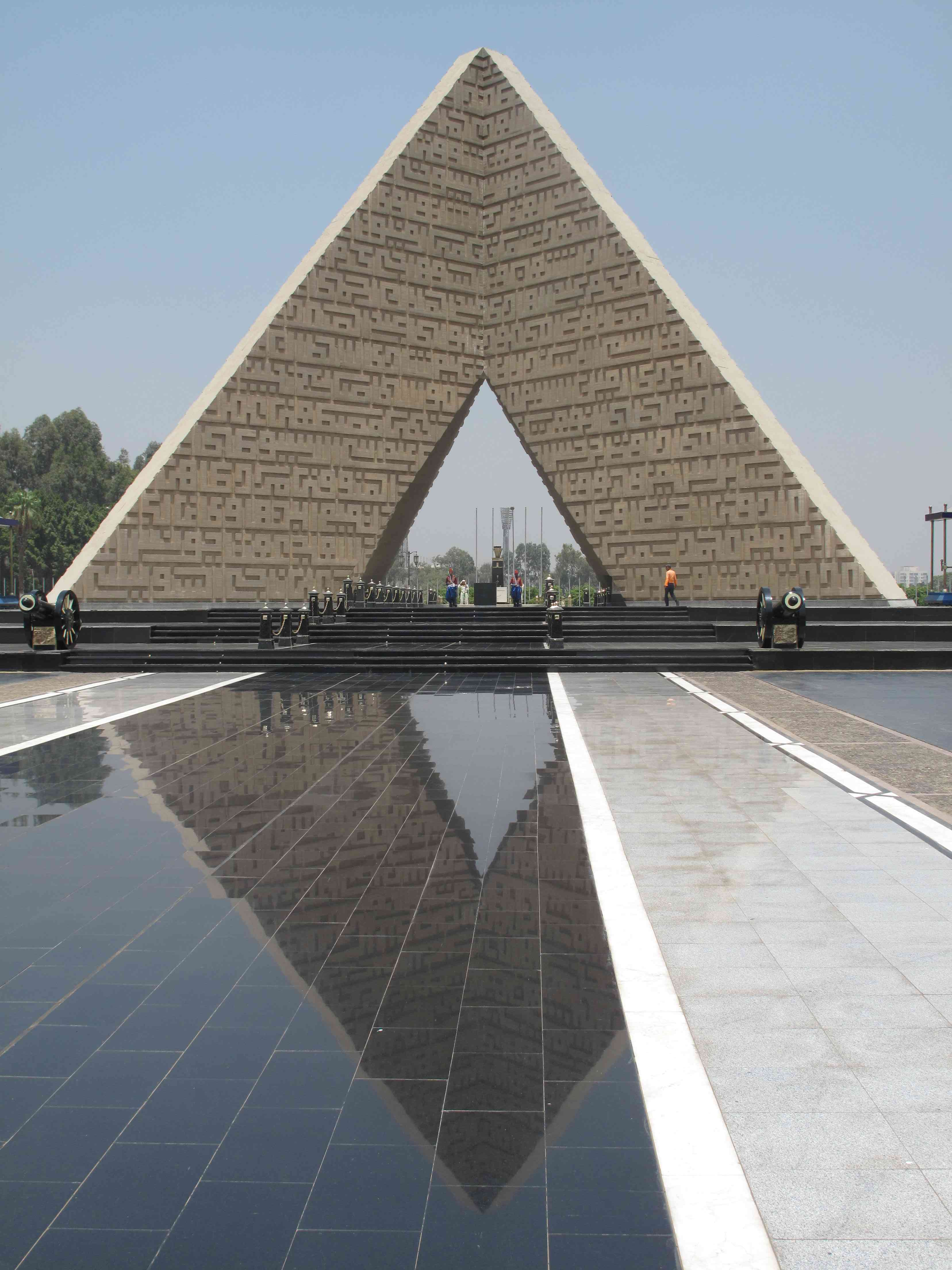
The Unknown Soldier Memorial in Cairo, Egypt honours Egyptians and Arabs who lost their lives in the 1973 October War.

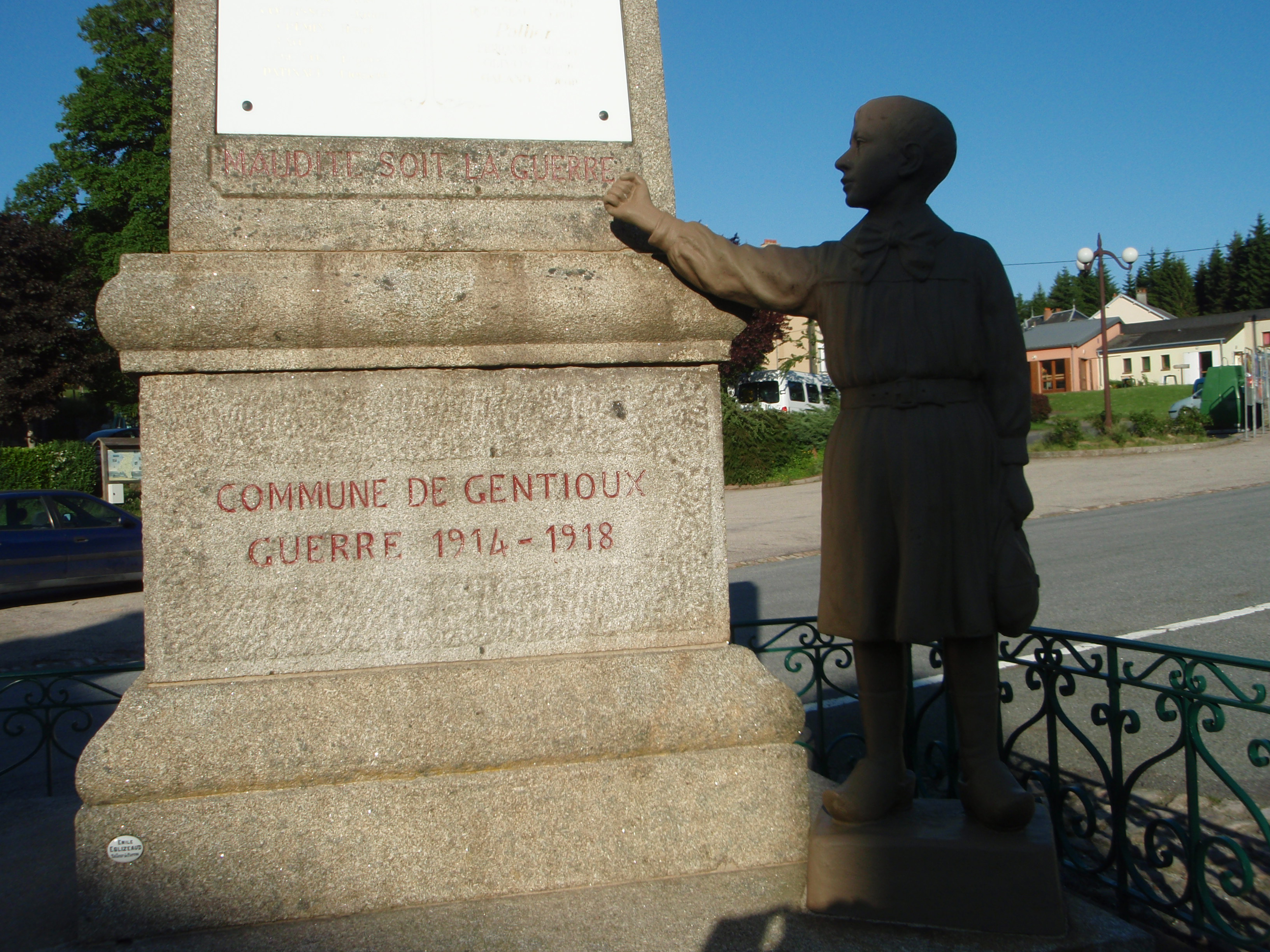
Pacifist memorial at Gentioux, France with the inscription Maudite soit la guerre (Cursed be war)

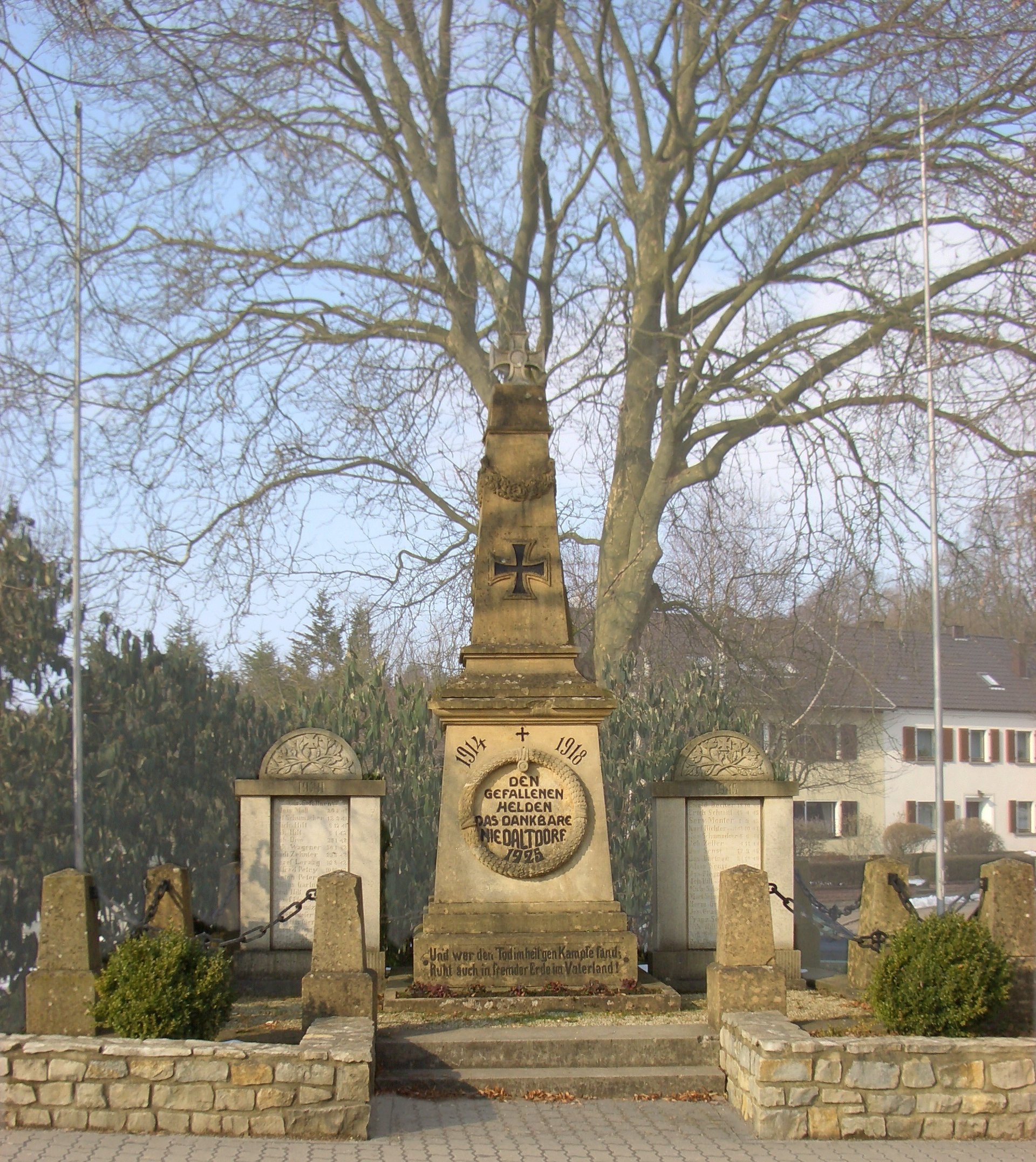
German memorial commemorating soldiers from the town of Niederaltdorf who died in World War I

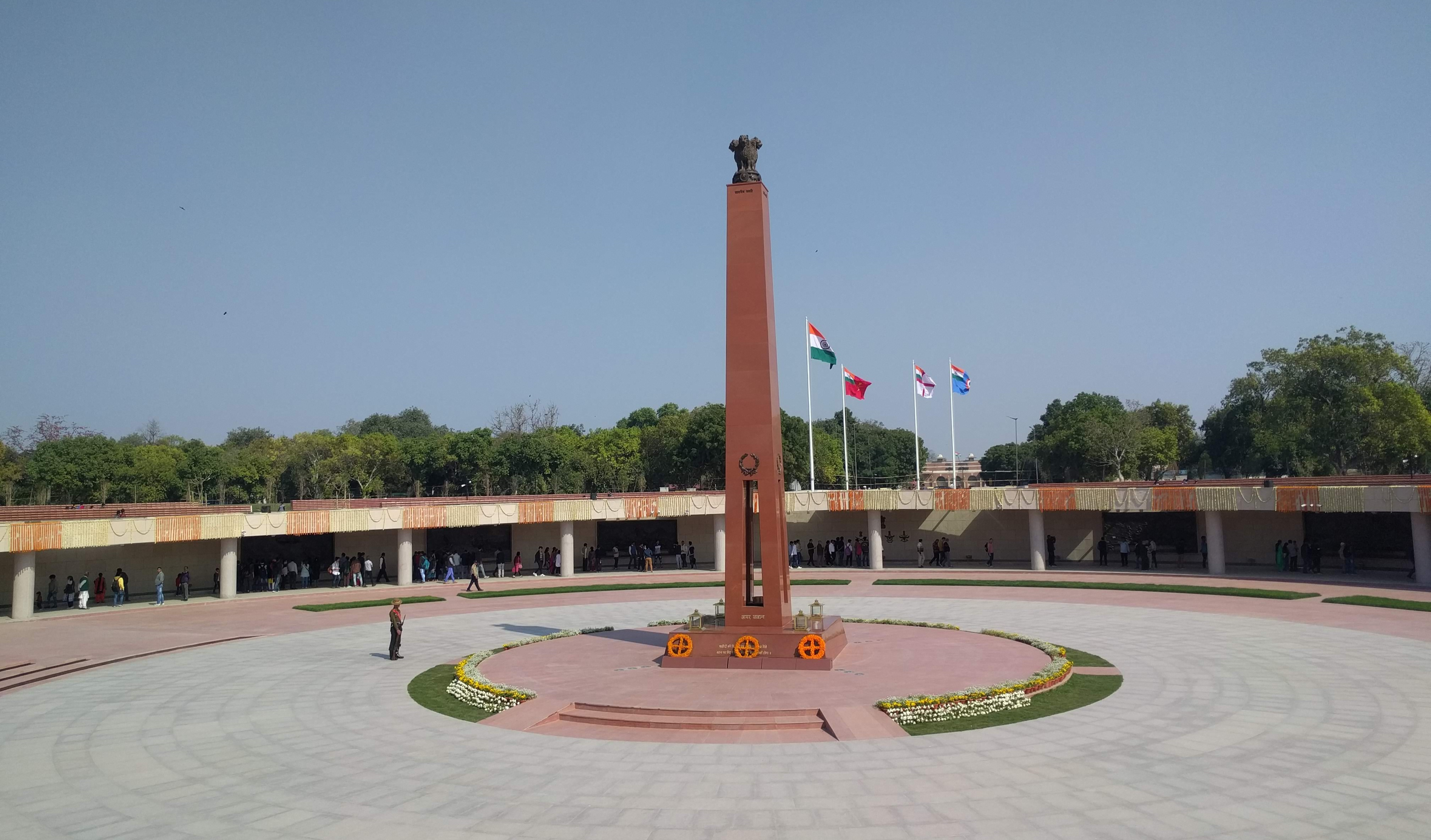
National War Memorial (India) in New Delhi, India

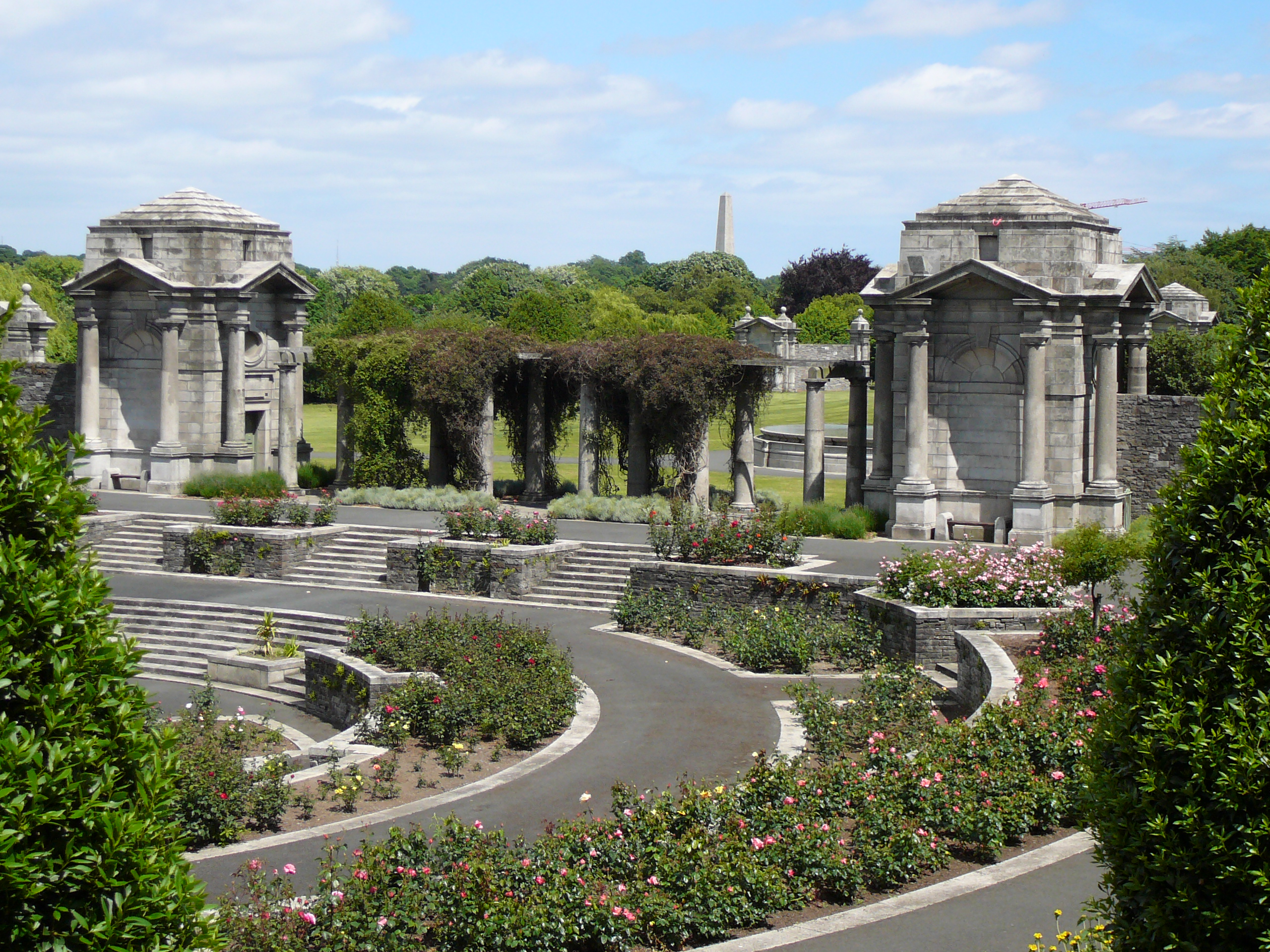
The Irish National War Memorial Gardens in Dublin, Ireland honour Irish soldiers who gave their lives in the First World War, as well as those who fought in Irish regiments of the various Allied armies

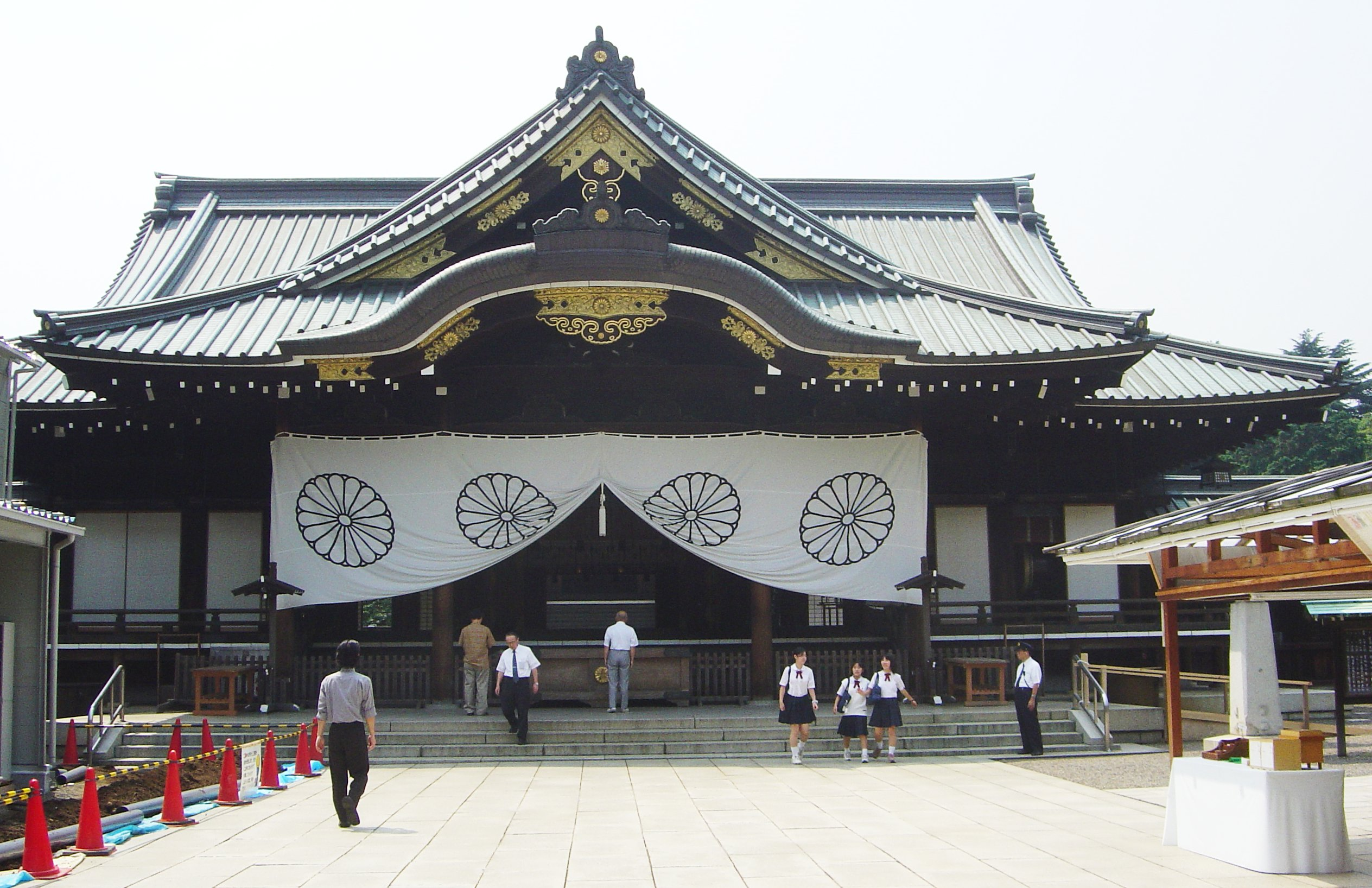
The Yasukuni Shrine in Japan

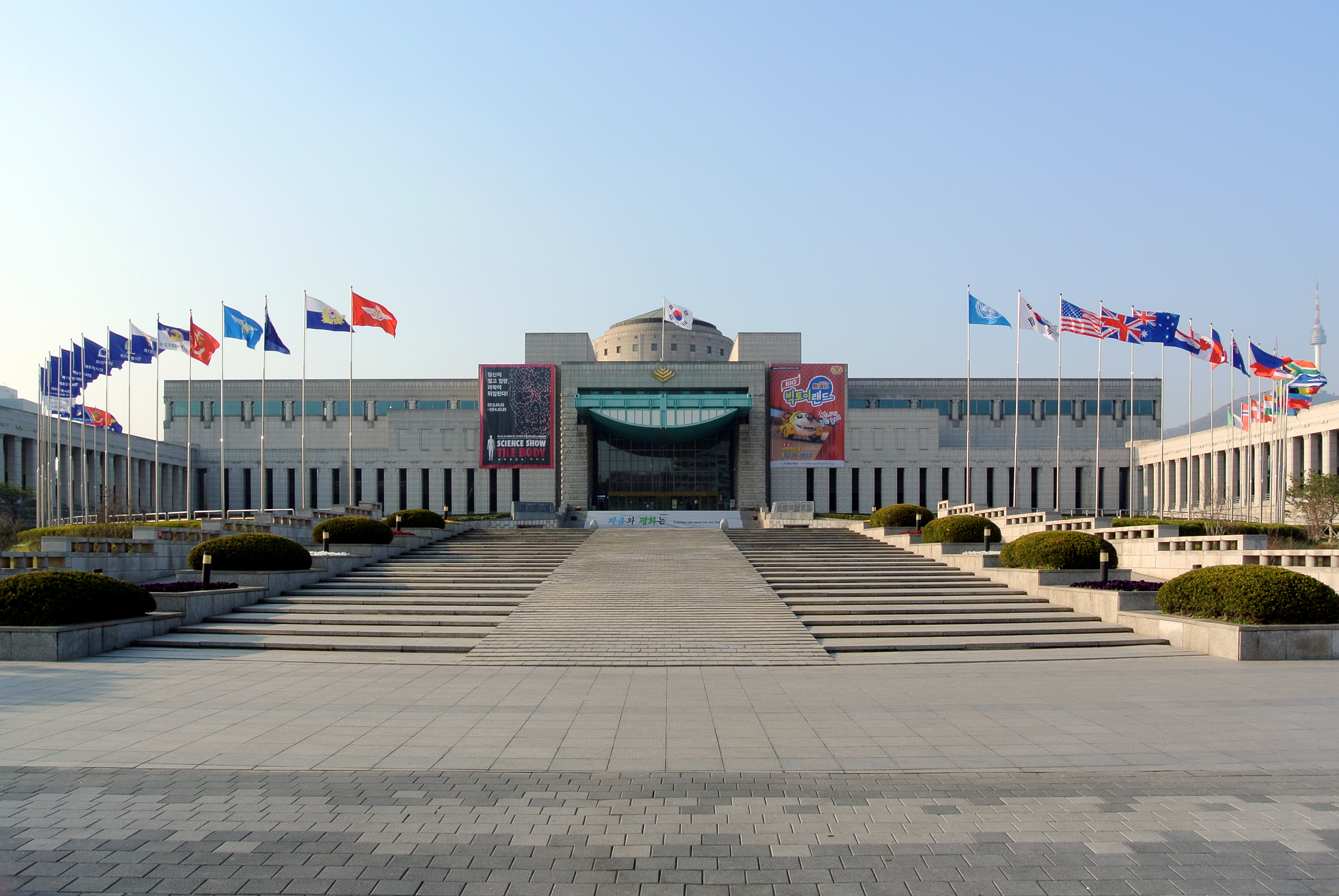
Main building and museum of the War Memorial of Korea

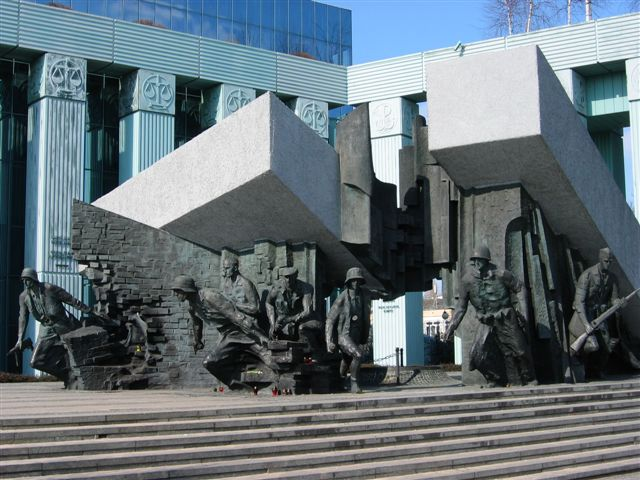
Monument to the Heroes of the Warsaw Uprising in Poland.

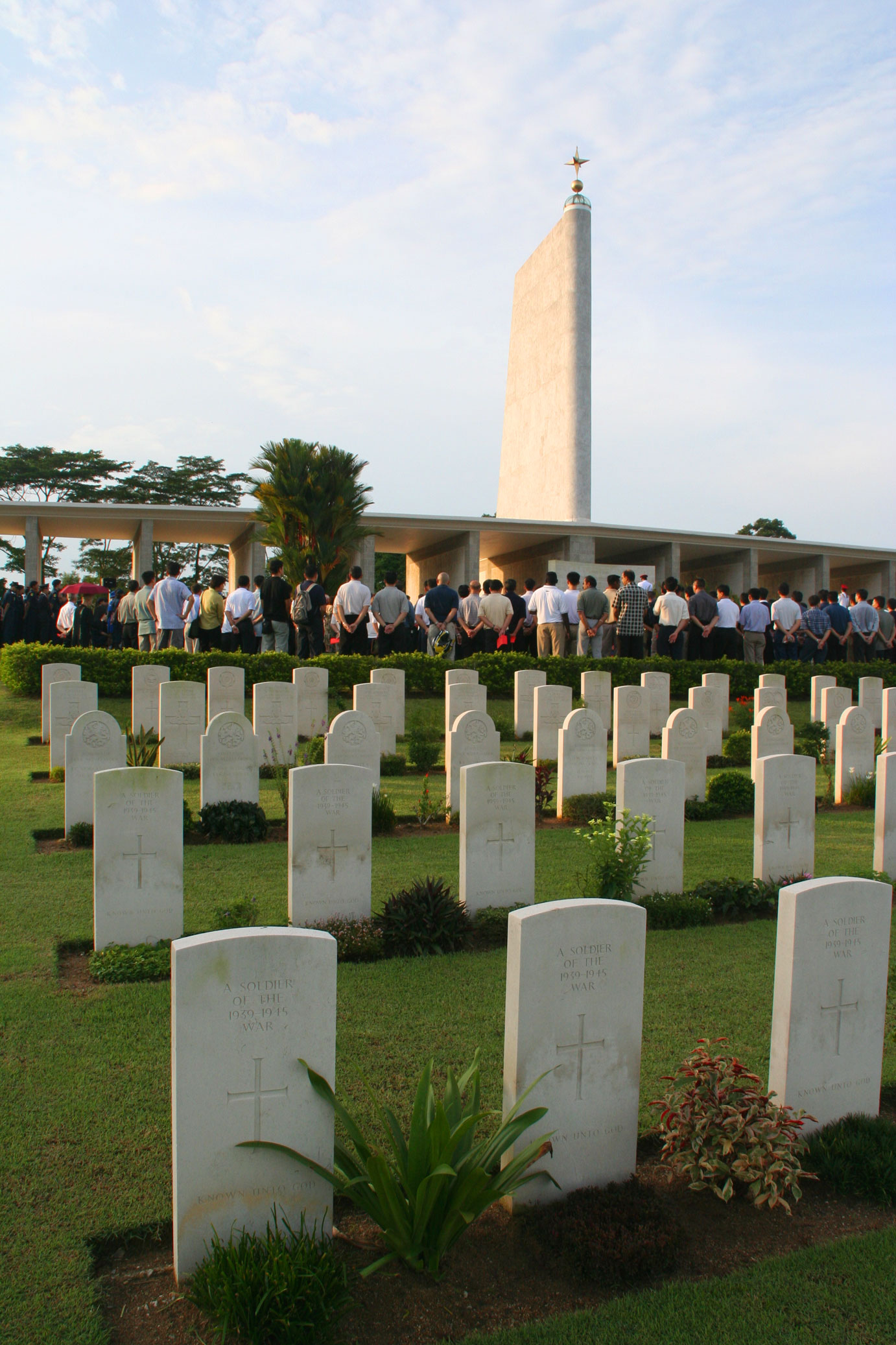
The Kranji War Cemetery in Singapore is the final resting place for Allied soldiers who perished during the Battle of Singapore and the subsequent Japanese occupation of the island

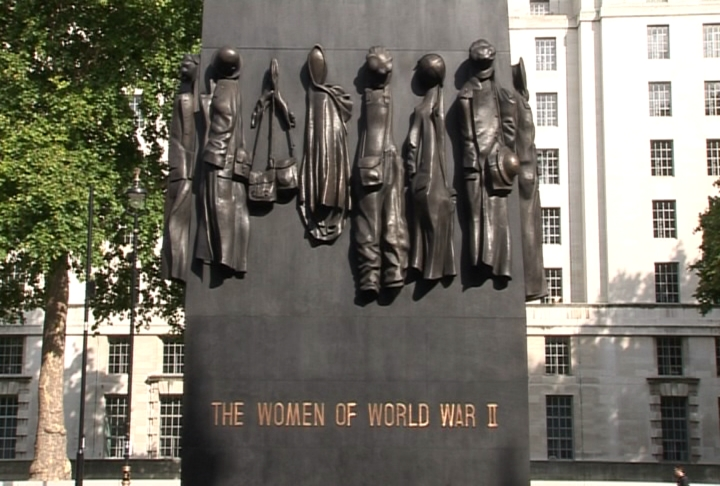
Monument to the Women of World War II in London, United Kingdom

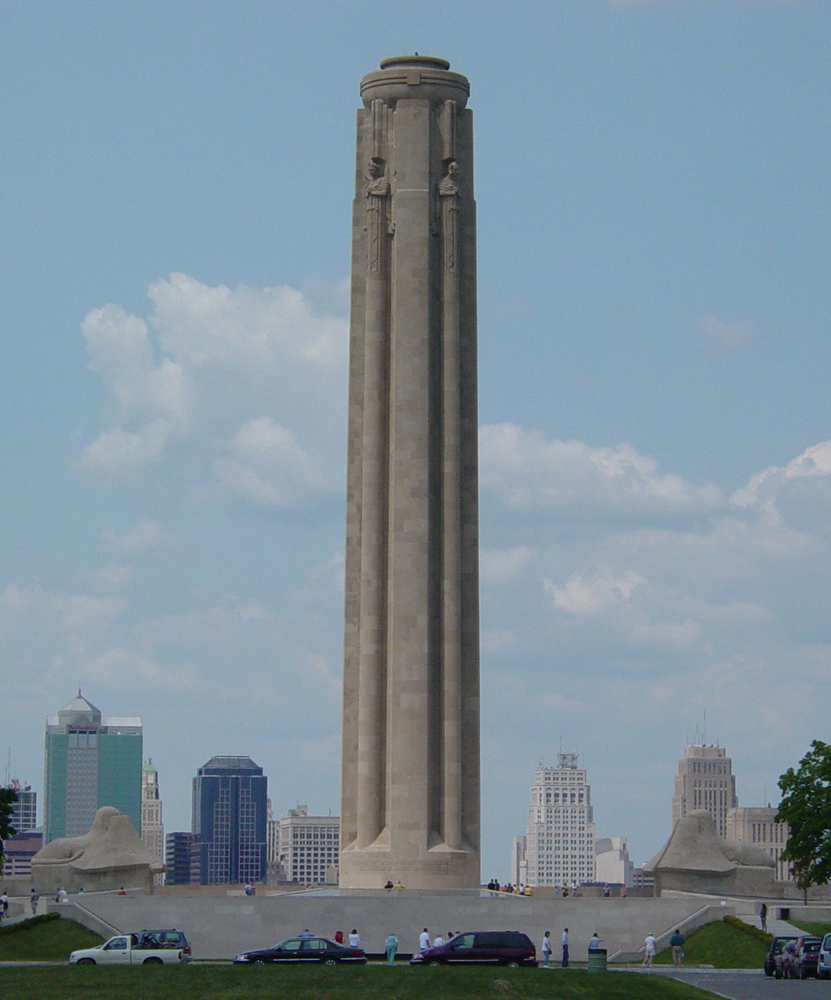
The Liberty Memorial, National World War I Memorial of the USA in Kansas City, Missouri

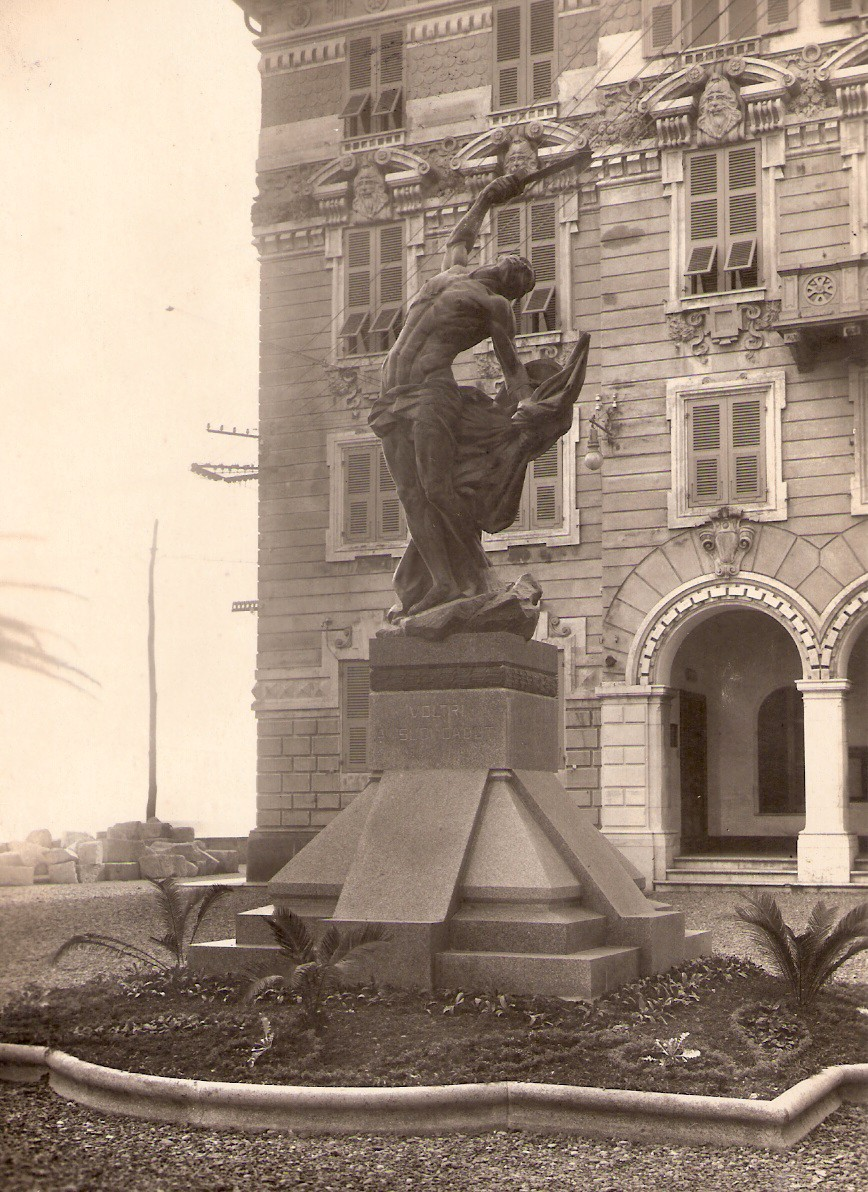
Original 1915 war memorial in Genoa Voltri (Italy); sculptor Vittorio Lavezzari (1864–1938). The monument was melted down during the Second World War for its materials

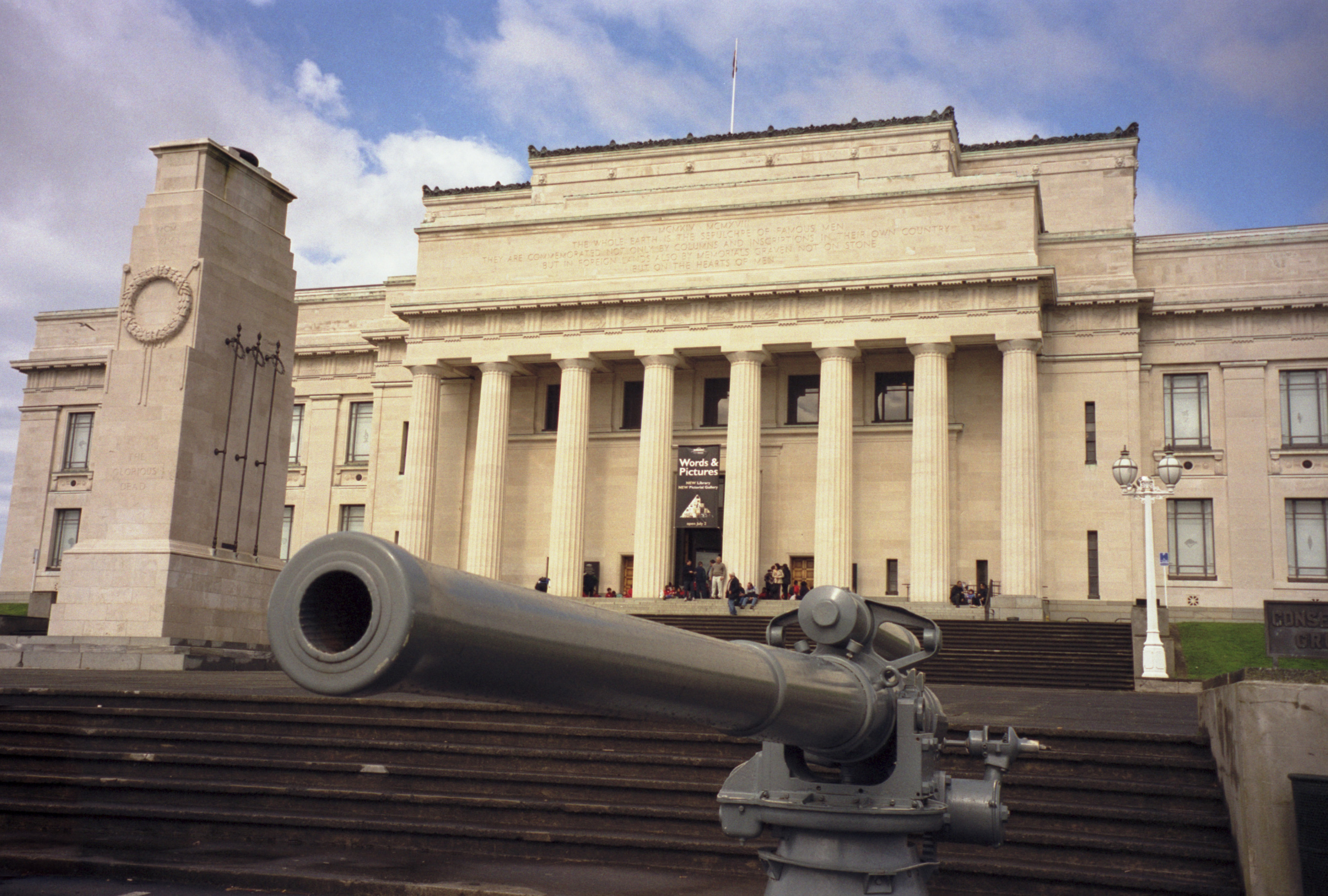
The Auckland War Memorial Museum in New Zealand with the cenotaph in front

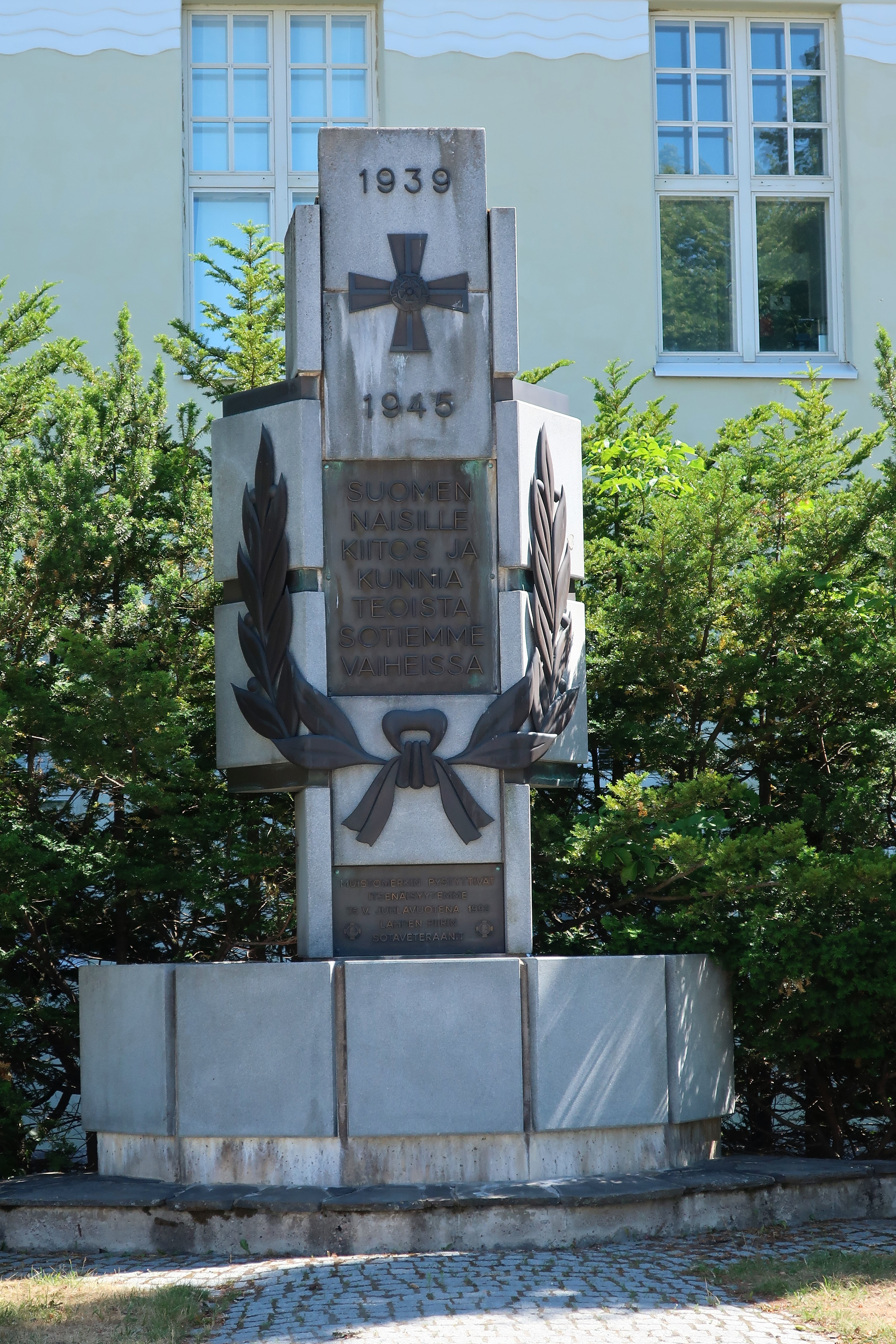
A war memorial erected in 1998 in Lahti, Finland

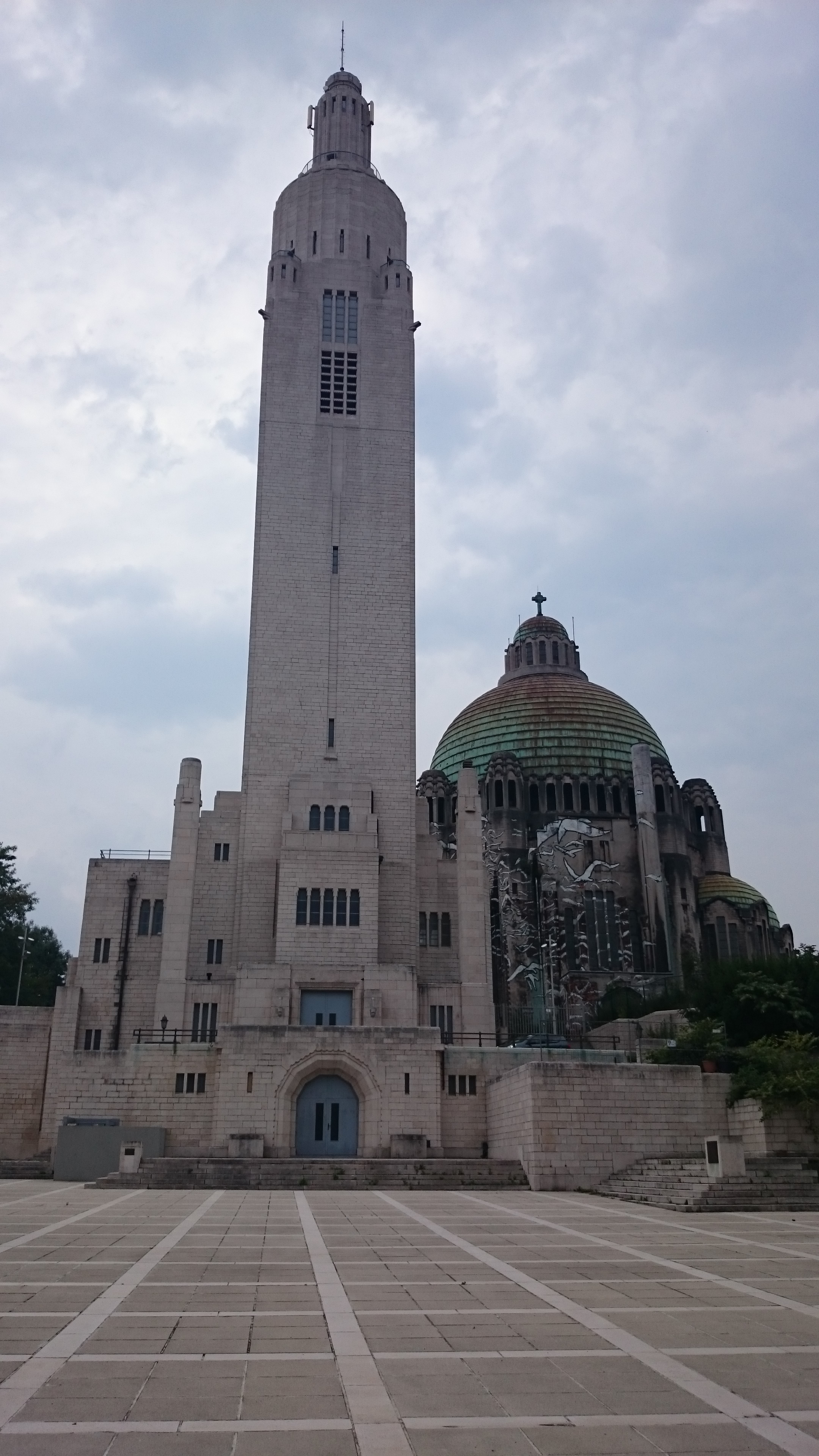
The Interallied Memorial of Cointe, Liège, Belgium

A war memorial is a building, monument, statue, or other edifice to celebrate a war or victory, or (predominating in modern times) to commemorate those who died or were injured in a war.

== Symbolism ==
=== Historical usage ===
It has been suggested that the world's earliest known war memorial is the White Monument at Tell Banat, Aleppo Governorate, Syria, which dates from the 3rd millennium BC and appears to have involved the systematic burial of fighters from a state army.

The Nizari Ismailis of the Alamut period (the Assassins) had made a secret roll of honor in Alamut Castle containing the names of the assassins and their victims during their uprising.

The oldest war memorial in the United Kingdom is Oxford University's All Souls College. It was founded in 1438 with the provision that its fellows should pray for those killed in the long wars with France.

War memorials for the Franco-Prussian War (1870–71) were the first in Europe to have rank-and-file soldiers commemorated by name. Every soldier that was killed was granted a permanent resting-place as part of the terms of the Treaty of Frankfurt (1871).

To commemorate the millions who died in World War I, war memorials became commonplace in communities large and small around the world.

=== Modern usage ===
In modern times the main intent of war memorials is not to glorify war, but to honor those who have died. Sometimes, as in the case of the Warsaw Genuflection of Willy Brandt, they may also serve as focal points of increasing understanding between previous enemies.

Using modern technology an international project is currently archiving all post-1914 Commonwealth war graves and Commonwealth War Graves Commission memorials to create a virtual memorial (see The War Graves Photographic Project for further details).

== History ==
=== World War I ===
During World War I, many nations saw massive devastation and loss of life. More people lost their lives in the east than in the west, but the outcome was different. In the west, and in response to the victory there obtained, most of the cities in the countries involved in the conflict erected memorials, with the memorials in smaller villages and towns often listing the names of each local soldier who had been killed in addition (so far as the decision by the French and British in 1916 to construct governmentally designed cemeteries was concerned) to their names being recorded on military headstones, often against the will of those directly involved, and without any opportunity of choice in the British Empire (whose war graves were administered by the Imperial War Graves Commission). Massive British monuments commemorating thousands of dead with no identified war grave, such as the Menin Gate at Ypres and the Thiepval memorial on the Somme, were also constructed.

The Liberty Memorial, located in Kansas City, Missouri, is a memorial dedicated to all Americans who served in the Great War. For various reasons connected with their character, the same may be said to apply to certain governmental memorials in the United Kingdom (The Cenotaph in London, relating to the Empire in general, and the Scottish National War Memorial in Edinburgh, also with a reference to the Empire, but with particular connections to the United Kingdom, having been opened by the Prince of Wales in 1927 and with the King and the Queen the first visitors and contributors of a casket of the Scottish names for addition within the Shrine). In Maryland, in the center of the city of Baltimore facing the Baltimore City Hall to the west is a geometric paved tree-lined plaza with the War Memorial Building to the east with a large marble decorated civic auditorium and historical and veterans museum below, designed by Laurence Hall Fowler, dedicated 1925.

=== Pacifist war memorials and those relating to war and peace ===
After World War I, some towns in France set up pacifist war memorials. Instead of commemorating the glorious dead, these memorials denounce war with figures of grieving widows and children rather than soldiers. Such memorials provoked anger among veterans and the military in general. The most famous is at Gentioux-Pigerolles in the department of Creuse. Below the column which lists the name of the fallen stands an orphan in bronze pointing to an inscription 'Maudite soit la guerre' (Cursed be war). Feelings ran so high that the memorial was not officially inaugurated until 1990 and soldiers at the nearby army camp were under orders to turn their heads when they walked past. Another such memorial is in the small town of Équeurdreville-Hainneville (formerly Équeurdreville) in the department of Manche. Here the statue is of a grieving widow with two small children.

There seems to be no exact equivalent form of a pacifist memorial within the United Kingdom but evidently sentiments were in many cases identical. Thus, and although it seems that this has never been generally recognized, it can be argued that there was throughout the United Kingdom a construction of war memorials with reference to the concept of peace (e.g. West Hartlepool War Memorial in what is now known as Hartlepool (previously West Hartlepool) with the inscription 'Thine O Lord is the Victory' relating to amongst other architecture the 1871 Royal Albert Hall of Arts and Sciences with a frieze including the same words and concluding 'Glory be to God on high and on earth peace').

=== World War II and later ===
In many cases, World War I memorials were later extended to show the names of locals who died in the World War II in addition.

Since that time memorials to the dead in other conflicts such as the Korean War and Vietnam War have also noted individual contributions, at least in the West.

In relation to actions which may well in point of fact be historically connected with the world wars even if this happens, for whatever reason, not to be a matter of general discussion (e.g. occupation by Western forces in the 1920s of Palestine and other areas being the homelands of Arabs in the Near East and followed eighty years later in 2001 by the '9/11' raid on New York and elsewhere in the United States) similar historically and architecturally significant memorials are also designed and constructed (such as the National September 11 Memorial).

== Types ==
- War memorials can differ significantly in type and composition. Many war memorials often take the form of a traditional monument or statue, while others consist of entire buildings, often containing a museum, while yet others are simple plaques. War memorials can take a variety of other forms, including, but not limited to, commemorative gardens, stadiums, eternal flames, urban plazas, stained glass windows, gateways, fountains, or pools of water, military equipment, and parks.
- War memorials often serve as a meeting place for commemorative services. As such, they are often found near the centre of town, or contained in a park or plaza to allow easy public access.
- Many war memorials bear plaques listing the names of those that died in battle. Sometimes these lists can be very long. Some war memorials are dedicated to a specific battle, while others are more general in nature and bear inscriptions listing various theatres of war.
- Many war memorials have epitaphs relating to the unit, battle or war they commemorate. For example, an epitaph which adorns numerous memorials in Commonwealth countries is "The Ode" by Laurence Binyon:

They shall grow not old, as we that are left grow old.
Age shall not weary them, nor the years condemn.
At the going down of the sun and in the morning
We will remember them.

- The Memorial Arch at the Royal Military College of Canada, which remembers ex-cadets who died on military service includes lines of Rupert Brooke's poem, "The Dead":

Blow out, you bugles, over the rich Dead.
There are none of these so lonely and poor of old,
But dying has made us rarer gifts than gold.

- In the years following the end of World War I a heated debate occurred in the United States as to whether memorials should be the standard sort that were created after the Civil War or a more progressive sort of "living memorials". These consisted of bridges, parks, libraries, playgrounds, community centers, civic auditoriums and athletic fields. Examples include Soldier Field and Veterans Stadium.
- Underwater memorials commemorate veterans and soldiers who served as divers during their wartime missions.

=== Tank monument ===
A tank monument or armoured memorial is a tank withdrawn from military service and displayed to commemorate a battle or a military unit. Obsolete tanks may also be displayed as gate guards outside military bases.

Immediately following the First World War, a number of obsolete tanks were presented to towns and cities throughout Britain for display and for use as memorials: most were scrapped in the 1920s and 1930s, but one that survives is a Mark IV Female tank at Ashford, Kent.

Several Second World War tanks are preserved as memorials to major armoured offensives in the Ardennes, such as the Battle of Sedan and the Battle of the Bulge. These include:

- an Achilles tank destroyer in La Roche
- a Panther tank in the village Celles
- a Sherman tank in the town square of Bastogne
- a Tiger II tank in the village of La Gleize

A plinth-mounted T-35/85 tank commemorates the soldiers of the 5th Guards Tank Army, at Znamianka in Ukraine.

== In cemeteries ==
Many cemeteries tended by the Commonwealth War Graves Commission have an identical war memorial called the Cross of Sacrifice designed by Sir Reginald Blomfield that varies in height from 18 to 32 feet (5.5 to 9.8 m) depending on the size of the cemetery. If there are one thousand or more burials, a Commonwealth cemetery will contain a Stone of Remembrance, designed by Sir Edwin Lutyens with words from the Wisdom of Sirach: "Their name liveth for evermore"; all the Stones of Remembrance are 11 feet 6 inches (3.5 m) long and 5 feet (1.5 m) high with three steps leading up to them.

Arlington National Cemetery has a Canadian Cross of Sacrifice with the names of all the citizens of the United States who lost their lives fighting in the Canadian forces during the Korean War and two World Wars.

== Controversy ==
War memorials can sometimes be politically controversial. A notable case is that of the Yasukuni Shrine in Japan, where a number of convicted World War II war criminals are interred. Chinese and Korean representatives have often protested against the visits of Japanese politicians to the shrine. The visits have in the past led to severe diplomatic conflicts between the nations, and Japanese businesses were attacked in China after a visit by former Japanese Prime Minister Junichiro Koizumi to the shrine was widely reported and criticized in Chinese and Korean media.

In a similar case, former German chancellor Helmut Kohl was criticised by writers Günter Grass and Elie Wiesel for visiting the war cemetery at Bitburg (in the company of Ronald Reagan) which also contained the bodies of SS troops. Unlike the case of the Yasukuni Shrine, there was no element of intentional disregard of international opinion involved, as is often claimed for the politician visits to the Japanese shrine.

Soviet World War II memorials included quotes of Joseph Stalin's texts, frequently replaced after his death. Such memorials were often constructed in city centres and now are sometimes regarded as symbols of Soviet occupation and removed, which in turn may spark protests (see Bronze Soldier of Tallinn).

The Fusiliers' memorial arch to the Royal Dublin Fusiliers who fought in the Boer War, erected at 1907 in St. Stephen's Green, Dublin, was called "Traitors' Gate" by the Redmondites and later Irish Republicans, from whose point of view Irish soldiers going off to fight the British Empire's wars were traitors to Ireland. The sharpness of the controversy gradually faded, and while the term "Traitors' Gate" is still in occasional colloquial use in Dublin daily life, it has mostly lost its pejorative meaning.

In Australia, in 1981, historian Henry Reynolds raised the issue of whether war memorials should be erected to Indigenous Australians who had died fighting against British invaders on their lands.

How, then, do we deal with the Aboriginal dead? White Australians frequently say that 'all that' should be forgotten. But it will not be. It cannot be. Black memories are too deeply, too recently scarred. And forgetfulness is a strange prescription coming from a community which has revered the fallen warrior and emblazoned the phrase 'Lest We Forget' on monuments throughout the land. [...] [D]o we make room for the Aboriginal dead on our memorials, cenotaphs, boards of honour and even in the pantheon of national heroes? If we are to continue to celebrate the sacrifice of men and women who died for their country can we deny admission to fallen tribesmen? There is much in their story that Australians have traditionally admired. They were ever the underdogs, were always outgunned, yet frequently faced death without flinching. If they did not die for Australia as such they fell defending their homelands, their sacred sites, their way of life. What is more the blacks bled on their own soil and not half a world away furthering the strategic objectives of a distant Motherland whose influence must increasingly be seen as of transient importance in the history of the continent.

Reynolds' suggestion proved controversial. Occasional memorials have been erected to commemorate Aboriginal people's resistance to colonisation, or to commemorate white massacres of Indigenous Australians. These memorials have often generated controversy. For example, a 1984 memorial to the Kalkadoon people's "resistance against the paramilitary force of European settlers and the Queensland Native Mounted Police" was "frequently shot at" and "eventually blown up".

With the advent of long war, some memorials are constructed before the conflict is over, leaving space for extra names of the dead. For instance, the Northwood Gratitude and Honor Memorial in Irvine, CA, memorializes an ongoing pair of US wars, and has space to inscribe the names of approximately 8,000 fallen servicemembers, while the UK National Memorial Arboretum near Lichfield in England hosts the UK's National Armed Forces Memorial which displays the names of the more than 16,000 people who have already died on active service in the UK armed forces since World War II, with more space available for future fatalities.

== List of war memorials ==
=== Africa ===
==== Egypt ====
- Unknown Soldier Memorial (Egypt)
- Port Said Martyrs Memorial

==== Somaliland ====
- Hargeisa War Memorial

=== Americas ===
==== Brazil ====
- Monument to the dead of World War II
- Monument to the Expeditionary

==== Canada ====
- List of Canadian war memorials

==== Falkland Islands ====
- 1982 Liberation Memorial

==== United States ====
- The Hiker (Kitson) and The Hiker (Newman)
- Indiana World War Memorial Plaza
- Iron Mike
- Korean War Veterans Memorial
- Liberation (Holocaust memorial)
- Liberty Memorial
- List of memorials to the Grand Army of the Republic
- List of Confederate monuments and memorials
- List of monuments of the Gettysburg Battlefield
- List of Union Civil War monuments and memorials
- Middle East Conflicts Wall Memorial
- National Cemetery
- Navy – Merchant Marine Memorial
- Northwood Gratitude and Honor Memorial
- Prison Ship Martyrs' Monument
- Soldier Field
- Spirit of the American Doughboy
- Spirit of the American Navy
- Tomb of the Unknown Revolutionary War Soldier
- Tomb of the Unknowns
- United States Marine Corps War Memorial
- United States Navy Memorial
- Vietnam Veterans Memorial
- Vietnam Women's Memorial
- World War I Memorial (Kansas City, Missouri)
- World War I Memorial (Washington, D.C.)
- World War II Memorial

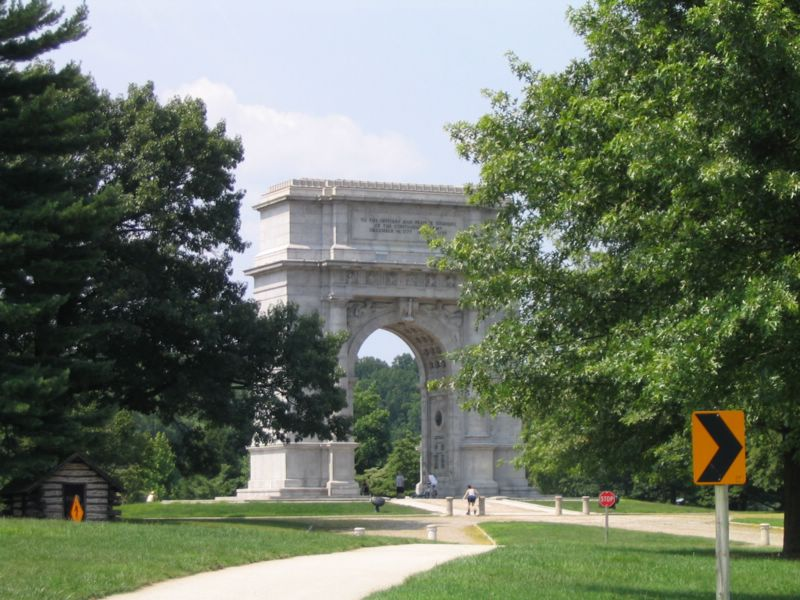
Valley Forge Memorial Arch, Valley Forge, Pennsylvania

===== Memorial coliseums and stadiums in the United States =====
- Memorial Coliseum, Lexington, Kentucky
- Memorial Coliseum, Corpus Christi, Texas
- Veterans Memorial Coliseum, Portland, Oregon
- Allen County War Memorial Coliseum, Fort Wayne, Indiana
- Legion Field, Birmingham, Alabama
- Coleman Coliseum, Tuscaloosa, Alabama
- Beard–Eaves–Memorial Coliseum, Auburn, Alabama
- Los Angeles Memorial Coliseum, Los Angeles, California
- Lawrence Joel Veterans Memorial Coliseum, Winston-Salem, North Carolina
- Jacksonville Veterans Memorial Coliseum, Jacksonville, Florida
- VyStar Veterans Memorial Arena, Jacksonville, Florida
- Arizona Veterans Memorial Coliseum, Phoenix, Arizona
- Soldiers and Sailors Memorial Coliseum, Evansville, Indiana
- Nassau Veterans Memorial Coliseum, Uniondale, New York
- New Haven Veterans Memorial Coliseum, New Haven, Connecticut
- Veterans Memorial Coliseum, Marion, Ohio
- Veterans Stadium, Philadelphia, Pennsylvania
- War Memorial Stadium (Buffalo, New York)
- War Memorial Stadium (Arkansas), Little Rock, Arkansas

=== Asia ===
==== Bangladesh ====
- Jatiyo Smriti Soudho, Savar, in Bangladesh
- Mainamati War Cemetery, Comilla in Bangladesh (WWII)
- Chittagong War Cemetery, Chattogram in Bangladesh (WWII)

==== China ====
- Monument to the People's Heroes (Beijing)

===== Hong Kong =====
- The Cenotaph (Hong Kong)

==== India ====
- Amar Jawan Jyoti (to commemorate the dead and unknown soldiers of the Indian Armed Forces who sacrificed their lives defending India)
- India Gate (Dedicated to the soldiers of the British Indian army)
- Khalanga War Memorial, Dehradun
- National War Memorial, New Delhi (National War Memorial (NWM) at India Gate built on the sprawling lawns of India Gate, in memory of the war heroes of Indian forces)
- War Memorial, Darjeeling

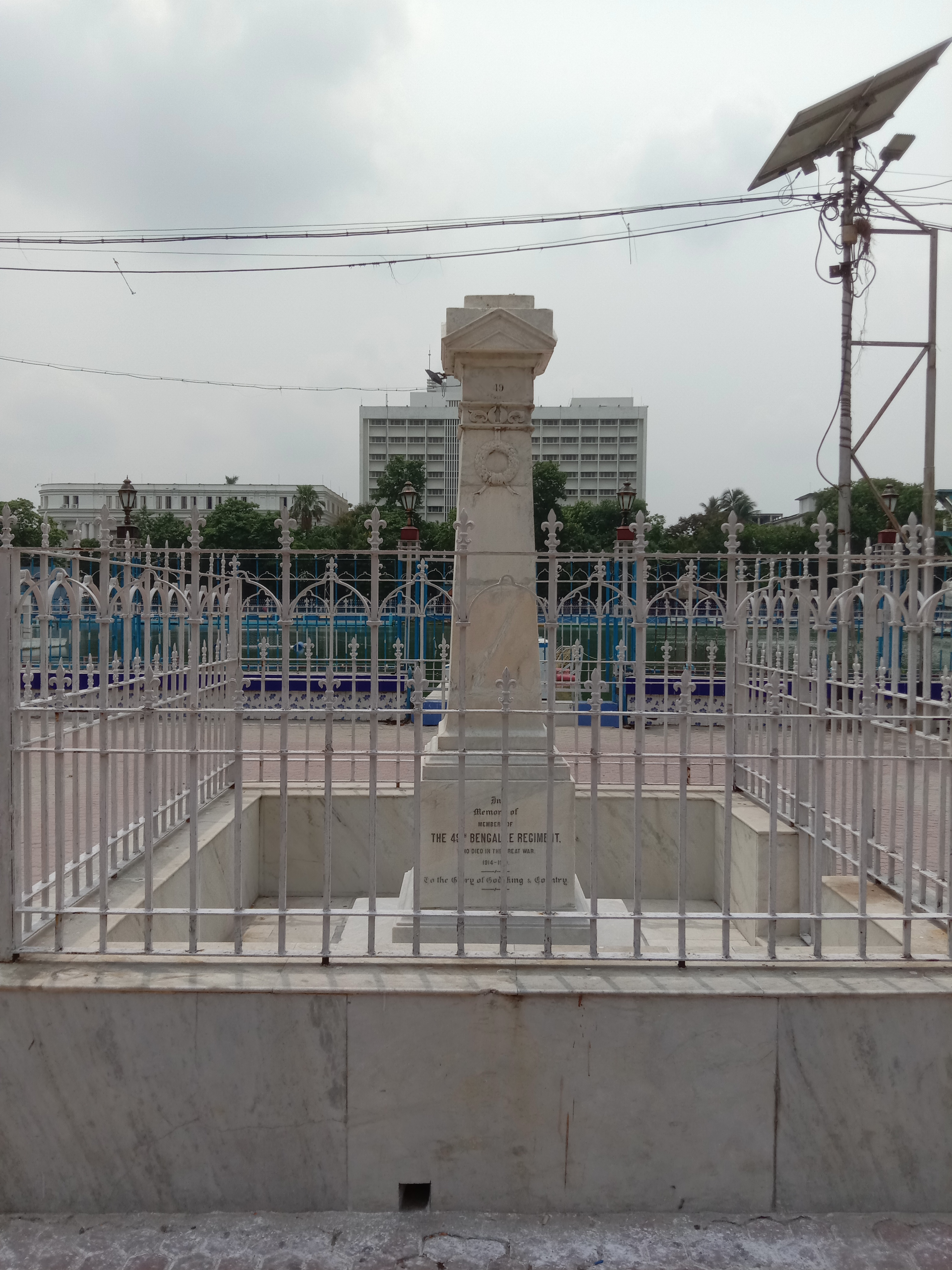
War memorial of the 49th Bengalee Regiment (Bangali Platoon) at College St., Kolkata.

- War Memorial, Kapurthala
- War Memorial of the 49th Bengalee Regiment, Kolkata (dedicated to the soldiers of 49th Bengali Regiment, who died in World War I)
- Victory War Memorial, formerly called the Cupid's bow, is a memorial in Chennai, India, erected in the memory of those from the Madras presidency who died in the world wars.

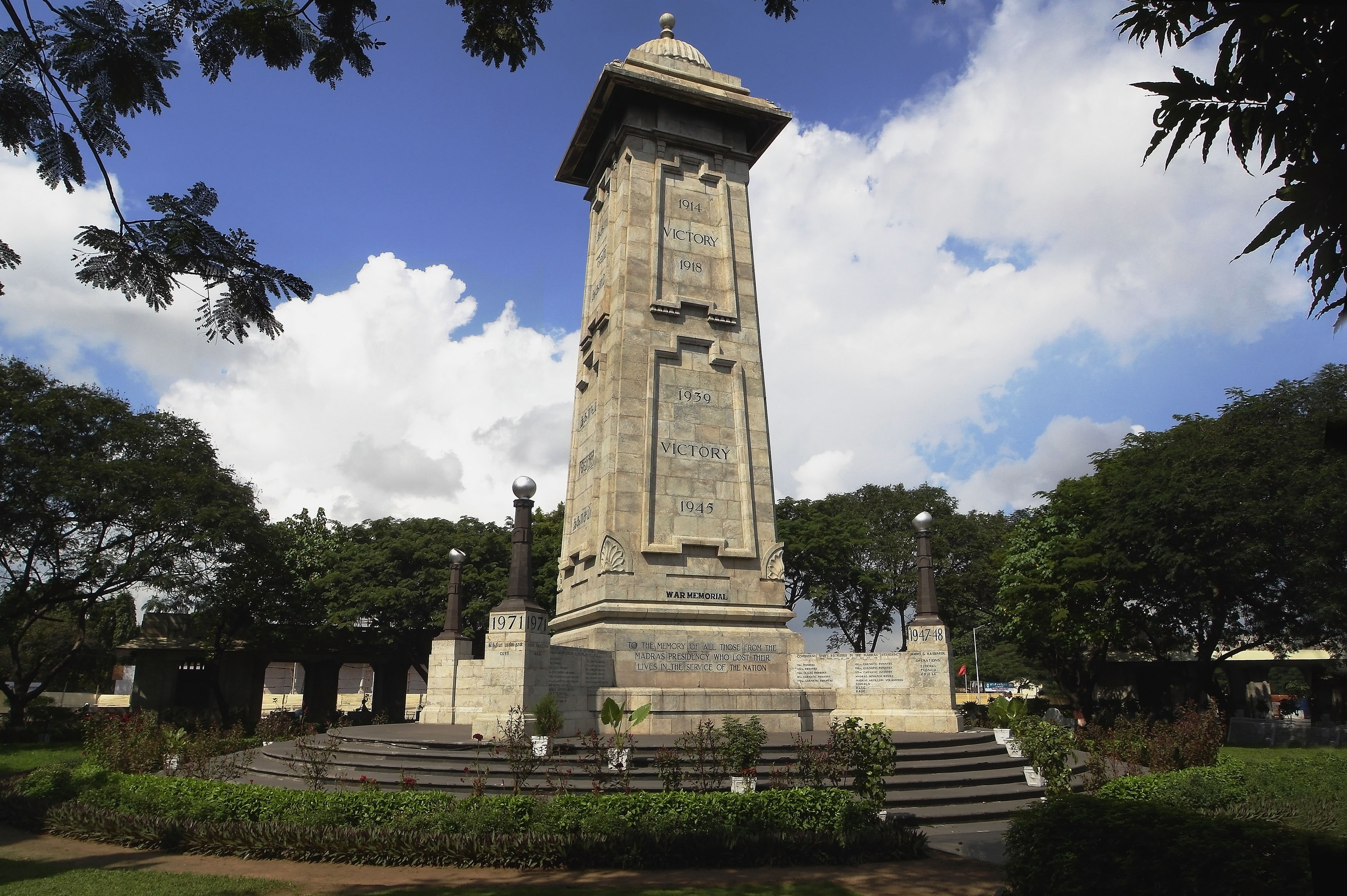
The Victory War Memorial, Chennai, India

==== Iraq ====
- Al-Shaheed Monument

==== Israel ====
- National Memorial Hall (Mount Herzl) (site of Israel's national cemetery and other memorial facilities)
- Yad Vashem (located on the Mount of Remembrance in Jerusalem, dedicated to gentiles who, at personal risk and without a financial or evangelistic motive, chose to save Jews from genocide)
- Garden of the Righteous Among the Nations (dedicated to honor those gentiles who during the Holocaust of World War 2 risked their lives to save Jews)
- Yom Hazikaron ( lit. "The Day of Remembrance" dedicated for the Fallen Soldiers of Israel and Victims of Terrorism)
- Victims of Acts of Terror Memorial
- Israeli casualties of war memorials:
  - Davidka memorial
  - Memorial for the Defenders of the Old City of Jerusalem
  - Beit Lid memorial
  - Ashdod Port memorial
  - Avivim school bus memorial
  - Avshalom Feinberg memorial
  - Hill 69 memorial
  - Jaffa Road bombing memorial
  - Mahal memorial
  - Ma'alot memorial
  - Six-Day War memorial
  - Coastal Road memorial
  - Maxim restaurant massacre memorial
  - Be'erot Izhak memorial
  - Bus suicide bombing memorial in Tel Aviv
  - Haganah memorial
  - Second Lebanon War memorial
  - 1948 Arab–Israeli War
  - Dolphinarium massacre memorial
  - Combat Engineering Corps memorial
  - Druze soldiers memorial in Daliyat Al-Karmel
  - Olei Hagardom memorial
  - Fatality victims of Palestinian rocket attacks memorial
  - Beersheba suicide terror attack memorial
  - Fallen Israeli policemen memorial
  - Memorial for the fallen soldiers of the Israeli Engineering Corp
  - Convoy of the Lamed-Heh memorial
  - Kiryat Anavim military cemetery
  - Independence War Memorial in Kibbutz Malkia
  - Yad La-Shiryon (lit. The Armored Corps Memorial Site and Museum at Latrun)

==== Japan ====
- Yasukuni Shrine
- Chidorigafuchi National Cemetery

==== Lebanon ====
- Mleeta museum

==== Malaysia ====
- Tugu Negara (National Monument)

==== Myanmar ====
- Taukkyan War Cemetery (British Commonwealth "Burma")

==== Nepal ====
- Gurkha Memorial Park, Dharan

==== Pakistan ====
- Yaadgar-e-Shuhada

==== Philippines ====
- Mausoleum of the Veterans of the Revolution

==== Singapore ====
- Kranji Memorial

==== South Korea ====
- The War Memorial Museum
- Gapyeong Canada Monument

==== Thailand ====
- Victory Monument

==== United Arab Emirates ====
- Oasis of Dignity

=== Europe ===
==== Austria ====
- Soviet war memorial (Vienna)

==== Belarus ====
- Brest Fortress (Brest)
- Khatyn massacre

==== Belgium ====
- The Interallied Memorial of Cointe (Liège)
- Menin Gate Memorial (Ypres)
- Saint Julien Memorial (Langemark)
- Island of Ireland Peace Park (Messines)
- Lion's Mound (Waterloo)

==== Croatia ====
- Petrova Gora Monument
- Slabinja Monument

==== Denmark ====
- Jutland Memorial park

==== Estonia ====
- Independence War Victory Column (Tallinn)

==== France ====
- Beaumont-Hamel Newfoundland Memorial Park
- Douaumont Ossuary Verdun
- Welsh Memorial at Mametz Wood
- Notre Dame de Lorette
- Neuve-Chapelle Indian Memorial
- Pozières Memorial (British World War I memorial)
- Verdun Memorial
- Villers–Bretonneux Australian National Memorial (Australian World War I memorial)
- Vimy Ridge Memorial (Canadian World War I memorial)
- Thiepval Memorial to the Missing of the Somme (British World War I memorial)
- Normandy American Cemetery and Memorial (USA World War II memorial)
  - see also Monuments aux Morts

==== Germany ====
- Tannenberg memorial
- Völkerschlachtdenkmal
- Befreiungshalle
- Hermannsdenkmal
- Soviet War Memorial (Treptower Park)
- Neue Wache Berlin
- Prussian National Monument for the Liberation Wars
- Aegidienkirche, Hanover, church ruined in World War II, with a Hiroshima peace bell
- Laboe Naval Memorial
- German Army Memorial
- Luftwaffe Memorial

==== Ireland ====
- Garden of Remembrance "all those who gave their lives in the cause of Irish Freedom" (1798–1921)
- Irish National War Memorial Gardens "to the memory of the 49,400 Irish soldiers who gave their lives in the Great War, 1914–1918"

==== Italy ====
- Redipuglia War Memorial
- Asiago War Memorial
- Sacrario militare di Pocol
- Sacrario militare dei Caduti Oltremare di Bari

==== Latvia ====
- Freedom Monument

==== Malta ====
- Malta Memorial
- War Memorial

==== Netherlands ====
- National Monument (Amsterdam)
- Waalsdorpervlakte
- Erebegraafplaats Bloemendaal
- Netherlands American Cemetery
- Groesbeek Memorial, Canadian War Cemetery
- Liberty Monument Welberg (Welberg (Steenbergen))

==== Poland ====
- Tomb of the Unknown Soldier
- Westerplatte Monument
- Warsaw Uprising Monument
- Mały Powstaniec
- Monument to the Heroes of Warsaw
- Monument to the Ghetto Heroes
- Monument to the Polish Underground State and Home Army
- Monument to the Fallen and Murdered in the East
- Monument to the Battle of Monte Cassino in Warsaw

==== Romania ====
- Mausoleum of Mărăşeşti
- Tomb of the Unknown Soldier
- Arcul de Triumf, Bucharest
- Heroes' Cross on Caraiman Peak
- Mausoleum of Mateiaș, Argeș County

==== Russia ====
- Tomb of the Unknown Soldier (Moscow)
- Piskarevskoye Memorial Cemetery (Siege of Leningrad)
- Poklonnaya Hill (Battle of Moscow)
- Mamayev Kurgan (Battle of Stalingrad)

==== Slovenia ====
- Tomb of National Heroes (Ljubljana)
- Vojko's Plaque
- Monument to the Victims of All Wars
- List of World War II monuments and memorials in Slovenia
- Monuments to the Slovene Partisans

==== Spain ====
- Fossar de les Moreres
- Valle de los Caídos (Valley of the Fallen)

==== Switzerland ====
- Lion Monument

==== Turkey ====
- Monument of Liberty, Istanbul
- Aviation Martyrs' Monument
- Balkan Wars Memorial Cemetery in Edirne
- Çanakkale Martyrs' Memorial
- 57th Infantry Regiment Memorial
- Respect to Mehmetçik Monument
- Atatürk and Şerife Bacı Monument
- Victory Monument (Ankara)
- Cyprus Memorial Forest in Silifke

==== UK ====
- Animals in War Memorial
- The National Armed Forces Memorial in Alrewas, Staffordshire
- The Cenotaph, Whitehall, London
- The Cenotaph, Belfast
- Commando Memorial, Spean Bridge, Highland
- Great Eastern Railway War Memorial, at Liverpool Street station (to the east)
- Great Western Railway War Memorial, at Paddington station (to the west)
- Hall of Memory, Birmingham
- Lewis War Memorial, Stornoway, Western Isles
- London, Brighton and South Coast Railway War Memorial, at London Bridge station (to the south east)
- Battle of Maiwand, Reading
- Midland Railway War Memorial, in Derby
- War memorials in Monmouth, Wales
- National Firefighters Memorial
- North Eastern Railway War Memorial, in York
- Northern Ireland War Memorial
- The Nurses' Chapel, Westminster Abbey, London
- Scottish National War Memorial, Edinburgh Castle, Edinburgh
- Scottish War Memorials
- Shot at Dawn Memorial
- Southampton Cenotaph Lutyens first memorial
- The Unknown Warrior in Westminster Abbey,
- Welsh National War Memorial, Cardiff
- Women of World War II, London
- Women of Steel, Sheffield

=== Oceania ===
==== Australia ====
- ANZAC War Memorial (Sydney)
- Australian War Memorial (Canberra)
- Fremantle War Memorial (Fremantle)
- Great Ocean Road (Victoria)
- Hobart Cenotaph (Hobart)
- State War Memorial (Perth)
- National War Memorial (Adelaide)
- Shrine of Remembrance (Brisbane), and World War I memorials in Queensland
- Shrine of Remembrance (Melbourne)
- Mount Macedon Memorial Cross (Mount Macedon)

==== New Zealand ====
- Auckland War Memorial Museum
- National War Memorial (Wellington)

== See also ==
- Alexander Carrick (Scottish sculptor responsible for several Scottish war memorials)
- Avenue of Honour
- Battlefield Cross (To honor an individual soldier)
- Commemorative plaque
- List of standalone war memorials to the enemy
- Mausolea
- Peace movement
- Removal of Confederate monuments and memorials
- Tomb of the Unknown Soldier (memorials specifically dedicated to unknown soldiers)
- Tropaeum Traiani, in Romania
- UK National Inventory of War Memorials (online database listing all war memorials in the UK)
- War Memorials Trust (UK charity that gives free advice about and grants towards war memorial conservation)
- War Memorial Stadium (for list of stadiums so named in the United States)
