= German Army Memorial =

War memorial in Germany

- Ehrenmal des Deutschen Heeres
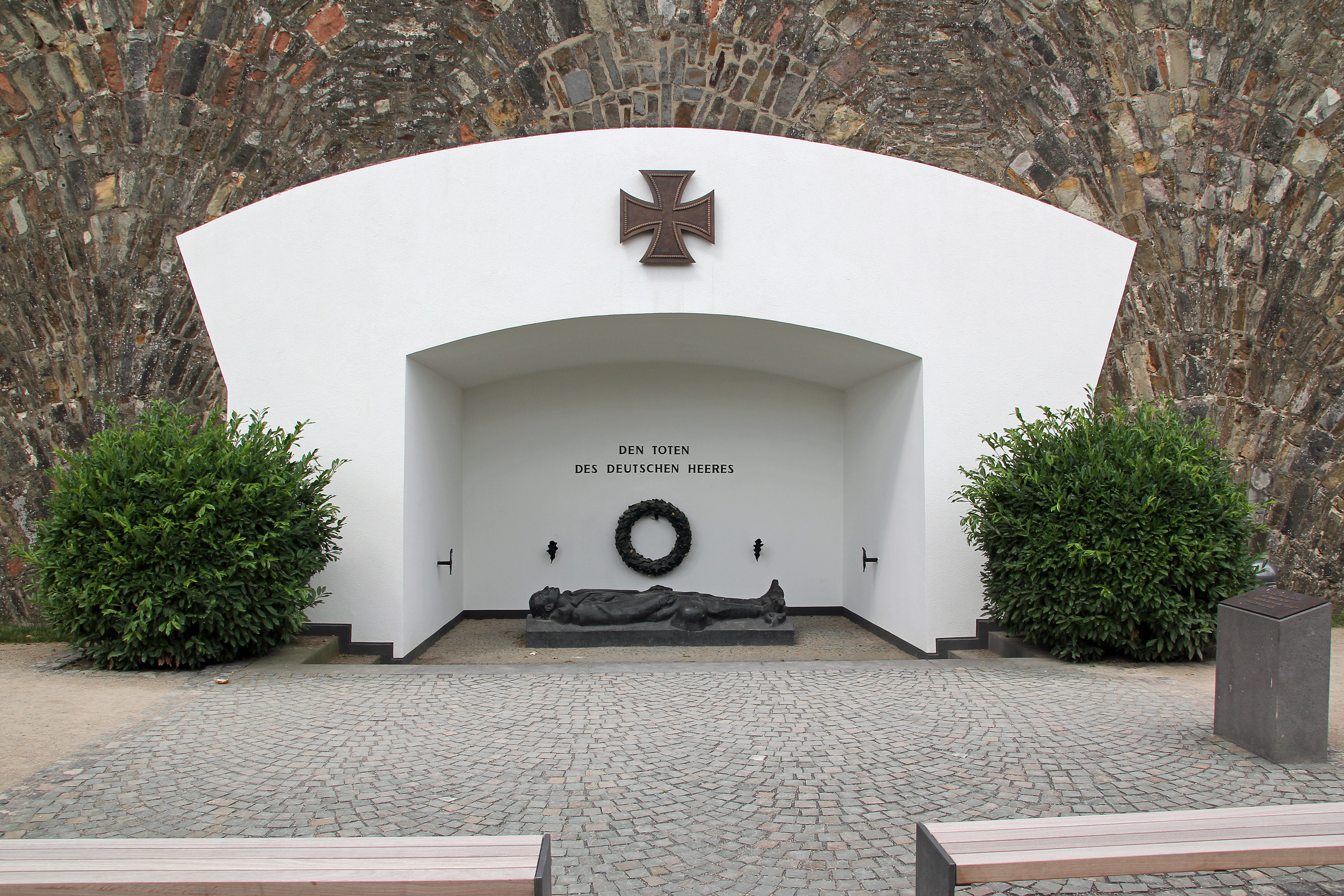
- The German Army Memorial at the Ehrenbreitstein Fortress in Koblenz
- Interactive map of German Army Memorial
- Location: Ehrenbreitstein Fortress in Koblenz, Germany
- Coordinates: 50.365°N 7.615°E
- Designer: Hans Wimmer
- Completion date: 1972
- Dedicated to: Dead of the German Army in the world wars, Bundeswehr soldiers who died in peacetime or in operations abroad

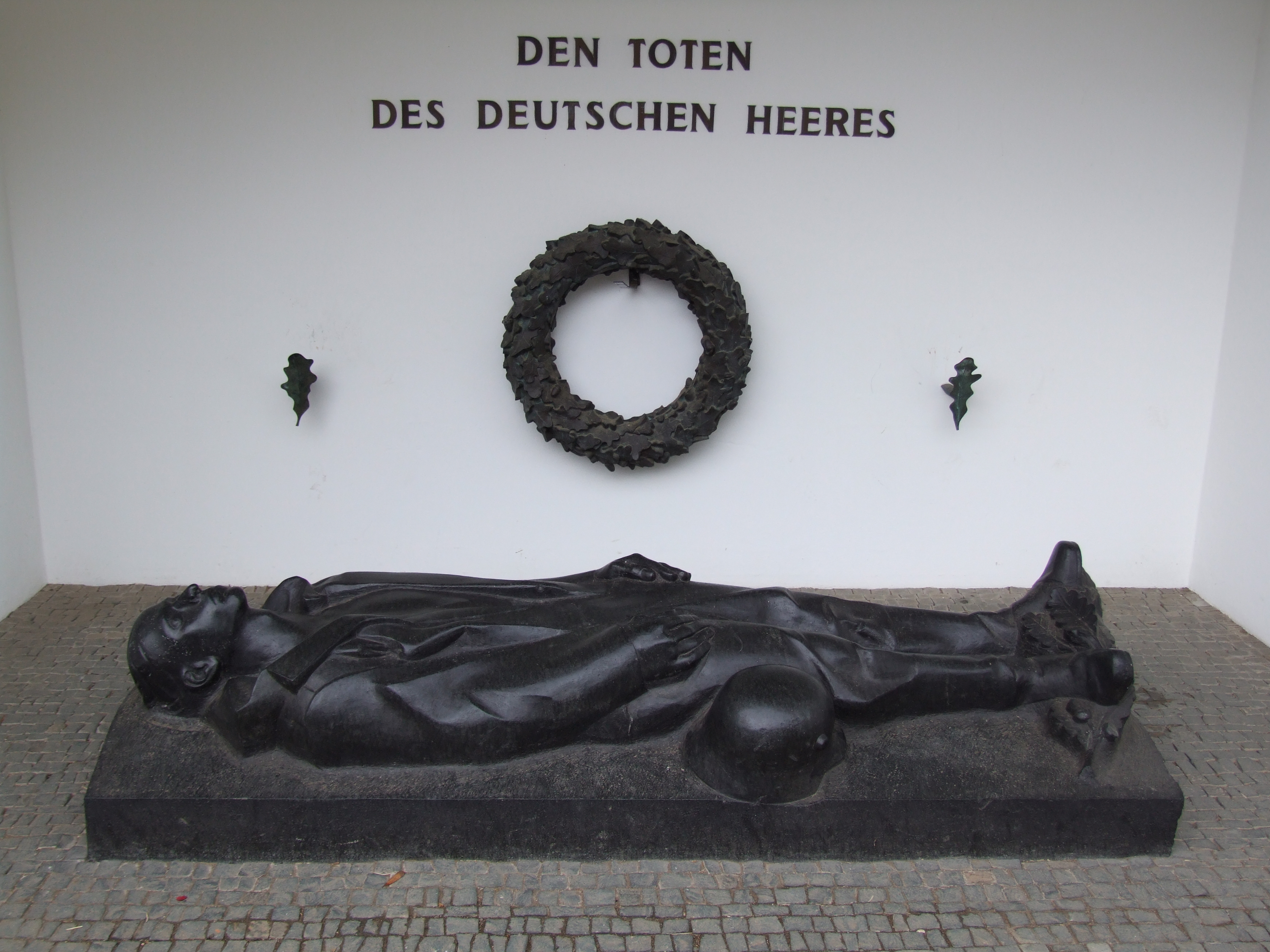
Soldier's statue inside the memorial

The German Army Memorial (German: Ehrenmal des Deutschen Heeres) at the Ehrenbreitstein Fortress in Koblenz is a war memorial inaugurated in 1972 on behalf of the modern German Army in honor of German Army soldiers who died in the two world wars. Since 2006 it also serves to honor soldiers of the Bundeswehr who have died in peacetime or in operations abroad. It is one of three Memorials of the Armed Forces (Ehrenmale der Teilstreitkräfte) for each branch of the Bundeswehr, the others being the Laboe Naval Memorial near Kiel and the Luftwaffe Memorial in Fürstenfeldbruck.

The Inspector of the German Army is the memorial's patron while the board of trustees is responsible for the maintenance of the memorial and the state government of Rhineland-Palatinate owns the memorial and the Ehrenbreitstein Fortress. Since 2002 it has been a part of the UNESCO Upper Middle Rhine Valley Cultural Landscape.

== History ==
After the division of Berlin in the aftermath of the Second World War the newly formed West German Army lost access to the Neue Wache, which had been used since 1931 as the central German military memorial. In 1969 a board of trustees for a future memorial was founded by members of the West German Army and in 1971 the Ehrenbreitstein Fortress in Koblenz was designated as the location for the army's future memorial. Ehrenbreitstein was chosen for many reasons such as the new III Corps being based in the city and its proximity to the Army's command staff in Bonn. Koblenz also had an association with many German military leaders such as August von Gneisenau, Carl von Clausewitz, Albrecht von Roon, Helmuth von Moltke and Paul von Hindenburg who had all worked in the city. The fortress itself also had a long tradition as a garrison for many army units dating back centuries.

The memorial was designed by sculptor Hans Wimmer to be simple but to invite thought and to remind subsequent generations of the suffering of their predecessors. Completed in 1972 the memorial was handed over to the German Army in a ceremony attended by Minister of Defense Georg Leber and Admiral Armin Zimmermann then the Inspector General of the Bundeswehr.

Since its inauguration a memorial service has been held ever year at the site on Volkstrauertag usually attended by an army honor guard, high ranking Bundeswehr officers and German government officials. For the 50th anniversary in 2022 a larger event was held which also included an international military presence with many NATO countries sending military representatives.

As the Bundeswehr become increasingly more involved in overseas missions an extension of the memorial was considered in 2005 to also honor Bundeswehr soldiers killed in operations abroad. In 2006 a stele was erected near the main monument commemorating Bundeswehr soldiers who died in the line of duty.

== Gallery ==
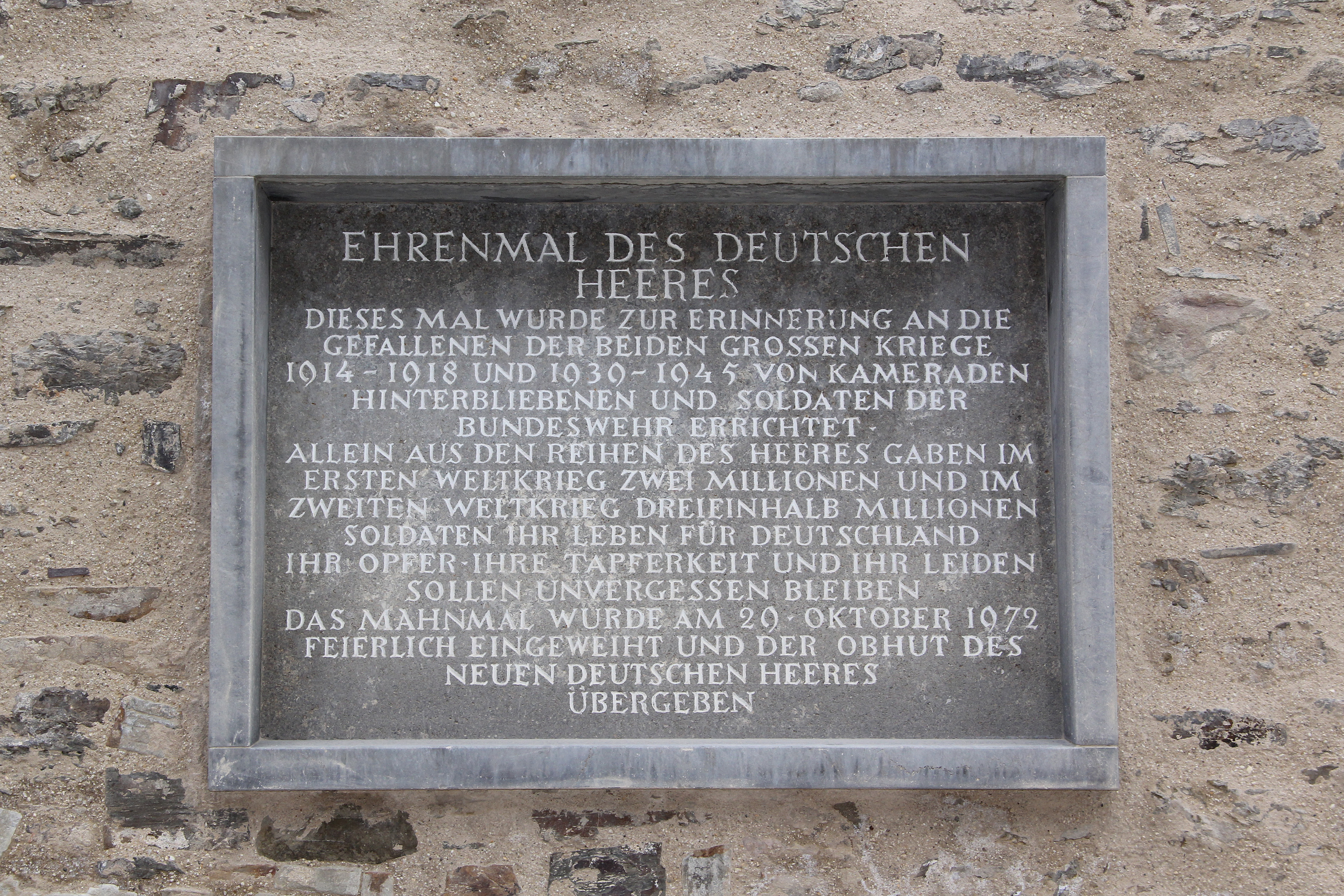
Memorial plaque erected in 1972

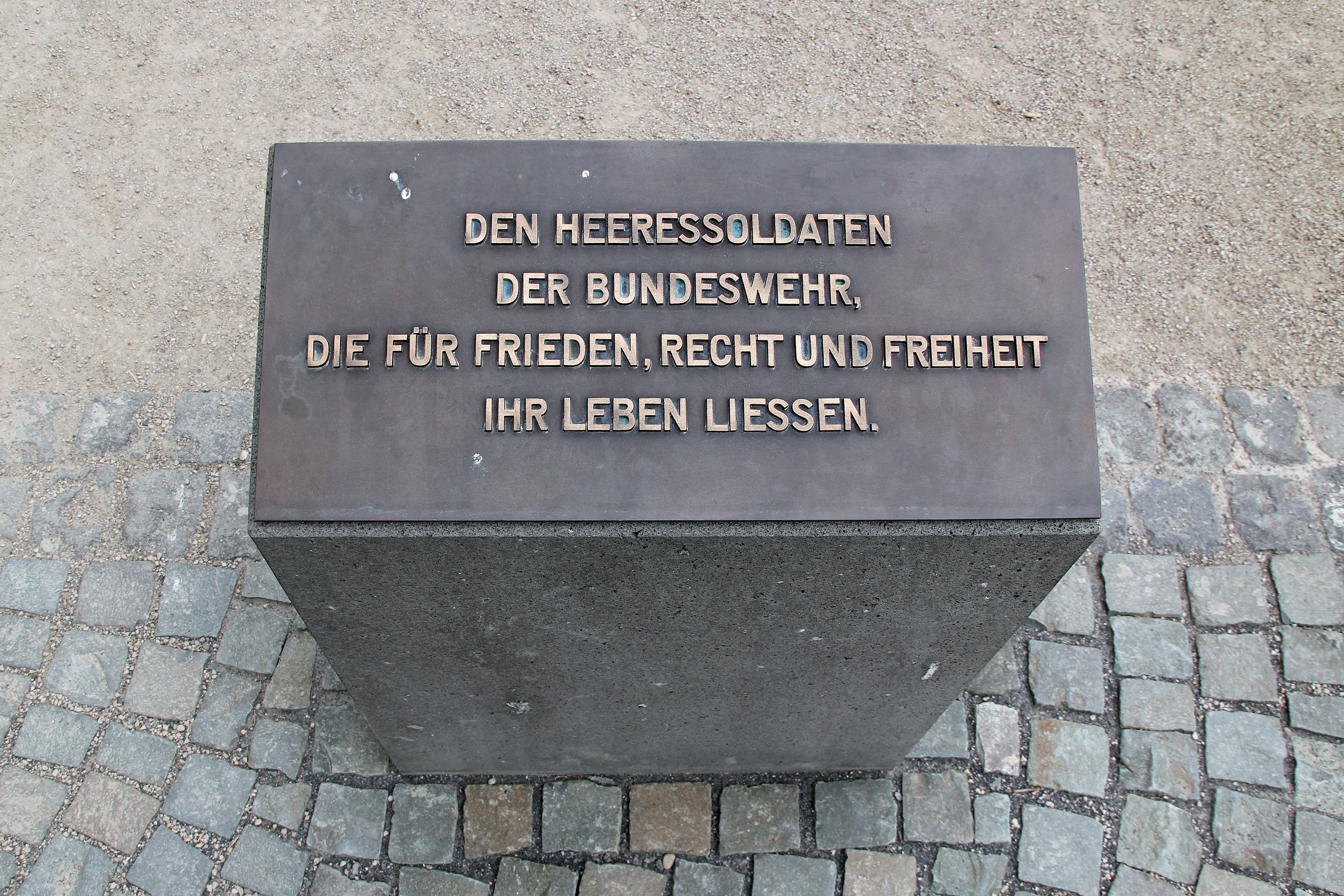
Bundeswehr stele erected in 2006

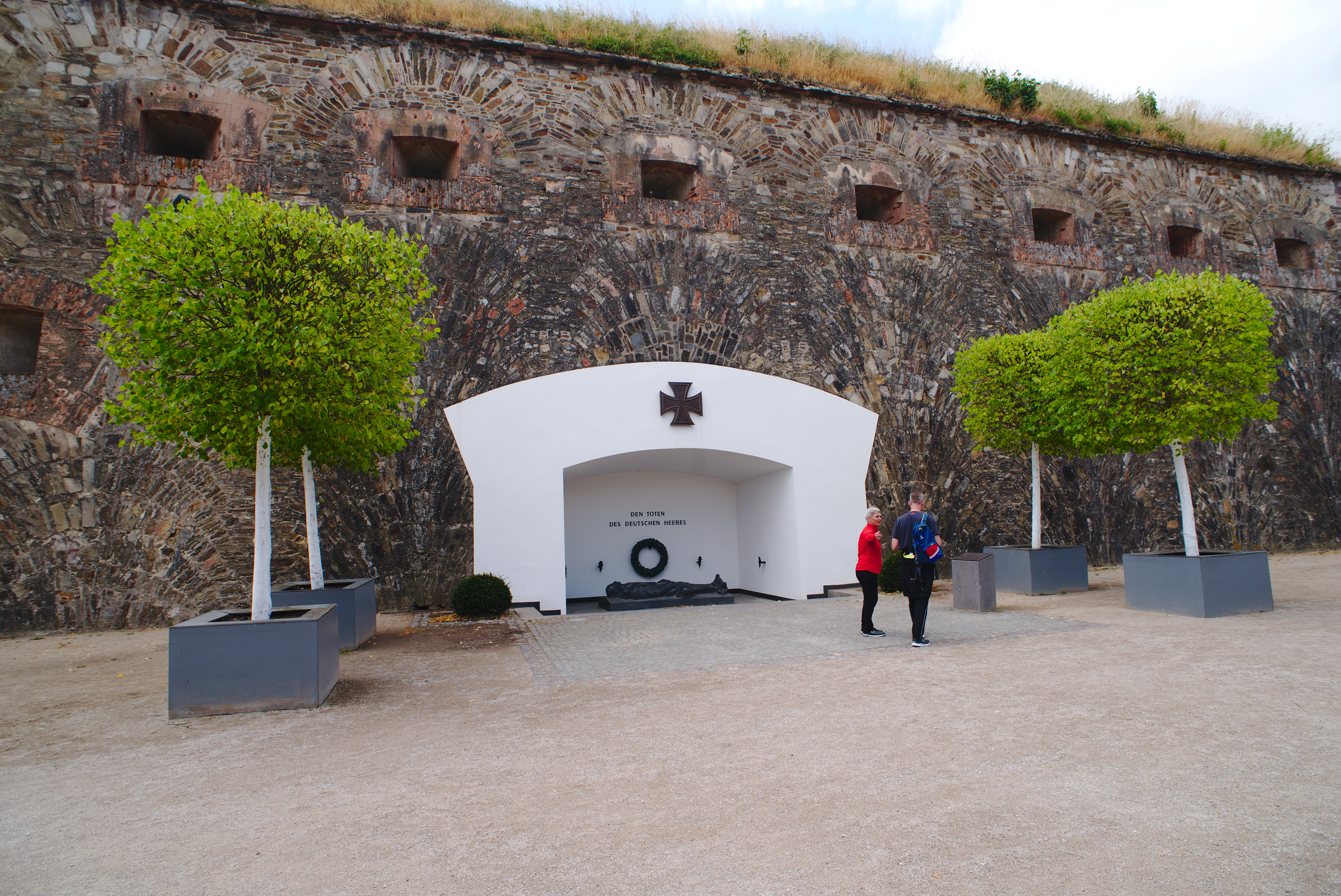
Surroundings of the memorial

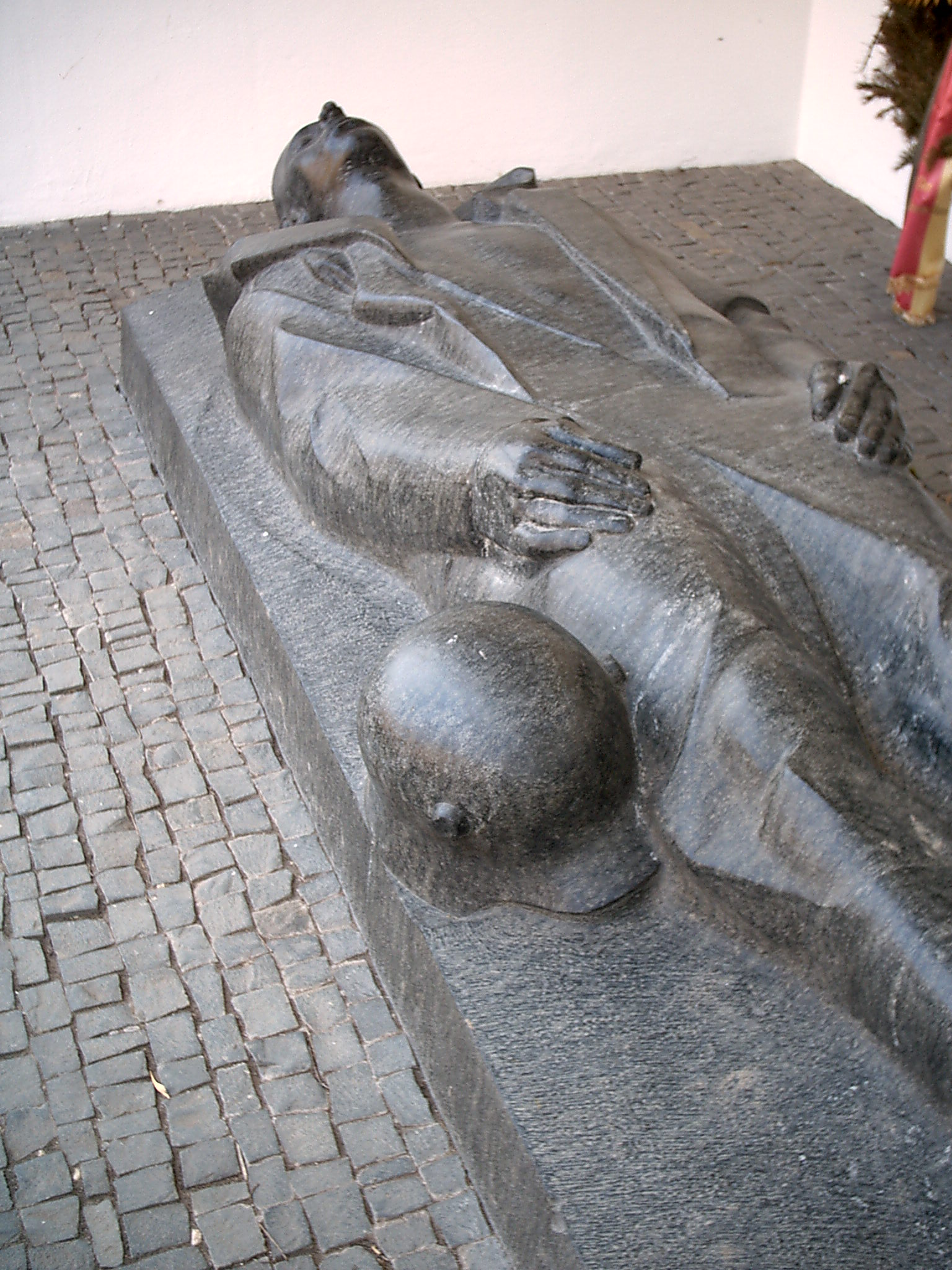
Soldier's statue
