= Luftwaffe Memorial =

War memorial in Germany

- Ehrenmal der Luftwaffe
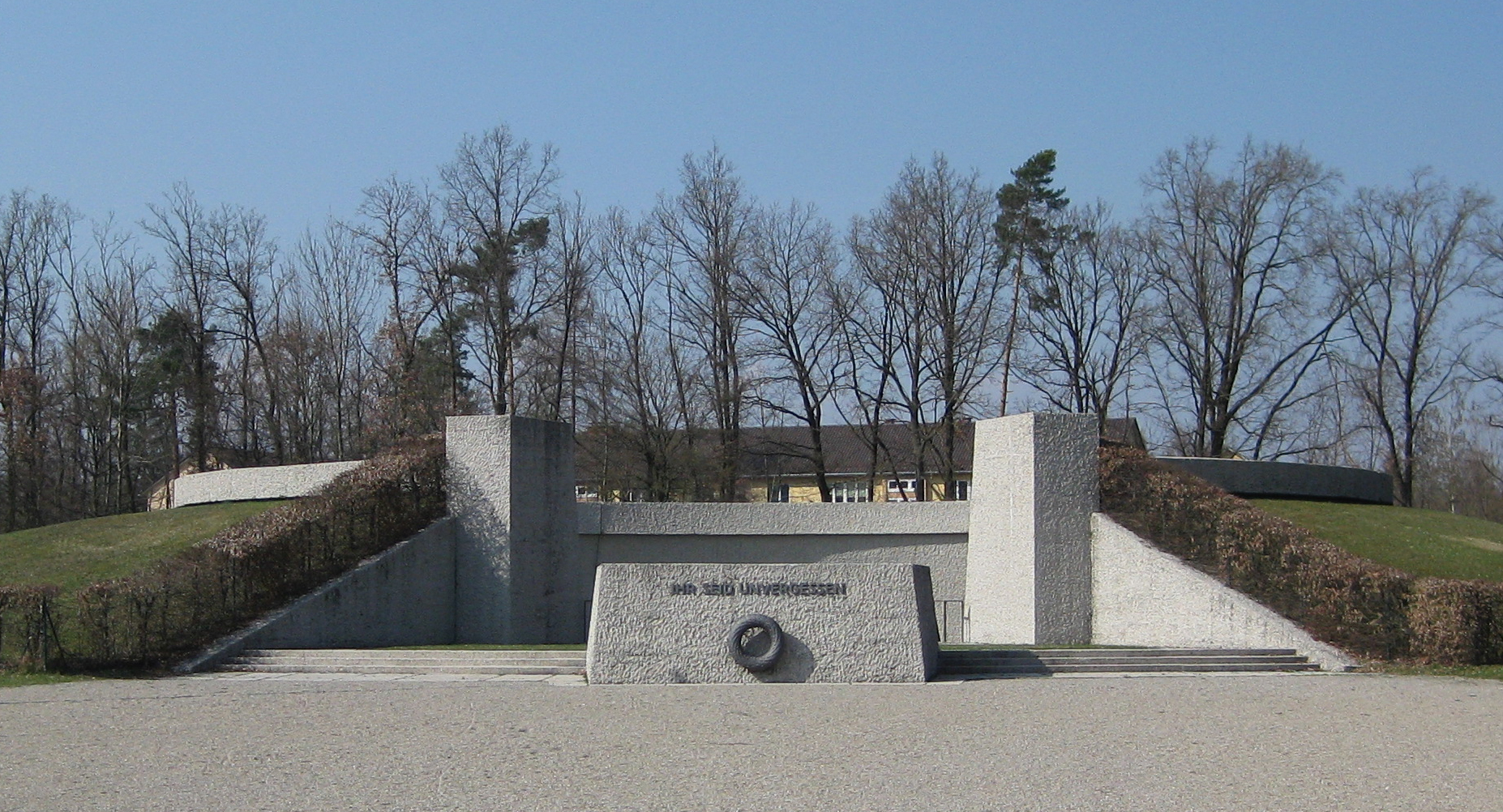
- Front of the memorial
- Interactive map of Luftwaffe Memorial
- Location: Near the Fürstenfeldbruck Air Base, Germany
- Coordinates: 48.1917°N 11.2605°E
- Designer: Ernst Zinsser
- Beginning date: 1957
- Completion date: 1962
- Dedicated to: Dead of the German air forces who fell both in war and peacetime.

The Air Force and Aviation Memorial (German: Ehrenmal der Luftwaffe und der Luftfahrt) also known as the Luftwaffe Memorial (German: Ehrenmal der Luftwaffe) is the central memorial for the modern German Air Force. Built between 1957 and 1962 with donations from then current and former members of the German air forces and other private individuals, it is dedicated to the dead of the German air forces who fell both in war and peacetime.

It is one of three Memorials of the Armed Forces (Ehrenmale der Teilstreitkräfte) for each branch of the Bundeswehr, the others being the Laboe Naval Memorial near Kiel and the German Army Memorial at the Ehrenbreitstein Fortress in Koblenz.

== History ==
In 1957 former and then current members of the German Air Force formed the Stiftung Luftwaffen-Ehrenmal (Air Force Memorial Foundation) with the goal of creating a new central memorial for the nascent West German Air Force. The town of Fürstenfeldbruck was chosen as the site due to it being seen as the "cradle of the Luftwaffe" as the first West German combat aircraft were handed over to the newly formed Luftwaffe only a year prior in 1956.

In 1960 a design by Architect Ernst Zinsser was chosen and the ceremonial laying of the foundation stone was done on 24 September 1961. The memorial was then inaugurated the next year on 18 November 1962 in a ceremony attended by then Inspector of the Air Force Generalleutnant Werner Panitzki and with speeches given by retired General Josef Kammhuber, who had served as the first Inspector of the Air Force, and Cardinal Julius August Döpfner who was the Archbishop of Munich and Freising.

Since 1977 there has been an annual ceremony held on Volkstrauertag at the memorial that honors the dead of both worlds wars, victims of aviation accidents and the dead of the current German Air Force. After the closure of the nearby Fürstenfeldbruck Air Base in 2011 an agreement was struck with the town for the permanent preservation of the memorial as a historical site. In 2021 Inspector of the Air Force General Ingo Gerhartz announced his intention to build a new memorial near Roth, Bavaria where the Air Force's Officer School is being relocated to from its present location in Fürstenfeldbruck near the current memorial.

In 2024 the memorial was also officially added to the Bavarian monuments list as an important architectural monument by the Bavarian State Office for Monument Protection. This was after an initiative by local city councilors concerned that with the closure of the Fürstenfeldbruck Air Base and the departure of a large air force presence from the town that local authorities would struggle with the considerable upkeep cost without state or federal government support.

== Gallery ==
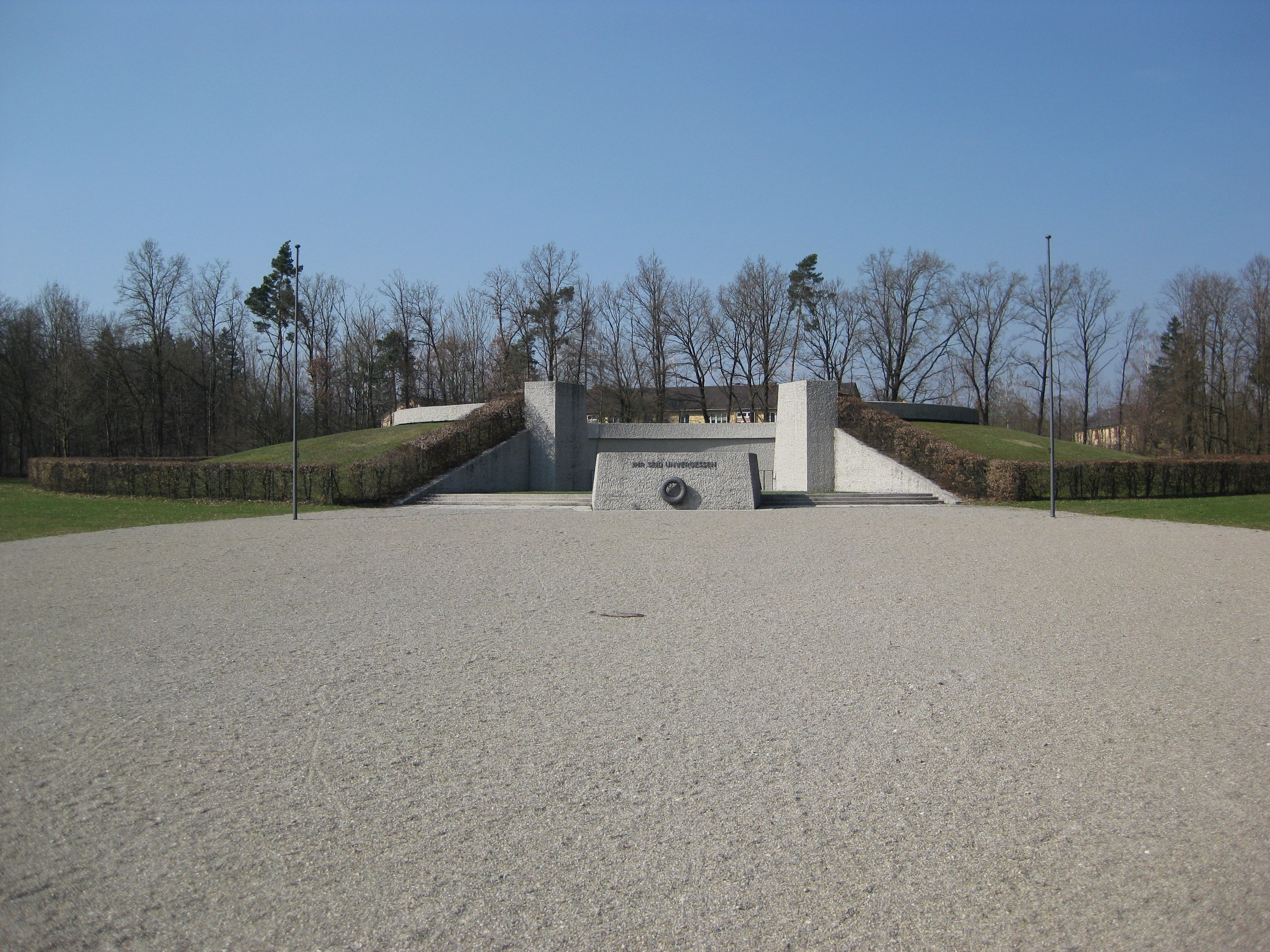
Front of the memorial

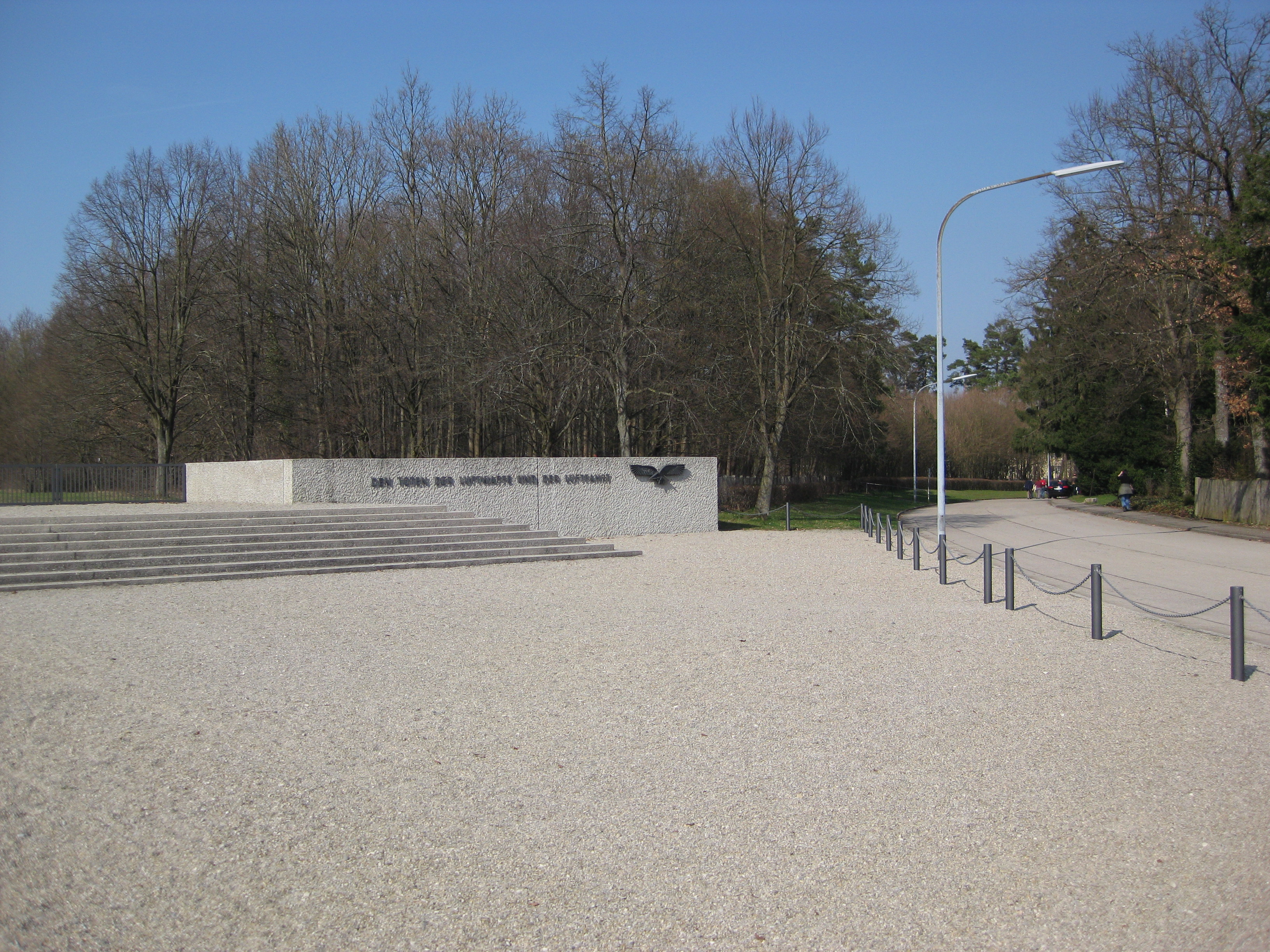
Entrance area

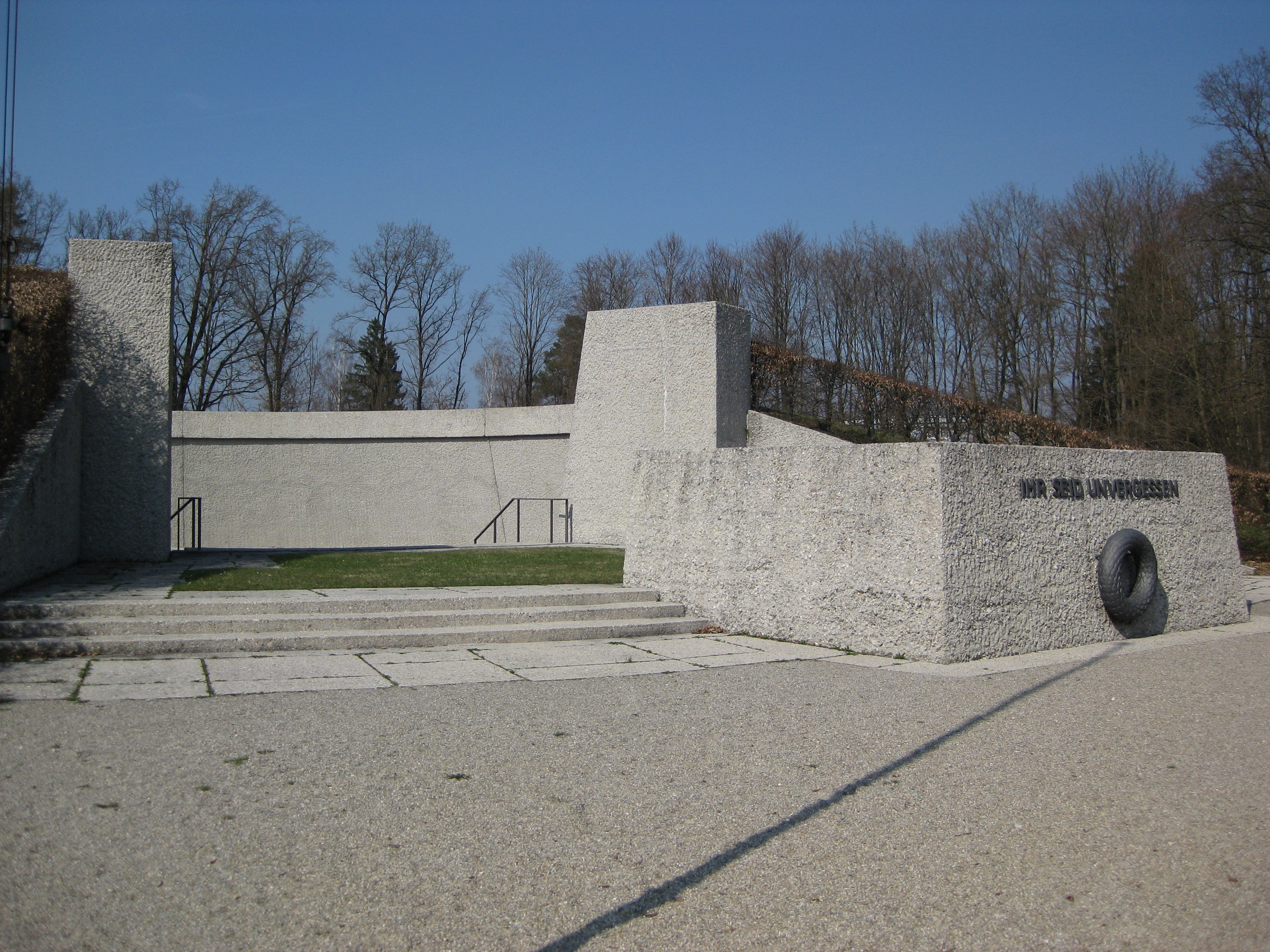
Surroundings of the memorial

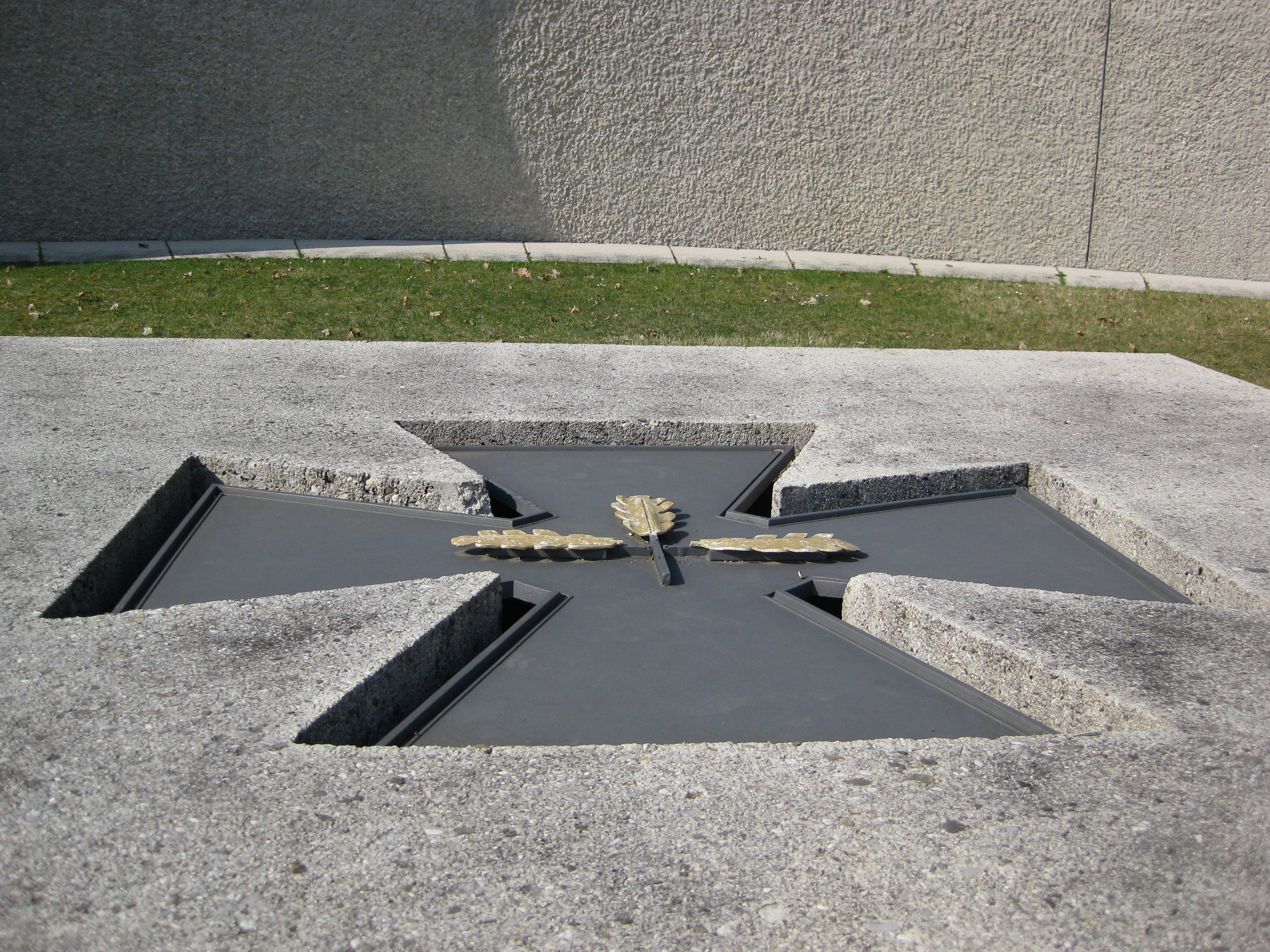
Central iron cross
