= Hans Wimmer =

German sculptor (1907–1992)

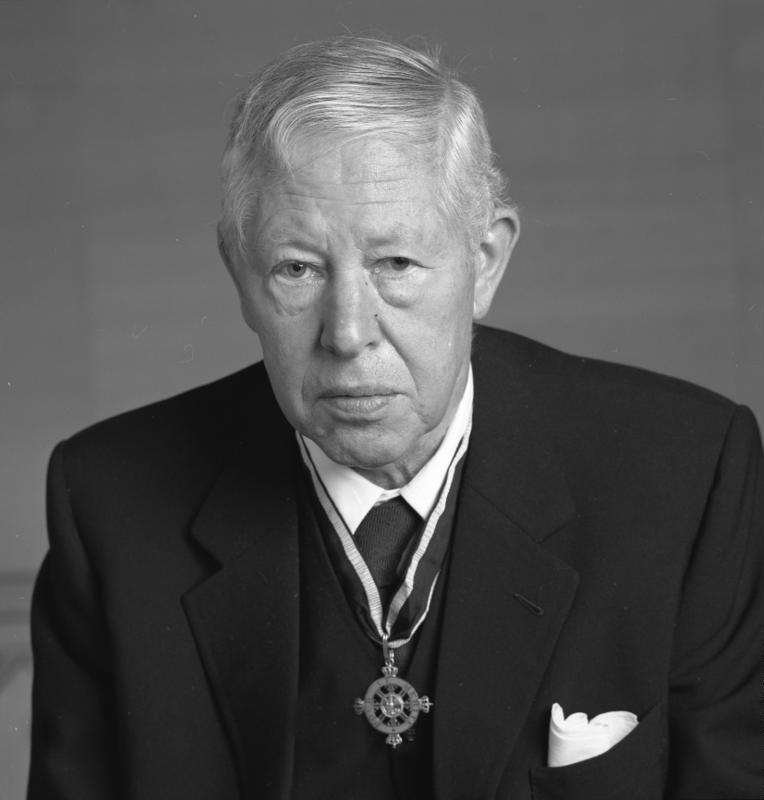
Wimmer in 1983

Hans Wimmer (born 19 March 1907 in Pfarrkirchen; died 31 August 1992 in Munich) was a German sculptor.
