= Greenfield, Flintshire =

Village in Flintshire, Wales

Coordinates: 53.289°N 3.210°W

Greenfield: Welsh: Maes-glas
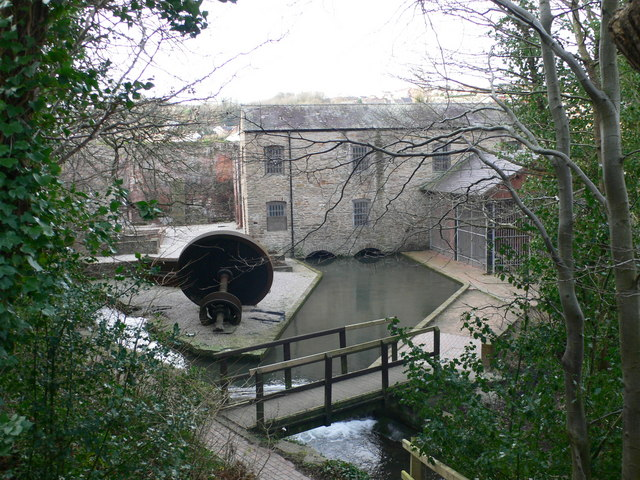
- Old cotton mill, Greenfield

- Location within Flintshire
- Population: 2,741 (2011 census)
- OS grid reference: SJ185755
- Principal area: Flintshire
- Preserved county: Clwyd
- Country: Wales
- Sovereign state: United Kingdom
- Post town: HOLYWELL
- Postcode district: CH8
- Dialling code: 01352
- Police: North Wales
- Fire: North Wales
- Ambulance: Welsh
- UK Parliament: Clwyd East
- Senedd Cymru – Welsh Parliament: Delyn

Greenfield (Welsh: Maes-glas) is a village in the community of Holywell, Flintshire, north-east Wales, on the edge of the River Dee estuary. At the time of the 2001 census it had a population of 2,741, which remained unchanged in the 2011 census.

The Welsh language name of the village, Maes-glas or Maesglas, has the same meaning as "Greenfield". The name Maesglas was recorded in 1579, with the English version recorded as "Fulbroke al[ias] Greneffelde" as early as 1540.

== History ==
Greenfield is best known for its history of papermaking. A paper mill has been on this site since 1770. The site was chosen due to the constant water flow from the stream which comes from the St Winefride's Well. The speed this site developed was one of the reasons that Greenfield is still linked with the start of the Industrial Revolution. In the mid 19th century up to 80 businesses had set up in the mile stretch between Holywell and Greenfield The remains of some can now be seen as conservation and industrial archeological projects have been undertaken in recent years. Among the businesses were a copper mill, a flannel mill, a flour mill, shirt-makers and soft drink works, W Hall & Son (which still exists today). Greenfield was also home to two Courtaulds rayon factories and a sulphuric acid plant from 1936 to 1985.

In 1842 William Crockford, of London gambling club fame, built the Zinc Smelting Works on the northern side of the coast road adjacent to the gas works. The factory was said at the time to be the most modern in Britain with its own dedicated railway to the nearby Crockford Wharf. Crockford died in 1844 and his widow Sarah continued running the factory with the assistance of a daughter and two sons - Fanny, Henry and Charles Crockford, the latter of whom patented several zinc smelting inventions. The family also laid a mineral railway from Pantasaph to the factory, converted Parys Mine works into a limestone crushing plant and ran a cement factory at Bryn Celyn. With industrial changes and periodic managerial problems output from the zinc works ceased by the turn of the century and derelict buildings were largely removed by 1928.

Greenfield's oldest building is Basingwerk Abbey, founded circa 1132 by Ranulph de Gernon, 2nd Earl of Chester. It was an important monastic centre in north Wales; both Llywelyn ap Iorwerth and Dafydd ap Llywelyn were patrons. In 1536, abbey life came to an end with the Dissolution of the Monasteries. In ruins since the time of Oliver Cromwell, it is in the care of Cadw (Welsh Heritage). The ruins are now part of Greenfield Valley Heritage Park, with the adjacent grounds home to an agricultural museum. Many of the museum's buildings were moved stone by stone from the surrounding area, including an old school house.

A hidden Gatso speed camera, on the A548 road leading to Bagillt, near the old disused railway bridge, was voted the worst-placed speed camera in the UK by the Association of British Drivers, despite the fact that until 2009 Arrive Alive conducted their Speed Awareness courses at the Greenfield Business Centre, based in the original paper mill building 200 yards away.

=== Holywell Junction Railway Station ===
The North Wales Coast Line runs through Holywell Junction with trains running fast through the station.

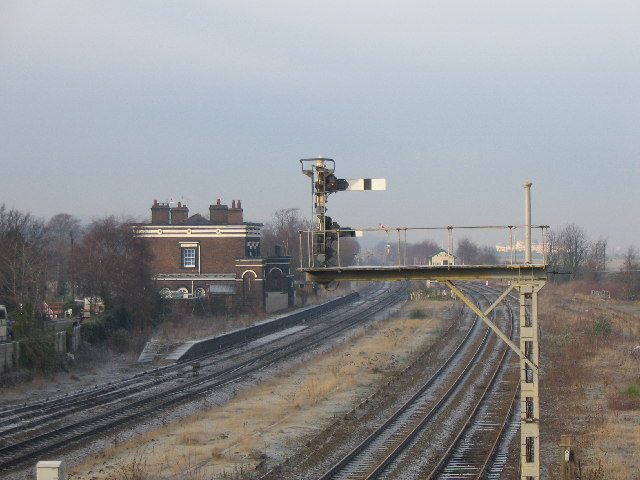
Holywell Junction station

The station was opened on 1 May 1848 as part of the Chester and Holyhead Railway (now the North Wales Coast Line) and was named simply Holywell. A brick built signal box was opened in 1902 to replace an earlier wooden one. The station initially had two platforms but as the line grew busier the number of tracks doubled from one each way to two and the number of platforms followed suit. The main station building was positioned on the down platform and a subway connected them all. In 1912 Holywell Branch Line was opened just east of the station which linked the mainline to the centre of Holywell. Therefore, Holywell station was renamed Holywell Junction on 1 May and the new station called Holywell Town.

The branch line lasted 42 years before being closed and Holywell Junction was closed to passengers on 14 February 1966 as part of the Beeching Axe, although it was open to freight until 1970. The Italianate station building designed by Francis Thompson was listed Grade II* in 1970 and is a private dwelling. The signal box was listed Grade II in 1991.

== Governance ==
Greenfield is an electoral ward of the town of Holywell, within the Flintshire County Council local authority.

The village is within the Delyn Senedd constituency and the Clwyd East UK parliamentary constituency.

== See also ==
- Holy Trinity Church, Greenfield
