= Bagillt railway station =

Former railway station in Flintshire, Wales

Bagillt
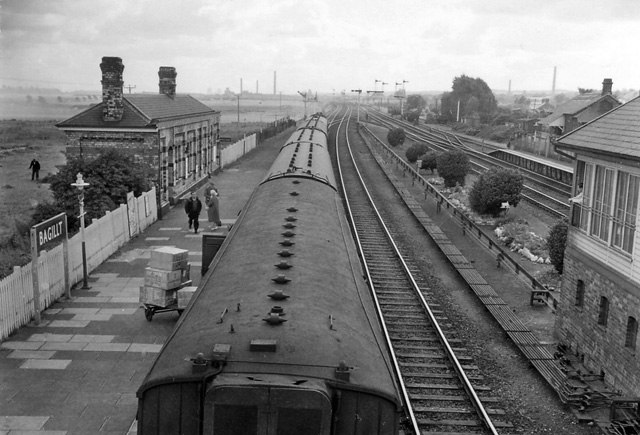
- Bagillt railway station in 1962

General information
- Location: Bagillt, Flintshire; Wales
- Coordinates: 53.2692°N 3.1677°W
- Grid reference: SJ221753
- Platforms: 2

Other information
- Status: Disused

History
- Original company: Chester and Holyhead Railway
- Pre-grouping: London and North Western Railway
- Post-grouping: London Midland and Scottish Railway

Key dates
- January 1849: First station opens as Bagilt
- c. 1860: First station renamed Bagillt
- 1871: Replaced by second station
- 14 February 1966: Closes
Location

Bagillt railway station was a railway station serving the village of Bagillt in Flintshire, North Wales on the North Wales Coast Line. Although trains still pass on the main line, the station closed in 1966.

== History ==
Opened by the Chester and Holyhead Railway, then joining the London and North Western Railway, the station became part of the London Midland and Scottish Railway during the Grouping of 1923. The station then passed on to the London Midland Region of British Railways on nationalisation in 1948, and was closed by the British Railways Board as part of the Beeching Report economies of the 1960s.

Preceding station	Historical railways	Following station
Flint; Line and station open	London and North Western Railway; North Wales Coast Line	Holywell Junction; Line open, station closed

== The site today ==
Trains still pass on the double track North Wales Coast Line. The remains of the platforms are visible from passing trains, including the footbridge.

== Sources ==
- Butt, R. V. J. (October 1995). The Directory of Railway Stations: details every public and private passenger station, halt, platform and stopping place, past and present (1st ed.). Sparkford: Patrick Stephens Ltd. ISBN 978-1-85260-508-7. OCLC 60251199. OL 11956311M.
- Jowett, A. (2000). Jowett's Nationalised Railway Atlas. Atlantic Publishing. ISBN 0-906899-99-0.
