= Bagillt =

- Village and community
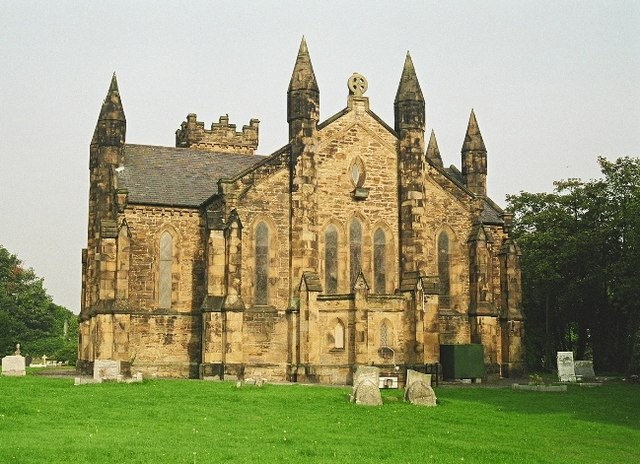
- St Mary's Church in Bagillt

- Location within Flintshire
- Population: 3,969 (2021)
- OS grid reference: SJ221752
- Community: Bagillt
- Principal area: Flintshire
- Preserved county: Clwyd
- Country: Wales
- Sovereign state: United Kingdom
- Settlements: List: Bagillt; Walwen; Whelston
- Post town: BAGILLT
- Postcode district: CH6
- Dialling code: 01352
- Police: North Wales
- Fire: North Wales
- Ambulance: Welsh
- UK Parliament: Alyn and Deeside
- Senedd Cymru – Welsh Parliament: Delyn
- Website: Council website
- List of places UK Wales Flintshire 53.268°N 3.168°W Map of the community

Bagillt (/ˈbæɡɪlt/; Welsh pronunciation: [ˈbaɡɪɬt]) is a village and community in Flintshire, Wales. The village overlooks the Dee Estuary and is between the towns of Holywell and Flint. At the 2001 Census the population was recorded as 3,918, increasing to 4,165 at the 2011 census. The community also includes the settlements of Coleshill, Walwen and Whelston.

== History ==
Bagillt was part of the Kingdom of Gwynedd in the early medieval period. In the 12th century, Owain Gwynedd and his forces retreated to Bryn Dychwelwch, the "Hill of Retreat", above Bagillt while being pursued by superior numbers of Henry II's forces. Castell Hen Blas, a motte-and-bailey castle, lies within the boundaries of Bagillt. It was the birthplace of Dafydd ap Llywelyn, Prince of Wales, probably around Easter 1212. The castle ruins were partially excavated in the mid-1950s. Dafydd's birth was commemorated by the unveiling of a plaque on the wall of the Upper Shippe Inn in the centre of the village on 25 July 2010; this was 770 years since the issue of his earliest surviving charter as prince.

Mostyn Hall, the seat of one of the oldest Welsh families, lies close to Bagillt. Parts of the building date from the time of Henry VI in the 15th century. The future Henry VII is said to have been concealed in the Hall by the lord of Mostyn, Richard ap Howel, during the reign of Richard III. The Hall now houses antiquities and manuscripts pertaining to British and Welsh history that were brought from Gloddaeth Hall, Llanrhos.

=== Industrial Revolution ===
The Gadlys Lead Smelting Works was established by Edward Wright and his associates, who were generally Quakers, in 1704. Organised as the London Lead Company, they kept the workshop open until 1799. John Freame, one of the founders of Barclays Bank, was involved in this initiative.

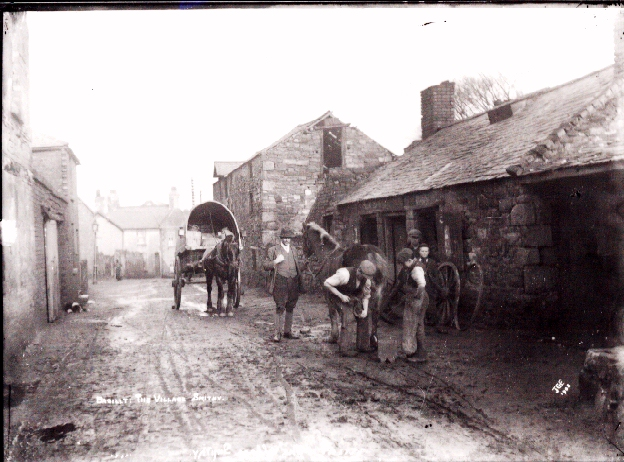
The blacksmiths in Bagillt, 1908

By the late 18th century, Bagillt had become a centre of mineral extraction and manufacturing. Hundreds of men laboured in eleven collieries that surrounded the village. There was also a factory and works that produced and refined zinc, lead and iron.

Bagillt already had several quays on the banks of the River Dee, where fishing boats had moored for centuries. But by the early 19th century, these had grown into docks where cargo destined for the factories and foundries of England were loaded.

In 1846, navvies laying track for the North Wales Coast Line reached Bagillt. The Chester and Holyhead Railway (now part of the North Wales Coast Line) officially opened on 1 May 1848. The local mines and works that had used these wharves now switched to haulage by steam train. Bagillt railway station had extensive sidings and goods yard. It was closed in 1966 as part of the Beeching cuts, although the station's footbridge still remains.

In 1879 a working men's club and cocoa house was built on the High Street in the Pentre area by public subscription. The building was named the Foresters Hall; it is an impressive three-storey red brick building which is supported by the Bagillt Heritage Society. It was built to promote temperance and was originally associated with the Foresters Friendly Society. It was the first cocoa house built in Wales.

The industrial age created problems: in 1848, the same year the railway opened, a book was published entitled Reports of the Commissioners of Inquiry into the state of education in Wales. It detailed the poverty and hard living of many people in Bagillt and the Flintshire coalfields in the 19th century:

In some of the collieries the men are paid every other Saturday, and do not return to their work till the following Tuesday or Wednesday. In Bagillt and in the adjoining town of Flint the old Welsh custom of keeping a merry night (noswaith lawen) is still prevalent, and, being generally reserved for a Saturday, is protracted to the following Sunday, during which drinking never ceases. The custom is represented by the clergy and others as involving the most pernicious consequences.

I saw two men stripped and fighting in the main street of Bagillt, with a ring of men, women and children around them. There is no policeman in the township. The women are represented as being for the most part ignorant of housewifery and domestic economy. The girls are very early sent to service, but marry as early as 18, and have large families.

Women are not employed in or about the mines, but spend most of their time in cockling, or gathering cockles on the beach. They have low ideas of domestic comfort, living in small cottages dirty and ill-ventilated, and at night are crowded together in the same room, and sometimes in the same bed, without regard to age or sex.

Bagillt remained a hard-working boom town for more than a century. For instance on 31 May 1873, a local newspaper, the Wrexham Advertiser, reported that so many new coal workings had opened near Bagillt that it was becoming difficult to find enough miners to work in them:

No less than four new collieries have been recently started near Mold, and it is becoming a serious question how to get labour to work them, all the men available in the district being already engaged. The colliery nearest the town on the north side is named Hard Struggle from the difficulty experienced in obtaining water to get up steam. Another to the east side is named Slap Bang from the fact that coal has been found near the surface. To the south the Linger and Die company are doing their best to reduce the price of coal and to enhance that of labour. While to the south east the Strip and at it company are showing the world how to make the most of it. We hear of numberless other ventures, but these are the principal.

In July 1897 work commenced at Boot End, Bagillt, on the huge Milwr Tunnel which would drain water from the mines working the lead lodes under Pentre Halkyn. Digging started at a point 9 feet (2.7 m) below high-water mark on the Dee foreshore. The tunnel was driven southwest at a gradient of 1:1000. It was brick-lined where it passed through coal measures and shale but unlined after the first 1.5 miles where it passed through chert and limestone. In 1908 the tunnel was draining more than 1.7 million gallons of water per day through the drainage channel and into the river at Bagillt.

Bagillt was also the site of the Hawarden Iron Works, situated near the Dee Bank Quay. It was famous for production of a number of waterwheels, including the Snaefell Wheel at Laxey, Isle of Man.

By the 1930s the Great Depression brought hardship to the area, as many of the manufacturing works and collieries closed. Large numbers of people were now out of work and in severe financial hardship. The area was now falling into long-term decline and before the Second World War many people left in search of work: some moved to cities like Cardiff, Manchester and Liverpool while others went overseas to Canada and America.

=== Modern era ===
Bagillt and Greenfield remain areas where unemployment, social deprivation and child poverty are key issues. A report in 2004/05 called Flintshire Childcare Sufficiency Assessment concluded that child care was needed to help parents.

The Parent Childcare Survey found that 17% of women not in work (6% of all women with children) said that they did not work because they couldn’t find suitable childcare. This figure represents approximately 660 families across Flintshire. If childcare were accessible to these women, the local economy would benefit by around £11.5m per year through earnings alone.

According to North Wales Police, the overall crime rate in Bagillt East rose by 200% from 2007 to 2008; in Bagillt West this figure was only +3.7% in the same period.

In 2013, Bagillt was formally twinned with Laxey, Isle of Man, after a visit to Laxey by members of Bagillt Heritage Society to see the Snaefell Wheel (now renamed the Lady Evelyn) recently restored by the Laxey and Lonan Heritage Trust. The wheel was built in Bagillt (see above).

Bagillt lies on a former section of the A548 road. A by-pass was built in the late 1960s for the A road. The town's facilities include a community-run library, reopened in 2014 following closure by Flintshire County Council in 2011, a few local shops, pubs and parkland. The Wales Coast Path passes through Bagillt by the side of the River Dee, and the Bagillt Heritage Society have signposted a Heritage and Industrial Trail from the Wales Coast Path to various sites around the village. The Bagillt Heritage Society also acquired the old sewage works near the site of the former Bagillt Railway Station for a future Community Gardens Project.

Bagillt is home to two county primary schools, Ysgol Merllyn, located in the main village area, and Ysgol Glan Aber, in Bagillt Boot End.

== Argentina ==
In the late 19th century, many Welsh families from NE Wales emigrated to the Chubut Valley in Patagonia, Argentina. In honour of their heritage, the people of Y Wladfa named Lago Bagillt (Bagillt Lake) after the village (43.269°S 71.687°W). There is also Nant Bagillt river and Cors Bagillt in the area.

== Governance ==
Bagillt Community Council was created in 1985. It consists of two wards (called East and West), each of which elects seven councillors.

The community is a single electoral ward on Flintshire County Council (called Bagillt), and elects two councillors.

It is part of the Delyn constituency and North Wales region for the Senedd, and of the Alyn and Deeside constituency for Parliament.
