= St. Marys railway station =

St Marys railway station may refer to:

- St Marys railway station, Sydney, NSW, Australia
- St. Marys station (Ontario), Canada
- St. Marys Junction station, Ontario, Canada
- St. Mary's railway station (England), disused railway station in the village of Ramsey St Mary's, Cambridgeshire, England
- Wisbech St Mary railway station, disused railway station in the village of Wisbech St Mary, Cambridgeshire, England
- St Mary's (Whitechapel Road) tube station, disused underground station in Whitechapel, London, UK
