= Holy Trinity Church, Greenfield =

Church in Flintshire, Wales

Coordinates: 53.2894°N 3.2102°W

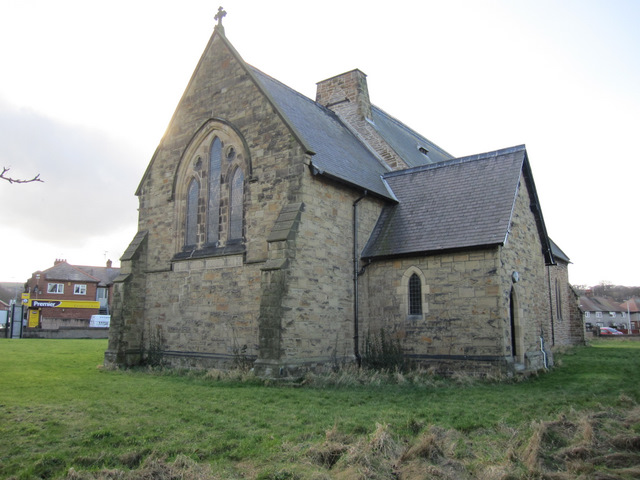
Holy Trinity Church

Holy Trinity Church, Greenfield, is in Basingwerk Avenue, Greenfield, Flintshire, Wales (grid reference SJ194776). It is an active Anglican church in the former parish of Holywell, the Estuary and Mountain Mission Area, the archdeaconry of St Asaph and the diocese of St Asaph. The church was designated as a Grade II listed building on 19 August 1991.

The church was built in 1870–71 to a design by Ewan Christian. It consisted of a nave and a south aisle, and had lancet windows. Christian planned an apsidal chapel and a vestry at the southeast, but these were never built. The church was licensed for worship on 18 October 1871. In 1910–11 the Chester architect John Douglas added a chancel in a simpler design. The church was consecrated on 25 April 1911. The current Vicar of Holywell is the Rev'd Dominic Austin Cawdell OGS.

== See also ==
- List of church restorations, amendments and furniture by John Douglas
