= Talacre railway station =

Former railway station in Flintshire, Wales

Talacre

General information
- Location: Talacre, Flintshire; Wales
- Coordinates: 53.3449°N 3.3294°W
- Grid reference: SJ116839
- Platforms: 2

Other information
- Status: Disused

History
- Original company: London and North Western Railway
- Pre-grouping: London and North Western Railway
- Post-grouping: London, Midland and Scottish Railway

Key dates
- 1 May 1903: Opened
- 14 February 1966: Closed
Location

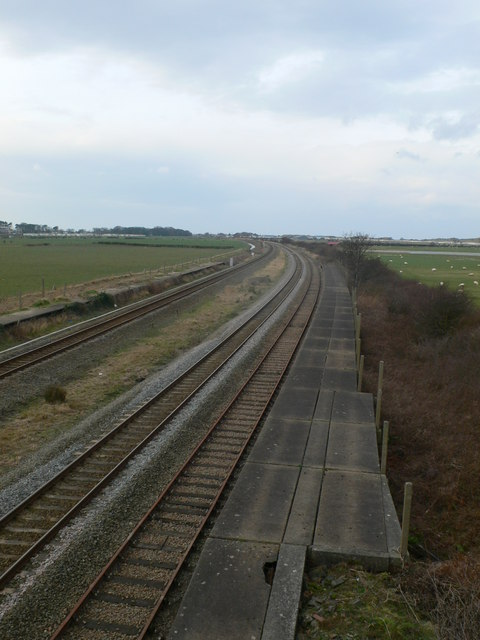
An image of Talacre railway station

Talacre railway station served the village of Talacre, in Flintshire, North Wales on the North Wales Coast Line.

== History ==
The station was opened in 1903 by the London and North Western Railway. Platforms were provided on the slow lines only. The station closed in February 1966, as part of the cost-saving reforms introduced by Dr Beeching.

Following closure parts of the platforms (in 2020) were still in situ. The signalbox remained in use until closure in March 2018 – for many years this controlled access to the busy exchange sidings for the nearby Point of Ayr Colliery. The mine closed in 1996 and the site has since been cleared, but the disused sidings are still visible from passing trains.

Preceding station	Historical railways	Following station
Prestatyn; Line and station open	London and North Western Railway; North Wales Coast Line	Mostyn; Line open; station closed
