= St Winefride's Halt railway station =

Former railway station in Flintshire, Wales

St Winefride's Halt

General information
- Location: Holywell, Flintshire; Wales
- Coordinates: 53.2779°N 3.2218°W
- Grid reference: SJ185763
- Platforms: 1

Other information
- Status: Disused

History
- Original company: London and North Western Railway
- Pre-grouping: London and North Western Railway
- Post-grouping: London, Midland and Scottish Railway

Key dates
- 1 July 1912: Opened
- 6 September 1954: Closed
Location

St Winefride's Halt railway station was a station in Holywell, Flintshire, Wales. The station was opened on 1 July 1912 and closed on 6 September 1954. Situated on a bend there was a curved wooden platform with just the name board and gas lighting. There was a siding running behind the platform at a lower level to serve local industries. There are no remains of the halt today.

| Preceding station | Disused railways | Following station |
|---|---|---|
| Holywell Junction; Line and station closed | London and North Western Railway; Holywell Branch Line | Holywell Town; Line and station closed |
