= Holywell Junction railway station =

Former railway station in Flintshire, Wales

Holywell Junction
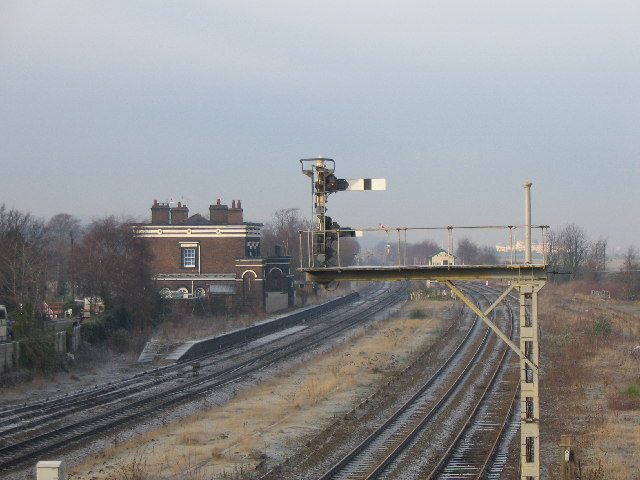
- Holywell Junction station

General information
- Location: Greenfield, Flintshire; Wales
- Coordinates: 53.2922°N 3.2065°W
- Grid reference: SJ195779
- Platforms: 5

Other information
- Status: Disused

History
- Original company: Chester and Holyhead Railway
- Pre-grouping: London and North Western Railway
- Post-grouping: London, Midland and Scottish Railway

Key dates
- 1 May 1848: Opened
- 14 February 1966: Closed to passengers
- c.1970: Closed for goods traffic
- 2020-21: Proposals for reopening as Greenfield or Holywell
- 2029: Proposed reopening

Listed Building – Grade II*
- Feature: Holywell Junction railway station
- Designated: 1 October 1970
- Reference no.: 510
Location

Holywell Junction was a junction railway station located on the north-eastern edge of the town of Holywell and village of Greenfield, in Flintshire, North Wales. It is sited on the North Wales Main Line, beside the estuary of the River Dee.

== History ==
The station was opened on 1 May 1848, as part of the Chester and Holyhead Railway (now the North Wales Coast Line) and was named simply Holywell.

The Italianate station building was designed by Francis Thompson and built by Thomas Hughes of Liverpool. A brick-built signal box was opened in 1902 to replace an earlier wooden one.

Initially, the station had two platforms but, as the line grew busier, the number of tracks doubled from to two and the number of platforms followed suit. The main station building was positioned on the down platform and a subway connected them all. In 1912, the Holywell Branch Line was opened just east of the station, which linked the main line to the centre of Holywell. The station was therefore renamed Holywell Junction on 1 May and the new station in the town centre was called Holywell Town.

Preceding station	Disused railways	Following station
Mostyn; Line open; station closed	London and North Western Railway; North Wales Coast Line	Bagillt; Line open; station closed
Terminus	London and North Western Railway; Holywell Branch Line	St Winefride's Halt; Line and station closed

=== Accidents and incidents ===
On 1 September 1922, four trackworkers were run over by a passenger train and killed instantly.

== Closure ==
The branch line lasted 42 years before being closed and Holywell Junction was closed to passengers on 14 February 1966, as part of the Beeching Axe, although it was open to freight until 1970.

== The site today ==
The station building was listed Grade II* in 1970 and is now a private dwelling. The signal box was listed Grade II in 1991.

Trains on the North Wales Main Line continue to pass through the station site.

Greenfield Valley is a tarmacked footpath that follows the length of the former branch line to Holywell town centre.

== Proposed reopening ==
Proposals to reopen a station in Greenfield, either on or near to the former Holywell Junction railway station site, was announced in 2019; Holywell Town Council and its Mayor supported a case to reopen the station.

The proposals to reopen are largely based on that the state of the former station platforms remain highly intact. The private owner of the old station house announced that their property will not be part of any station reopening.

In July 2020, the Welsh Government included a proposal for a station named Holywell in their long-term aspirations for the North Wales Coast Line.

In September 2021, Transport for Wales released its future developments plan, with a station named Greenfield marked as proposed in their short-term section of the plan to 2029. Hannah Blythyn, MS for Delyn, welcomed the plans for a new station. In January 2022, Rob Roberts MP for Delyn, took part in an adjournment debate in the House of Commons to raise the issue with Parliamentary Under Secretary, Robert Courts.

Preceding station	Future services	Following station
Prestatyn	Transport for Wales Rail North Wales Coast Line	Flint
