= Holywell, Flintshire =

Market town and community in Flintshire, Wales

Holywell: Welsh: Treffynnon
- Market town and community
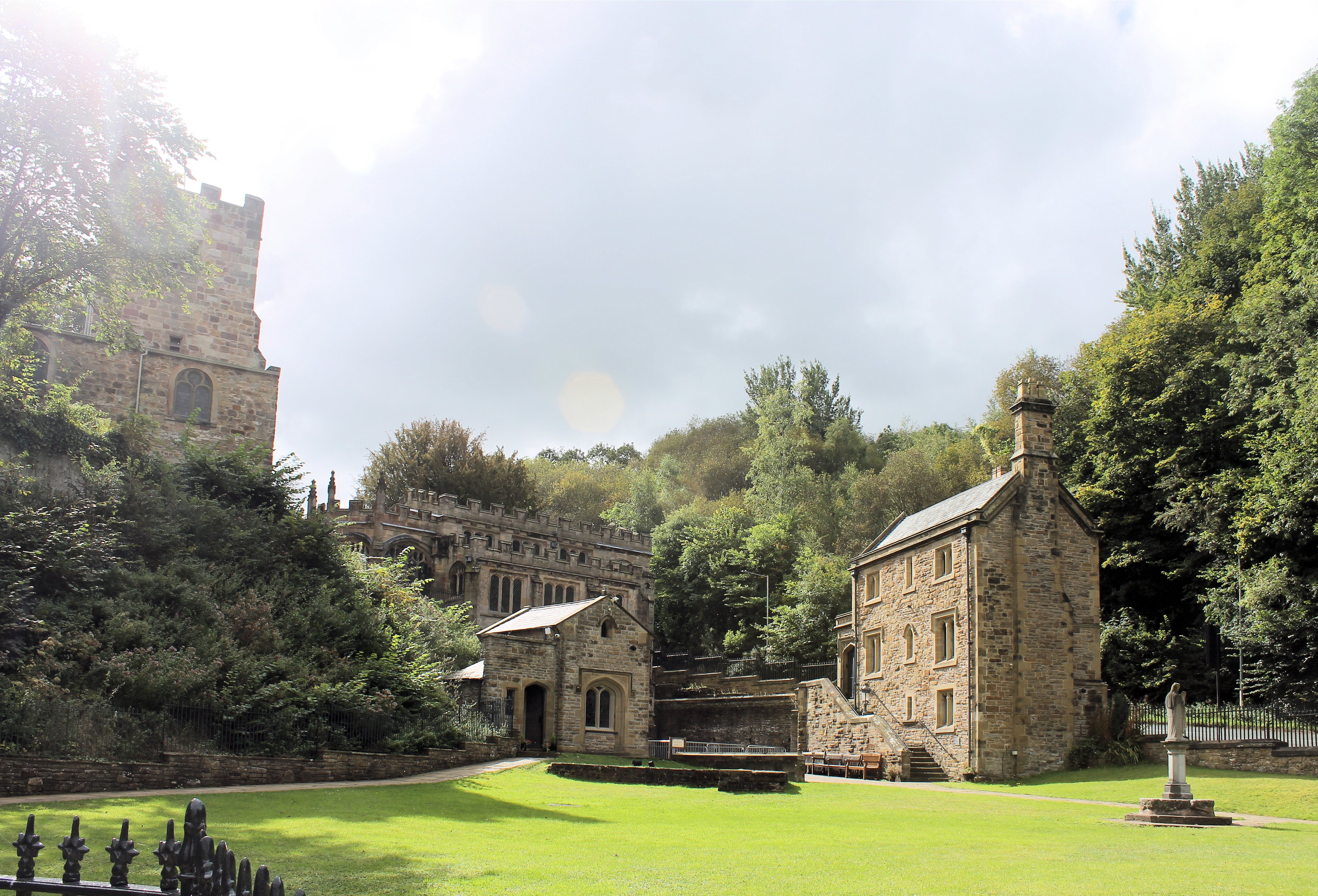
- St Winefride's Well, with St James' Church in the top-left

- Location within Flintshire
- Population: 8,886 (2011 census)
- OS grid reference: SJ185755
  - Cardiff: 124 mi (200 km)
  - London: 178 mi (286 km)
- Principal area: Flintshire
- Preserved county: Clwyd
- Country: Wales
- Sovereign state: United Kingdom
- Post town: HOLYWELL
- Postcode district: CH8
- Dialling code: 01352
- Police: North Wales
- Fire: North Wales
- Ambulance: Welsh
- UK Parliament: Clwyd East
- Senedd Cymru – Welsh Parliament: Delyn
- Website: holywell.wales
- List of places UK Wales Flintshire 53.274°N 3.223°W Map of the community

Holywell (/ˈhɒliwɛl/ HOLL-ee-wel; Welsh: Treffynnon) is a market town and community in Flintshire, Wales. It lies to the west of the estuary of the River Dee. The community includes Greenfield. In 2011, it had a population of 8,886.

== Toponymy ==
The name Holywell is literally holy + well in reference to St Winefride's Well, which is situated in the town. Similarly, its Welsh name, Treffynnon, is a compound of tre "town" + ffynnon "well", meaning "town of [the] well".

== History ==
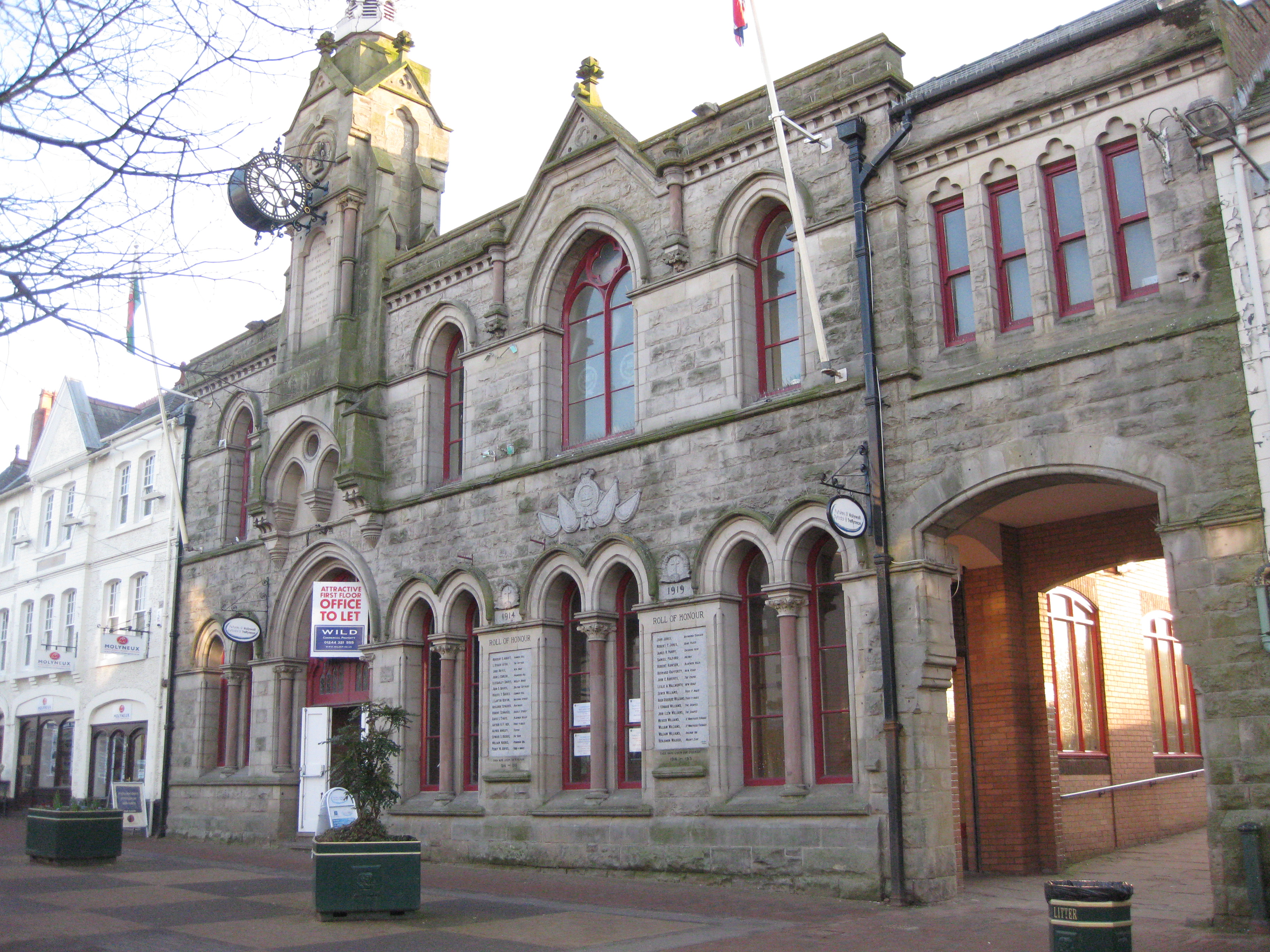
Holywell Town Hall

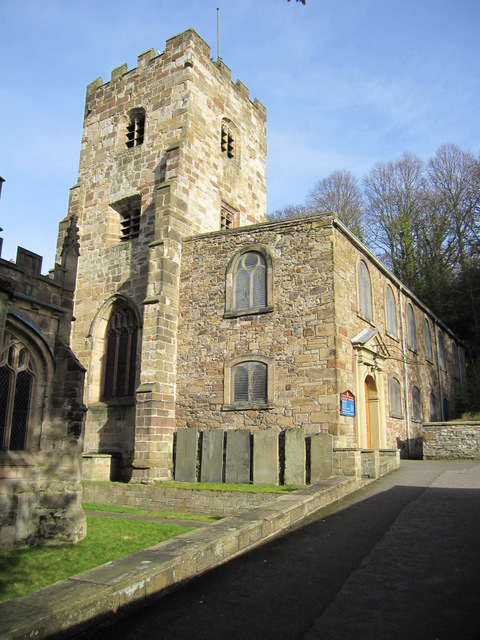
St James’ parish church

The market town of Holywell is known for St Winefride's Well, a holy well surrounded by a chapel. It has been a site of Christian pilgrimage since about 660, dedicated to Saint Winefride who, according to legend, was beheaded there by Caradog who attempted to attack her. The well is one of the Seven Wonders of Wales and the town bills itself as The Lourdes of Wales. Many pilgrims from all over the world continue to visit Holywell and the well.

From the 18th century, the town grew around the lead mining and cotton milling industries. The water supply from the mountains above the town, which flows continually and at a constant temperature, supplies the well and powered many factories in the Greenfield Valley. In addition to lead and cotton, copper production was of great importance. Thomas Williams, a lawyer from Anglesey, built factories and smelteries for copper in Greenfield Valley, bringing the copper from Anglesey to St. Helens and then to Greenfield Valley where it was used to make items including manilas (copper bracelets), neptunes (large flat dishes to evaporate seawater to produce salt) and copper sheathing. The copper sheathing was used to cover the hulls of the wooden ships trading in the warmer Caribbean waters, giving rise to the expression 'copper bottomed investment'. The sheathing was also applied to Royal Navy ships and was instrumental in Nelson's victories - two copper plates from HMS Victory are in Greenfield Valley Heritage Park museum. The wealth generated from these industries led to the development of the town. Holywell Town Hall was completed in 1896.

St James' Parish Church is a grade II* listed building and Holy Trinity Church in Greenfield is grade II listed. The town is also served by the modern St Peter's Church on Rose Hill, consecrated in 2008.

=== Railway ===
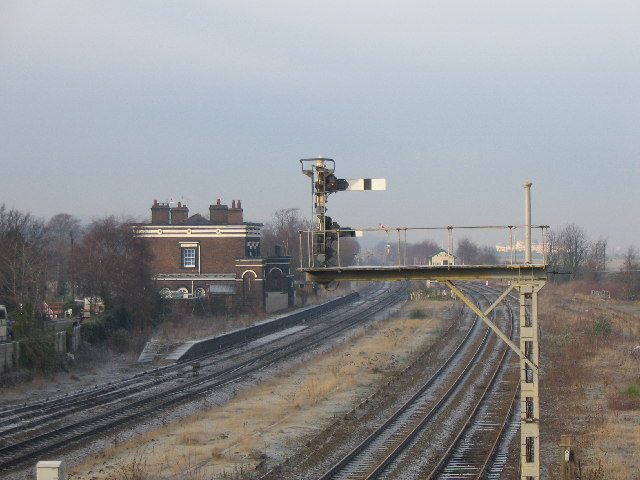
Holywell Junction station

Holywell Junction railway station in Greenfield was a stop on the North Wales Coast Line. The station was closed in 1966 and trains now run through the site; the station building, by Francis Thompson for the Chester and Holyhead Railway (1848), is listed Grade II*. There is a campaign to reopen the station.

Holywell Town railway station, at the head of the steeply-climbing LNWR Holywell branch line from Holywell Junction, opened in 1912 and finally closed in 1957. It now forms part of the Greenfield Valley, a tarmacked path.

== Demography ==
In the 2011 census the population of the community, which includes the village of Greenfield, was recorded as 8,886. The census figure for the larger Holywell built-up area was 9,808.

The community consists of four electoral wards of the Flintshire County Council local authority:

Ward	2001 census	2011 census
Greenfield	2,741	2,741
Holywell Central	1,835	1,988
Holywell East	1,828	1,758
Holywell West	2,311	2,399
Holywell Total	8,715	8,886

== Geography ==
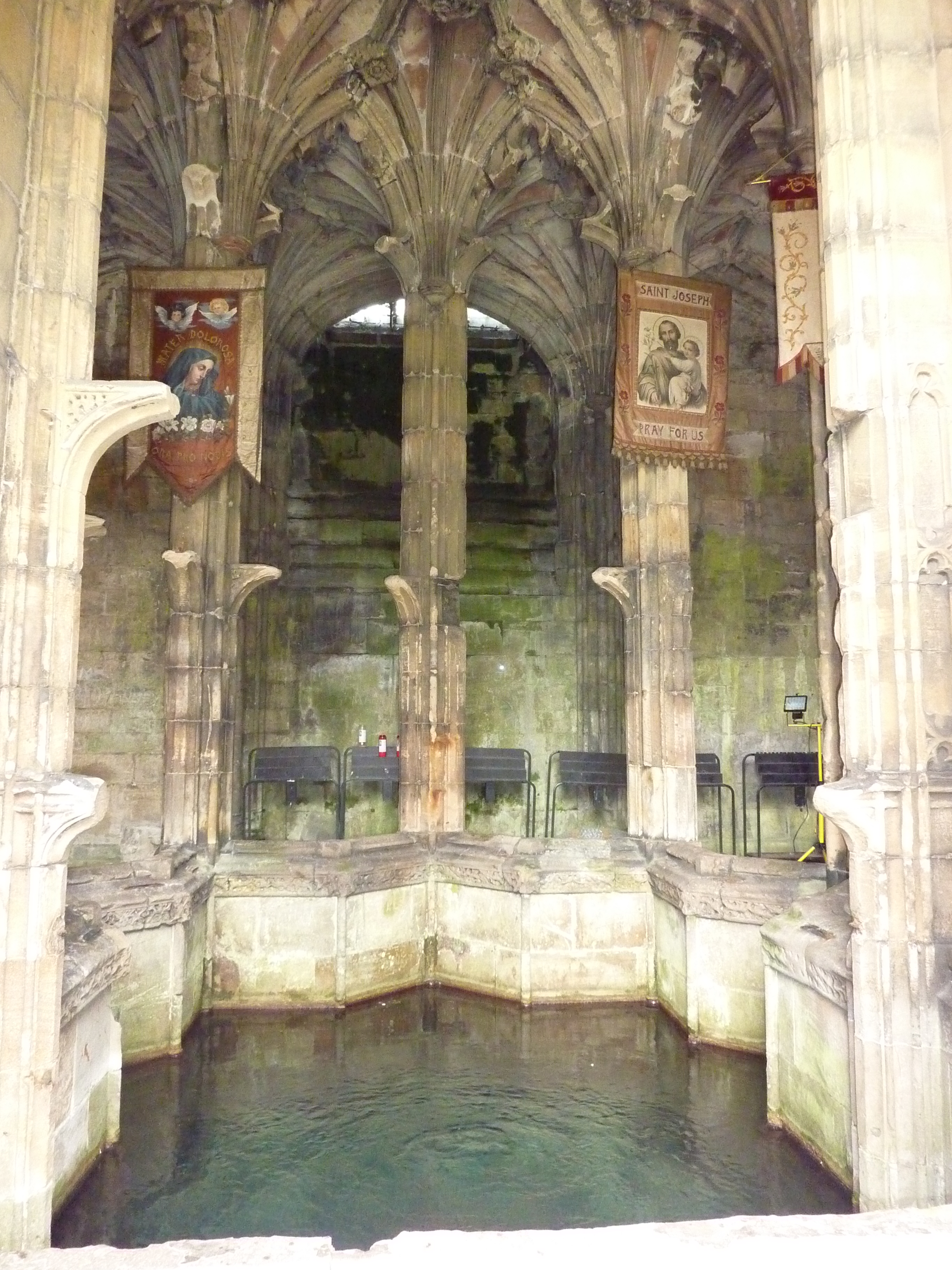
St Winefride's Well, Holywell

Holywell is split into four distinct areas: Pen-y-Maes, the Strand, the Holway and the town centre. The Holway, located on the west side of the town, is the largest of the residential areas of Holywell. The near-contiguous village of Greenfield is located to the north east of the town on the B5121 road.

Villages within the Holywell catchment area include: Bagillt, Brynford, Carmel, Gorsedd, Halkyn, Holway, Lixwm, Lloc, Mostyn, Pantasaph, Pentre Halkyn, Rhes-y-Cae, Trelawnyd, Whitford and Ysceifiog. In addition there are other smaller scattered communities within this area. All of these are within a six-mile radius of Holywell. These villages are all connected to Holywell by a frequent bus service.

== Amenities ==
The town centre contains many small businesses and national stores, serving not only the shopping needs of the people of the town itself, but also those of the surrounding villages within the town's natural catchment area. Part of the centre of the historic market town has been designated a conservation area.

The town contains a secondary school, with over 500 pupils, and four primary schools. There is also a leisure centre.

The old cottage hospital was located in Pen-y-Maes until it closed. A new facility, known as the Holywell Community Hospital, opened in March 2008.

In 2007, a group of locals proposed a circular walk way, the St Beuno's Circular Walk, joining all of the historical and religious locations of the town.

== Sport ==
Holywell has a local football team, Holywell Town who play in the Cymru North league, the second tier of Welsh football.

Although Holywell does not have a cricket team carrying the name of the town, a number of junior and senior cricketers from the area play for nearby village team Carmel & District Cricket Club; their ground is located a short distance from Holywell between the villages of Carmel and Lloc.

== Transport ==
The nearest railway station to Holywell is now at Flint, 5 miles (8 km) away; it is a stop on the North Wales Main Line. Transport for Wales operates services to Holyhead, Llandudno, Chester, Shrewsbury, Birmingham International, Manchester Piccadilly and Manchester Airport.

Arriva Buses Wales operates a regular service on route 11 to Chester, via Flint railway station.

== Notable people ==
- Saint Winifred, a 7th century Welsh virgin martyr, inspired St Winefride's Well
- Thomas Pennant (1726–1798) naturalist, traveller, writer and antiquarian; lived at Downing Hall near Whitford
- Rear Admiral Thomas Totty (1746–1802) naval officer of the Napoleonic Wars
- Sarah Edith Wynne (1842–1897) operatic soprano and concert singer
- Teresa Helena Higginson (1844–1905) Roman Catholic mystic
- Charles Sidney Beauclerk (1855–1934), Catholic priest, revived the town as a pilgrimage centre
- Frederick Rolfe (1860–1913), gay novelist and obsessive letter writer; died in Venice
- Emlyn Williams (1905–1987) writer, dramatist and actor, attended Holywell Grammar School
- Sir Ronald Waterhouse (1926–2011), High Court judge
- Dorothy Miles (1931–1993) poet and activist in the deaf community
- Jennifer Toye (1933–2022), operatic soprano with the D'Oyly Carte Opera Company
- Ann Clwyd (1937–2023) politician, MP for Cynon Valley for 35 years; went to Holywell Grammar School
- Jonathan Pryce (born 1947), actor on film and TV, educated at Holywell Grammar School
- Gareth Jones (born 1961), TV presenter, (Gaz Top) brought up in Holywell
- Richard and Adam (Johnson) (born ca.1980), classical singers

=== Sport ===
- Gerry Hitchens (1934–1983), footballer with over 500 club caps, retired to Holywell from 1977 where he is buried
- Alan Fox (1936–2021) footballer with 441 club caps mainly for Wrexham A.F.C.
- Mike England (born 1941), footballer and manager, with 622 club caps and 44 for Wales
- Ron Davies (1942–2013), footballer with 644 club caps and 29 for Wales
- Barry Horne (born 1962), footballer with 570 club caps and 59 for Wales
- Ian Buckett (born 1967), Wales rugby player, born near Holywell and attended school in Holywell
- Gareth Jelleyman (born 1980) footballer, with over 360 club caps

== See also ==
- Holywell Workhouse Chapel
- St Winefride's Church, Holywell
