= Holywell Town Hall =

Municipal Building in Holywell, Wales

- Neuadd y Dref Treffynnon (Welsh)
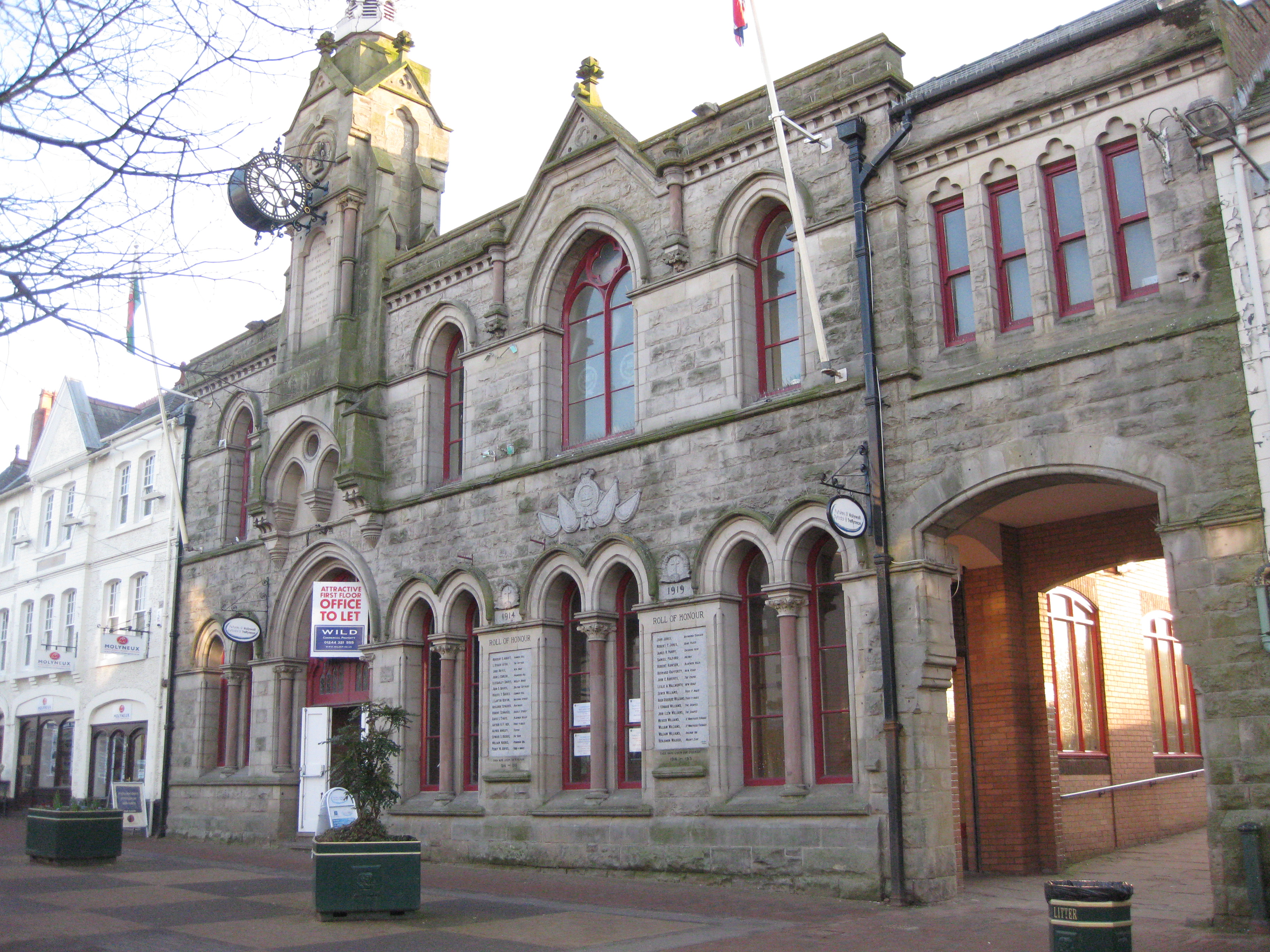
- Holywell Town Hall

- Shown in Flintshire
- 53.2737°N 3.2224°W
- Location: High Street, Holywell

History
- Built: 1896

Site notes
- Architect: Richard Lloyd Williams
- Architectural style: Gothic Revival style

Listed Building – Grade II
- Official name: Façade of Former Town Hall
- Designated: 19 August 1991
- Reference no.: 447

Holywell Town Hall (Welsh: Neuadd y Dref Treffynnon) is a municipal structure in the High Street in Holywell, Wales. The façade of the town hall, which is the only surviving part of the original structure, is a Grade II listed building.

== History ==
The earliest part of the structure is a tower which was erected in the High Street in 1867 to commemorate the coming of age of Pyers William Mostyn, the son of Sir Pyers Mostyn of Talacre Hall. Although Holywell was an established market town it had no market hall: this issue was resolved when a market hall was erected on the southwest side of the High Street in 1878. Following a significant growth in population, largely associated with the lead mining and cotton milling industries, Holywell became an urban district in 1894. In this context, the new civic leaders decided to procure a town hall: the site they selected was just in front of the market hall.

The new building was designed by Richard Lloyd Williams in the Gothic Revival style, built by Abel Jones of Rhyl in rubble masonry with ashlar dressings and was completed in 1896. The design involved an asymmetrical main frontage with six bays facing onto the High Street; the second bay on the left was formed by the original Mostyn tower, which was relocated from its original site to form the centrepiece of the new structure. On the ground floor, there was an arched doorway with a fanlight flanked by colonettes supporting a hood mould; the tower, which was supported by machicolated brackets, took the form of a panel bearing an inscription recording the coming of age of Pyers William Mostyn surmounted by a projecting clock, a carved roundel and an octagonal bellcote. The third bay, which was gabled, contained a large arched window with tracery on the first floor while the sixth bay contained an arched carriageway on the ground floor and a four-light window on the first floor. The other bays contained mullioned windows on the ground floor and lancet windows on the first floor. The writer, Edward Hubbard, was unimpressed by the design which he considered "thoroughly behind the times".

Internally, the principal room was the main assembly hall: events held in the assembly hall in the early 20th century included a performance of Handel's oratorio, The Messiah, in April 1909. The building served as the headquarters of the Holywell Urban District Council until 1970, when the council moved to a new building called Civic Offices on Coleshill Street. The Civic Offices passed to the new Delyn Borough Council when local government was reorganised in 1974. After the empty town hall began to deteriorate, the structure behind the façade was demolished and replaced by a modern office complex in 1986.

After a grant of £495,000 from the National Lottery Community Fund was approved in March 2007, an extensive programme of refurbishment works was carried out at the town hall and completed in November 2012. The works included the provision of accommodation for North Wales Police, for Deeside College, and for a Jobcentre Plus.
