= Francis Thompson (architect) =

English architect

- Born: 25 July 1808; Woodbridge, Suffolk
- Died: 23 April 1895 (aged 86); Bredfield, Suffolk
- Occupation: Architect
- Buildings: Midland Hotel, Derby; Conwy Railway Bridge; Victoria Bridge (Montreal)

Francis Thompson (25 July 1808–23 April 1895) was an English architect particularly well known for his railway work.

== Early life ==
Thompson was born in Woodbridge in Suffolk, England, the second of seven children of George Thompson and his wife Elizabeth (née Miles). George Thompson was a builder and the Suffolk county surveyor, descended from a family of farmers in the nearby village of Bredfield. Francis' grandfather Jacob was also a builder and two of his uncles were architects. Thompson attended Woodbridge Grammar School and his family's background instilled him with an interest in architecture.

He married Anna Maria Watson on 17 May 1830 in Woodbridge church. The couple soon emigrated to Montreal in British North America (now in Quebec, Canada). Their son, Francis Jacob, was born the following year. Anna died of cholera in 1832 as a result of the second cholera pandemic, a global outbreak which killed 4,000 people in Montreal. Thompson designed multiple houses, commercial buildings, courts, and a church. In 1832, he worked with John Wells (another English emigrant) to build St. Anne's Market, which was temporarily used for the pre-confederation Canadian parliament. Thompson returned to England in 1837, prompted by growing friction between French and British settlers.

== Railway work ==
Although at first sight Thompson was young and inexperienced, Robert Stephenson the engineer for the North Midland Railway (NMR), recruited him to be the railway company's architect in February 1839. The North Midland was in the early stages of building its line 72 miles (116 kilometres) north from Derby to Leeds. He designed many publicly acclaimed buildings, including multiple railway stations and warehouses. In Derby, he designed a compete railway town, featuring Derby Trijunct station (opened 1840), the meeting point for three railway companies. The station had a three-bay glazed train shed and a two-storey, red-brick frontage in an Italianate style, described as "the first really great station". Thompson was also responsible for a cluster of buildings around the station, including a roundhouse, terraced houses for the workers, and the Midland Hotel, which is among the most representative of his surviving works. The group was the world's first complete complex of railway buildings. The station was remodelled several times in the intervening century and almost completely rebuilt in the 1980s. Thompson designed 13 stations for the NMR, including Belper and Eckington, both since rebuilt, Ambergate (where Thompson's original building survives but has been superseded by newer buildings). Wingfield railway station, in northern Derbyshire, is the only one Thompson's station buildings to survive largely as-built and is a grade II* listed building. Notable for his criticism of the extravagant nature of the railway architecture of the day, Whishaw nevertheless praised Thompson's works in Derby, writing:

The admirably contrived and elegant roofs, the spacious platforms, the great length of the whole erection extending to upwards of a thousand feet. All unite in rendering it the most complete structure of the kind in the United Kingdom or perhaps the world.

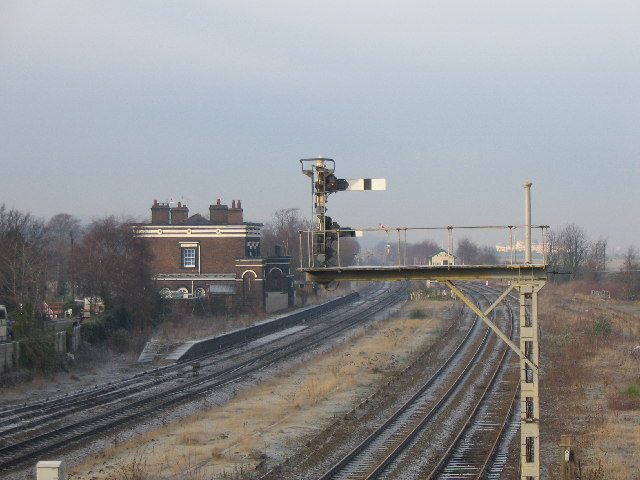
Holywell Junction station which is Italianate and Grade II* listed.

Thompson and Stephenson went on to work together on the Chester and Holyhead Railway, for which Thompson designed the architectural elements of the Britannia Bridge over the Menai Strait as well as the Italianate Chester railway station, the frontage of which closely resembles the original station at Derby. The bridge was largely destroyed by fire in 1970, though Thompson's masonry work was incorporated into the rebuilt structure. Among his other works on the line were the stations at Holywell Junction, Flint, and Mostyn (now disused), Conwy, and Bangor. Thompson was also the architect on the Conwy Railway Bridge, including making the towers castellated in order to match the nearby 13th-century Conwy Castle. The Britannia and Menai bridges both used Stephenson's pioneering tubular design. Cambridge railway station, along with Great Chesterford and Audley End on the Eastern Counties Railway, were initially credited to Sancton Wood but are now believed to be the work of Thompson.

== Canada again ==
Thompson remarried in 1840. His second wife, Elizabeth, died in 1852, and on 30 June 1853, he married Mary Ann Groves, from Wareham, Dorset. The couple sailed for Canada, and Thompson took up employment with the Grand Trunk Railway and the St. Lawrence and Atlantic Railroad. He designed Union station in Portland, Maine, which was claimed to be the largest station in America when it opened in 1855. He also designed the masonry for the Victoria Bridge in Montreal, another Stephenson-designed tubular bridge, as well as multiple other stations (St. Marys Junction station c. 1858) and railway workshops.

The Thompsons returned to London in April 1859. In 1866, he retired to a house he built in Hastings in Sussex, before finally moving home to Bredfield in Suffolk, where he died on 23 April 1895. He was buried in the local cemetery. Although well paid during his career, retirement rained Thompson's wealth and he died in poverty without leaving a will.
