= List of hotels of the London, Midland and Scottish Railway =

The following hotels were owned by the London, Midland and Scottish Railway:

- Euston Hotel, London
- Queen's Hotel, Birmingham
- Midland Hotel, Bradford
- Crewe Arms Hotel, Crewe
- Midland Hotel, Derby
- Furness Abbey Hotel, Furness Abbey
- Station Hotel, Holyhead
- Queens Hotel, Keighley
- Queen's Hotel, Leeds
- Adelphi Hotel, Liverpool
- Exchange Hotel, Liverpool
- Midland Hotel, Manchester
- Midland Hotel, Morecambe
- Park Hotel, Preston
- North Stafford Hotel, Stoke-on-Trent
- Welcombe Hotel, Stratford-upon-Avon
- Station Hotel, Ayr
- Dornoch Hotel, Dornoch (open May to September only)
- Station Hotel, Dumfries
- Caledonian Hotel, Edinburgh
- Central Hotel, Glasgow
- St. Enoch Hotel, Glasgow
- Gleneagles Hotel, Gleneagles (open Easter to November only)
- Station Hotel, Inverness
- Lochalsh Hotel, Kyle of Lochalsh
- Highland Hotel, Strathpeffer (open May to September only)
- Turnberry Hotel, Turnberry
- Midland Station Hotel, Belfast
- Laharna Hotel, Larne (open June to September only)
- Northern Counties Hotel, Portrush
- Greenore Hotel, Greenore (with the GNR(I))

== See also ==
- Lists of hotels – an index of hotel list articles on Wikipedia
