= Midland Hotel, Derby =

Midland Hotel
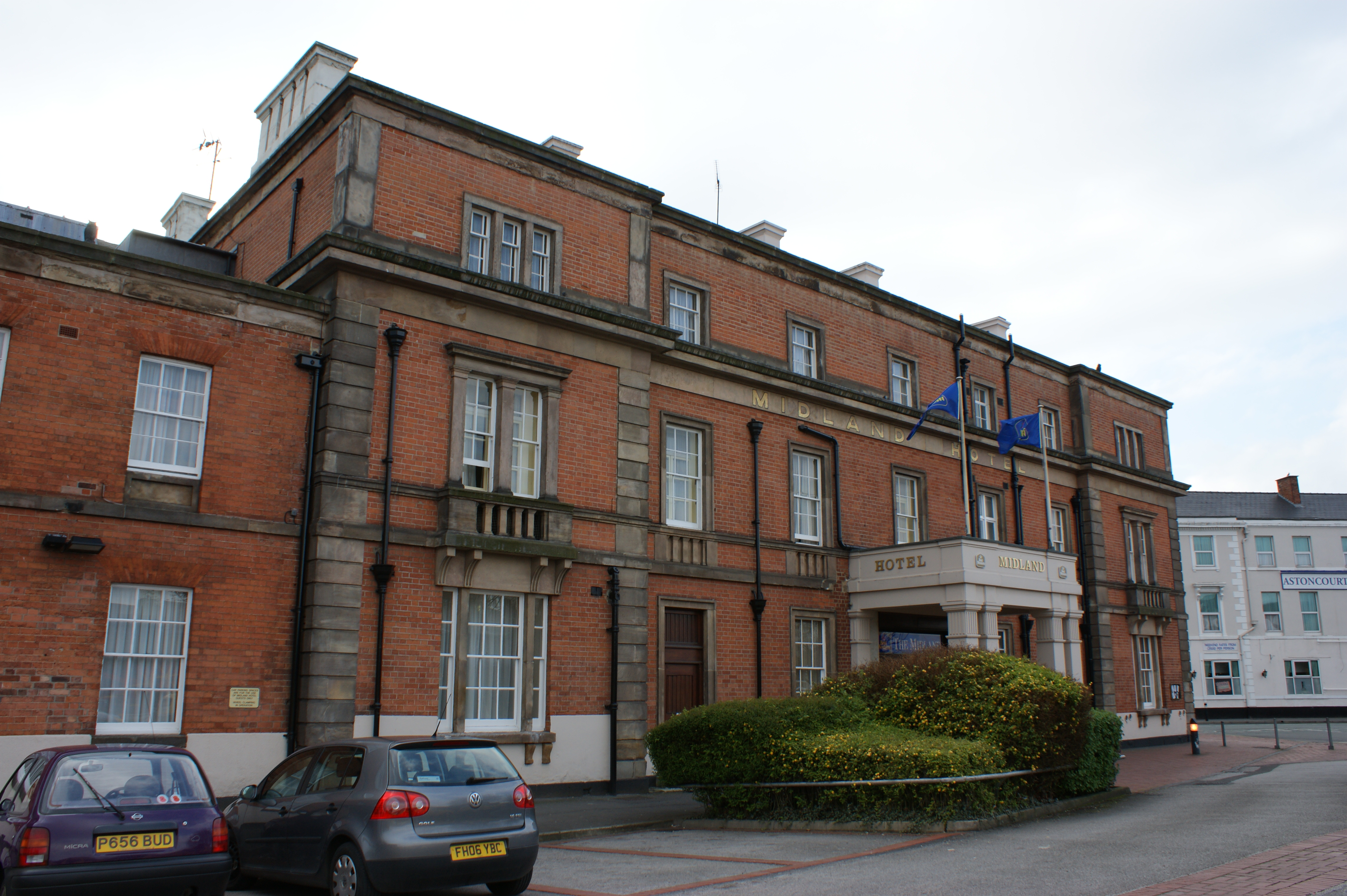
- Front entrance, opposite the railway station
- Interactive map of the Midland Hotel area

General information
- Status: Grade II listed building
- Type: Hotel
- Location: Midland Road, Derby, England
- Coordinates: 52°54′56″N 1°27′50″W
- Opened: 1841
- Client: North Midland Railway

Technical details
- Floor count: 3

Design and construction
- Architect: Francis Thompson

The Midland Hotel, also known as Hallmark Hotel Derby Midland, is a hotel on Midland Road in Derby in the East Midlands of England, adjacent to Derby railway station. It is the oldest extant purpose-built station hotel in the world.

== Architecture and history ==
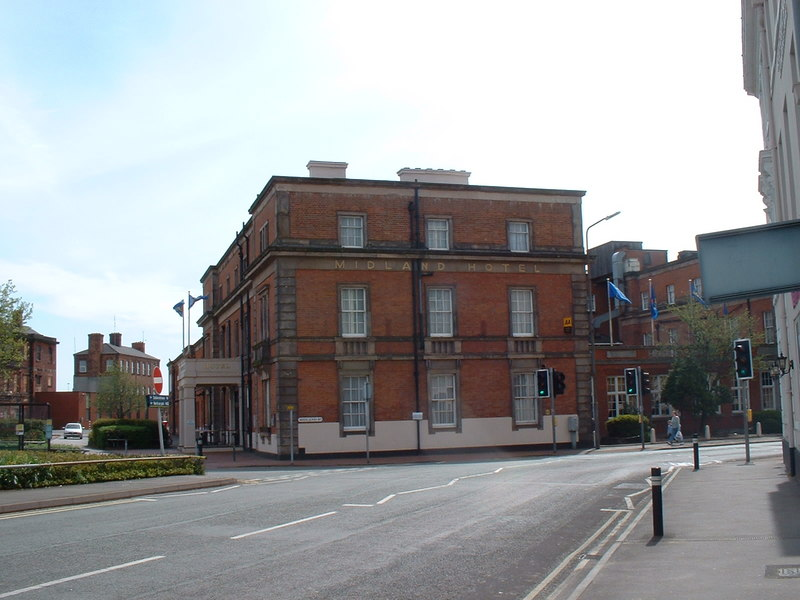
Midland Road side of the hotel, viewed from Railway Terrace outside the main railway station building

The hotel was designed by Francis Thompson for the North Midland Railway and built by Thomas Jackson of Pimlico. It opened in 1841 as the Midland Hotel and Posting House and is today a grade II listed building.

On 28 September 1849, Queen Victoria, Prince Albert and the Royal Family stayed overnight in the hotel whilst travelling back from Balmoral Castle to Osborne House.

It was originally a separate enterprise until the Midland Railway purchased it in 1860. The Midland Railway was one of the largest railway companies in Britain. It established itself in Derby more comprehensively than any other railway company in any other town. Derby came to be dominated by railway-related buildings, and the Midland became the town's largest employer. Among its ventures were multiple railway hotels, of which Derby was one of the first.

The original building is of red brick construction with a rectangular plan, three storeys high with seven bays at the front. The outer bay on either side protrudes slightly. A stone cornice runs beneath the second-floor windows. The windows are decorated with stone frames and balconets (above the ground floor). The inner bays contain singular windows while on the outer bays the windows are arranged in pairs on the first floor and triplets on the top and bottom floors. A second building, designed by William Henry Hamlyn and built by Holliday and Greenwood was added behind the original between 1933 and 1938, linked to the main building by a single-storey block on the Midland Road side. The second building is also in red brick and of a rectangular plan, with a further three storeys of five bays.

The hotel was at one time connected to the station by a glass-covered walkway, and its cellars were linked to the station's via an underground passage. The main entrance, originally on the Midland Road side, was moved to face the station during the 1930s expansion. The hotel was acquired by the London, Midland & Scottish Railway after the Midland was amalgamated as a result of the Railways Act 1921 and then by British Rail (through British Transport Hotels) upon nationalisation. British Rail began disposing of its hotel estate and sold the Midland Hotel in 1982. After the demolition of the Euston Hotel in London, the Midland Hotel became the oldest surviving railway hotel in Britain.

The hotel is a grade II listed building and part of Derby's Railway Conservation Area, which encompasses many railway-related buildings to the east of Derby city centre. The conservation area includes the station, multiple surrounding buildings, and the Midland Railway War Memorial, adjacent to the hotel on Midland Road.

== Modern Use ==
As of 2020, it was understood that the Midland Hotel would be closed for large parts of the year to house refugees and asylum seekers. In 2022, it was reported that the hotel would be closed to all guests year-round to house asylum seekers, causing some controversy around the use of hotels in the asylum process. In 2025, the Government announced the closure of nine hotels hosting asylum seekers after a Home Office spokesperson stated "We are absolutely committed to ending the use of hotels", but refused to confirm if the Midland Hotel was among them.

== See also ==
- List of hotels of the London, Midland and Scottish Railway
