= Holywell branch line =

Former railway line in Flintshire, Wales

The Holywell branch line was a railway branch line in Flintshire, North Wales, that connected Holywell with the North Wales Coast Line at Holywell Junction. Holywell had large reserves of mineral resources and the branch line was built originally as a mineral railway. When the local industry declined, the line fell into disuse, but it was reopened as a tourist passenger line in 1912. Road competition made the railway non-viable, which caused the line to be closed in 1954.

== Origin ==
The Chester and Holyhead Railway built a line along the North Wales Coast; the objective was to connect the port of Holyhead with London, by connecting with other railway companies. This would enable the Irish mail, chiefly at the time government dispatches, to be conveyed.

The C&HR opened its line as far west as Bangor in 1848 and it opened the entire line throughout, after completion of the Britannia Tubular Bridge in 1850. A station named Holywell was opened on the eastern part of the line on 1 May 1848; however, the town it served was 1 1/2 miles away, at an elevation of 550 feet.

Holywell was significant as there were extensive deposits of metal ores, coal and limestone, which together enabled the production of metals. Textiles were also produced locally. By 1850, the local industry had become of prime importance. Holywell had used a small harbour as its main export route, with a tramway to reach it from the town.

== Construction ==
Holywell Railway Act 1864
- Act of Parliament
- Parliament of the United Kingdom
- Long title: An Act to authorize the Construction of Railways or Tramways from the Town of Holywell to Greenfield in the County of Flint, and to the Holywell Station of the Chester and Holyhead Railway; and for other Purposes.
- Citation: 27 & 28 Vict. c. cccxxviii

Dates
- Royal assent: 29 July 1864

Text of statute as originally enacted

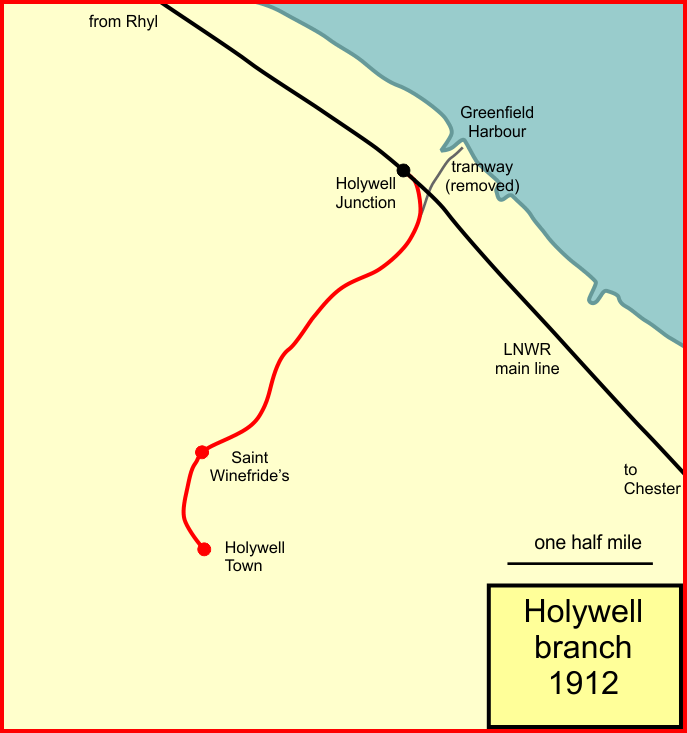
The Holywell branch line

On 29 July 1864, theHolywell Railway was authorised by the Holywell Railway Act 1864 (27 & 28 Vict. c. cccxxviii); it was to be two miles in length, running from the town to a new harbour and crossing the Chester to Holyhead line (now transferred to the ownership of the London and North Western Railway) by a bridge, instead of the former level crossing.

The Undertaking to be made and maintained under the Authority of this Act, will be the following; (that is to say,)

- Railway No. 1. To make and maintain a Railway or Tramway, commencing in the Yard at the Rear of the White Horse Hotel, in the Town of Holywell in the Parish of Holywell in the County of Flint, and thence passing from, in, through, or into the Town and Parish of Holywell aforesaid, and the Township of Greenfield, and running in a North-eastwardly Direction into the Foreshore or Bed of the River Dee, and terminating at or near a Point about Two hundred Yards North-east of the Pier or Quay belonging to Mrs. Sarah Frances Crockford in Greenfield aforesaid, in the Parish of Holywell in the said County of Flint:
- Railway No. 2. A Railway or Tramway wholly situate in the said Parish of Holywell and County of Flint, commencing by a Junction with the said intended Railway No. 1. at a Point about Two hundred Yards along the said intended Railway from the intended Terminus thereof in the Rear of the White Horse Hotel, in Holywell aforesaid, and thence passing in a South-eastwardly Direction and terminating at a Point on the West Side of the Road forming the Continuation of Bagillt Street in Holywell aforesaid, in a Field belonging to Lord Viscount Fielding and others, and in the Occupation of Henry. Williams:
- Railway No. 3. A Railway or Tramway wholly situate in the Parish of Holywell and Township of Greenfield and County of Flint, commencing by a Junction with the said intended Railway No. 1. at a Point about Ten Yards North-east of a Stone Erection, situate in a Field belonging to the said Mrs. Sarah Frances Crockford, in the Occupation of Mr. Clement Williamson, and thence passing in a curved Line and terminating by a Junction with the Line of the Chester and Holyhead Railway at the Holywell Station of the said Chester and Holyhead Railway.

— Section 20, Holywell Railway Act 1864 (27 & 28 Vict. c. cccxxviii)

The first turf was cut with much ceremony in May 1867, and by August 1869 the line was completed and work was being carried out to complete the goods station (close to the White Horse Hotel) and the passenger station (at the rear of the Spread Eagles Inn), however in June 1870 it was reported that while the line was completed it remained 'inactive'. There were aspirations that it would be continued to Mold, but in the end the branch never opened for traffic and the company failed. In 1875 it was reported that the whole of the sewage of the greater part of the town of Holywell is becoming lodged in the cutting for the unused Holywell Railway.

== Acquisition by the LNWR and eventual opening for traffic ==
In December 1892 the London and North Western Railway (LNWR) company sumbitted plans to purchase the old line built by the Holywell Railway Company "which, though constructed thiry years ago, has never been used". Whatever the motivation was for the purchase, nothing was done with the acquired railway for some time, although conversion to an electric tramway in the 20th century was considered. The LNWR had itself operated road omnibuses between Holywell main line station and the town from 11 October 1905; the commercial success of that service encouraged the LNWR to redevelop the railway.

The London and North Western Railway Act 1906 (6 Edw. 7. c. lxxiii) and the London and North Western Railway Act 1907 (7 Edw. 7. c. lxxxvii) permitted the regeneration and a connecting spur to the Chester–Holyhead main line. Although the new line was only 1 1/2 miles in extent, it was not until 1 July 1912 that the reopening to passengers and freight took place.

The ruling gradient was 1 in 27; there was a single intermediate station called St Winifride's. Holywell, on the main line, was redesignated Holywell Junction. The Holywell terminus was named Holywell Town.

== Stations ==
- Holywell Junction (53.2923°N 3.2072°W). Station on the main line was named Holywell; opened 1 May 1848; renamed Holywell Junction in 1912; closed 14 February 1966
- St Winefride's Halt. Opened 1 July 1912; closed 6 September 1954
- Holywell Town (53.2752°N 3.2210°W). Opened 1 July 1912; closed 6 September 1954.

== Service ==
The passenger rolling stock consisted of two former picnic saloons, converted to form an auto-train. (Note: An auto train consisted of a small steam locomotive and a passenger coach with controls capable of operating the locomotive's own controls. When the driving trailer was leading, the driver operated the locomotive from a driving position in the coach.)

At first, there were sixteen passenger train journeys each way on weekdays; this was increased to 29 each way before 1939. The summer 1938 Bradshaw shows 26 Monday to Friday departures up the branch, from 06:25 to 23:30. A similar number ran on Saturdays.

== Closure ==
After 1945, the competition from road transport led to the rapid decline of the usage of the branch; it was closed on 6 September 1954, except for a stub to Crescent Textile Mills which continued in use until 11 August 1957. Holywell Junction station, on the main line, remained in use under that name until its closure in February 1966.

== The line today ==
The line forms the Greenfield Valley, which is a tarmacked footpath that follows the length of the former branch line.
