= Mostyn railway station =

Former railway station in Flintshire, Wales

Mostyn
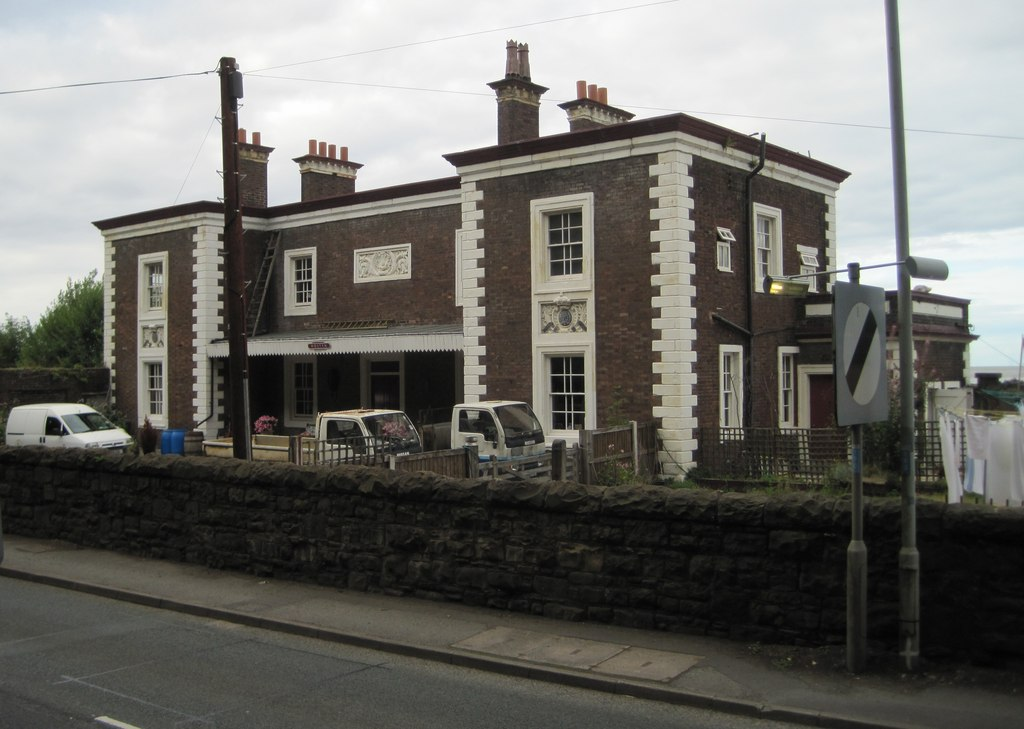
- Former Mostyn station building

General information
- Location: Mostyn, Flintshire; Wales
- Coordinates: 53.3201°N 3.2742°W
- Grid reference: SJ153812
- Platforms: 4

Other information
- Status: Disused

History
- Original company: Chester and Holyhead Railway
- Pre-grouping: London and North Western Railway
- Post-grouping: London, Midland and Scottish Railway

Key dates
- 1 May 1848: Opened
- 14 February 1966: Closed
Location

Mostyn railway station is a disused railway station north west of Mostyn in Flintshire, North Wales.

== History ==
Situated on the A548 it was opened on 1 May 1848 as part of the Chester and Holyhead Railway (now the North Wales Coast Line). On 1 January 1859 ownership of the line and station passed into the hands of the London and North Western Railway and in 1923 it became part of the London, Midland & Scottish Railway (LMS) until nationalisation in 1948 and the creation of British Railways (London Midland Region), from 1965 rebranded British Rail.

There were originally two platforms to serve the two lines running through the station. In the late 19th century the number of lines were doubled. One platform was changed to an island platform and a further platform constructed, giving a total of four. A footbridge over the lines linked them together. The main station building was a brick built in Itiianate style and was supplemented by a goods shed in the sidings which served the quay. A signal box, built in 1902, was located at the south-east end of the site and is now Grade II Listed Building.

=== Closure ===
Steady decline in the mid-20th century meant that it closed for goods services on 4 May 1964 and the station closed fully on 14 February 1966. In the 1980s the line reverted to double track and in the 1990s the footbridge was removed. The station building itself is still in existence as a private dwelling and the goods shed can still be seen.

Mostyn signalbox closed in October 2017.

Preceding station	Historical railways	Following station
Holywell Junction; Line open; station closed	London and North Western Railway; North Wales Coast Line	Talacre; Line open; station closed
