= Whelston =

Village in Flintshire, Wales

Coordinates: 53.2784°N 3.1877°W

Whelston is a village located in the Bagillt community council in Flintshire, Wales. It is just off the A548 coast road, and has been signposted as Boot End since 2002. Boot End is a colloquial name for the areas of Whelston, Walwen, Riverbank, and New Brighton in Bagillt.
