= Midland Railway War Memorial =

War memorial in Derby, England

- United Kingdom
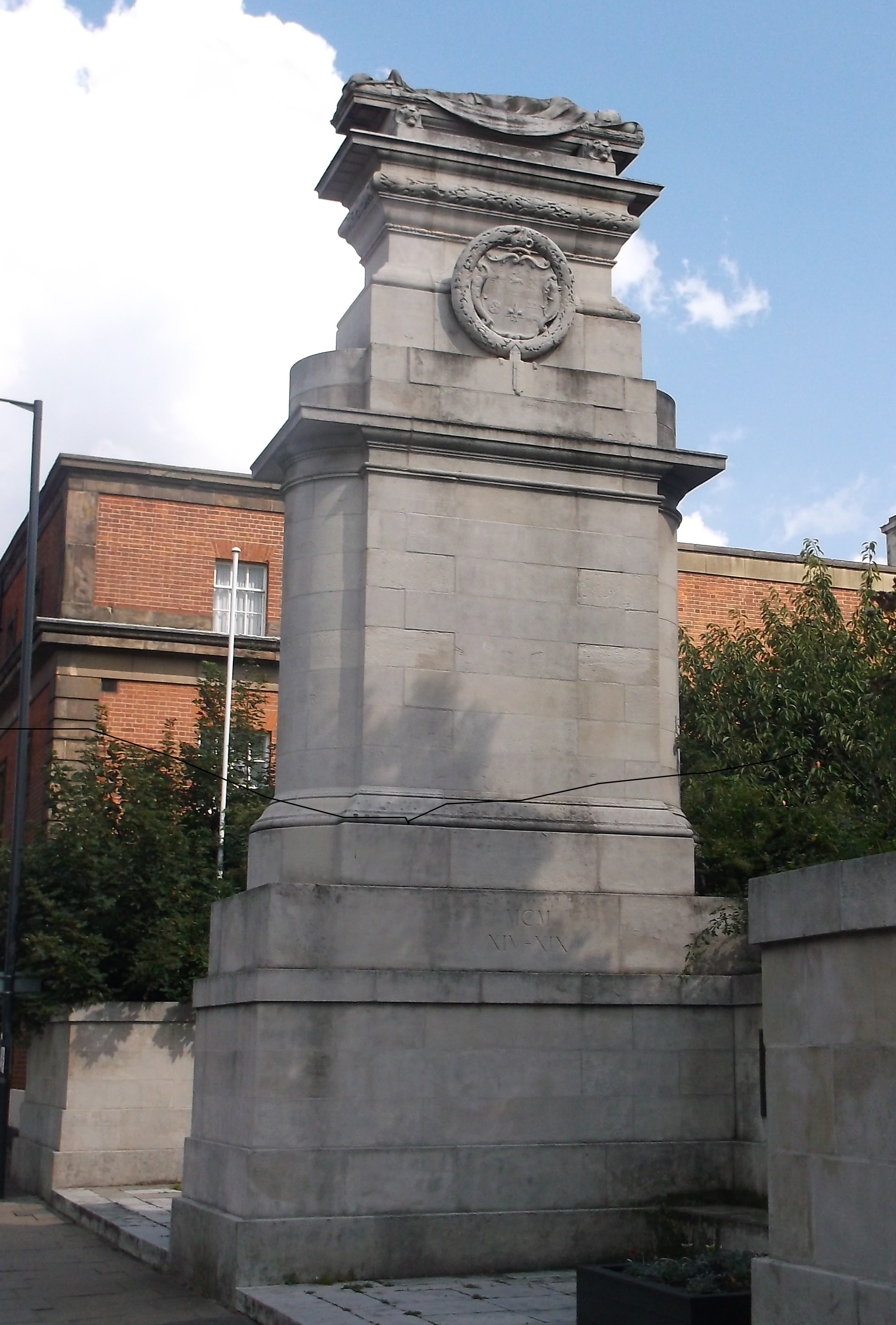
- For employees of the Midland Railway killed in the First World War
- Unveiled: 15 December 1921
- Location: 52°54′56″N 01°27′53.2″W; Midland Road, Derby
- Designed by: Sir Edwin Lutyens
- Commemorated: 2,833
- TO THE BRAVE MEN OF THE MIDLAND RAILWAY WHO GAVE THEIR LIVES IN THE GREAT WAR

Listed Building – Grade II*
- Official name: Midland Railway War Memorial
- Designated: 24 February 1977
- Reference no.: 1228742

The Midland Railway War Memorial is a First World War memorial in Derby in the East Midlands of England. It was designed by Sir Edwin Lutyens and unveiled in 1921. The memorial commemorates employees of the Midland Railway who died while serving in the armed forces during the First World War. The Midland was one of the largest railway companies in Britain in the early 20th century, and the largest employer in Derby, where it had its headquarters. Around a third of the company's workforce, some 23,000 men, left to fight, of whom 2,833 were killed.

Standing on Midland Road, within sight of Derby railway station and backing on to the garden of the Midland Hotel, the memorial consists of a cenotaph partially enclosed by a screen wall on three sides. Affixed to the wall are bronze plaques listing the names of the dead. On either side of the cenotaph is the Midland's coat of arms, enclosed in a laurel wreath. The crest is surmounted by a catafalque with sculpted lion heads at the corners, supporting the recumbent effigy of a soldier, covered by a coat. Lutyens renders the soldier anonymous by lifting him high above eye level, allowing the viewer to believe it could be somebody they knew.

The memorial was unveiled on 15 December 1921. The Midland also published a book of remembrance, a copy of which was sent to the families of all the men listed on the memorial. In 1923, the Midland Railway amalgamated with other railways to create a larger company and Derby's importance as a railway centre waned. Today, the memorial stands in a conservation area and is a grade II* listed building. It was repaired in 2010 after several of the bronze plaques were stolen and later recovered.

== Background ==
=== Midland Railway ===
In the early 20th century, the Midland Railway was one of the largest railway companies in Britain. The Midland had its headquarters in Derby, establishing itself there more comprehensively than any other railway company in any other town in Britain. It was the town's largest employer—at the turn of the century, it employed over 12,000 people in Derby alone. The Midland dominated the town; it erected dozens of buildings, including Midland station and the Midland Hotel. Railways remained the town's largest industry until the middle of the 20th century.

Railway companies contributed heavily to the British war effort in the First World War. Many carriages were repurposed for use on hospital trains, railway works were given over for weapons manufacturing, and most troop movements within Britain were made by train. The railways also gave up large numbers of their employees for military service—across all British railway companies, approximately 185,000 joined the armed forces (almost half of fighting-age men employed by the railways, the remainder of whom were mostly in "reserved occupations", required for domestic service). The Midland's workforce was reduced by a third as almost 23,000 men left for war. As a result, the Midland and other railway companies began employing women on a large scale for the first time.

The company published a pamphlet, titled For King and Country, in December 1914, giving details of Midland employees who had joined the armed forces by that date. Within a week of the United Kingdom declaring war on Germany in August, over 1,800 reservists had been called up, and hundreds more employees had volunteered; to be able to carry on its operations, the company began asking employees to obtain permission from management before "joining the colours". In the same pamphlet, the company promised to re-employ the men on their return, and to pay an allowance to their families while the men were gone. By the end of the war, 2,833 men from the Midland had been killed; their names are listed on the war memorial. Another 7,000 were wounded.

The cenotaph is one of several Midland-related war memorials in Derby. A plaque commemorating the company's casualties from the Second Boer War is affixed to the wall on platform 1 at the nearby station. As Derby diminished in importance as a railway centre and the Midland's workshops and offices closed, it was joined by three other plaques listing the names of First World War casualties from individual sites.

=== Architect ===
In the aftermath of the war and its unprecedented casualties, thousands of memorials were built across Britain. Amongst the most prominent designers of memorials was Sir Edwin Lutyens, described by Historic England as "the leading English architect of his generation". Lutyens established his reputation designing country houses for wealthy clients and later built much of New Delhi, but the war had a profound effect on him. Thereafter, he dedicated much of his time to commemorating its casualties. He became renowned for The Cenotaph in London, which became Britain's national memorial, and for his work for the Imperial War Graves Commission.

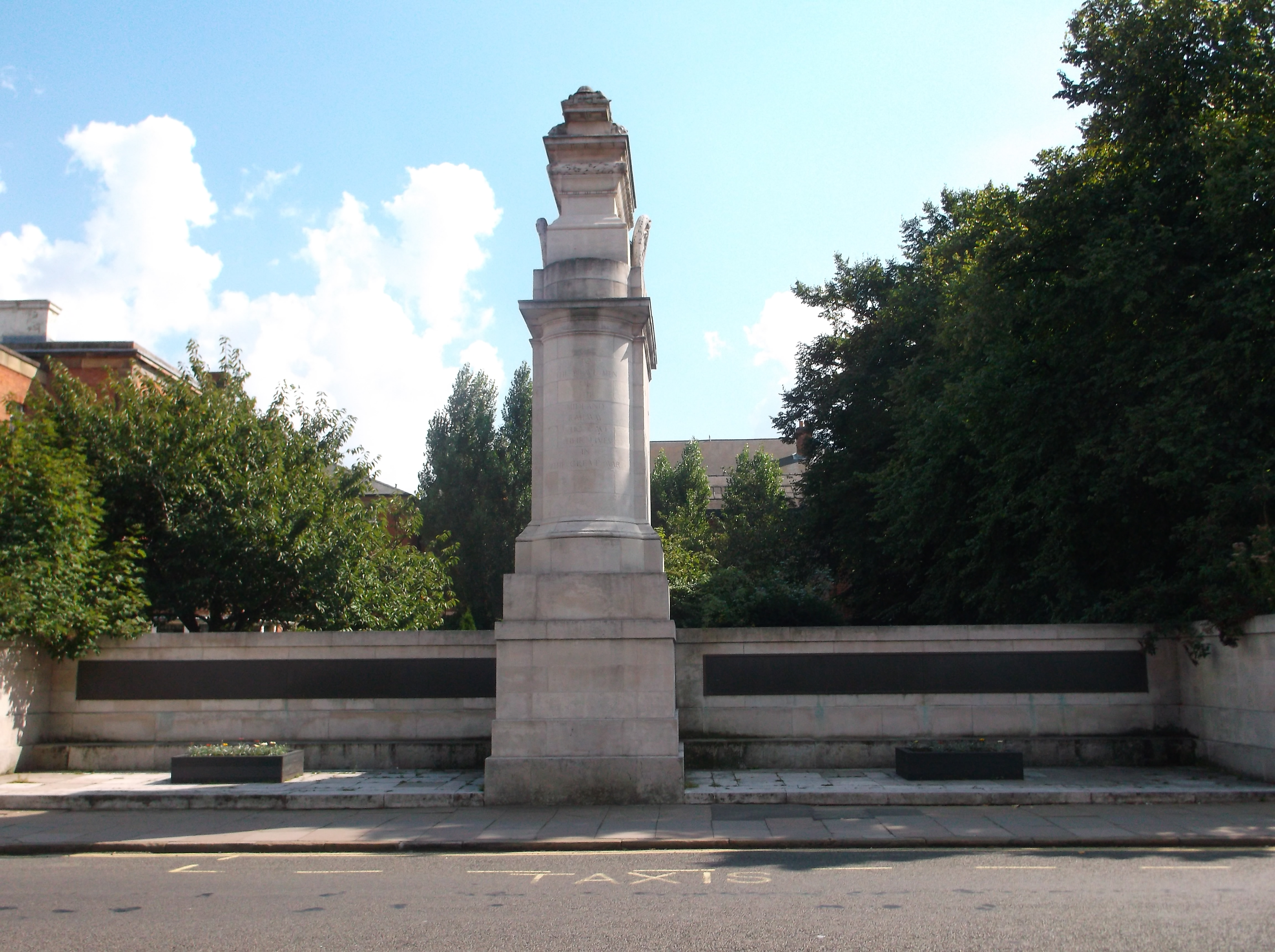
View from across Midland Road

London's Cenotaph was one of the most influential designs for First World War memorials; cenotaphs, many based to a greater or lesser degree on Lutyens' design, became a common form of war memorial in cities and large towns across Britain and the empire. Lutyens designed several others himself, including the Midland Railway's. They are among the most ambitious of his war memorial designs. Most are based heavily on Whitehall's, though with considerable variation between them.

== Design ==
The memorial stands on Midland Road, within sight of Midland station and adjacent to the Midland Hotel, encroaching onto the hotel's garden. Of Portland stone construction, the memorial consists of a 10 m (32 ft 10 in) high cenotaph with rounded sides in the centre of a 2 m (6 ft 7 in) high screen wall. At the top of the cenotaph is a recumbent effigy of an unknown soldier, partially covered by his greatcoat and with his Brodie helmet and bayonet at his feet. The soldier lies on a catafalque, beneath which is a sculpture of a lion's head at each of the four corners.

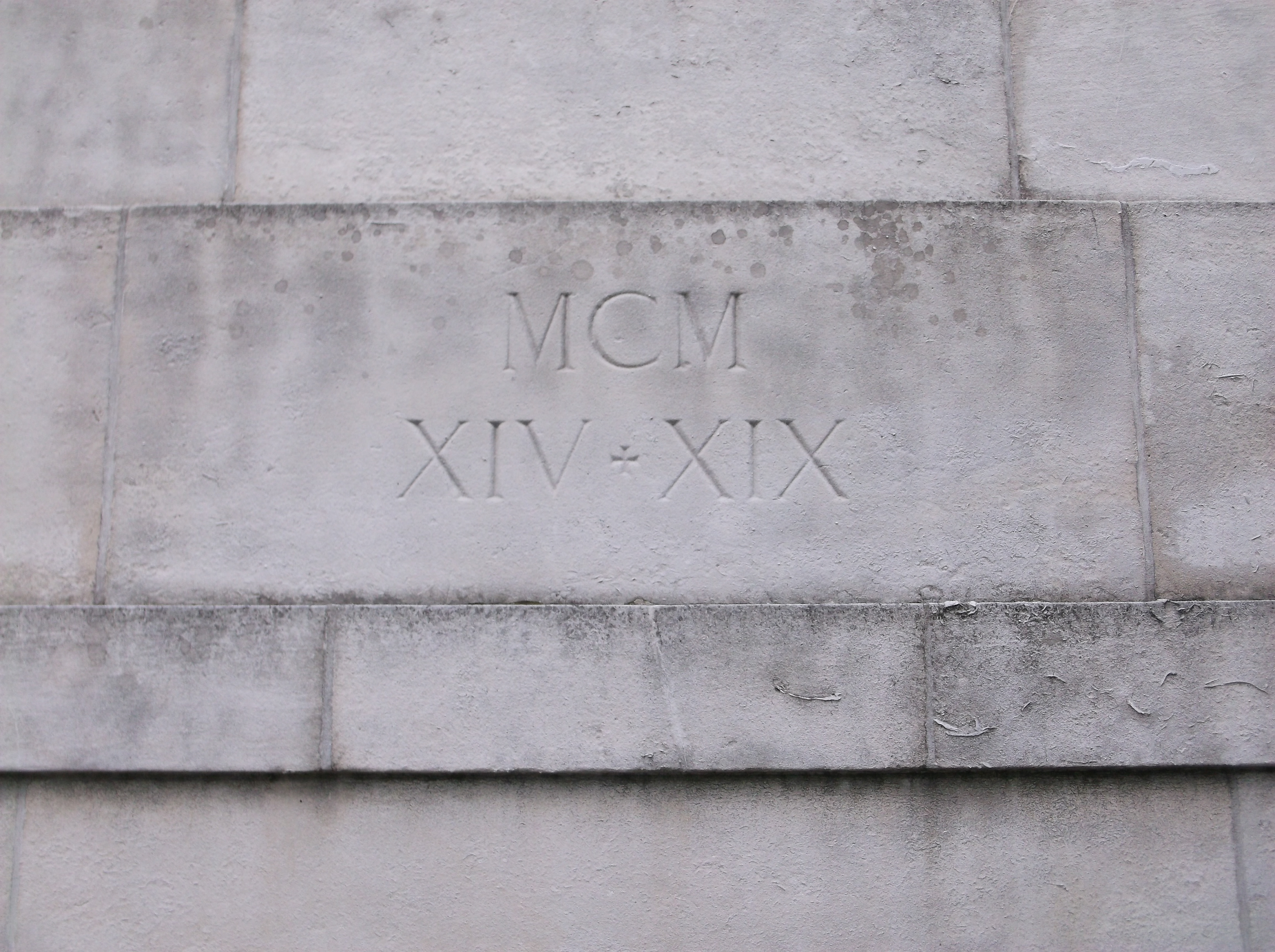

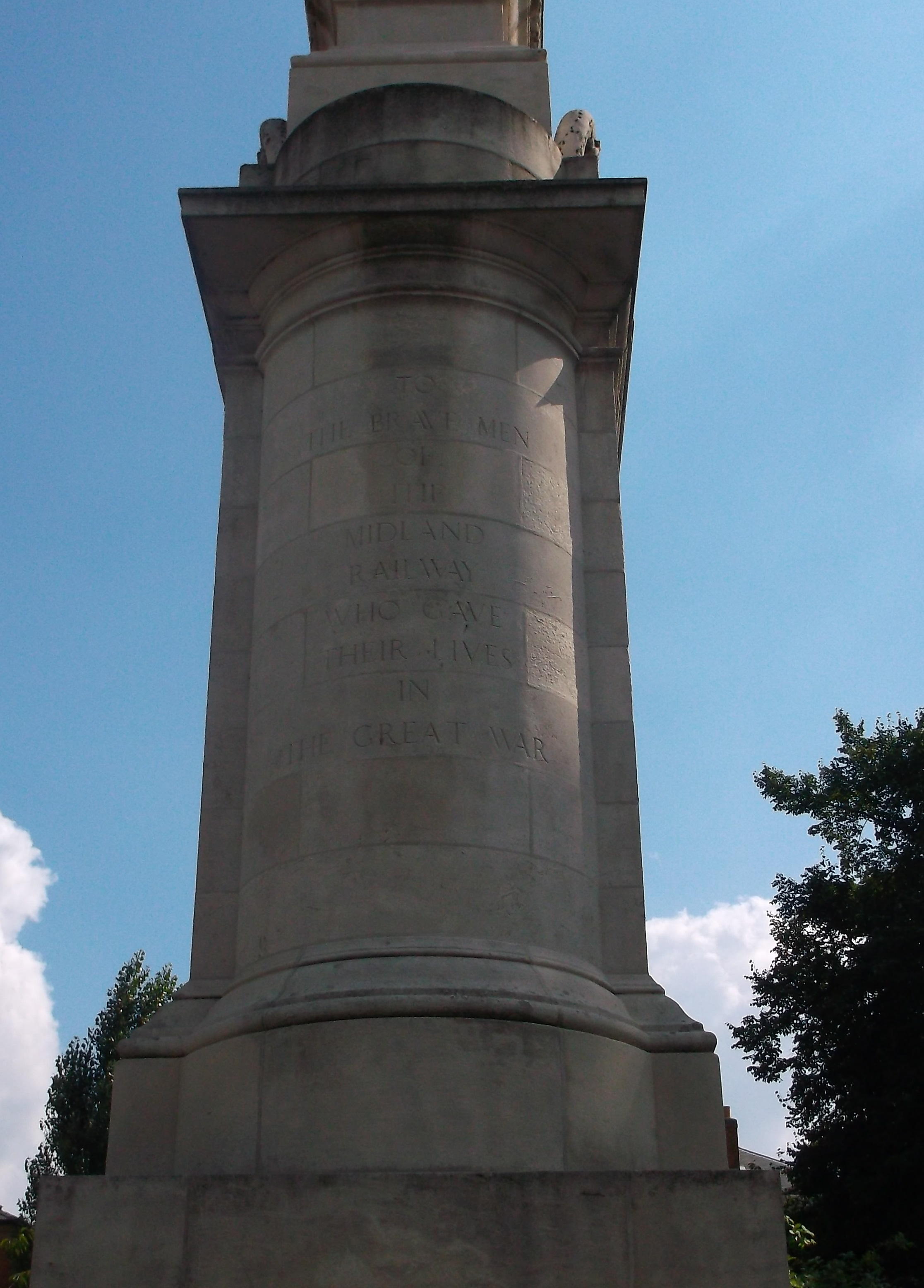

Further down is a carving of the Midland Railway's coat of arms on two sides, which is enclosed in a laurel wreath. The front of the cenotaph (facing Midland Road) is inscribed: TO THE BRAVE MEN OF THE MIDLAND RAILWAY WHO GAVE THEIR LIVES IN THE GREAT WAR. The two sides are inscribed with the dates of the First World War in Roman numerals: MCMXIV † XIX (1914–19). Although generally described as such, the memorial is not strictly a cenotaph as the sculpture at the top is a human figure rather than an empty tomb.

The screen wall forms rectangular alcoves on each side of the cenotaph, 7 m (23 ft) by 3 m (9 ft 10 in) deep. The names of the dead were originally carved into the stone but are now embossed on bronze plaques due to erosion. A small step allows children to view the names of the fallen close-up. The names are listed in alphabetical order with no indication of military rank or branch of service. At the ends of the screen wall are solid squares, each supporting a flagpole. The design for the cenotaph became the model for Rochdale Cenotaph, which was unveiled a year after the Midland's.

Historic England describes the memorial as "an eloquent witness to the tragic impacts of world events on this company and the sacrifices made by its staff in the First World War". Historian Ana Carden-Coyne described it as a "simple yet solemn memorial". The design uses shapes reminiscent of classical architecture, which Lutyens (influenced by his own pantheism and his association with Theosophy) preferred for its "abstract shape and intrinsic beauty", over explicitly religious symbolism such as a Christian cross. The recumbent soldier's position at the top of the pylon rather than at eye level is reminiscent of ancient tower tombs. His position high above eye level gives him anonymity, enhanced by the greatcoat covering his face, allowing the onlooker to believe he could be somebody they personally mourned. His position draws attention to the details on the pylon by making the viewer look up, allowing them to focus on the aesthetics of the structure rather than the violent manner of the soldier's death, giving idealised sense of heroism and self-sacrifice or "beautiful death" which Lutyens was keen to portray—with rare exceptions, the violent manner of a soldier's death was not generally considered an appropriate subject for sculpture in First World War memorials.

== History ==
The memorial was built by J Parnell and Son Ltd and cost £10,309 (1921). Charles Booth, company chairman of the Midland Railway, unveiled the memorial on 15 December 1921 while the Right Reverend Edwyn Hoskyns, Bishop of Southwell and Nottingham, gave a dedication. The Midland did not invite the families of the dead to the ceremony, fearing that there would be insufficient space for them, but offered free travel passes to Derby for relatives wishing to visit the memorial after its unveiling.

As well as the monument, the Midland Railway published a book of remembrance, a copy of which was sent to the family of each of the men listed on the memorial. The book contained a photograph of the memorial, along with details about each man's occupation within the company, their home depot or station, regiment, and military rank. In the foreword, the Midland's general manager, Frank Tatlow, described the memorial as expressing:

... the triumphant end of the war, as well as the sadness and sorrow it entailed, and is intended to embody the whole meaning of those troubled years which have bequeathed to us the memory of so many good lives lost and stout hearts which no longer beat. It marks the victory which crowned their whole efforts, and the pride with which the Midland Company can truly affirm 'our men did not a little to that end.'

The Midland and other British railway companies struggled to recover from the effects of the war. As a result, the Midland was amalgamated with its rival the London and North Western Railway (LNWR) and several smaller railways in the Railways Act 1921 to form the London, Midland and Scottish Railway (LMS), whose casualties from the Second World War are commemorated on the LNWR's war memorial outside Euston station in London. Both memorials are now the responsibility of Network Rail, which inherited them from British Rail (itself created by nationalisation of the LMS and most other railways after the Second World War). The Midland had planned to build a second memorial at its London terminus, St Pancras, but the plans fell through due to lack of funds. The artist Fabian Peake created a memorial there in 2018, unveiled on the centenary of the Armistice (11 November), inspired by job titles he found in the Midland's Book of Remembrance. A copy of the book of remembrance is held by the National Railway Museum.

The memorial was designated a grade II* listed building on 24 February 1977. Listed building status offers statutory protection from demolition or modification; grade II* is reserved for "particularly important buildings of more than special interest" and is applied to about 5.5 per cent of listings. In November 2015, as part of commemorations for the centenary of the First World War, Historic England recognised the Midland Railway War Memorial as part of a national collection of Lutyens' war memorials. The war memorial forms part of Derby's Railway Conservation Area, a collection of buildings around the railway station associated with the Midland Railway. Designated by Derby City Council, the conservation area recognises the historic interest of the area and imposes controls on development.

The memorial was damaged in 2010 when several of the bronze plaques, listing the names of the dead, were ripped from the walls. Some were quickly discovered; others, apparently stolen for the scrap value of the metal, were recovered later. Two men responsible for the theft received prison sentences. The plaques were restored by Network Rail and the Railway Heritage Trust at a cost of £18,000, and a service of re-dedication took place on 17 December 2010 using the original prayer of dedication from the 1921 service, read by the Reverend James Lindsay. The theft prompted an initiative to treat the metal elements of all Derbyshire war memorials with SmartWater, a product which allows metal to be identified under ultraviolet light.

In August 2022 a car crashed into the memorial after a police chase.

== See also ==
- Derby War Memorial, the town's war memorial, in the Market Place
- The Arch of Remembrance, another Lutyens war memorial, in nearby Leicester

Other railway war memorials:

- Great Eastern Railway War Memorial
- Great Western Railway War Memorial
- London, Brighton and South Coast Railway War Memorial
- London and North Western Railway War Memorial
- North Eastern Railway War Memorial (also by Lutyens)

Other listed buildings:

- Grade II* listed buildings in Derby
- Grade II* listed war memorials in England
- Listed buildings in Derby (Arboretum Ward)
