= Ysgol Treffynnon =

Location
- Pen-y-Maes Road; Holywell, Flintshire, CH8 7EN; Wales
- Coordinates: 53.27732°N 3.21753°W

Information
- Former names: Holywell High School / Holywell Grammar School
- Type: Community secondary school
- Motto: Inspire, Challenge, Succeed
- Local authority: Flintshire County Council
- Department for Education URN: 401702 Tables
- Head teacher: John Weir
- Teaching staff: 27.9 (on an FTE basis)
- Gender: Mixed
- Age range: 11–16
- Enrolment: 441 (2018)
- Student to teacher ratio: 15.8
- Language: English
- Website: www.ysgoltreffynnon.cymru

Ysgol Treffynnon (formerly Holywell High School) is an 11–16 mixed, English-medium, community secondary school in Holywell, Flintshire, Wales. Previously it was Holywell Grammar School.

There were 2 buildings which made up the school; Lower and Upper. The Lower building catered for 11-13 year olds and the Upper building for 14-18 year olds and included the Sixth Form. The upper building was demolished in the mid-1990s to make way for a new housing development and the Lower building was remodelled to accommodate the whole school into one building.

A proposed replacement high school was approved May, 2014. The new 600 place school was built on the upper grounds close to the existing building and was formally opened in September 2016. The old school building was demolished in November 2016.
