= Holywell Town railway station =

Former railway station in Flintshire, Wales

Holywell Town
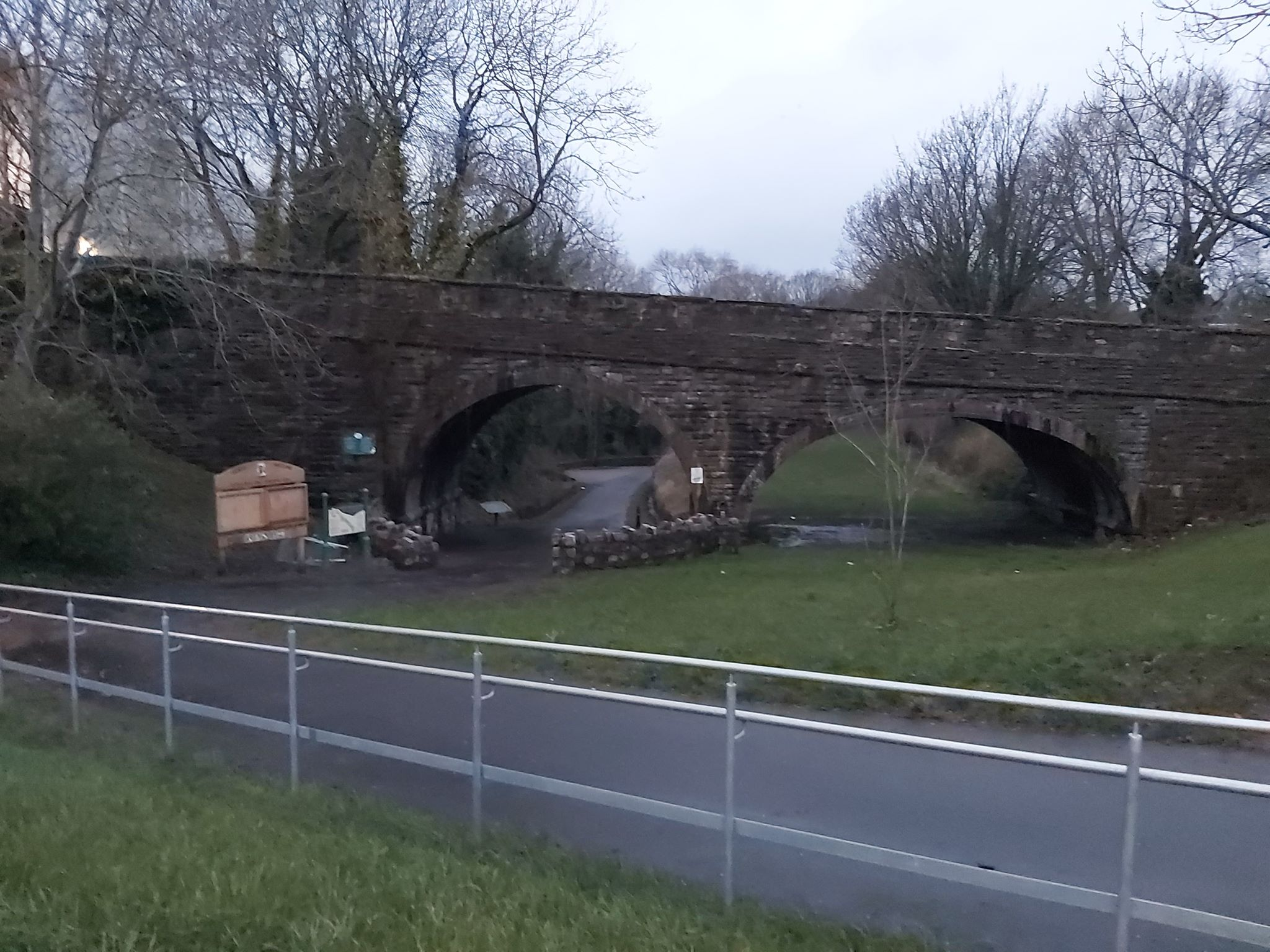
- Site of Holywell Town station in 2020

General information
- Location: Holywell, Flintshire; Wales
- Coordinates: 53.2748°N 3.2204°W
- Grid reference: SJ186760
- Platforms: 1

Other information
- Status: Disused

History
- Original company: London and North Western Railway
- Pre-grouping: London and North Western Railway
- Post-grouping: London, Midland and Scottish Railway

Key dates
- 1 July 1912: Opened
- 6 September 1954: Closed
Location

Holywell Town railway station served the market town of Holywell, in Flintshire, Wales. It was the southern terminus of the Holywell branch line, which linked the town centre with the North Wales Main Line at Holywell Junction.

== History ==
The station was opened on 1 July 1912 and closed on 6 September 1954. There was a single platform with two wooden shelters, a run round loop and extensive goods facilities. The station could be accessed by a sloping path down from a road bridge.

== Service ==
The passenger rolling stock consisted of two former picnic saloons, converted to form an auto-train. (Note: An auto train consisted of a small steam locomotive and a passenger coach with controls capable of operating the locomotive's own controls. When the driving trailer was leading, the driver operated the locomotive from a driving position in the coach.)

At first, there were sixteen passenger train journeys each way on weekdays; this was increased to 29 each way before 1939. The summer 1938 Bradshaw shows 26 Monday to Friday departures up the branch, from 06:25 to 23:30. A similar number ran on Saturdays.

Preceding station	Disused railways	Following station
St Winefride's Halt; Line and station closed	London and North Western Railway; Holywell Branch Line	Terminus

== The site today ==
After closure, the station building and platform were demolished. The bridge over the site is extant, with the elevated goods yard site on the north-west side of the road. A staircase provides access from the Tesco supermarket car park.

The site is now the southern end of the Greenfield Valley, which is a tarmacked footpath that follows the length of the former branch line.
