= St. Marys Junction station =

Railway station in St. Marys, Canada

St. Marys Junction
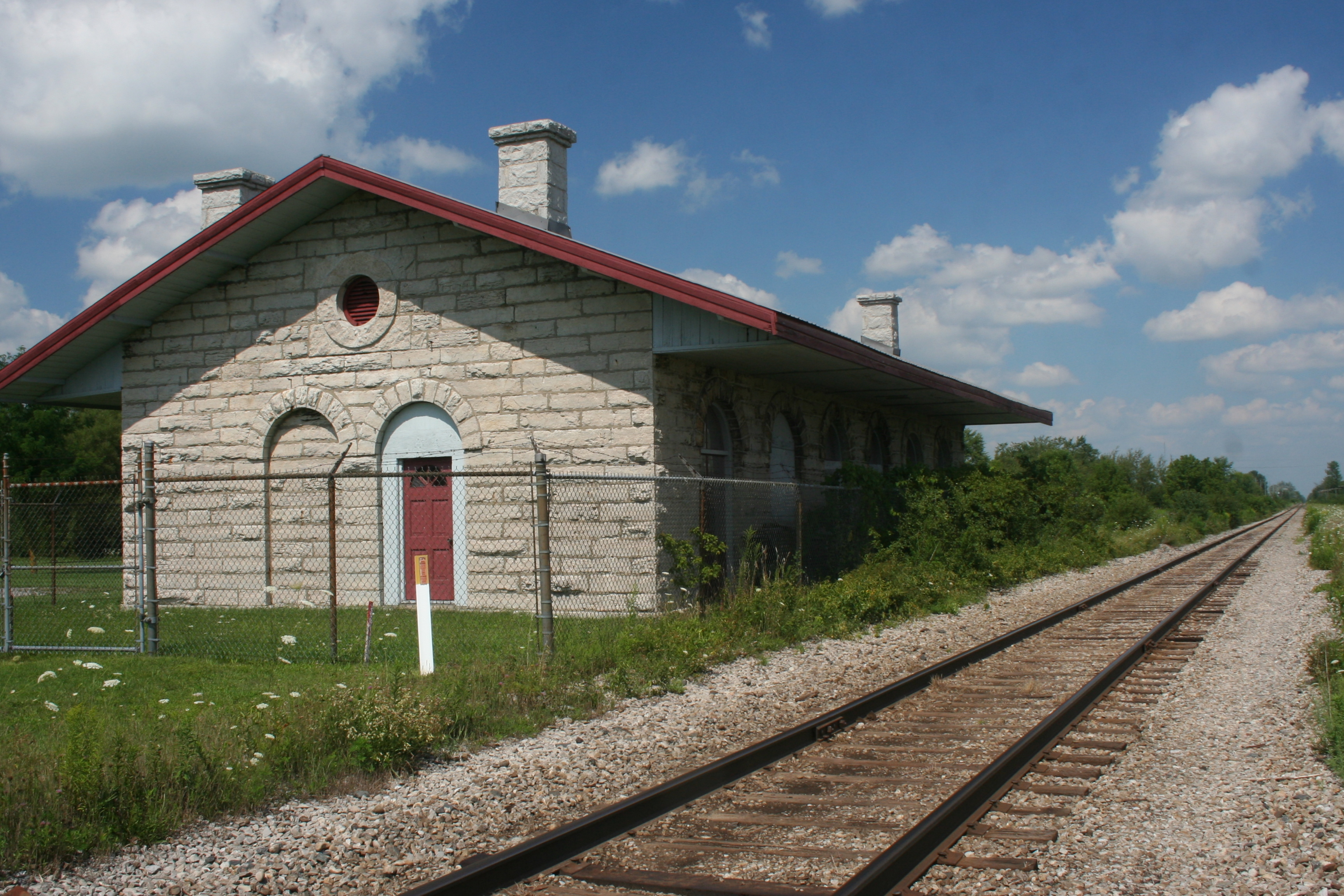

General information
- Location: 480 Glass St, St. Marys, Ontario; Canada
- Coordinates: 43°16′18.3″N 81°07′52.4″W
- Platforms: None
- Tracks: 1

Construction
- Architect: Francis Thompson

History
- Opened: 1858
- Closed: 1941

Former services
Preceding station	Canadian National Railway	Following station
Granton toward Sarnia	Sarnia – Toronto via Lucan Crossing	St. Pauls toward Toronto
St. Marys toward London	London – Stratford	St. Pauls toward Stratford
Location

St. Marys Junction station was a Grand Trunk Railway station located one kilometre north of St. Marys, Ontario. It operated as a train station from 1858 until 1941, and remained in service for non-passenger functions until the 1970s. It is now home to a microbrewery.

The railway junction itself no longer exists as the former Grand Trunk railway directly from St. Marys to Sarnia has been abandoned. All trains from St. Marys to Sarnia travel instead along the route to London, and the former Great Western Railway from London to Sarnia. A water tower on opposite side of tracks was later removed. The one sided platform was removed and grassed over.

The station was initially fenced off with doors and windows boarded up. Windows and doors have since been restored with only track side fenced off. Since December 2020 the station is home to an independent micro brewery Broken Rail Brewing. Minimum changes were made to exterior with upgrades to interior to support the functioning brewing operations.

== Structure ==
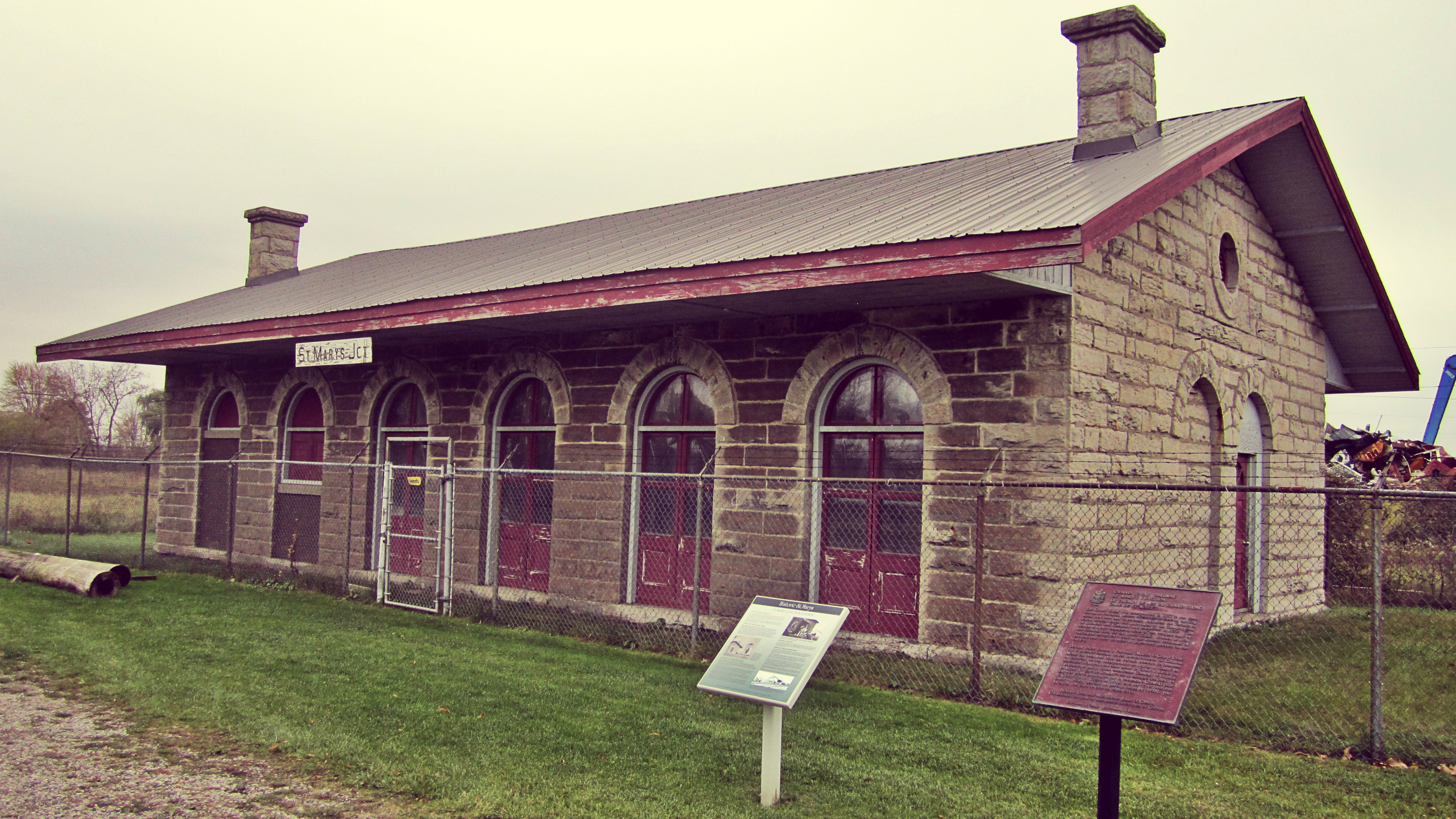
The station building in 2017

The station building was designed according to the standard Grand Trunk Railway 'A First Class Way Side Station' plan developed by British architect Francis Thompson.

The passenger facilities consisted of a ticket area, a luggage room and separate 'ladies' and 'gentlemen' waiting rooms.

== History ==
St. Marys station opened in 1858 as the western terminus of the Grand Trunk Railway line from Toronto, located fully outside the town of St Marys. The Town of St. Marys opposed the selection of such a remote station location, instead recommending a location near the town centre.

The Grand Trunk Railway was extended west to Sarnia in 1859 and south to London in 1860, with the two branches meeting at St. Marys station. As a result, St. Marys station became St. Marys Junction and the station building became the control point for the switches at the rail junction.

In 1879, St. Marys Town GTR station opened within the town on the branch toward London, providing a more convenient access to the town centre than St. Marys Junction station. The passenger function of St. Marys Junction was further diminished when St. Marys Town station was replaced by the current St. Marys station in 1907.

The station was closed in 1941, but the building continued to be used for non-passenger purposes until the 1970s.

== See also ==
- St. Marys railway station (Ontario)
