= Flint railway station =

Railway station in Flintshire, Wales

Flint Welsh: Y Fflint
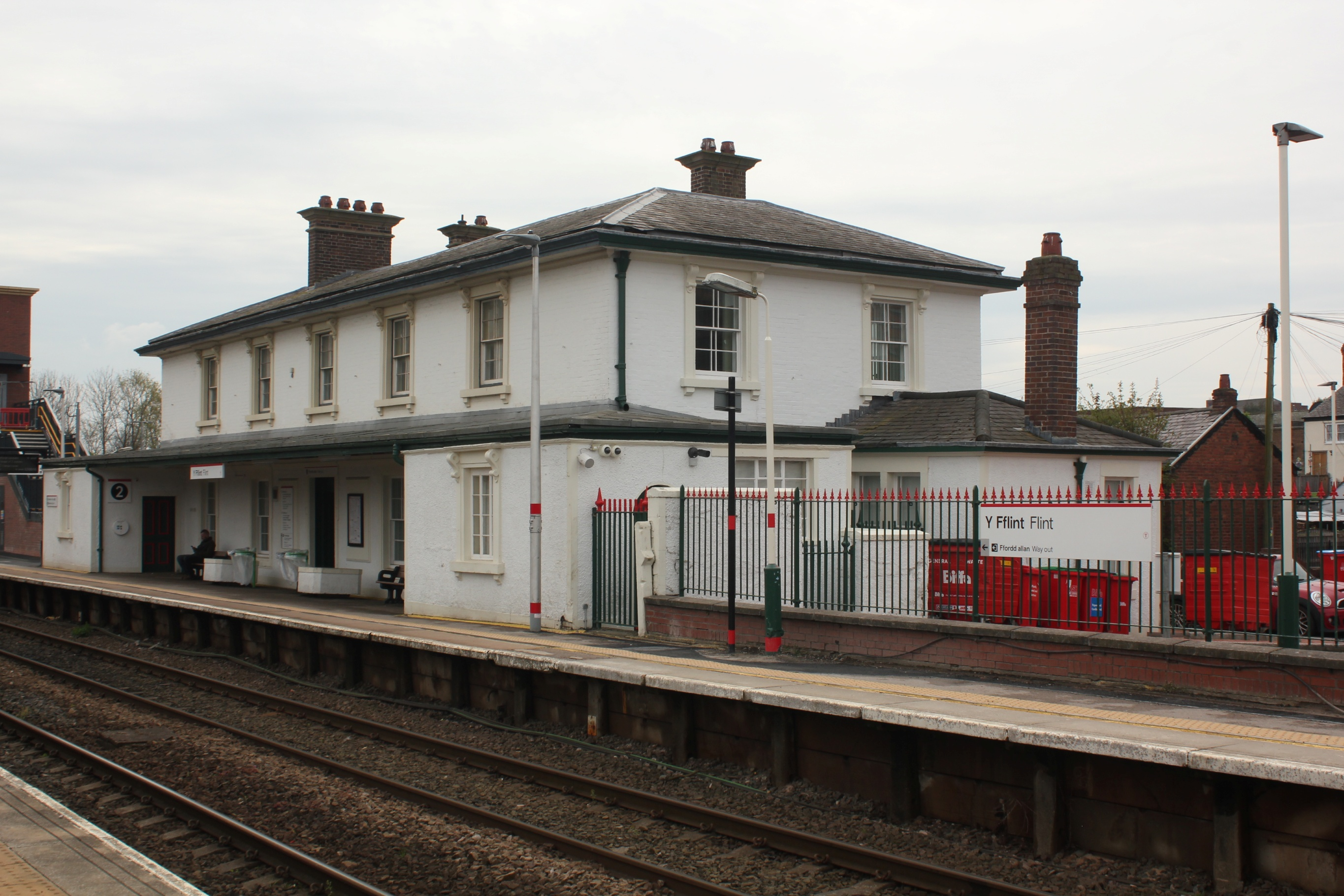
- The main building at Flint station in 2025

General information
- Location: Flint, Flintshire; Wales
- Coordinates: 53.250°N 3.133°W
- Grid reference: SJ245731
- Manager: Transport for Wales
- Platforms: 2

Other information
- Station code: FLN
- Classification: DfT category E

History
- Opened: 1 May 1848

Passengers
- 2020/21: ▼60,392
- 2021/22: ▲0.188 million
- 2022/23: ▲0.234 million
- 2023/24: ▲0.299 million
- 2024/25: ▲0.334 million

Listed Building – Grade II
- Feature: Flint railway station
- Designated: 18 July 1990
- Reference no.: 581
Location
Notes
- Passenger statistics from the Office of Rail and Road

Flint railway station (Welsh: Y Fflint) serves the town of Flint in Flintshire, North Wales. It is located on the North Wales Coast Line and is managed by Transport for Wales, which provides most of the passenger trains that call here; some Avanti West Coast services also serve the station. In July 2008, it was voted UK Station of the Year.

== History ==
The station was opened on 1 May 1848.

The facilities at the station were expanded and opened on 14 May 1979, including a new park & ride facility, a platform extension and a new public address system.

== Facilities ==
The station is staffed through the day, with the ticket office inside the main building on platform 2. A self-service ticket machine is provided for use and for collecting advance purchase tickets. A waiting room is provided on the eastbound side (platform 1), with digital information screens, timetable posters and help points on both platforms. A stepped footbridge connects the two platforms, but step-free access to both sides is provided via a public footpath passing beneath the railway.

In 2024, it was announced that the station would install a new footbridge and lift with funding coming from the Department for Transport's Access for All programme. The lifts were opened in October 2025, alongside changes to the car park "to ensure accessible spaces close to the drop-off point".

== Services ==
Flint is served by two train operating companies:

- Transport for Wales operates generally hourly services on two main routes:
  - Manchester Airport to Llandudno; some trains run through to/from Holyhead
  - Birmingham International or Cardiff Central (alternate hours) to Holyhead.
- Avanti West Coast operates inter-city services between Holyhead and London Euston, via Chester and Crewe. There are five services in each direction on weekdays.

Preceding station	National Rail	Following station
Shotton	Transport for Wales; North Wales Coast Line	Prestatyn
Chester	Transport for Wales; Premier Service	Rhyl
Chester	Avanti West Coast; West Coast Main Line-Holyhead-Bangor–London Euston	Prestatyn

== Bibliography ==
- Mitchell, Vic; Smith, Keith (2011). Chester to Rhyl. West Sussex: Middleton Press. figs. 44-48. ISBN 9781906008932. OCLC 795178960.
- Quick, Michael (2023). Railway Passenger Stations in Great Britain: A Chronology (PDF) (5th ed.). London: Railway and Canal Historical Society.
