= North Wales Main Line =

Railway line in north Wales

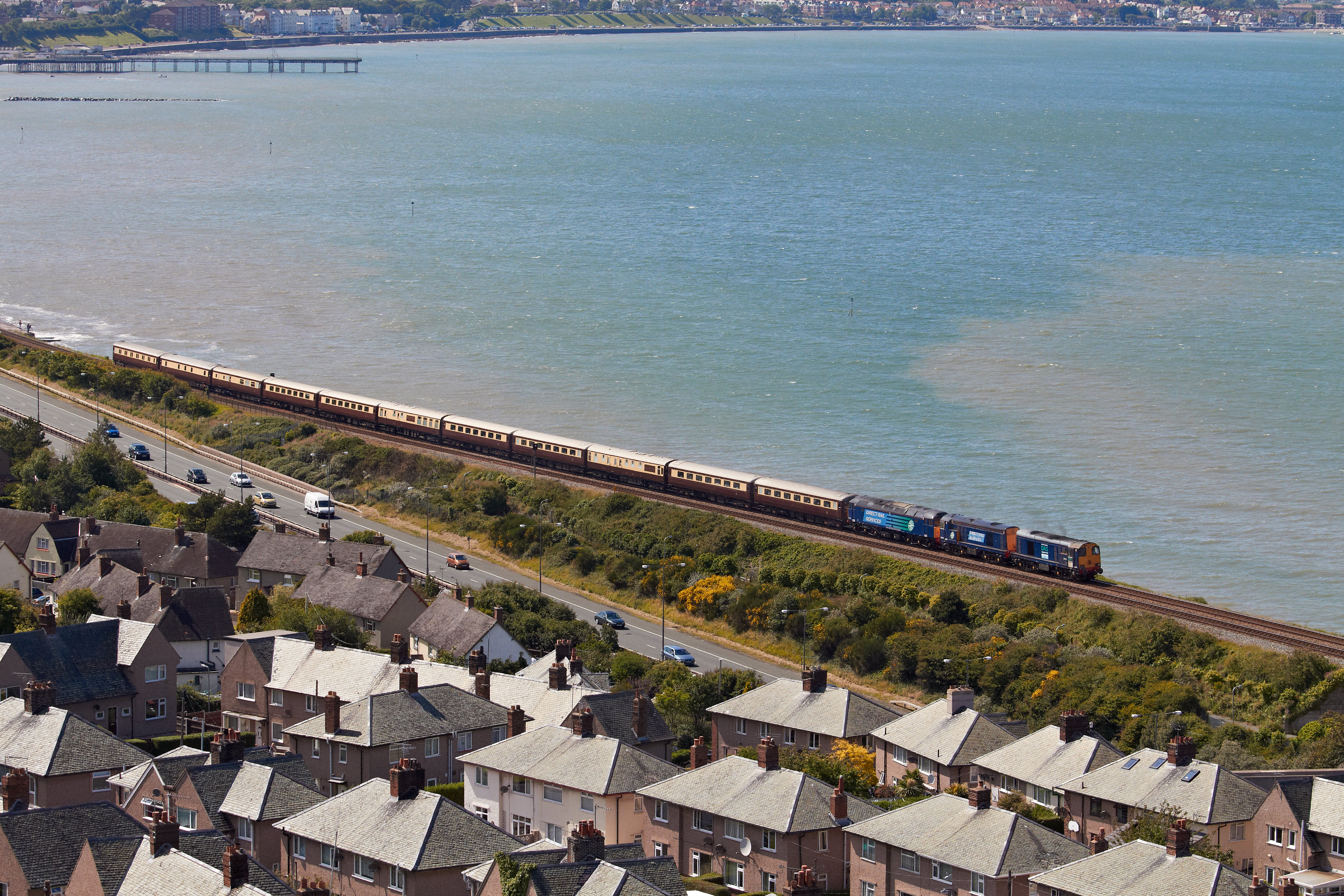
- North Wales Coast Line in Colwyn Bay along the Irish Sea

Overview
- Other names: North Wales Coast Line; Holyhead–Crewe line
- Native name: Llinell Arfordir Gogledd Cymru; Rheilffordd Arfordir Gogledd Cymru; Prif Linell Gogledd Cymru; Prif Linell y Gogledd; Rheilffordd Cryw a Chaergybi
- Owner: Network Rail
- Locale: Anglesey; Gwynedd; Conwy County Borough; Denbighshire; Flintshire; Cheshire
- Termini: Crewe; Holyhead
- Stations: 19

Service
- Type: Heavy rail
- System: National Rail
- Operators: Avanti West Coast; Transport for Wales Rail
- Rolling stock: Class 67; Class 150 "Sprinter"; Class 153 "Super Sprinter"; Class 158 "Express Sprinter"; Class 197 "Civity"; Class 805 "Evero"

History
- Opened: 1850

Technical
- Line length: 105.5 miles (169.8 km)
- Number of tracks: Double track mostly (except on the Britannia Bridge where there is single track)
- Character: Mainly coastal
- Track gauge: 4 ft 8 1/2 in (1,435 mm) standard gauge
- Operating speed: 90 mph (145 km/h)
Route map
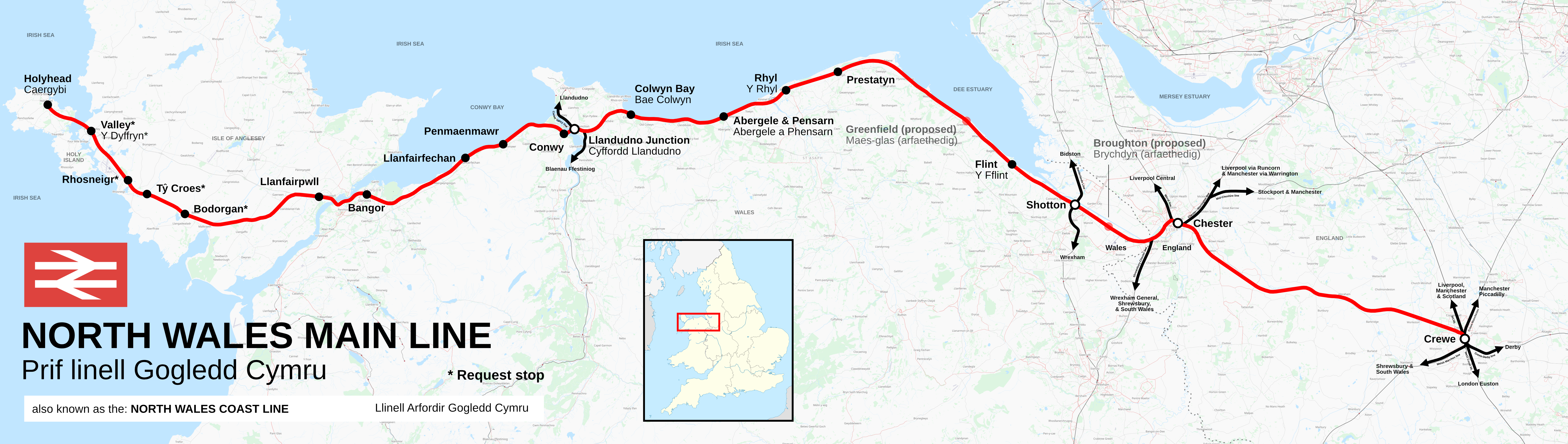

The North Wales Main Line (Welsh: Prif Linell Gogledd Cymru or Prif Linell y Gogledd; lit. 'north main line'), also known as the North Wales Coast Line (Welsh: Llinell Arfordir Gogledd Cymru), is a major railway line in the north of Wales and Cheshire, England, running from Crewe on the West Coast Main Line to Holyhead on the Isle of Anglesey. The line has 19 stations, with all except two, Chester and Crewe, being in Wales.

The line is not currently electrified, so Avanti West Coast, the current operator of the West Coast Partnership franchise, currently uses Class 805 Evero units. Class 221 Super Voyagers were previously used from December 2007 to December 2024. Plans to electrify the line were announced in October 2023.

The line contains several notable engineering structures, including Conwy railway bridge across the River Conwy, and Britannia Bridge across the Menai Strait.

== History ==
The first section, from Crewe to Chester, was built by the Chester and Crewe Railway and absorbed by the Grand Junction Railway shortly before opening in 1840. The remainder was built between 1844 and 1850 by the Chester and Holyhead Railway Company as the route of the Irish Mail services to Dublin. The line was later incorporated into the London and North Western Railway. Between Chester and Saltney Junction, the line was, from the start, used by trains of the Shrewsbury and Chester Railway, later to be incorporated into the Great Western Railway.

So important was the line in the 19th and early 20th centuries to passenger, mail and freight traffic between Britain and Ireland that the world's first experimental and operational water troughs were installed at Mochdre, between Colwyn Bay and Llandudno Junction. Their purpose was to enable steam engines (especially on the Irish Mail) to collect water without stopping. Later, considerable stretches of line between Chester and Colwyn Bay were quadrupled to increase line capacity, but these sections have now been reduced to two tracks.

=== Modern day ===
In 2018, a £50 million signalling upgrade programme was completed between Shotton and Colwyn Bay. This upgrade saw modular colour lights supervised from the South Wales Rail Operating Centre in Cardiff replacing the manual signal boxes and mixture of semaphore and older colour lights.

== Main calling points ==
The places served by the route are as follows:

- Crewe
- Chester
  - Wirral line diverges to serve Birkenhead and Liverpool (Merseyrail)
  - Line diverges to serve Wrexham, Shrewsbury and Cardiff (via the Shrewsbury to Chester Line), and Manchester, Warrington and Runcorn (via the Mid-Cheshire line and Chester–Warrington line).
- Shotton
  - The Borderlands Line connecting Wrexham to Bidston crosses at Shotton with interchange facilities.
- Flint
- Prestatyn
- Rhyl
- Abergele
- Colwyn Bay
- Llandudno Junction
  - Lines diverge to serve Blaenau Ffestiniog and Llandudno (via the Conwy Valley Line)
- Conwy
- Penmaenmawr
- Llanfairfechan
- Bangor
- Llanfairpwll
  - Line diverges to Amlwch (Anglesey Central Railway, disused)
- Bodorgan
- Ty Croes
- Rhosneigr
- Valley
  - Freight from Wylfa nuclear power station is loaded at a depot in Valley
- Holyhead

== Services ==
The principal through passenger services are London Euston to Holyhead, Bangor, Chester and Wrexham General, operated by Avanti West Coast; and Crewe to Holyhead, Cardiff to Holyhead, and Manchester to Llandudno, currently operated by Transport for Wales Rail. A revised timetable has operated since December 2005 incorporating a new service to and from Cardiff Central every two hours. The line still provides the UK railway part of the through passenger service to Dublin using fast car ferries from Holyhead to Dublin Port.

== Future ==
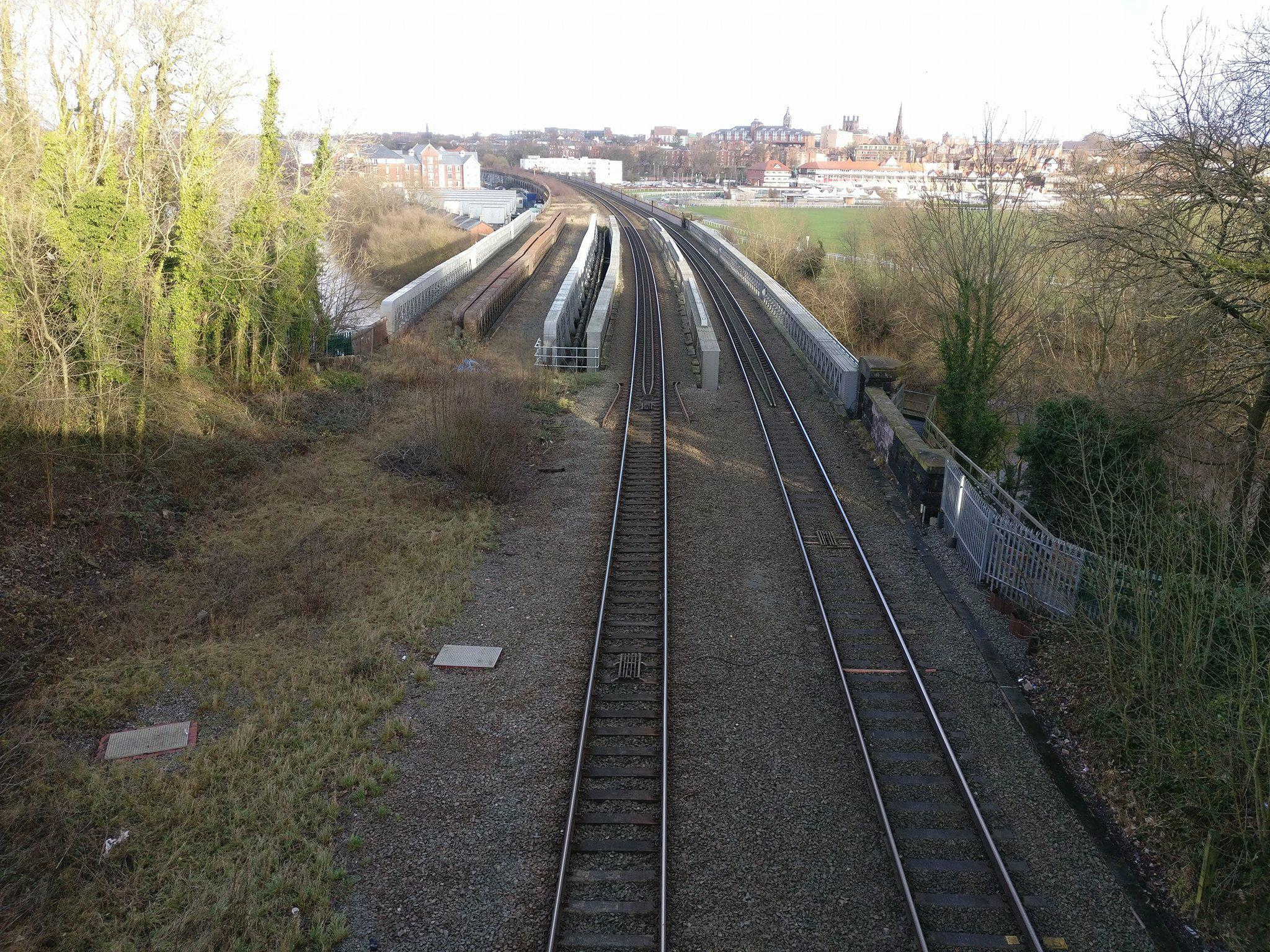
North Wales Coast Line between Chester and Saltney, showing the two tracks over the River Dee. The path of the other two tracks which were removed can also be seen.

The Welsh Government would like the line to be electrified. Chancellor George Osborne said in July 2015 that there was a "really strong case" for electrification of the line. The Electrification Task Force said that the Chester-to-Crewe line was a Tier 2 priority for being electrified in the CP6 period (2019–2024).

In 2023, Prime Minister Rishi Sunak announced that electrification of the North Wales Coast line would receive £1 billion in funding as part of the Network North policy paper, in conjunction with the scrapping of High Speed 2 north of Birmingham.

=== New trains ===
Class 221 units previously operated long-distance services to Holyhead from London Euston for Avanti West Coast. They were replaced by Class 805 Evero units in June 2024. These new units are able to run using the overhead wires from Euston to Crewe, before switching to diesel power from Crewe to Holyhead.

Transport for Wales Rail operate regional services using Class 158 units. These were replaced from 2022 onwards by Class 197 units.

=== Proposed stations ===
There are three proposed railway stations on the line. Two stations, proposed as part of the North Wales Metro, are both in Flintshire: at Greenfield and Broughton. Cheshire East Council have also proposed a station at Leighton, on the outskirts of Crewe.
