= St James' Church, Derby =

St James' The Greater's Church, Derby
- St James' The Greater's Church, Derby
- Location within Derbyshire
- 52°54′29.6″N 1°28′10.1″W
- Location: Derby, Derbyshire
- Country: England
- Denomination: Church of England

History
- Dedication: St James the Greater
- Consecrated: 27 December 1866

Architecture
- Heritage designation: Grade II listed
- Architect: Joseph Peacock
- Groundbreaking: 18 June 1866

Administration
- Diocese: Diocese of Derby
- Archdeaconry: Derby
- Deanery: Derby South
- Parish: Walbrook Epiphany

St James The Greater's Church, Derby is a Church of England parish church in Derby, Derbyshire.

== History ==
The church is situated in Malcolm Street, Normanton, Derby, DE23 8LS.

The corner stone was laid on 18 June 1866 by the Archdeacon of Derby, Ven. Thomas Hill. The architect was Joseph Peacock of Bloomsbury Square, London and the contractor was William Huddlestone of Lincoln. Construction proceeded quickly and the church was consecrated by the Bishop of Lichfield on 27 December 1866 although the planned tower and spire had not been completed.

In 1996 the four parishes of St Thomas’, Derby, St Augustine's, Derby and St Chad's, Derby were united with St James as the new parish of Walbrook Epiphany. St James’ Church building is currently leased out as the Alter Rock climbing centre.

== Organ ==
An organ was installed by Brindley & Foster and used for the first time on Easter Sunday, 1874. A specification of the organ can be found on the National Pipe Organ Register. The organ has now been removed from the building.

=== Organists ===
- W.H. Orme ca. 1881
- Henry Jasper Boulderstone ????–1916
- Frederick J. Stevenson 1918–1944 (afterwards organist of St John the Evangelist's Church, Derby)

== See also ==
- Listed buildings in Derby (Arboretum Ward)
