= Listed buildings in Derby (Arboretum Ward) =

Arboretum is an electoral ward in the city of Derby, England. The ward contains over 150 listed buildings that are recorded in the National Heritage List for England. Of these, three are listed at Grade I, the highest of the three grades, 12 are at Grade II*, the middle grade, and the others are at Grade II, the lowest grade. The ward contains the centre of the city and an area to the south, including Rose Hill. Most of the listed buildings are houses and associated structures, shops, offices, public buildings, banks, public houses and hotels. In the area near the railway stations is accommodation built for railway workers, now listed, and to the south of the centre is Derby Arboretum, which contains a variety of listed buildings. The other listed buildings include Derby Cathedral, churches and associated structures, a former grammar school, a set of wrought iron gates by Robert Bakewell, bollards, a group of almshouses, a railway bridge, a market hall, a photographic studio, statues, a museum, a former theatre and war memorials.

== Key ==
Grade	Criteria
I	Buildings of exceptional interest, sometimes considered to be internationally important
II*	Particularly important buildings of more than special interest
II	Buildings of national importance and special interest

== Buildings ==
Name and location	Photograph	Date	Notes	Grade
St Peter's Church and walls 52.92043°N 1.47625°W		12th century	The church has been altered and extended through the centuries, there were restorations in 1851–53 by G. G Pace, and in 1859 by G. E. Street, further alterations in 1865 and 1898, and the church hall was added in 1970. The church consists of a nave with a clerestory, north and south aisles, a chancel, vestry and organ chamber, and a west tower. The tower has three stages, buttresses rising to pinnacles, a north pointed doorway, a four-light west window, and at the southwest a canted stair turret. Above, there are clock faces, two-light bell openings, and an embattled parapet with corner pinnacles. The parapets on the nave and chancel are embattled, and on the aisles they are coped. The east window is Perpendicular and has five lights. On the north and east sides of the church are boundary walls with gabled coping, and on the east side is a pair of square gate piers with octagonal pinnacles.	II*
Derby Cathedral; 52.92488°N 1.47736°W		1520–32	A parish church until 1927 when it was raised to the status of a cathedral. The oldest part of the cathedral is the tower, and the body of the church was rebuilt in about 1725 to a design by James Gibbs. There were later restorations, and the east end was extended in 1967–72. The church consists of a nave, north and south aisles, a chancel with chapels and an apse, and a west tower. The tower is Perpendicular in style and has three stages decorated with friezes and canopies. There are buttresses, a four-light west window, clock faces, and four-light bell-openings, above which is an embattled parapet with tall crocketed pinnacles. Along the body of the church are tall semicircular-headed windows, those on the aisles with Gibbs surrounds. Between the windows are paired Tuscan pilasters, and the top is balustraded.	I
The Old Dolphin public house 52.92530°N 1.47789°W		Late 16th to early 17th century	The public house on a corner site, which has been restored, has a timber framed core, the exterior has applied timber framing with rendering, and the roof is tiled. There are two storeys and attics, and an L-shaped plan, with a gable on each front. Entrance is through a former pedestrian passageway, and the windows are 20th-century casements.	II
St Werburgh's Church; 52.92328°N 1.48121°W		1601	The oldest part of the church is the tower, which was rebuilt following the collapse of an earlier tower. The body of the church was rebuilt in 1699 and there have been further alterations, including a north aisle in 1850 by H. I. Stevens, and major alterations between 1892 and 1894 by Arthur Blomfield, rebuilding the body of the church on a north-south axis. The church closed in 1984. It is built in stone, mainly gritstone with slate roofs, and consists of a south tower and chancel joined by arches to the nave that has a clerestory, the aisles, a transept, a porch and another chancel. The tower has three stages, angle buttresses, a west doorway and a two-light west window, clock faces, an embattled parapet, and corner pinnacles. The window at the liturgical west end has seven lights.	II*
Former Green Man Inn; 52.92018°N 1.47615°W		Early 17th century	The former public house is in red brick, with elaborate string courses and cornices. There are three storeys and a shaped gable with a pediment above. The windows are casements with mullions, those in the top floor with pediments, and the gable window has a cornice and a separate pediment above.	II*
Old Grammar School; 52.92031°N 1.47666°W		Early 17th century (probable)	The grammar school, later used for other purposes, is in stone. There is a single storey and attics, a tile roof, and two rendered gables. The building contains three four-light mullioned windows, and in each gable is a casement window.	II*
11 Friar Gate; 52.92345°N 1.48271°W		17th century	A public house later used for other purposes, it is timber framed with plaster infill, and has been much altered. There are two storeys and attics, and two gabled bays with bargeboards. In the ground floor is a modern shop front, the upper floor contains two-light windows, and in the attics are sashes.	II
16–17 Friar Gate; 52.92360°N 1.48341°W		17th century	The building is in brick with stone dressings, quoins, floor bands, and a tile roof. There are three storeys and attics, and eight bays, with a coped gable over each pair of bays. In the ground floor are modern shop fronts, In the upper floors the windows vary; most are sashes, some are top-hung casements, and in the attics are two-light mullioned windows.	II
114A–115 Friar Gate; 52.92317°N 1.48208°W		17th century	A pair of rendered shops that have a slate roof with coped gables. There are three storeys and two gabled bays. In the ground floor are modern shop fronts, and the upper floors contain mullioned and transomed windows.	II
22 Iron Gate; 52.92446°N 1.47792°W		17th century	The building has an earlier timber framed core, and the exterior is rendered. There are two storeys and attics, the upper storey jettied, and two bays, each gabled with plain bargeboards. In the ground floor is a shop front with a passage entrance to the left. The upper floor contains two three-light oriel windows, each having a fluted frieze with paterae, and a moulded cornice.	II
33 Wardwick; 52.92245°N 1.48013°W		17th century	The house on a corner site, which has been altered, is in red brick on a stone plinth, with painted stone dressings, quoins, and moulded string courses. There are three storeys and attics, and an L-shaped plan, consisting of two bays on the front, one on the right return, all gabled with moulded copings and ball finials, and a two-storey balustraded wing on the left. On the front, on the left return, and on the wing are two-storey canted bay windows with balustrades and ball finials. The doorway has a round arch, and a segmental pediment with a date in the tympanum, and in the wing is a broad former coach arch. The windows are mullioned, and some also have transoms.	II*
The Old Bell Hotel; 52.92337°N 1.47788°W		17th century	The hotel has a timber framed core, and has been much altered and extended. There are three storeys and attics, four gabled bays, and a later two-storey three-bay extension to the right. On the front is applied timber framing with brick and plaster infill, with added ornamental features including oriel windows.	II
County Hall; 52.92464°N 1.48065°W		1655–60	The building is in stone, it is approached by four steps, and has Tuscan columns in the corners, pilasters flanking the bays, a moulded eaves cornice, an open balustrade, and a hipped slate roof. There is a single storey and five bays, and the building is in Classical style. The middle and outer bays contain round-arched windows, and in the other bays are round-headed doorways each with an entablature, and a panel with a segmental pediment within an open scrolled pediment.	I
48 Sadler Gate; 52.92321°N 1.47847°W		1675	A shop in red brick with painted stone dressings, a moulded cornice between the top two floors and at the eaves, and a stone-capped brick parapet. There are three storeys and four bays. In the ground floor is a shop front, and to the right is a round-headed doorway with pilasters, a pulvinated frieze, a cornice, and a segmental pediment with the date in the tympanum. The windows in the middle floor are sashes, and in the top floor they are mullioned and transomed.	II*
51 Sadler Gate; 52.92328°N 1.47819°W		Late 17th century	A shop in painted brick with a cornice over each floor and a shallow parapet. There are three storeys and two bays. In the ground floor is a modern shop front, and the upper floors have sash windows. There are the remains of a shaped gable with a blocked mullioned and transomed window within it.	II
27–28 Queen Street; 52.92604°N 1.47878°W		Late 17th century	A house, later altered, refronted and used for other purposes, it is in red brick with stone dressings, and a hipped slate roof. There are two storeys, an L-shaped plan, and a front range of five bays. The outer bays contain round-arched doorways with rendered surrounds, between them are three windows, and above is a modillion cornice. In the centre of the upper floor is a projecting turret clock, and the other bays contain sash windows. Above these is another modillion cornice, forming a semicircular broken pediment over the middle bay. At the rear are two projections, one with two storeys and the other with three.	II
41–47 Wardwick; 52.92255°N 1.48045°W		Late 17th or early 18th century	A stuccoed shop on a corner site, with rusticated quoins, a moulded cornice, and a tile roof with a stone coped gable and a ball finial. There are two storeys and seven bays. In the ground floor are modern shop fronts, and the upper floors contain sash windows with eared architraves and moulded keystones.	II
Former Wardwick Tavern; 52.92224°N 1.47947°W		1708	The public house is in red brick with stone dressings, a moulded eaves cornice, and a coped brick parapet. There are three storeys and seven bays. In the centre is a doorway with an architrave and a segmental pediment on moulded brackets, and to the right is a square-headed carriage entrance. The windows in the ground floor are modern with small pediments, and in the upper floors they are sashes with flat brick arches and fluted keystones.	II*
8A and 9–11 Bold Lane; 52.92398°N 1.48032°W		c. 1712	Originally a malthouse, it was converted into the Royal Theatre in 1773. This closed in 1864, and the building has since been used for other purposes. It is in painted stucco, with quoins, two floor bands, a moulded stone eaves cornice, and a coped parapet. There are two storeys, three bays, and a single-storey bay on the right. In the ground floor is a modern front, and the upper floor contains three tall semicircular-arched windows in plain architraves. The right bay contains a round-headed doorway with a radial fanlight.	II
2–4 Market Place; 52.92278°N 1.47716°W		Early 18th century	A large house later converted into shops, it is in red brick with stone dressings, a cornice below and above the top floor, and a parapet. There are four storeys and eight bays. In the ground floor are modern shop fronts, and a coach arch with a rusticated surround. The upper floors contain sash windows in moulded lugged architraves, those in the first floor with cornices and keystones.	II
25–31 Wardwick; 52.92237°N 1.47987°W		Early 18th century	The building, which has an earlier core, is in red brick with stone dressings, a floor band, a moulded stone eaves cornice, a high coped parapet, and a tile roof. There are three storeys and six bays. In the ground floor are modern shop fronts, and to the left is a doorway with pilasters and a semicircular fanlight. The upper floors contain sash windows with eared architraves.	II
Gates, Industrial Museum; 52.92558°N 1.47599°W		1728	The gates to the silk mill were removed in 1910 and erected on their present site at the entrance to the museum in 1980. They were designed by Robert Bakewell, and are in wrought iron. The gates have an elaborate overthrow, including a family crest.	I
Friary Hotel; 52.92334°N 1.48375°W		c. 1730	A large house, later enlarged and converted into a hotel, it is in red brick with stone dressings on a high stone plinth, with giant angle pilasters, a moulded eaves cornice, and a brick parapet. There are three storeys, seven bays, and recessed wings. In front is a later porte cochère on columns, and a doorway with attached Doric columns. The windows are sashes with keystones.	II*
35–36 St Mary's Gate; 52.92447°N 1.47932°W		1731	A pair of houses in red brick on a stone plinth with stone dressings, the sides rendered. There are three storeys, a central block of four bays flanked by quoins, and with a moulded cornice. On each side are two-bay wings of a similar height, the left with a small cornice and parapet, and the right with a cornice below the top floor windows. In the central block is a doorway with a rectangular traceried fanlight and a cornice, and the right wing contains a round-headed doorway with a moulded architrave and a traceried fanlight. The windows in all parts are sashes, those in the central block and the top floor of the right wing with keystones.	II*
2 Amen Alley; 52.92450°N 1.47733°W		1734	The building is in red brick with stone dressings on a stone plinth, and has a stone coped parapet and a slate roof. There are three storeys and a symmetrical front of five bays. In the centre is a round-arched entrance with a rusticated surround, and steps leading to a recessed doorway with a moulded surround and a five-light fanlight. The windows are sashes, those in the middle bay with keystones, the keystone in the window above the entrance with the date inscribed.	II
1 and 3 College Place; 52.92514°N 1.47737°W		18th century	The house, which was extended in 1821, is stuccoed, with moulded eaves and a hipped tile roof. There are two storeys and sides of three bays. In the centre of the entrance front is a porch and a doorway with a rectangular fanlight. On the left return is a bow window, and the other windows are sashes.	II
34–36 Corn Market; 52.92236°N 1.47682°W		Mid 18th century	A pair of shops in red brick with stone dressings, a modillion frieze, an eaves cornice, and a brick panelled parapet. There are four storeys and four bays. In the ground floor are modern shop fronts, and the upper floors contain sash windows. In the first and second floors they have cornices on consoles, those in the right bay also with triangular pediments, and in the top floor they have wavy rusticated lintels.	II
37 and 38 Corn Market; 52.92248°N 1.47682°W		Mid 18th century	A pair of shops flanking an archway, in red brick with stone dressings, a modillion eaves cornice, and a brick parapet. There are three storeys and five bays, the middle bay projecting slightly under a modillion open pediment. In the centre is an archway with a rusticated stone surround, flanked by modern shop fronts. Above the archway is a Venetian window, over that is a semicircular window, and the outer bays contain sash windows.	II
99 Friar Gate; 52.92373°N 1.48519°W		Mid 18th century	A large house in red brick with stone dressings on a moulded plinth, with a moulded stone cornice and a brick parapet. The main block has three storeys and a basement and five bays. 14 steps lead up to t a central round-headed doorway that has engaged Doric columns, a traceried fanlight and a keystone. The windows are sashes with moulded surrounds and small triple keystones. To the left is a three-storey two-bay wing containing a rusticated coach arch, and at the rear is a Venetian window.	II*
100 Friar Gate; 52.92365°N 1.48491°W		Mid 18th century	A red brick house on a stone plinth, with stone dressings, a moulded eaves cornice, and a parapet. There are three storeys and four bays. The doorway in the right bay has plain pilasters, a radial fanlight, and a modillion cornice. The windows are sashes with rusticated lintels and keystones.	II
115A, 116, 117 and 117A Friar Gate; 52.92314°N 1.48192°W		Mid 18th century	A pair of shops in red brick with stone dressings, a moulded eaves cornice, a brick parapet, and a tile roof with a coped gable on the right. There are three storeys and five bays. Steps lead up to a central doorway with rusticated jambs, a moulded surround, a tripartite fanlight, a triple keystone, and a cornice on consoles. The doorway is flanked by modern shop fronts, and the upper floors contain sash windows with flat brick arches and keystones.	II
49–55 Wardwick; 52.92263°N 1.48062°W		Mid 18th century	A row of shops in red brick with stone dressings, a moulded eaves cornice and a tile roof. There are three storeys and six bays. In the ground floor are modern shop fronts. The upper floors contain sash windows, those in the fourth bay with an eared architrave and a keystone, and the others with rusticated lintels.	II
Lloyds Bank; 52.92354°N 1.47755°W		18th century	The building is on a corner site, and has a ground floor in stone on a plinth. The upper floors are in red brick with stone dressings, chamfered quoins, a cornice over the ground floor, and a parapet. There are three storeys and fronts of five bays. The doorway, angled on the corner, is flanked by granite columns. The ground floor windows have round-arched heads with keystones, between them are rusticated pilasters, and under them are panels. The other windows are sashes, those on the front with moulded surrounds, in the middle floor with keystones treated as pedestals, and in the top floor with flower motifs.	II
Jorrocks Public House; 52.92362°N 1.47755°W		18th century	The public house is stuccoed, with quoins on the left, [[molding (architecture)|moulded] ]wooden eaves, and a tile roof. There are three storeys and two bays. In the ground floor is a 19th-century inn front, and the upper floors contain sash windows in moulded architraves, those in the top floor dog-eared with floral motifs.	II
24 and 24A Iron Gate; 52.92441°N 1.47788°W		Late 18th century	A shop with a workshop at the rear in red and brown brick with a slate roof. There is a narrow two-bay front with four storeys facing the road, and a six-bay three-storey workshop range at the rear. In the ground floor of the front is a 20th-century shop front, the first floor contains a wide window with a dentilled cornice, above are two windows with top-hung casements, the top floor has paired glazed gables with finials. At the rear, facing the yard, are large windows with cast iron frames.	II
33 Market Place; 52.92304°N 1.47623°W		Late 18th century	A house in red brick with stone dressings, on a plinth, with a moulded eaves cornice, a parapet and a tile roof. There are three storeys and two bays. The doorway has a moulded surround and a rectangular fanlight, and the windows are sashes with flat brick arches.	II
35–36 Market Place; 52.92285°N 1.47666°W		Late 18th century	A pair of shops in red brick with stone dressings, moulded sill bands, and a band at the top. There are four storeys and three bays. The outer bays contain bow windows rising through the lower three storeys. In the ground floor are modern shop fronts, between them is a round-headed doorway with a fanlight, and above the doorway are sash windows in the first and second floors. To the right is another round-headed doorway, above which are blind windows.	II
Bell and Castle Inn; 52.91614°N 1.48040°W		Late 18th century	A public house and two attached terraced houses, they are in red brick, the public house painted, with modillion eaves and a slate roof. There are three storeys, the public house has six bays, and the houses have three. The public house has plain doorways, and those in the terraced houses have fanlights. The windows are sashes, those in the lower two storeys of the houses with wedge lintels and keystones.	II
Police Station; 52.92438°N 1.48072°W		1798	Originally an inn, and later used for other purposes, it was extended in 1828 by Matthew Habershon. It is in red brick with stone dressings on a moulded stone plinth. There are three storeys, two bays facing St Mary's Gate, and long returns. The windows are sashes with channelled lintels and keystones. On the end facing St Mary's Gate is a moulded panel with the royal coat of arms of William III.	II
18–19 Iron Gate; 52.92459°N 1.48168°W		Late 18th to early 19th century	A shop on a corner site, it is in red brick on a stone plinth, with stone dressings, a floor band, a moulded stuccoed eaves cornice, and a parapet. There are three storeys and four bays. In the ground floor is a shop front with a dentilled frieze, a moulded cornice, a doorway with a fanlight, and modern glazing. The windows are sashes.	II
11 Market Place; 52.92330°N 1.47738°W	—	Late 18th to early 19th century	A shop, probably with an earlier core, it is in red brick with stone dressings, sill bands, a brick parapet, and a stone cornice. There are four storeys and three bays, the upper three storeys slightly splayed. In the ground floor is a modern shop front, and the upper floors contain sash windows in architraves, the middle window in the first floor also with a frieze and a cornice.	II
36 Sadler Gate; 52.92312°N 1.47948°W		Late 18th to early 19th century	The building is in painted brick, probably with an earlier core, and has a floor band, plain eaves, and a tile roof. There are three storeys and two bays. In the ground floor is a 19th-century shop front, and a blocked semicircular-headed doorway to the right. The middle floor contains a two-light mullioned sash window, and in the top floor are two sash windows with a blocked window between.	II
40–42 St Mary's Gate; 52.92465°N 1.47839°W		Late 18th to early 19th century	A row of three houses in red brick on a stone plinth, with stone dressings, a sill band, moulded stuccoed eaves, a cornice, and a small parapet. There are two storeys and 13 bays, and the windows are sashes. The doorway of No. 40 has a glazed rectangular fanlight, No. 41's doorway has a moulded surround and a small cornice, and No. 42 has a portico with paired Tuscan columns, a frieze and a cornice.	II
1 Queen Street; 52.92502°N 1.47781°W		c. 1810	A shop on a corner site, it is stuccoed, and has an eaves cornice and a half-hipped slate roof. There are three storeys and a front of two bays. In the ground floor is a modern shop front, and the windows are sashes.	II
18 St Mary's Gate; 52.92454°N 1.48030°W		1811	Originally the Judges' Lodging, the building is in red brick with stone dressings, a sill band, a moulded eaves cornice, and a blocking course. There are three storeys, a front of seven bays, and two bays facing the street. In the centre is a doorway with engaged Tuscan pilasters, a radial fanlight, and a plain frieze and cornice. The windows are sashes with channelled lintels and triple keystones. On the front facing the road is a doorway with a semicircular head and a radial fanlight.	II
Wall, gates, gate piers and railings, County Hall; 52.92436°N 1.48041°W		c. 1811 (probable)	Running along the front of the forecourt is a low wall with wrought iron railings. At each end is a pair of stone gate piers with cornice caps and wrought iron gates.	II
York House; 52.92386°N 1.48296°W		c. 1820	A pair of houses in red brick with stone dressings, on a plinth, with a floor band and an eaves cornice. There are three storeys and four bays. On the front are two doorways, the left with a round-arched head, an architrave with imposts blocks, a semicircular fanlight with radial glazing bars, and a keystone. The right doorway has a flat head, a reeded architrave, a rectangular fanlight, and a flat hood on brackets. Both doorways are flanked by ogee foot scraper holes. The windows are sashes with cambered and grooved wedge lintels.	II
34–35 Sadler Gate; 52.92314°N 1.47958°W		c. 1825	A pair of shops in red brick with stone dressings, a low parapet and a slate roof. There are three storeys and two bays. In the ground floor is a shop front, and the upper floors contain sash windows with channelled lintels and triple keystones.	II
19 Corn Market; 52.92203°N 1.47711°W		Early 19th century	The building is in red brick with stone dressings, a sill band, a moulded eaves cornice, and a blocking course. There are three storeys and three bays. In the ground floor is a modern shop front. The middle floor contains modern windows, and in the top floor are sash windows; all the windows have channelled lintels and keystones.	II
7 Friar Gate; 52.92339°N 1.48215°W		Early 19th century	The building is in stone on a plinth, with quoins, a sill band, a moulded cornice over the ground floor and at the eaves, and a panelled parapet, There are three storeys and four bays. In the right bay is a former coach entry with a rusticated surround. The doorway in the second bay and the flanking windows have moulded surrounds and segmental heads, and the upper floors contain sash windows, those in the middle floor with cornices.	II
118 Friar Gate; 52.92306°N 1.48178°W		Early 19th century	A stuccoed shop with plain pilasters in the upper floors, a moulded eaves cornice, and a small parapet. There are three storeys and three bays. In the ground floor are 19th-century shop fronts, including pilasters with Greek key decoration, a plain frieze and a cornice. The upper floors contain sash windows. Extending out from the middle floor is a clock.	II
5 and 7 Green Lane; 52.92137°N 1.47764°W	—	Early 19th century	A pair of shops in painted brick and rendering, probably with an earlier timber framed core, they have shop fronts in the ground floor, modillion eaves, and a continuous tile roof. No. 5 has three storeys and three bays, windows with cambered heads in the middle floor, and sliding sash windows in the top floor. No. 7 to the right is the same height but wider, and has two storeys and two bays, and contains casement windows.	II
19–20 Sadler Gate; 52.92326°N 1.47882°W		Early 19th century	The building is in engraved stucco, with quoins on the left, and a stone coped parapet. There are three storeys and five bays. In the ground floor are modern shop fronts, and a square-headed entrance to a covered way on the right. The windows are sashes, with five in the middle floor and two in the top floor.	II
10 St Mary's Gate; 52.92461°N 1.47933°W		Early 19th century	A house, probably with a 17th-century core, it is in engraved stucco, with a floor band, plain eaves, and a tile roof. There are two storeys and an attic, and a single bay. In the ground floor is a doorway with a plain surround, and a sash window to the left. The upper floor contains a three-light casement window, and in the attic is a gabled dormer.	II
11 St Mary's Gate; 52.92462°N 1.47941°W		Early 19th century	A house in engraved stucco and a parapet. There are three storeys and two bays. The doorway has wooden pilasters, a traceried fanlight, and a pedimented hood on brackets, and the windows are casements with cambered heads.	II
11A St Mary's Gate; 52.92460°N 1.47950°W		Early 19th century	A house, probably with an 18th-century core, it is in red brick, the ground floor rendered, with a stone parapet, a tile roof, and a coped gable end on the left. There are three storeys and a single bay. The doorway has wooden reeded pilasters and a small hood. The windows are casements with cambered heads, those in the upper floors with three lights.	II
25–26 St Mary's Gate; 52.92428°N 1.48025°W		Early 19th century	A pair of red brick houses on a stone plinth, with stone dressings, a sill band, a moulded cornice and a small parapet. There are three storeys and each house has two bays. The doorways have round heads and fanlights, and the windows are sashes with channelled lintels and keystones.	II
Post near Church House; 52.92563°N 1.47815°W		Early 19th century	The bollard on the pavement outside the house is in cast iron. It consists of a cylindrical post with bands and a slight taper. At the top is a domed cap and a small finial.	II
Two posts, College Place; 52.92495°N 1.47783°W		Early 19th century (probable)	The two bollards at the end of College Place are in cast iron. They consist of cylindrical posts with narrow bands and a slight taper. At the top is a knob-shaped cap.	II
Former Shakespeare public house 52.92333°N 1.47860°W		Early 19th century	The public house is in red brick with stone dressings, the ground floor painted, and it has a coped parapet. There are three storeys and three bays. To the right is a square-headed entrance, and the windows are sashes with channelled wedge lintels.	II
Guildhall; 52.92298°N 1.47641°W		1828–29	The Guildhall was designed by Matthew Habershon, refashioned after a fire in 1842, and later converted into a theatre. It is in stone, the ground floor rusticated, and has a plain frieze, a moulded eaves cornice and a blocking course, and is surmounted by four urns. There are three storeys and five bays, the outer bays projecting slightly and flanked by pilasters. In the centre is a protruding square clock tower, the upper stage arcaded and with a cupola. The outer bays contain sash windows in moulded architraves, and relief sculptures by John Bell. In the centre is an arched covered way lined by Tuscan cast iron columns.	II
21–22 Friar Gate; 52.92369°N 1.48390°W		Early to mid 19th century	A public house in red brick with stone dressings, a coped parapet, and a hipped roof. There are three storeys and four bays. In the ground floor is a late 19th-century shop front, and the upper floors contain sash windows with plain lintels and keystones.	II
25–26 Iron Gate; 52.92433°N 1.47778°W		Early to mid 19th century	The building is in red brick with stone dressings, plain eaves and a blocking course. There are three storeys and four bays. In the ground floor is a modern shop front, to the right is a segmental-headed arch with etched rustication, and to the left are two doorways with stone surrounds. The upper floors contain sash windows with flat brick arches.	II
3 St Mary's Gate; 52.92477°N 1.47846°W		Early to mid 19th century	The building is in red brick on a stone plinth, with stone dressings, a floor band, a plain frieze, a dentilled eaves cornice, a blocking course, and a hipped roof. There are two storeys and five bays, the middle projecting slightly. The central doorway has pilasters, a moulded surround, a rectangular fanlight, and a cornice hood on consoles. The windows are sashes in moulded architraves, and the window above the doorway has a panelled apron.	II
Former National Westminster Bank, Corn Market; 52.92196°N 1.47714°W		Early to mid 19th century	Originally a bank, later used for other purposes, it is in stone, and has three storeys and four bays, and a hipped roof. The ground floor projects and contains a large window and an entrance with a fanlight. The upper floors contain sash windows, those in the middle floor with moulded architraves and cornices on consoles, and in the top floor with pilaster jambs. Above is an inscribed frieze between decorative bands, a modillion eaves cornice, a central pediment containing a heraldic device, and an acroterion and a bracket at each corner.	II
The Brunswick Inn; 52.91833°N 1.46410°W		Early to mid 19th century	The public house was built as accommodation for railway workers. It is in red brick with stone dressings on a plinth, with a floor band, moulded eaves and a slate roof. There are two storeys, seven bays, and a curved bay on the right corner. On the front are two doorways, one converted into a window, with pilasters and a pediment, and the other windows are sashes, one of which is blocked.	II
Liversage Almshouses; 52.91741°N 1.47038°W		1836	The almshouses are in red brick with stone dressings, coped parapets, and a tile roof. There are two storeys, a central projecting gabled bay flanked by eight bays on each side, the end bays projecting and gabled. The central bay contains a pointed doorway, above which is a large Perpendicular window. On the front are paired doorways in projecting porches, and the windows have moulded surrounds and hood moulds. Enclosing the front garden is a low stone wall with iron railings.	II
Derwent Bridge; 52.91953°N 1.46370°W		1836–40	The bridge was built by the North Midland Railway to carry its line over the River Derwent, and it was widened in 1892 by the Midland Railway. The bridge is built in gritstone with soffits in red brick and blue engineering brick, and is a skew viaduct with five segmental arches. The original part has pointed cutwaters, and those of the later part are rounded.	II
Serbian Orthodox Church; 52.91677°N 1.47856°W		1838–41	Originally an Anglican parish church, it closed in 1976 and opened as a Serbian Orthodox Church in 2010. It was designed by Matthew Habershon, and the canted chancel was added in 1865. The church is built in stone with tile roofs, and consists of a nave, a chancel, and a steeple. The steeple has a tower with angle buttresses, and a porch, over which is a three-light window with a pointed arch. Above this is a clock face with a square surround and a hood mould, single-light bell openings with hood moulds, an embattled parapet, and a recessed octagonal spire with lucarnes and a weathervane. The windows on the body of the church are lancets.	II
3–8 Victoria Street and 22–24 Corn Market; 52.92180°N 1.47713°W		1839	Originally the Royal Hotel, later a row of shops on a corner site, the building is in stone, partly stuccoed. There are four storeys, with a frieze and a cornice below the top storey, two bays on Victoria Street, five on Corn Market, and three curved bays on the corner. In the ground floor are modern shop fronts. In the middle two floors, flanking the central corner bay are giant fluted Ionic half-columns, and outside the three central bays are paired pilasters.	II
114–122 Green Lane; 52.91871°N 1.47850°W		c. 1840	A terrace of five stuccoed houses with modillion bracket eaves and a slate roof. There are two storeys and each house has two bays. The windows are sashes in moulded architraves, with cornices on consoles. On the front are three projecting porches, the middle porch with a bow window and an arched doorway on each side, and the outer porches are rectangular with pilasters and semicircular-headed windows. In the roof are four gabled dormers.	II
Litchurch Lodge; 52.91048°N 1.46642°W	—	c. 1840	The house is in engraved stucco, and has a slate roof with a gable on the right and hipped elsewhere. There are two storeys and four bays, the left bay projecting and canted. In the second bay is a projecting porch on square panelled columns, and a doorway with a semicircular fanlight. Most of the windows are sashes, and the others have single lights and pointed heads.	II
Wilderslowe House; 52.91618°N 1.47256°W	—	c. 1840	A stone house with two storeys in three parts, with panelled pilasters flanking each part, and fronts of two, two and three bays. The outer parts have hipped slate roofs, and the centre part projects, with a cornice and an open balustrade. In the centre of the right part is a portico with Ionic columns, a plain frieze, a cornice and a blocking course, and a doorway with a traceried fanlight. The windows are sashes, those in the ground floor of the outer parts with cornices on consoles.	II
Midland Hotel; 52.91570°N 1.46393°W		1840–41	The hotel, designed by Francis Thompson, is in red brick with stone dressings on a plinth, with quoins, floor bands, a large cornice under the top floor, and a blocking course. The main block has three storeys and a symmetrical front of seven bays, the outer bays projecting. In the centre is a portico on paired square columns, and the windows are sashes with moulded surrounds. The windows in the middle floor have balconies, those in the inner bays blind. There have been later extensions.	II
Entrance Lodge (north), Derby Arboretum; 52.91339°N 1.47395°W		1840–43	The lodge, designed by Edward Buckton Lamb, is in red brick with stone dressings and a tile roof, and is in Jacobean style. There are two storeys, and three bays with shaped gables and obelisk finials. On the front are two canted bay windows, one with a single storey and the other with two. On the left side is a porch with a semicircular-headed doorway and a shaped gable.	II
13–61 Calvert Street; 52.91761°N 1.46471°W		1842	A long terrace of cottages built for railway workers and designed by Francis Thompson. They are in red brick on stone plinths cut below each doorway to form a step, and a slate roof. There are two storeys and cellars, and each cottage has a single bay. The doorways are paired, the windows are sashes, and all the openings have gauged brick arches. No. 13 has a shop front with pilasters and a cornice, and a concave end wall.	II
1–11 Leeds Place; 52.91741°N 1.46448°W	—	1842	Two terraces of cottages in red brick with two storeys, built for railway workers and designed by Francis Thompson. Nos. 1–4 were converted into a printing office, and contain two shop fronts with cornice pilasters. The doorways in the cottages and the windows, which are sashes, have gauged brick arches.	II
1–7 Midland Place; 52.91699°N 1.46496°W		1842	Two terraces of cottages in red brick built for railway workers and designed by Francis Thompson. There are two storeys and cellars, and most cottages have two bays. They have stone plinths, a floor band, coped parapets with decorative brickwork, and slate roofs. The doorcases are in stone, with pilasters, fanlights and bracketed flat hoods, and the windows are sashes.	II
2–15 Railway Terrace; 52.91775°N 1.46413°W		1842	Two terraces of cottages built for railway workers and designed by Francis Thompson. They are in red brick with stone dressings on a stone plinth, with a floor band, and a coped parapet and gables. There are two storeys and cellars, and most cottages have two bays. The doorways have steps, stone jambs, a fanlight, a frieze with triglyphs, and a cornice. The windows are sashes with stuccoed sills and gauged brick arches. On the corner of No. 15 is a wrought iron bracket.	II
1–8 Sheffield Place; 52.91747°N 1.46455°W		1842	A U-shaped terrace of cottages built for railway workers and designed by Francis Thompson. There are in red brick with slate roofs and two storeys. In the centre, the terrace projects as a polygonal feature with decorative brickwork in the upper floor. The doorways and the windows, which are sashes, have gauged brick arches.	II
The Loco Sports Club; 52.91709°N 1.46519°W		1842	The building was designed by Francis Thompson as accommodation for railway workers. It is in red brick with stone dressings, a floor band, a coped parapet with brick decoration, and a slate roof. There are two storeys and a cellar, a curved corner, and fronts of three and five bays. On the corner is a shop front with pilasters and a cornice, to its left is a doorway with a hood on brackets, and the windows are replacement casements.	II
Central Fountain, Derby Arboretum; 52.91212°N 1.47377°W		1845	The fountain, designed by Andrew Handyside, stands in a large circular stone basin with moulded walling and rendered pond lining. It has a square stone base and a lower cast iron basin with a gadrooned lip. Rising from this is a circular shaft with foliate decoration carrying a smaller upper cast iron basin with a triple-decker central fountain spout.	II
Gate Lodge, Derby Arboretum; 52.90965°N 1.47274°W		c. 1845	The lodge, designed by Edward Buckton Lamb, is in red brick with stone dressings and a tile roof with two shaped coped gables. There is a single storey and attics, and the windows are mullioned. The main doorway has a pointed arch and a cornice, and to the right is a doorway with a plain surround and sidelights.	II
Rosehill House, outbuilding and walls 52.90913°N 1.47223°W		1840s (probable)	The house is in red brick with diapering in blue Staffordshire brick,sandstone dressings, a sawtooth eaves cornice, and a tile roof with cast iron ridge cresting. There are two storeys and an attic, a front of three bays, and a later two-storey extension to the left. The middle bay projects as a tower with a shaped coped gable, it contains a doorway with a four-centred arched head, and the windows are casements. The south front has two gables, a two-storey canted bay window, and a single-storey bow window, and above is a sundial. To the northeast is a gabled single-storey outbuilding in brick with tile hanging, and attached to it is a brick wall with railings that extends to form a boundary wall around the north and west sides of the garden.	II
1–2 Albert Street; 52.92178°N 1.47658°W		1848	A shop on a corner site in red brick with stone dressings, quoins on the corners, floor bands, a plain frieze, a modillion eaves cornice, and a parapet. There are three storeys, a main front of five bays, a curved bay on the corner, and one bay on the left return. In the ground floor is a modern shop front. The upper floors contain sash windows in moulded architraves, those in the middle floor with segmental pediments, the pediment on the corner bay containing a cartouche. On the left return is a protruding clock.	II
Shelter, Derby Arboretum; 52.91228°N 1.47245°W	—	c. 1850	The shelter near the eastern entrance is in red brick with stone dressings on a stone plinth, and has a moulded cornice on brackets, and a parapet with a cartouche and a shield. On the front is a stone arcade with three arches, the middle arch segmental and the outer arches semicircular. Each arch has square columns with decorative capitals, moulded bases, and a keystone.	II
Urn, Derby Arboretum; 52.91201°N 1.47285°W		c. 1850	The urn is in cast iron on a square two-stepped stone base. It is circular, and has a tall moulded stem with foliate decoration. At the top is a broad bowl decorated with raised patera on the outside, and with a gadrooned lip.	II
19 Friar Gate; 52.92365°N 1.48370°W		Mid 19th century	A shop in red brick with stone dressings, a moulded eaves cornice, and a shaped parapet. There are three storeys and two bays. In the ground floor is a modern showroom front, and the upper floors contain sash windows with channelled lintels and triple keystones.	II
21 Sadler Gate; 52.92324°N 1.47897°W		Mid 19th century	A shop in red brick with stone dressings, moulded eaves and a slate roof. There are three storeys and two bays. In the ground floor is a modern shop front, and the upper floors contain sash windows, those in the middle floor with channelled wedge lintels.	II
24 Sadler Gate; 52.92323°N 1.47915°W		Mid 19th century	A shop in red brick with stone dressings, a moulded eaves cornice and a parapet. There are three storeys and two bays. In the ground floor is a modern shop front, and the upper floors contain sash windows with channelled wedge lintels and triple keystones.	II
25 Sadler Gate; 52.92322°N 1.47925°W		19th century	A shop with a stuccoed front on an earlier timber framed core, with a stone coped gable. There are two storeys and an attic, and two bays. In the ground floor is a modern shop front, and above are casement windows.	II
Carlton Hotel; 52.91508°N 1.46750°W	—	Mid 19th century	The hotel is in red brick with stone dressings on a plinth, with a sill band, moulded wooden eaves and a slate roof. The main block has three storeys and three bays, and to the right are two lower single-bay extensions, one with two storeys and an attic, and the other with two storeys. The central doorway has a wooden canopy on square fluted wooden columns, flanked by canted bay windows. In the upper floors are sash windows, the window above the doorway with a semicircular head and a keystone, and the outer ones have cornices on consoles, and in the roof are two hipped dormers. The windows in the ground floor of the extensions have channelled lintels and keystones. In front of the hotel are wrought iron railings.	II
Lamp standard, Arboretum Square; 52.91231°N 1.47186°W		Mid 19th century	The lamp standard is in iron. It stands on a large octagonal stone pedestal in a small square stone-paved area in the centre of the Square.	II
Railings and gates, Derby Arboretum; 52.90937°N 1.47216°W	—	Mid 19th century	The railings are in cast iron, and extend along the southern boundary of the arboretum. They include a pair of cast iron entrance gates at either side.	II
Walls and railings, London Road; 52.91701°N 1.47055°W		19th century	The walls along the southwest side of London road are in stone with plain cast iron railings. They extend for about 150 feet (46 m) to the north of the statue of Florence Nightingale, and about 120 feet (37 m) to the south.	II
Entrance Lodge (east), Derby Arboretum; 52.91214°N 1.47213°W		1851–52	The lodge was designed by Henry Duesbury, and is in red brick with stone dressings on a stone plinth. There are three bays with pilasters, the middle bay surmounted by a centrepiece, with a round-headed niche flanked by coupled pilasters, containing a statue of Joseph Strutt. Above it is a segmental pediment and obelisk finials. The outer bays contain round-headed doorways with fanlights and keystones, and above them are a panelled frieze, a cornice, pediments containing an escutcheon, and a parapet with urns and ball-head finials.	II
Derby City Church; 52.92258°N 1.48140°W		1852–54	A temperance hall, later a church, designed by H. I. Stevens, in red brick and painted stucco on a plinth, with a slate roof. There are two storeys, and the front has a dentilled gable and floor bands. In the centre is a giant rusticated arch. The ground floor contains a doorway, over which are three blind semicircular arches. In the upper floor are three round-arched windows with pilasters and keystones, over which is a circular window with four keystones. Along the sides are eight bays divided by pilasters and containing round-arched windows.	II
Former Crown and Cushion Public House; 52.91510°N 1.46693°W		1853	The public house, on a corner site, is stuccoed, and has a moulded sill band, dentilled eaves, and a hipped slate roof. There are three storeys, three bays on each front, and a curved bay on the corner. On the front are Corinthian-style pilasters, rusticated in the ground floor. The windows are casements with moulded surrounds; in the ground floor they are paired, with round-arched heads, keystones and cornices, and in the middle floor they have segmental heads and hood moulds. The window in the middle floor of the curved bay has an arched pediment on consoles containing a scrolled cartouche and the date, and a wrought iron balcony on decorative consoles. The doorways have round-arched heads and keystones.	II
37–38 St Mary's Gate; 52.92456°N 1.47887°W		1859	Originally the Court of Probate, the building is in red brick on a stone plinth, with stone dressings, a floor band, a plain frieze, and a moulded eaves cornice. There are two storeys and five bays. In the centre is a round-headed doorway with a concave surround, above which is a carved roundel containing the Royal coat of Arms, and around it are inscribed scrolls. The windows are sashes in moulded surrounds. To the left is a smaller doorway with a flat head and a rusticated surround.	II
Northcliffe House; 52.92190°N 1.47496°W		1862	Originally the Corn Exchange and later used for a variety of purposes, the building is on a corner site and stuccoed. The corner block is circular with three storeys, and an elongated copper dome with a ball finial. In the ground floor is a doorway flanked by windows, each with a semicircular fanlight and a keystone carved with a head, and above the doorway is a swagged vase. In the middle floor are segmental-headed windows with keystones, and balustraded balconies on consoles, between them are decorative quatrefoils, and the top floor contains smaller round-headed windows with keystones. The corner block is flanked by wings, the left wing with two storeys, nine bays, windows with moulded round-arched heads, dentilled eaves and a hipped slate roof. The right wing has three storeys and two bays and contains segmental-headed windows.	II
Market Hall; 52.92254°N 1.47584°W		1864–66	The market hall is in red brick with stone dressings and coped parapets, and in the centre is a moulded cornice and an open balustrade. On the sides are round-headed windows in arched recesses. The entrance is in rusticated stone, with two storeys, three bays, and a pediment. In the centre is a round-arched entrance, flanked by blind arches with rusticated surrounds. In the middle of the upper floor is a large round-arched window with a keystone and a balustraded balcony.	II
St James' Church; 52.90820°N 1.46945°W	—	1867	The church, which is closed and used as a climbing centre, was designed by Joseph Peacock, and the north aisle was added in 1875. It is built in stone with tile roofs, and consists of a nave with a baptistry, north and south aisles under separate roofs, and a chancel with an apse, a sanctuary and offices.	II
Winter's Photographic Studio; 52.91502°N 1.46642°W		1867	The photographic studio is in painted brick with painted stone dressings, on a plinth, with a tile roof, two storeys and attics. In the ground floor are three pointed arches with fanlights, the middle arch containing a recessed doorway, and in the outer arches are plate glass windows. Between the arches are columns with carved capitals, and in the arches are fascia boards, some with gilded lettering. To the left is a doorway with a moulded surround with carving and the date, and to the right of the arches is a small shop window. The top floor contains a six-light window, the lights with pointed arches, in front is a small balcony, and to the right is a small window.	II
3–4 Iron Gate; 52.92368°N 1.47727°W		1868	A shop in russet brick with stone dressings, central and end pilasters, and a stone coped parapet. It is in Gothic style, and has four storeys and six bays. In the ground floor is a modern shop front, and in the floors above are sash windows. The first floor contains windows with polychromic round arches and circular shafts, and decorative tiled panels below. In the second floor are flat-headed windows with quoined surrounds, and below them a decorative band, and the top floor contains four three-light mullioned windows with polychromic round-arched heads.	II
Former General Post Office; 52.92219°N 1.47839°W		1869	The former post office is in stone, the ground floor rusticated, and is in Renaissance style. It has a moulded cornice over the ground floor, a sill band, a lettered frieze, a dentilled modillion eaves cornice, and an open balustrade. There are three storeys, a front of seven bays, three bays on the left return, and beyond is a two-storey five-bay wing. On the front are three doorways, each with a rectangular fanlight and a hood on brackets carved with lion heads. Above each of the ground floor openings is a Greek key frieze. The windows are sashes in moulded architraves, those in the middle floor with pediments on consoles, and balusters below.	II
6–7 Iron Gate; 52.92403°N 1.47732°W		1870	A stone shop in Gothic style, with a moulded eaves cornice, over which is an open balustrade. There are four storeys and three bays, with a modern shop front in the ground floor. The first floor contains an arcade with six windows recessed in cusped and pointed arches, flanked by columns with foliated capitals. In the top two floors are pilasters and paired windows. In the second floor they have cusped heads, and in front of them is a balcony on figure-head corbels, and with iron brattishing.	II
Former Derby Education Department Annexe; 52.92199°N 1.48048°W		1871	The ground floor is in stone on a plinth, the upper parts are in red brick with stone dressings, there are quoins, and a bracketed cornice over the ground floor. The building has two storeys, three bays, and a single-storey wing on the left. In the centre of the main block is a round-headed doorway with a quoined surround, voussoirs, and a keystone carved with a head. The flanking windows have flat heads, quoined surrounds, and foliage keystones. The upper floor contains five round-headed sash windows with pilasters, and in front are cast iron panels. At the top is a brick parapet with stone baluster panels, and in the centre is a segmental pediment with carving in the tympanum.	II
110 and 112 Green Lane; 52.91894°N 1.47849°W		Late 19th century	A house in red brick with a sill band, and a slate roof with stone coped gables, two shaped and three plain, all with obelisk finials. There are two storeys and attics, and five gabled bays. The two doorways have semicircular heads and fanlights, and are recessed behind arches with pilasters and Ionic columns. In the other three bays are two-storey square bay windows. All the windows are mullioned with two or three semicircular-headed lights and keystones.	II
9 Iron Gate; 52.92412°N 1.47734°W		Late 19th century	A shop in yellow brick with dressings in stone, red and blue brick, floor bands, other polychromatic bands, a moulded eaves cornice and a coped gable. It is in Gothic style, and has four storeys and a single bay. In the ground floor is a modern shop front. The upper floors each contain a three-light window, the lights with pointed arches in polychromatic brick; the windows in the first floor have columns with foliated capitals.	II
10 Iron Gate; 52.92419°N 1.47737°W		Late 19th century	A shop in red brick with stone dressings, a bracketed stone eaves cornice, and a brick parapet. There are three storeys and four bays. In the ground floor is a modern shop front, and the upper floors contain tall sash windows.	II
15–17 Iron Gate; 52.92444°N 1.47751°W		Late 19th century	A shop on a corner site in red brick with stone dressings, moulded floor bands, a modillion eaves cornice, and a brick parapet with stone balustrading. There are three storeys, fronts of four and five bays, and a curved bay on the corner. The ground floor contains modern shop fronts, between which are pilasters with vermiculated rustication. In the upper floor are sash windows, and pilasters with capitals incorporating animal heads. The middle floor contains windows with semicircular heads, between which are majolica plaques.	II
96 Osmaston Road; 52.91605°N 1.47351°W		Late 19th century	A Gothic-style house in red brick with stone dressings, and a slate roof with an ornamental ridge. There are two storeys and a basement, a front of three bays, a circular turret on the right, and a long rear wing. In the recessed left wing is a porch with a quatrefoil parapet, containing a doorway with pilasters and a pointed arch. The other bays are gabled with wrought iron finials, the left larger and with a two-storey canted bay window, the lights with cusped pointed arches, and pilasters with foliated capitals, and there is a quatrefoil in the gable. The turret contains a window with similar lights, and it has a splayed conical roof.	II
73 Wilson Street; 52.91901°N 1.47867°W		Late 19th century	The building is in red brick with stone dressings, floor bands, and a slate roof. There are two storeys, a basement and attics, and five bays; four of the bays are gabled and one gable is shaped. In the second bay, steps lead up to a round-headed doorway in a protruding porch with a cornice. The left bay contains a two-storey canted bay window. Most of the other windows have mullions, some also have transoms, and most have round-headed lights and cornices.	II
Former National Westminster Bank, Market Place; 52.92305°N 1.47725°W		1875–77	The former bank is in stone, the ground floor in polished granite, with sill bands, cornices between the floors, Greek key friezes, a moulded eaves cornice, and a parapet with four urns. There are three storeys and five bays, the outer bays projecting. In the centre is a doorway flanked by engaged columns, and the outer bays contain doorways with cornices. The upper floors have sash windows in moulded architraves, those in the middle floor with cornices.	II
Central Library; 52.92262°N 1.47971°W		1876	The library was designed in Gothic style by R. Knill Freeman, and an extension was added to the northwest in 1915. The original part is in red brick with stone dressings, moulded terracotta and tile panels, a moulded eaves cornice, a parapet, and a tile roof. There are two storeys and a basement, a clock tower in the central projecting bay, and two-bay side wings. In the centre, steps lead up to a doorway with a pointed arch, above which is a semicircular oriel window with mullioned and transomed windows. The tower rises over this, and has a clock face on each side, a gabled lantern and a spirelet. The outer bays each contains a canted three-light bay window, over which is an oriel window with five pointed lights, and a hipped roof with iron brattishing, and the other windows on the front are mullioned.	II
College of Art Annexe; 52.91885°N 1.47803°W		1876	The college is in stone, it has a tile roof with a central lantern and flèche, and is in Gothic style. There are three storeys and attics, to the left is a polygonal tower with a pointed roof, and to its right is a gabled porch containing a doorway with a pointed arch. Most of the windows are mullioned and transomed, the lights with pointed heads, and on the front are scrolled panels carved with foliage and letters.	II*
1–5 The Strand and 6–8 Wardwick; 52.92233°N 1.47888°W		1877–78	An office building on a corner site, later used for other purposes, it is in stone, with giant Corinthian pilasters, a plain frieze, a dentilled and modillion eaves cornice, over which is open balustrading. The mansard roof is in slate, and has a turret with iron brattishing. There are three storeys, fronts of five bays, and two curved bays on the corner. In the ground floor is a modern shop front. The windows are sashes, those in the middle floor have semicircular heads with voluted keystones, and baluster panels below, and those in the top floor with flat heads, moulded architraves, and bracketed sills.	II
Former National Westminster Bank, Iron Gate; 52.92409°N 1.47768°W		1877–79	The bank, later a public house, is in red brick with stone dressings, the ground and top floors faced in stone, with a Greek key frieze above the ground floor, and at the top is an elaborate frieze and a cornice. There are four storeys and seven bays. In the ground floor are rusticated pilasters, a central doorway with a segmental-headed fanlight and a voluted keystone, and in the outer bays are doorways with rectangular fanlights. The windows in the first and second floors have pilasters and cornices, and those in the top floor have Corinthian pilasters.	II
2–40 The Strand including the entrance to Strand Arcade; 52.92284°N 1.47932°W		1878–80	A long range of shops following the curve of the road in stone, with pilasters, a modillion cornice over the ground floor, a moulded eaves cornice, and open balustrading at the top. The range is mainly in three storeys, partly in four, and in the ground floor are modern shop fronts. The doorways on the front are round-arched, with panelled pilasters, foliated keystones, carved spandrels, and open balustrades. In the upper floors are sash windows, those in the middle floor with cornices on consoles. The entrance to Strand Arcade has rusticated pilasters and a decorated lintel, above which is a semicircular arch with elaborate carving in the spandrels, and above is an inscribed frieze, and a segmental pediment containing carving.	II
Former Midland Bank; 52.92161°N 1.47632°W		1879–80	The bank is in stone on a plinth, the ground floor rusticated, and it has a modillion cornice over the ground floor, sill bands, a dentilled modillion eaves cornice, an open balustrade, and a slate roof with iron brattishing at the apex. There are three storeys and attics, a front of five bays, six bays on the left return, and a two-storey three-bay extension beyond. The doorway has a carved surround, an entablature, a swagged cartouche, and a cornice. The ground floor windows have round-arched heads, and those above have moulded architraves. The windows in the middle floor have alternate segmental and triangular pediments and panels below, and in the top floor are sash windows with dog-eared architraves.	II
15–21 and 25 St James's Street; 52.92243°N 1.47828°W		c. 1881	A row of shops in stone, with a modillion cornice over the ground floor and below the top floor, a moulded eaves cornice over which is balustrading, and four storeys. In the ground floor are inserted shop fronts between which are panelled pilasters with capitals carved with animal heads. Also, there are two round-headed doorways with panelled pilasters, carved spandrels and keystones, and balconies with balustrades on fluted consoles. The windows are sashes in architraves, and between those in the first and second floors are plain pilasters. The windows in the first floor have cornices on consoles, and in the second floor they have keystones.	II
St Thomas' Church; 52.90563°N 1.47628°W		1881–83	The church, designed by Joseph Peacock in Norman style, is in sandstone with a tile roof. It consists of a nave with a lean-to porch, north and south aisles, north and south transepts, and a chancel with a vestry. On the chancel roof is a truncated flèche and cross finials. Most of the windows have round-arched heads, and the others are wheel windows.	II
10 Wardwick and 1–10 Haymarket Arcade; 52.92241°N 1.47930°W		1882–83	Originally a mechanics' institute, the building is in stone, the lower two floors rusticated, with pilasters, cornices between the floors, an eaves cornice with an egg and dart frieze, and at the top a balustrade and an entablature inscribed with the date. There are three storeys and nine bays. In the ground floor are inserted shop fronts, and a central round-arched doorway with Corinthian-style pilasters, carved spandrels, and a voluted keystone. In the middle floor are round-arched windows with carved spandrels and figure-head keystones, and balustrades in front. The top floor contains flat-headed windows, between which are Corinthian-style pilasters.	II
Art Gallery; 52.92290°N 1.47984°W		1883	The art gallery is in red brick with stone dressings on a stone plinth, with a moulded sill band, and moulded eaves. There are two storeys and five bays. The left bay contains a round-arched doorway with pilasters, an inscribed frieze, and a modillion cornice, above which is a five-light oriel window. Between the bays are pilasters, and each of the other bays has a round-headed recess containing an eight-light mullioned and transomed window, and an elaborate open pediment containing a panel and with a scrolled top.	II
Statue of M. T. Bass; 52.92286°N 1.48034°W		1885	The statue of Michael Thomas Bass, a brewer and local Member of Parliament, is by Joseph Edgar Boehm. It is in bronze and depicts Bass standing by a desk. The statue is on a stone pedestal and base.	II
Former Offices of East Midlands Gas Board; 52.92338°N 1.48188°W		1889	The building is in red brick with stone dressings on a steel frame, and has a cornice over the ground floor, an eaves cornice, and a brick frieze, lettered and dated. It is in Jacobean style, with two storeys, a basement and attics, and three bays with coped gables, the middle gable shaped, and all with ball and obelisk finials. In the middle bay is a round-arched doorway with a decorative fanlight and a curved hood mould. The right bay contains a two-storey canted bay window, and the other windows either have a single light or are mullioned. In front of the building are wrought iron railings.	II
Former Derby Education Department Offices; 52.92211°N 1.48086°W		1890–93	The building is in stone with pilasters, rusticated in the ground floor and Corinthianesque above, a dentilled cornice over the ground floor, a modillion eaves cornice, a balustrade with urns, and a hipped slate roof. There are two storeys and a front of nine bays, the middle three bays projecting slightly. In the centre is a portico with pilasters, a frieze and a pediment, containing a round-headed doorway with an animal-mask keystone. The ground floor windows have flat heads, those in the upper floor have round-arched heads, moulded architraves, pilasters and voluted keystones, the middle window with carved spandrels. At the top is a central entablature, containing a panel carved with a coat of arms, over which is a semicircular shell pediment, and behind is a truncated pyramidal roof with iron brattishing.	II
Former Iron Gate Tavern; 52.92429°N 1.47742°W		c. 1895	The public house is in stone with a rusticated plinth, giant pilasters, vermiculated in the ground floor, with Corinthianesque capitals incorporating masks, sill bands, moulded eaves and a blocking course. There are four storeys and five bays. In the centre is a square-headed carriage entrance, and a doorway to the right with a rectangular fanlight. The windows are sashes in moulded architraves, those in the first floor with pediments on elaborate brackets.	II
Former County Court; 52.92056°N 1.47691°W		1897	The former county court, designed by Arthur Eaton, is in red brick and buff terracotta, with floor bands, pilasters in the upper floor, each surmounted by a lion with a shield, and a green slate roof with two gables. There are two storeys, a basement and attics, and seven bays. The two doorways have moulded surrounds, fanlights with semicircular-arched heads, and fleur de lys finials, the main doorway also has a hood forming a gable containing lettering. Most of the windows are mullioned and transomed, and in the apex of each gable is carved foliage and lettering.	II
20 Friar Gate; 52.92367°N 1.48378°W		1901	A shop in red brick with stone dressings, floor bands, and a coped gable with a ball finial, containing a panel inscribed with the date. In the ground floor is a modern showroom front, and the upper floors contain sash windows.	II
Former Tramway Offices; 52.92184°N 1.47800°W		1903	The building, at one time a post office, was designed for the Derby Tramways Company probably by Alexander MacPherson. It is in red brick with stone dressings on a polished marble plinth, and has bands and a tile roof. There are four storeys and an irregular front, with a canopy over the ground floor. To the left is an octagonal tower with a copper domed roof, behind which is a hipped roof with an octagonal cupola. The main doorway has a chamfered surround and an oval fanlight, and in the canted left corner is a doorway above which is an inscribed plaque and a pediment with a circular opening. Most of the windows are mullioned and transomed, and in the right part they have cornices and pediments.	II
Reginald Street Baths; 52.91085°N 1.46953°W		1904	The building, larter converted for residential use, is in red brick with stone dressings on a stone plinth, and is in Jacobean style. The front has two storeys and attics, a central range of three bays, and projecting wings. In the centre is a two-storey bow window with a curved parapet carved with the date. The windows are mullioned and most also have transoms. Over the ground floor windows is a continuous hood mould, and above the upper floor is a dentilled cornice. At the top of the central range is a coped gable surmounted by a feature with a curved cornice, and below it is a projecting clock. On top of the wings are large ornamental lanterns with domes and finials.	II
33–34 Iron Gate; 52.92394°N 1.47763°W		1906	A shop in red brick with stone dressings, and a coped gable with a finial. There are three storeys and an attic, the ground floor slightly projecting with a parapet. In the ground floor is a shop front, and to its left is a doorway with a polychromic arch, over which is an elaborate double fanlight flanked by pilasters, with an arched pediment containing a cartouche and the date. In the upper floors are small-paned windows with quoined surrounds, and a two-storey canted oriel window.	II
Queen Victoria Statue; 52.91627°N 1.46926°W		1906	The statue of Queen Victoria stands by London Road, by the site of the former Derby Royal Infirmary. It is in bronze, it is by C. B. Birch, and was unveiled by King Edward VII. The statue depicts the queen standing on a granite pedestal.	II
Former Rural District Council Offices; 52.92458°N 1.47993°W		c. 1910	The offices, later a hotel, are in red brick with stone dressings on a rusticated plinth, with quoins, a pulvinated frieze, a sill band, a plain frieze, a modillion eaves cornice, and an open balustrade. The building is in Renaissance style, and has two storeys, a central block with five bays, and recessed two-bay wings. In the centre is a portico with Gibbs-style rusticated columns, a pulvinated frieze, a segmental pediment containing a cartouche and a coat of arms, and a recessed doorway with a semicircular head and a rusticated surround. The windows are casements with moulded architraves, those in the ground floor with alternating segmental and triangular pediments. Above the upper floor windows are oval windows with keystones.	II
Silk Mill Museum Of Making; 52.92582°N 1.47572°W		1910	The mill was rebuilt on the site of a silk mill of 1721, re-using some 18th-century material, in particular the arched undercroft on islands in the river. The building was opened as an industrial museum in 1974. It is in red brick, and is in three and four storeys and an octagonal tower block with an octahedral slate roof.	II
45 St Peter's Street; 52.92062°N 1.47568°W		1912	A group of shops on a corner site that was extended in 1936–37, it is stuccoed with pargeting, a modillion cornice over the ground floor, and a tile roof. There are three storeys and gabled attics, three bays on St Peter's Street, five on East Street, and an angled bay on the corner. In the ground floor are modern shop fronts. The upper floors of the three corner bays contain two-storey bay windows. Most of the windows are mullioned, those in the middle floor with transoms arched in the centre, and in the gables are small Venetian windows. In the middle floor are niches with semicircular canopies containing statues of local notable people.	II
Former Technical College Annexe; 52.92437°N 1.47974°W		1912	Originally the County Council Offices, the building is in red brick with stone dressings, quoins, sill bands, a plain frieze, a modillion cornice, and an open balustrade. The building is in Renaissance style, and has three storeys and a basement, a main block of seven bays, the middle bay slightly projecting, and recessed two-bay wings. In the centre is a portico with Gibbs-style rusticated columns, a lettered frieze, a segmental pediment containing a cartouche and a coat of arms, and a recessed doorway with a semicircular head and a rusticated surround. The windows are sashes in moulded architraves, in the lower two floors with pulvinated friezes and cornices, and in the ground floor with alternating segmental and triangular pediments. In front of the forecourt are decorative wrought iron railings.	II
Former Hippodrome Theatre; 52.92019°N 1.47840°W		1914	The theatre was later used for other purposes and is now derelict. It is built in red brick, partly rendered and painted, with terracotta dressings, a canopy over the ground floor, and a Welsh slate roof. There are three storeys, and a rectangular plan, with a north front of ten bays, and an east front of five bays, the outer bays projecting. The entrance is angled on the corner and flanked by paired pilasters. On the north front, the first bay contains a Diocletian window, to the right are five oculi with keystones, and in the end four bays are rectangular windows in all floors.	II
Statue of Florence Nightingale; 52.91710°N 1.47082°W		1914	The statue of Florence Nightingale stands by London Road by the site of the former Derby Royal Infirmary. It is in stone and is by Lady Feodora Gleichen. The statue is on a pedestal, and is at the centre of a concave stone bay.	II
St James' War Memorial Cross; 52.90823°N 1.46912°W	—	1920	The war memorial cross is in the churchyard of St James' Church. It is in gritstone with limestone panels, and consists of a Celtic wheel-head cross. The cross stands on a two-step base and a trapezoidal pedestal, it has a tapering shaft, and the wheel-head is carved with intertwined strapwork. On the pedestal are trapezoidal plaques with inscriptions, and the names of those lost in the First World War, and of those involved in the dedication of the cross.	II
War memorial, St Thomas' Church; 52.90557°N 1.47654°W	—	c. 1920	The war memorial in the churchyard is in sandstone, and is in the form of a Latin cross. It has a two-step base, a cruciform plinth with gabled caps, and a tall shaft that tapers to an octagonal section under the cross head. On the plinth are plaques with inscriptions, and the names of those lost in the two World Wars.	II
Midland Railway War Memorial; 52.91556°N 1.46477°W		1921	The war memorial was designed by Edwin Lutyens and is in Portland stone. It consists of a cenotaph about 10 metres (33 ft) high, surmounted by a carving of an Unknown Soldier lying on a catafalque carried on the heads of four lions. Under this, on each side, is a carving of the coat of arms of the Midland Railway in a wreath, and on the front is an inscription. The cenotaph stands in an enclosure with two alcoves, on the rear walls of which are bronze plaques with the names of the employees of the railway lost in the First World War.	II*
War memorial, Market Place; 52.92318°N 1.47647°W		1921	The war memorial was designed by Charles Clayton Thompson, with a sculpture by Arthur George Walker. It is in stone and the sculpture is in bronze, depicting a mother and child in front of a stone [Celtic cross]]. At the rear is a bronze sword of justice. The statue stands on a plinth on a base of two steps. On the front is an inscription relating to both World Wars.	II
Magistrates Court; 52.92393°N 1.47497°W		1932–34	The building is in red brick with stone dressings on a plinth, with a coped parapet and urns, and hipped Westmorland slate roofs. There is a hollow square plan, with a corner entrance, and a central two-storey range set diagonally within. The entrance has three arched doorways, above which are three windows with cornices and wrought iron balcony railings, the middle window with a scroll pediment. Above are three square windows, and a shallow pediment with a cartouche. Flanking the entrance is a pair of bronze standard lamps.	II
Former First Church of Christ, Scientist; 52.92231°N 1.48433°W		1934–38	The church, later used for other purposes, is in brown brick on a plinth, with stepped parapets and flat concrete roofs. There is a cruciform plan, and on the front are three round-arched windows, flanked by recessed round-arched porches with chamfered corners and doorways with fanlights. Above and behind is a hall block with three tall round-arched windows.	II
