= St Peter's Church, Derby =

St Peter's in the City
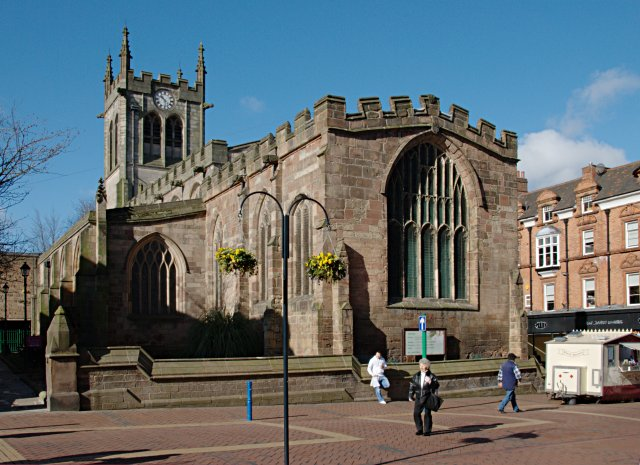
- St Peter's in the City
- 52.920°N 1.4757°W
- OS grid reference: SK 35308 36015
- Location: Derby, Derbyshire
- Country: England
- Denomination: Church of England
- Website: http://www.stpetersderby.org.uk

History
- Founded: circa 1045

Architecture
- Style: Norman
- Years built: circa 1050

Administration
- Diocese: Derby
- Parish: Derby St Peter's

Clergy
- Vicar: Rev Canon Paul Morris
- Priest: Rev Anita Matthews

Listed Building – Grade II*
- Official name: Church of St Peter and attached boundary walls
- Designated: 20 June 1952
- Reference no.: 1229224

St Peter's in the City is a Church of England parish church in the city of Derby, Derbyshire, England. It is one of Derby's city centre churches which is in full use for worship. The church building dates from the 11th century. The tower has a peal of eight bells, which are rung before the Sunday morning services.

The church and its boundary walls were awarded Grade II* listed status in 1952.

== Church history ==
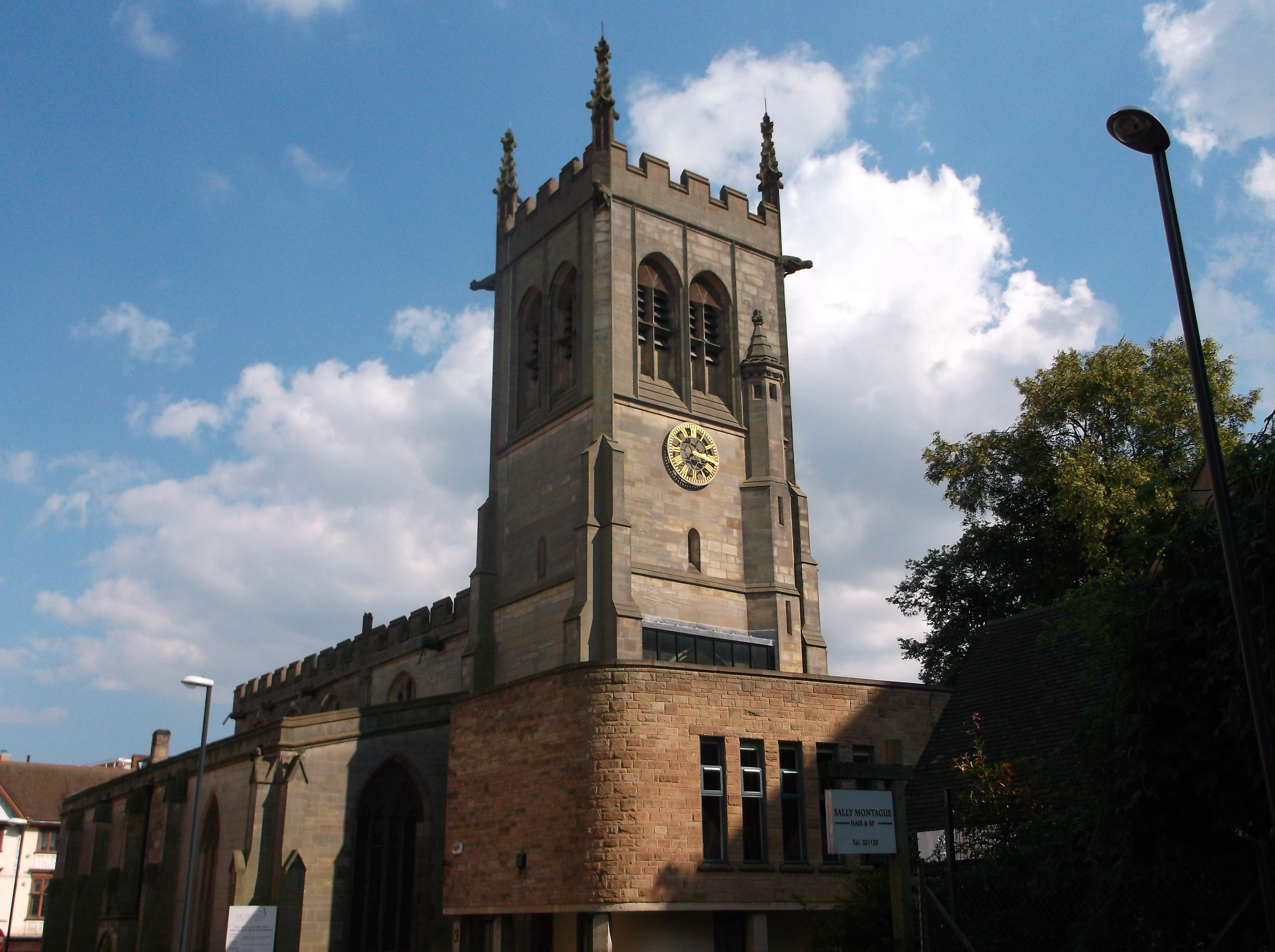
Derby St Peters NW aspect

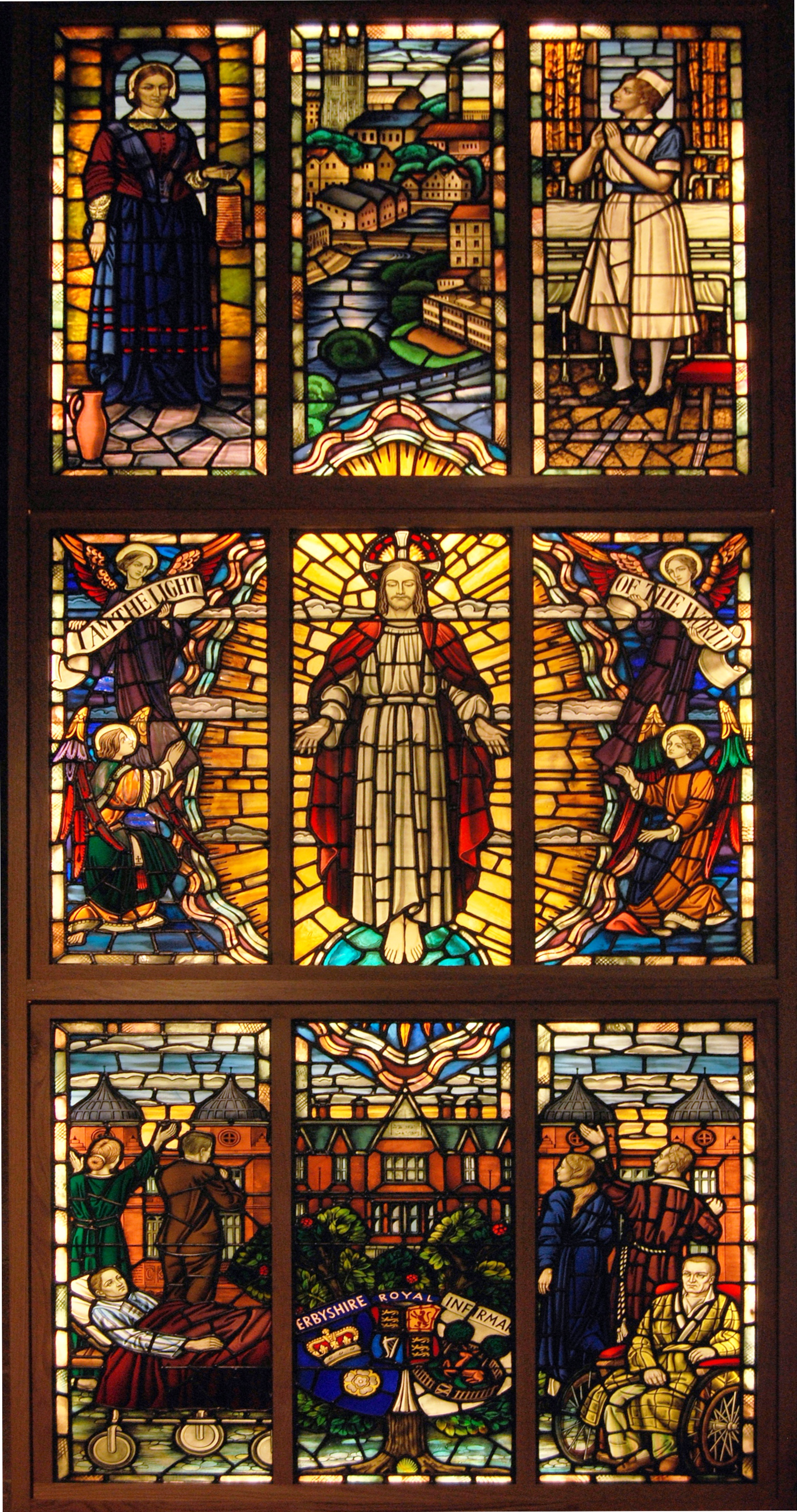
Derby DRI stained glass window at St Peters

First recorded around the reign of Edward the Confessor, around 1042 onwards, the church is recorded, along with three other churches in Derby, in the Domesday Book of 1086.

In 1137 the church came under the jurisdiction of the Abbots of nearby Darley Abbey until the dissolution of the monasteries. Rebuilding in 1338 instigated by the first curate, John de Crich, saw the south aisle and Chantry added. Although significantly rebuilt around 1350 in the decorated style the church retains Norman features at the eastern end of the church on the east wall of the nave and the arcade responds. Five light windows survive in the south and north aisles from the 14th century. The church is the only medieval church remaining in the city centre.

The original steeply pitched roof was lowered in 1509, the walls over the nave arcades raised and clerestory windows inserted. The chancel arch was widened and the east end was shortened by a bay and a new east window installed. The tower was also rebuilt at this time. The bells, a familiar sound to Derbians, were cast and hung around 1636 and are still in regular use, one having never needed recasting.

The late 18th century saw galleries added to the nave but, in 1852 the chancel was restored and the pews, along with the impropriator's (lay rector's, see Chancel repair liability) gallery removed. Plaster was also removed and old roof timbers exposed. In the same decade the chancel and aisles were again restored and the large galleries at the west end of the nave removed. 1865 saw the south porch removed, the organ chamber made at the east end of the north aisle. In 1898, the west end of church and tower rebuilt were entirely rebuilt with great sympathy for the existing ancient east end of the church. In 1970, the present church and parish rooms, including meeting rooms, coffee rooms, office, kitchen and toilet facilities were added to the west end below the tower.

== Historic Events ==
The Black Death visited Derby in 1349; a third of the population died, including sixty clergy, one of whom was the vicar of St Peter's.

In 1530 Robert Liversage established a chapel for divine service. Each Friday, thirteen poor men and women were paid a silver penny for attending. People fought to be among the thirteen. The Liversage Almshouses are nearby on London Road, the vicar and churchwardens being ex-officio trustees because Robert Liversage's 1531 will bequeathed most of his property to benefit the parish poor.

Joan Waste, a St Peter's parishioner and blind rope maker, was tried for heresy at what is now Derby Cathedral in 1556. She refused to deny her faith and was burned at the stake at Windmill Pit near Burton Road.

The plague again broke out in Derby in 1586, starting in St Peter's parish.

Around 1650, Oliver Cromwell stole an Elizabethan chair that had been presented to St Peter's in 1593. Amazingly, the chair was discovered at auction in 1960, and a churchwarden was able to negotiate its return.

Robert Bakewell, the British metalsmith, who died in 1752, is buried in the churchyard.

William Cowper is said to have written, in 1768, the hymn Hark my Soul it is the Lord in the upper vestry at St Peter's.

== Clock ==
The clock was manufactured by John Smith of Derby in 1900 and installed in 1902. It is a flat-bed movement with a double three legged gravity escapement designed by Edmund Beckett, 1st Baron Grimthorpe. The pendulum weighs 2½ cwt. The clock drives two 6 feet (1.8 m) diameter skeleton dials on the East and West sides of the tower. The Cambridge Quarters strike on bells 2, 3, 4 & 7, and the hours strike on number 8. It was presented by John Henry Whitaker in memory of his mother, Mary Ann Whitaker, who died on the 2 March 1900.

== Organ ==
A pipe organ by Elliot dating from 1820 was replaced by a new organ by Forster and Andrews of Hull which was opened on 18 August 1852. A new organ by J.H. Adkins of Derby was donated in memory of Sir Edwin T. Ann by Lady Ann and dedicated on 23 November 1921

The current pipe organ was installed in 1986 by Cousans of Lincoln A specification of the organ can be found on the National Pipe Organ Register.

=== Organists ===
- Mr. Stenson ca. 1843
- Mr. Tilbury 1852 – 1853
- Charles H. Norton 1854 - 1856
- Jonathan Adlington 1856 - ca 1862
- Theodore Drew ca.1868 – 1873 (afterwards organist of St Luke's Church, Shepherd's Bush)
- W.L. Dodd. 1887 – 1890 (formerly organist of St Alkmund's Church, Derby, afterwards organist of St Andrew's Church, Derby)
- W.H.L. Dodd 1890 – 1945
- G.H. Boulderstone 1945 – 1948 (formerly organist of St Chad's Church, Derby)
- Neville Chadwick 1952 - 1962 (afterwards organist of St Paul's, Chipperfield, Hertfordshire)

== St Peter's today ==
During 2010, St Peter's Church raised £6,000 to rehouse and display the Florence Nightingale stained glass window in a back-lit position at the west of the north aisle. The window was originally commissioned in the late 1950s for the chapel at the Derbyshire Royal Infirmary, which has moved operations to Mickleover and is due for redevelopment. On 9 October 2010, the church rededicated the window in a service featuring the Hospital Choir and the Rolls-Royce Male Voice Choir with original music by Dana and Anne de Waal. The Rt Rev Alastair Redfern, Bishop of Derby, presided.

Although thought was given to closing the church because of small congregations in the late 1960s, the church now plays an important and active role in the City of Derby. In the summer of 2011, the second Derby BID (Business Improvement District) was formed with St Peter's Church at its geographical centre. The St Peter's Quarter exists to promote and enhance the area, as does the nearby Cathedral Quarter. Early in 2012, the church was enhanced to continue serving the community as it has for a thousand years. The improvements have enabled the church, as a building and a mission, to offer the St Peter's Quarter, and the city as a whole, a variety of services. Derby City Chaplaincy uses St Peter's as its central hub. The innovative "Christmas Lunch on Jesus" project has, for the last three years, provided many Derby families with a Christmas hamper delivered to their door.

== See also ==
- Grade II* listed buildings in Derby
- Listed buildings in Derby (Arboretum Ward)
