= St Augustine's Church, Derby =

- Location within Derbyshire
- 52°54′22.2″N 1°28′55.5″W
- Location: Derby, Derbyshire
- Country: England
- Denomination: Church of England

History
- Dedication: St Augustine
- Consecrated: 27 April 1898

Architecture
- Heritage designation: Derby Local List
- Architect: Naylor and Sale
- Groundbreaking: 17 October 1896
- Completed: 29 October 1910

Administration
- Diocese: Diocese of Derby
- Archdeaconry: Derby
- Deanery: Derby South
- Parish: Walbrook Epiphany

St Augustine's Church, Derby is a Church of England parish church in Derby, Derbyshire.

== History ==
A mission church was established in 1888 in Stanhope Street, Derby, to serve the growing community in housing constructed by the Midland Railway. However, this became inadequate for the population, so a new church dedicated to St Augustine was planned.

The first sod was cut by Henry Howe Bemrose MP in July 1896 and the foundation stone was laid on 17 October 1896 by Michael Bass, 1st Baron Burton. The architects were Naylor and Sale and the contractors were J.E. Tomlinson and Company of Belgrave Street, Derby.

By 1898 the nave had been completed, and this was consecrated on 27 April 1898 by the Bishop of Southwell, Rt. Revd. George Ridding.

The south aisle was added in 1905, and the chancel a few years later. The chancel was built by the contractor H. Chattle of Empress Road, Derby, with the oak work by Mattyn and Company of Cheltenham. It was dedicated on 29 October 1910 by the Bishop of Southwell, Rt. Revd. Edwyn Hoskins.

In 1996 the four parishes of St Thomas’, Derby, St James', Derby and St Chad's, Derby were united with St Augustine's as the new parish of Walbrook Epiphany.

== Organ ==
A harmonium was provided when the church opened, but this was replaced in 1900 by a pipe organ by Noble of Melbourne Street, Derby. A new 2 manual and pedal organ was installed by J.H. Adkins in 1910. A specification of the organ can be found on the National Pipe Organ Register. Pipe organ still in situ but Electronic in use since 1990s according to NPOR
