= Corn Exchange, Derby =

Commercial building in Derby, Derbyshire, England

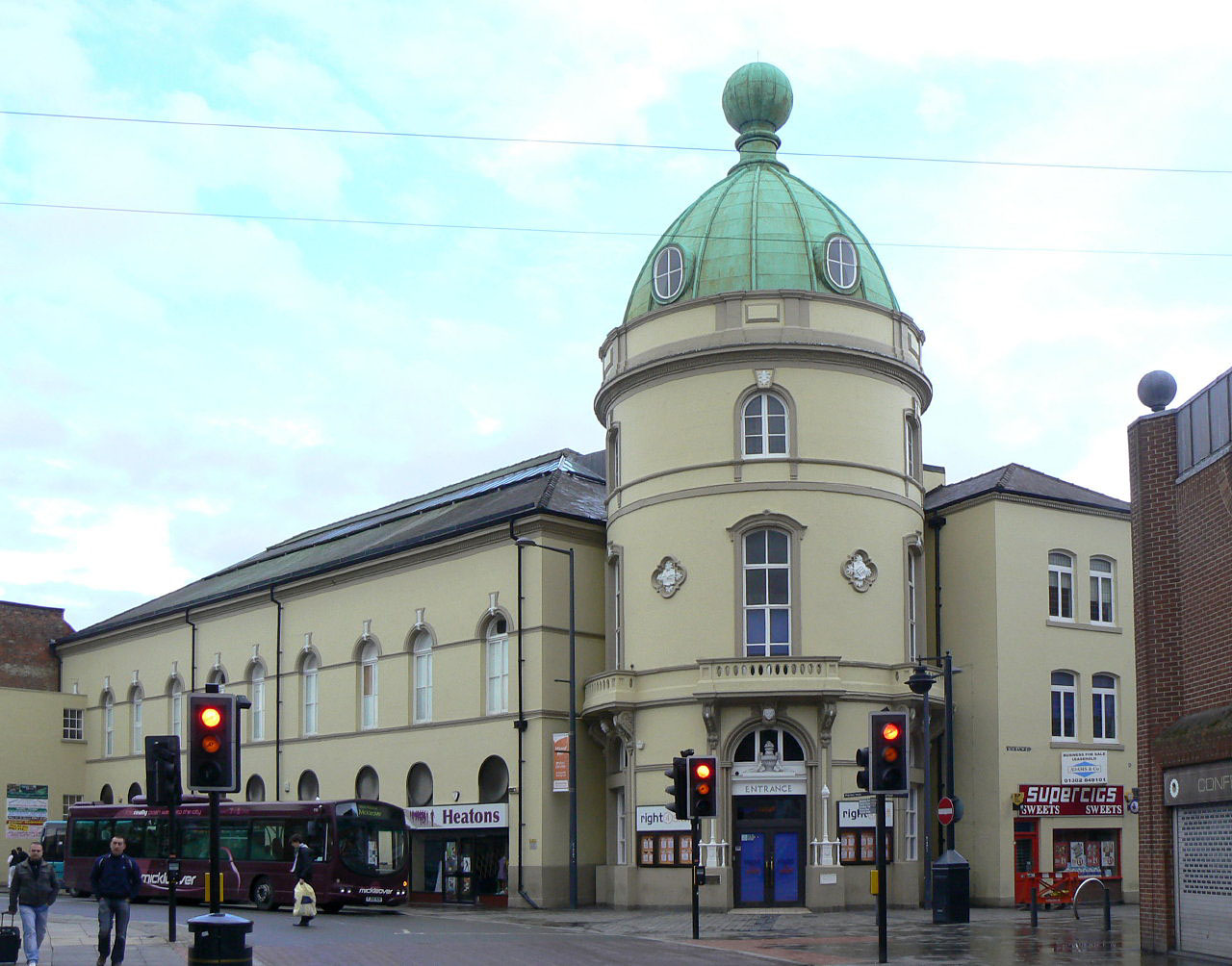
- Corn Exchange, Derby

- Shown in Derbyshire
- 52.9219°N 1.4749°W
- Location: Albert Street, Derby

History
- Built: 1860

Site notes
- Architect: Benjamin Wilson
- Architectural style: Italianate style

Listed Building – Grade II
- Official name: Northcliffe House
- Designated: 24 February 1977
- Reference no.: 1215233

The Corn Exchange is a commercial building in Albert Street in Derby, Derbyshire, England. The structure, which is currently used as an indoor sports venue, is a Grade II listed building.

== History ==
The first corn exchange in the town was established in August 1846 when Derby Corporation acquired two private houses in the southeast corner of the Market Place and then joined them together. In the late 1850s, after finding this arrangement inadequate, a group of local businessmen decided to form a private company, known as the "Derby Corn Exchange Company", to finance and commission a purpose-built corn exchange for the town. The site they selected was open land which had become available for development following the culverting of Markeaton Brook in the 1830s.

The building was designed by Benjamin Wilson in the Italianate style, built in brick and was officially opened in January 1862. The opera singer, Jenny Lind, supported by her husband, the pianist, Otto Goldschmidt, took part in a concert to celebrate the opening. The design involved a three-stage circular tower on the corner of Albert Street and Exchange Street with a long wing of nine bays facing onto Albert Street and a shorter wing of just two bays facing onto Exchange Street. The tower incorporated three round headed openings with a architraves and keystones in the first stage, three segmental headed windows with balconies supported by consoles in the second stage and three round headed windows with keystones in the third stage, all surmounted by a parapet, a prominent cupola and a ball finial. The wing along Albert Street was fenestrated with round headed windows with mouldings and keystones on the first floor. Internally, the principal room was the main hall which was 110 feet (34 m) long by 55 feet (17 m) wide.

The use of the building as a corn exchange declined significantly in the wake of the Great Depression of British Agriculture in the late 19th century. However, the building continued to be used as an events venue and, in the 1880s, the D'Oyly Carte Opera Company performed the comic opera, Iolanthe, in the building. In the 1890s, the building was acquired by the hypnotist, Charles Morritt, who brought silent films to the venue in September 1896. It was converted into a theatre known as the "Palace Theatre of Varieties" in 1897: early performers included the comedian, R. G. Knowles, but the theatre was forced to close at the start of the First World War. The building was then acquired by William Champneys who re-opened it as a dance hall known as the "Palais de Danse" in 1919. Champneys covered the building in white stucco.

The building was converted into offices for use as the headquarters of the Derby Evening Telegraph in 1929. After the Telegraph merged with the Derby Daily Express in 1932, the building became the headquarters of the enlarged business. It was renamed "Northcliffe House" in deference to the parent company, Northcliffe Newspapers, whose proprietor was Harold Harmsworth, 1st Viscount Rothermere. The Derby Telegraph moved to larger premises at the new "Northcliffe House" in Meadow Road in late 1979. In the late 20th century, it became an indoor sports venue, equipped with a licensed bar and used by the Derwent Valley Pool League and the Derby Indoor Sports Association. It subsequently became known as the "Corn Exchange Sports Bar".

== See also ==
- Corn exchanges in England
- Listed buildings in Derby (Arboretum Ward)
