= St Chad's Church, Derby =

- Location within Derbyshire
- 52°54′41.9″N 1°28′57.7″W
- OS grid reference: SK 34885 35035
- Location: Derby, Derbyshire
- Country: England
- Denomination: Church of England

History
- Dedication: St Chad
- Consecrated: 5 June 1882

Architecture
- Architect: H. Turner
- Groundbreaking: 19 April 1881
- Construction cost: £7,000 (equivalent to £7,700,000 in 2025).
- Closed: 1 January 1995
- Demolished: 1996

Specifications
- Length: 94 feet (29 m)

St Chad's Church, Derby was a Church of England parish church in Derby, Derbyshire.

== History ==
The foundation stone was laid on 19 April 1881 by Mr. Fitzherbert Wright. The architect was Mr. H. Turner of New Court Chambers, 57 Chancery Lane, London, and the contractor was G. Hewitt of London Road, Derby.

The church was consecrated on 5 June 1882 by Rt. Revd. Augustus Legge, the Bishop of Lichfield.

Pevsner described the church as rock faced with an east bell-turret. A typical 'railway church.

It was closed on 1 January 1995 and demolished in 1996. In 1996 the four parishes of St James’, Derby, St Augustine's, Derby and St Thomas’, Derby were united as the new parish of Walbrook Epiphany.

== Organ ==
An organ was installed in 1882 by Nicholson and Lord. A specification of the organ can be found on the National Pipe Organ Register.

=== Organists ===
- W.G. Parkinson 1882 - 1896
- T. Herbert Bennett 1896 - 1905 (previously organist at St Thomas' Church, Derby, afterwards organist of All Saints’ Church, Derby)
- Henry Ravensdale 1905 - 1914 (formerly organist of Darley Abbey Church)
- Oswald Augustine Munro Steele -1917 (formerly assistant organist of Southwell Minster. Killed in action 23 April 1917 (Seaforth Highlanders))
- G.H. Boulderstone 1917 - 1945 (afterwards organist of St Peter's Church, Derby)
