= Gloucester Arms, Kensington =

Pub in Kensington, London

Gloucester Arms
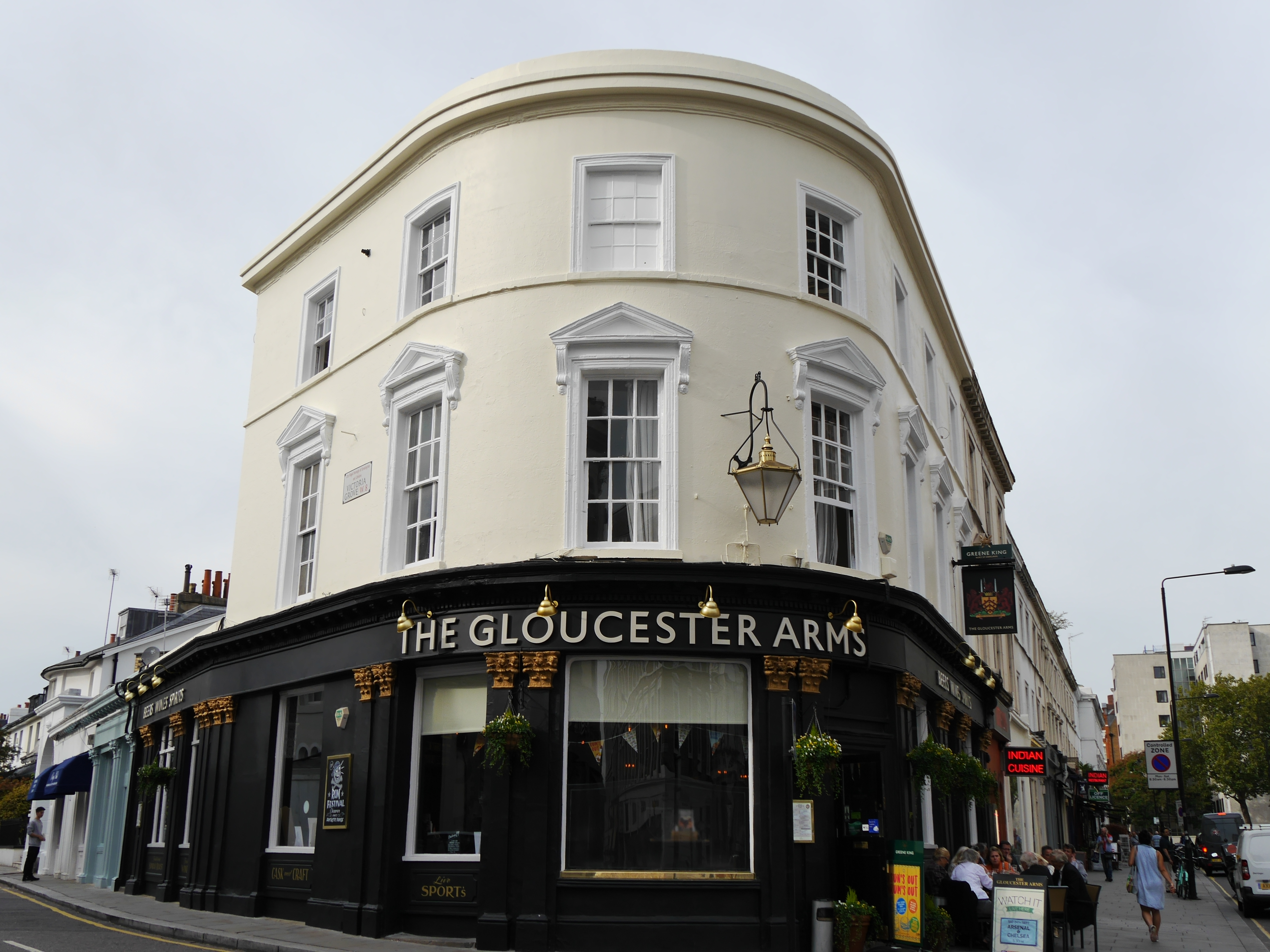
- The Gloucester Arms, 2016

- Location within Royal Borough of Kensington and Chelsea Location within Greater London

General information
- Location: 34 Gloucester Road, London, England
- Coordinates: 51.498797°N 0.184064°W

Design and construction
- Designations

Listed Building – Grade II
- Official name: Gloucester Arms Public House
- Designated: 7 November 1984
- Reference no.: 1358152

The Gloucester Arms is a Grade II listed pub at 34 Gloucester Road, Kensington, London SW7, built in the 19th century. It is owned by Greene King.
