= St Thomas' Church, Derby =

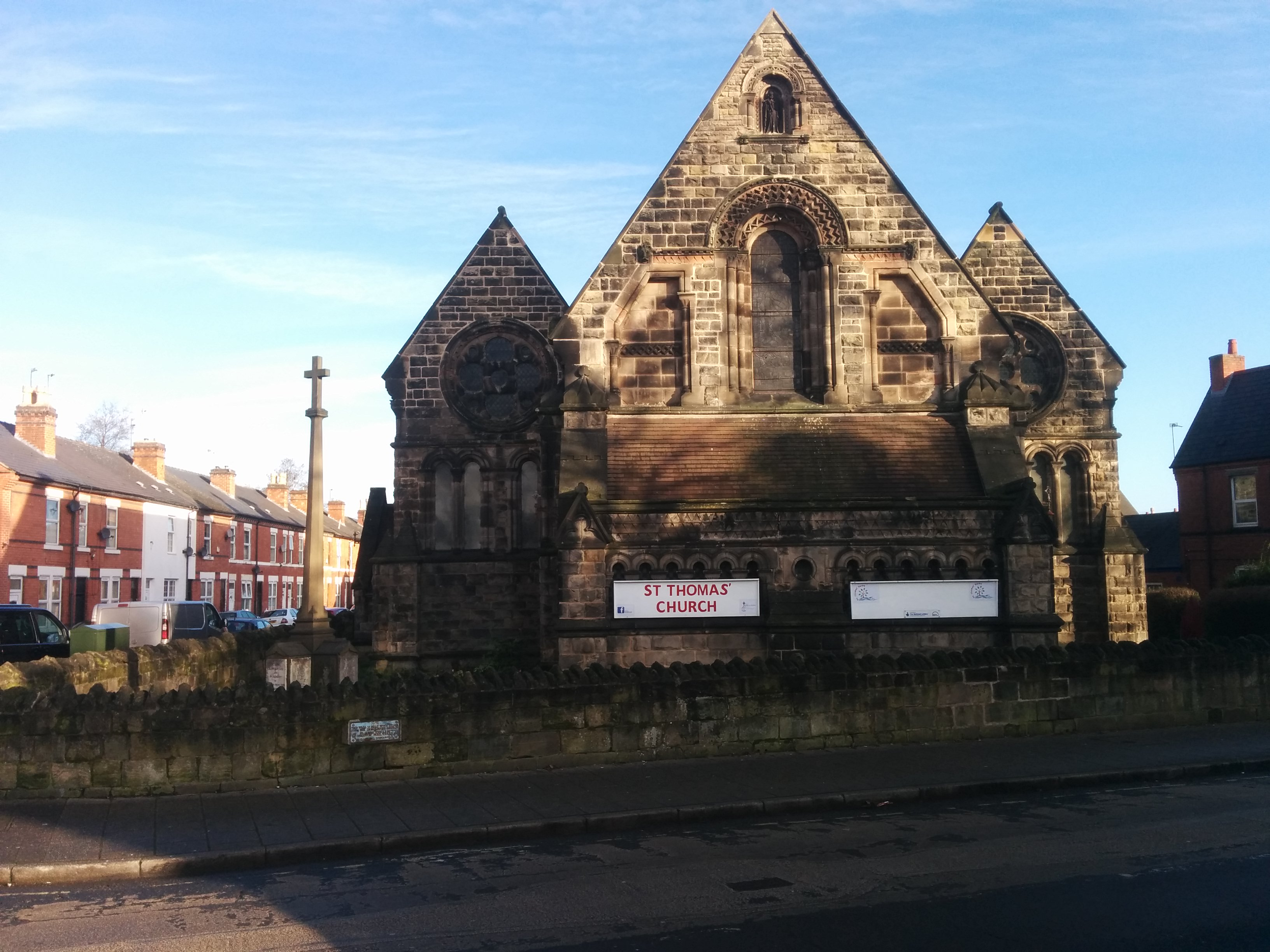
- St Thomas’ Church, Derby

- Location within Derbyshire
- 52°54′20.4″N 1°28′34.8″W
- Location: Derby, Derbyshire
- Country: England
- Denomination: Church of England

History
- Dedication: St Thomas
- Consecrated: 22 December 1881

Architecture
- Heritage designation: Grade II listed
- Architect: Joseph Peacock
- Groundbreaking: 25 March 1881
- Construction cost: £5,500 (equivalent to £580,000 in 2025).

Administration
- Diocese: Diocese of Derby
- Archdeaconry: Derby
- Deanery: Derby South
- Parish: Walbrook Epiphany

St Thomas's Church, Derby is a Church of England parish church in Derby, Derbyshire.

== History ==
The church was conceived as a memorial to the late Archdeacon Thomas Hill. The foundation stone was laid on 25 March 1881 by Mrs. Alfred Oliver, daughter of Archdeacon Hill. The architect was Joseph Peacock of Bloomsbury Square, London. Construction proceeded quickly, with the consecration taking place on 22 December 1881.

In 1996 the four parishes of St James’, Derby, St Augustine's, Derby and St Chad's, Derby were united as the new parish of Walbrook Epiphany.

== Incumbents ==
- Albert James Maxwell 1904 - 1907 (afterwards Rector of St John the Baptist's Church, Collingham)

== Organ ==
An organ was installed in 1881 by Brindley & Foster. A specification of the organ can be found on the National Pipe Organ Register.

=== Organists ===
- Mr. Hardy 1883 - ????
- J.C. Mumby ca. 1885
- T. Herbert Bennett ???? - 1896 (afterwards organist of St Chad's Church, Derby)
- Fred Corney 1896 - 1935
- Eric Barringer 1935 - ????

== See also ==
- Listed buildings in Derby (Arboretum Ward)
