= St Stephen's, Gloucester Road =

St Stephen's Church, Gloucester Road
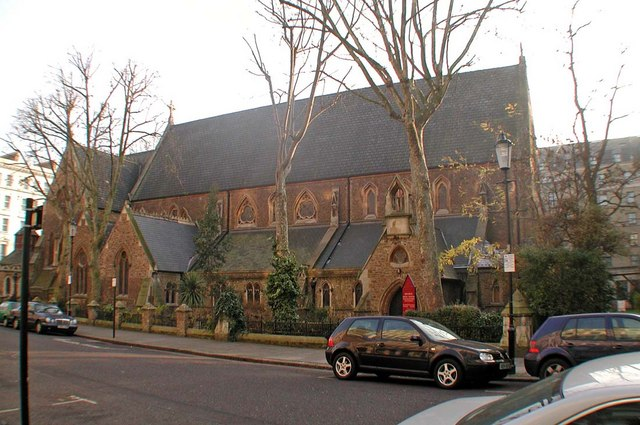
- St Stephen's, Gloucester Road
- St Stephen's Church, Gloucester Road
- 51.4957°N 0.1836°W
- Location: Gloucester Road, Brompton, London
- Country: England
- Denomination: Church of England
- Churchmanship: Anglo-Catholic

Architecture
- Architect: Joseph Peacock
- Years built: 1866–1867

Administration
- Diocese: Diocese of London
- Archdeaconry: Archdeaconry of Middlesex
- Deanery: Chelsea

Clergy
- Bishop: Rt Revd Jonathan Baker (AEO)
- Priest: Philip Barnes SSC

St Stephen's Church, Gloucester Road, is a Grade II* listed Anglican church located on the corner of Gloucester Road and Southwell Gardens in South Kensington, London, England.

== History ==
With the population of South Kensington expanding in the mid-Victorian period and the opening of Gloucester Road tube station in 1865, the Rev. John Sinclair, Vicar of Kensington and Archdeacon of Middlesex, arranged for the purchase of land from the Alexander estate to establish several new churches, including St Stephen's.

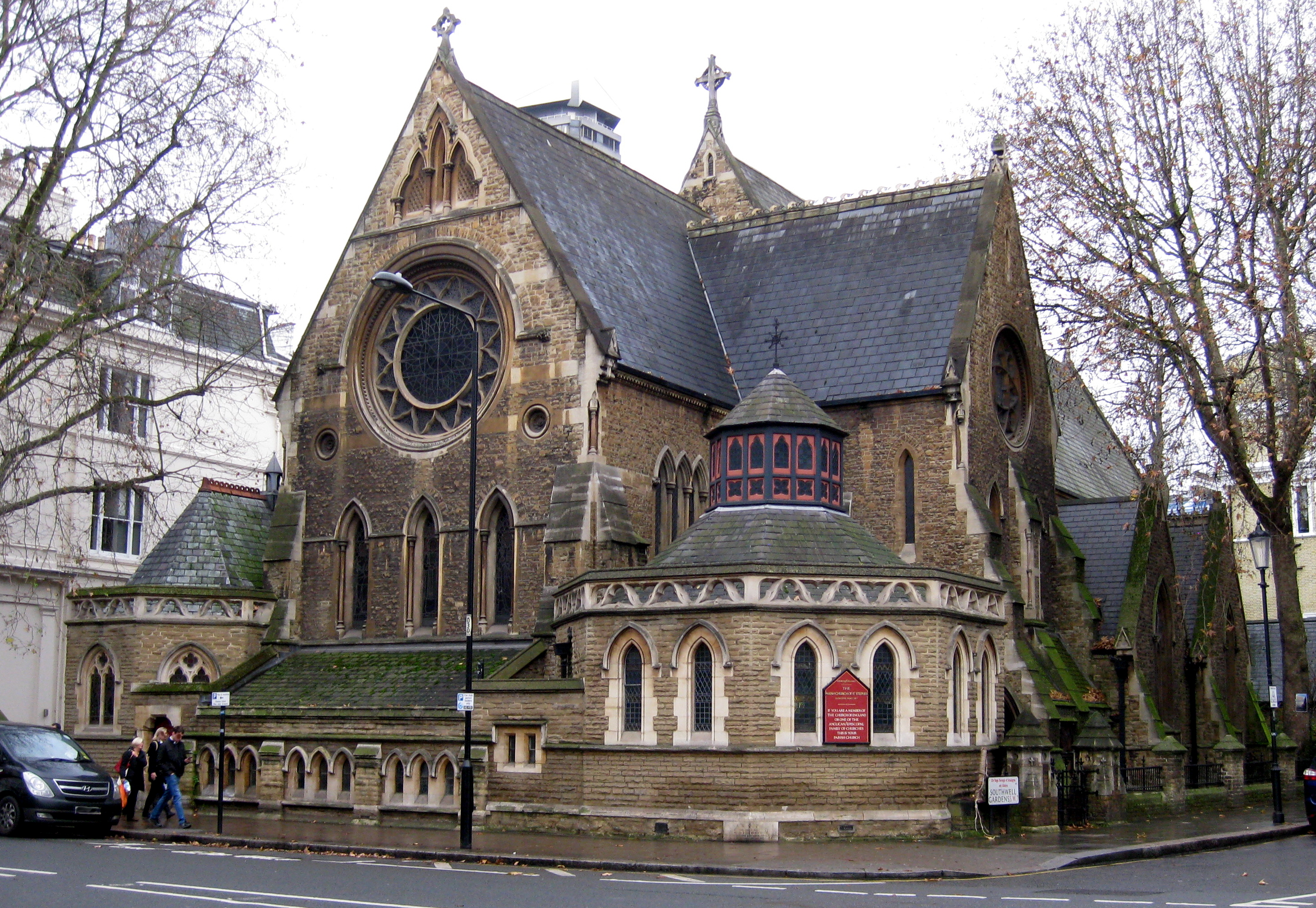
St Stephen's with its distinctive octagonal vestry

A temporary iron church was erected on the east side of Gloucester Road in 1865 while designs were sought for a permanent building. St Stephen's was built in 1866–1867 to designs by the architect Joseph Peacock, though construction ended before a tower could be added. The new building was consecrated on 10 January 1867.

Although the first vicar, the Rev. J. A. Aston, was considered an Evangelical, his successors, the Rev. J. P. Waldo and the Rev. G. Sutton Flack, had steered the parish to a more High Church stance by the late nineteenth century. In 1887 the architect Hugh Roumieu Gough added a distinctive octagonal vestry and lady chapel. Stained glass windows designed by Nathaniel Westlake were installed in the 1890s. Further changes were introduced following the installation of the Rev. Lord Victor Seymour as vicar in 1900: the architects George Frederick Bodley and Walter Tapper erected the reredos in gilded wood behind the high altar, as well as galleries for the choir and organ. Alterations continued to be made during the twentieth century, particularly in the 1930s.

== Present ==
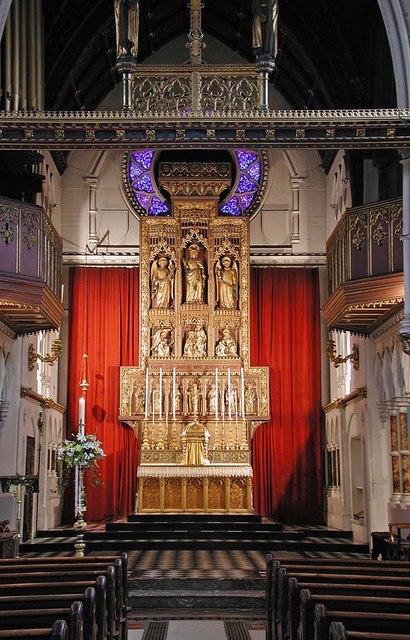
Carved wooden reredos behind the high altar

St Stephen's offers a number of Sunday and weekday Masses, with music sung by a professional choir. The organ, built in 1905 by Norman and Beard, was enlarged in 2001 by T. W. Fearn & Son.

As a traditional Anglo-Catholic parish which does not accept ordination of women to the priesthood and as bishops, St Stephen's receives alternative episcopal oversight from the Bishop of Fulham, currently the Rt. Rev. Jonathan Baker. The parish is a member of Forward in Faith.

== Notable connections ==
The church is noted for its connection with the poet T. S. Eliot. Following the traumatic breakdown of his marriage to Vivienne Haigh-Wood, Eliot sought spiritual refuge at St Stephen's. Between 1933 and 1940 he lived in the church's vicarage, first at 9 Grenville Place (1934–1937), then at 11 Emperor's Gate (1937–1940). St Stephen's played a prominent role in the development of his Christian faith as he explored the traditions and disciplines of Anglo-Catholic worship and devotional practices. For 25 years he served as a churchwarden of St Stephen's, and a memorial to him was erected in the church after he died.

Christopher Lee was an altar server at the church after World War II.

== Vicars of St Stephen's ==
The following priests have served as vicar of St Stephen's since 1867:

- 1867–1871: The Rev. John Astbury Aston
- 1871–1894: The Rev. Joseph Peter Waldo
- 1894–1900: The Rev. George Sutton Flack
- 1900–1929: The Rev. Lord Victor Alexander Seymour
- 1929–1956: The Rev. Eric Samuel Cheetham
- 1956-1988?: The Rev. Herbert Moore
- 1988?-1995 The Rev. Christopher Colven
- 1995–2016: The Rev. Reginald Bushau
- 2017–present: The Rev. Philip Barnes
