= Derby War Memorial =

War memorial in Derby, England

- England
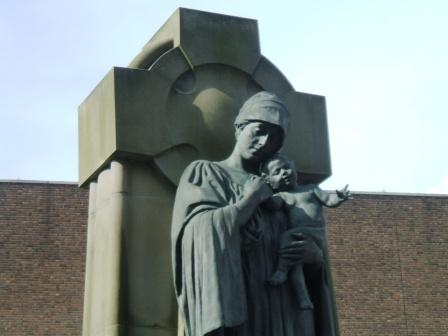
- The central figure of the Derby War Memorial
- Used for those deceased
- Unveiled: 11 November 1924
- Location: 52.923155°N 1.476498°W near Derby
- Designed by: Arthur George Walker (sculptor)

Listed Building – Grade II
- Official name: War Memorial
- Designated: 31 August 2007
- Reference no.: 1392237

The Derby War Memorial was designed by Charles Clayton Thompson and stands before the Derby Guildhall. It features a bronze figure of the Virgin Mary holding the baby Jesus in her arms by the sculptor George Arthur Walker. It was completed in 1924 and unveiled on 11 November 1924. Behind this bronze figure is a large Celtic cross. The memorial was erected to commemorate the fallen of The Great War with the inscription "The Great War/1914-1918".

A later inscription, "For Faith/And Home/And Righteousness/World War 1939–1945", was added to recognize those men of Derby who died in the Second World War.

A plaque commemorates the victims of later conflicts.

== See also ==
- Listed buildings in Derby (Arboretum Ward)
- Midland Railway War Memorial, on Midland Road, close to Derby railway station
