= St Simon Zelotes =

Church in Chelsea, London

- St Simon Zelotes, Upper Chelsea
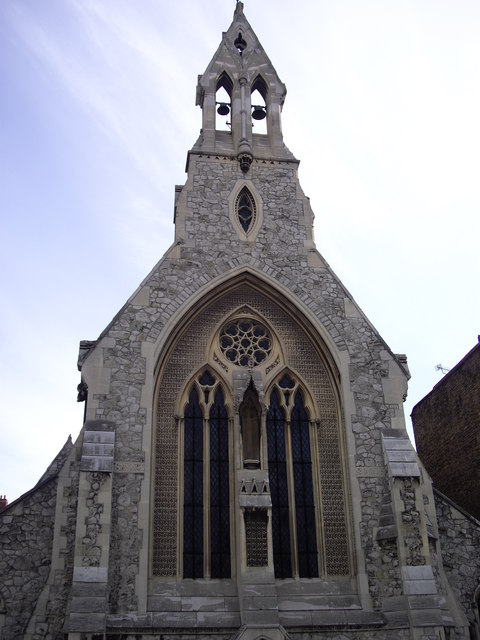
- St Simon Zelotes
- 51°29′41″N 0°09′44″W
- Location: Milner Street; Chelsea; London SW3 2QF
- Country: England
- Denomination: Church of England
- Churchmanship: Low church
- Website: www.stsimonzelotes.com

History
- Founded: 1859
- Dedication: Simon the Zealot

Architecture
- Heritage designation: Grade II listed
- Architect: Joseph Peacock

Administration
- Province: Canterbury
- Diocese: London
- Archdeaconry: Middlesex
- Deanery: Chelsea

Clergy
- Vicar: The Rev'd Michael Neville

St Simon Zelotes is a conservative evangelical Church of England church in Milner Street, Chelsea, London, England.

It was built in 1858–59, designed by the architect Joseph Peacock, and is his "most complete surviving work".

It has been grade II* listed since 1954.
