= R. G. Knowles =

Canadian-American singer and comedian

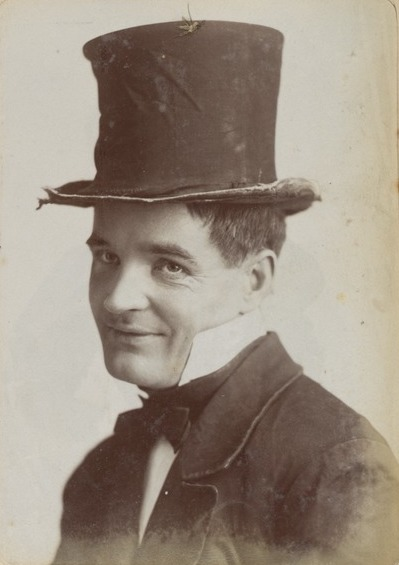
- Born: Richard George Knowles; October 7, 1858; Hamilton, Canada West
- Died: January 1, 1919 (aged 60); New York City, U. S.
- Occupations: Singer, comedian
- Years active: 1878–1918

Richard George Knowles (October 7, 1858 – January 1, 1919) was a Canadian-American singer and comedian, who was successful in the British music halls and internationally in the late 19th and early 20th centuries, billed as "The Very Peculiar American".

== Biography ==
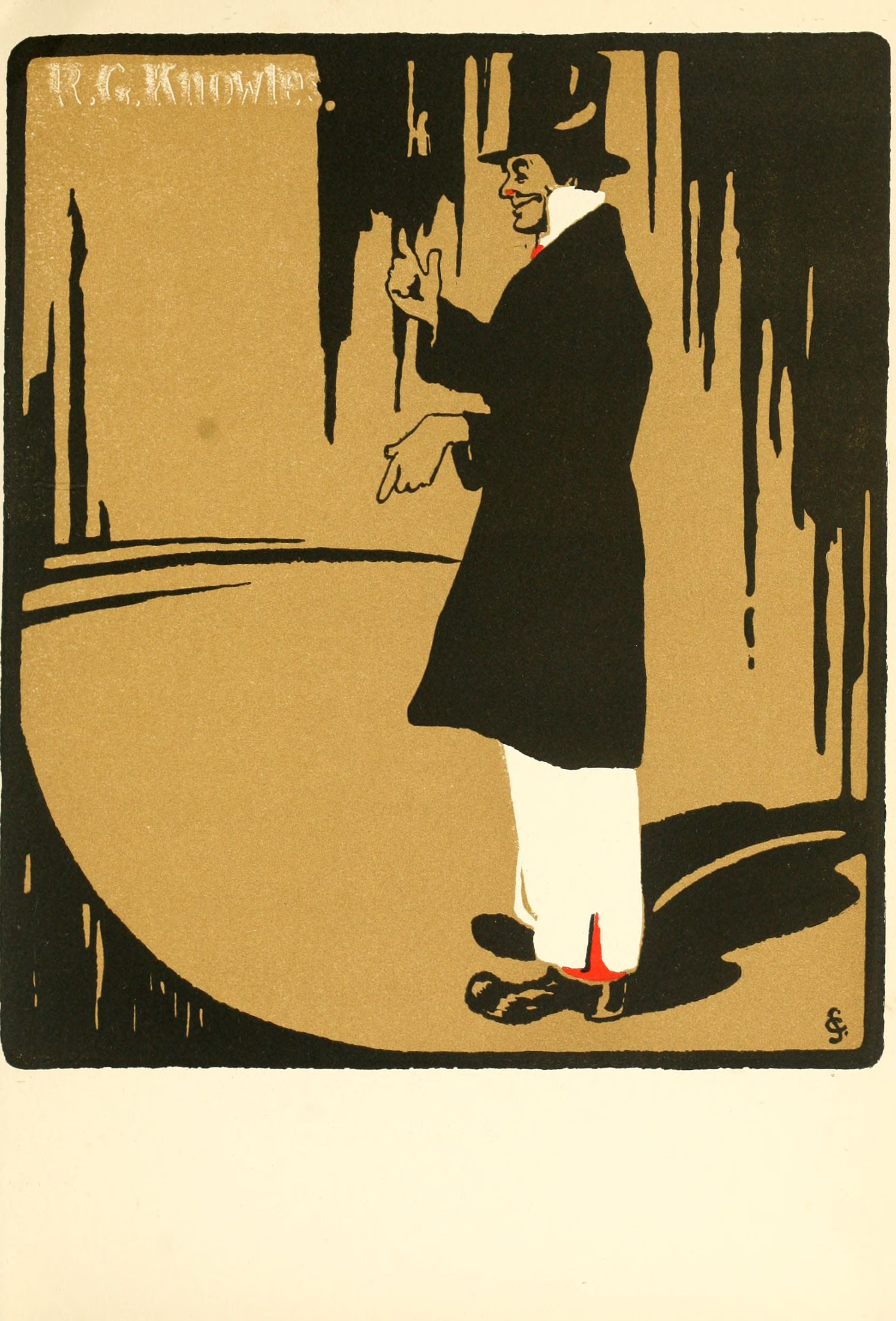
Illustration by G. F. Scotson-Clark, 1899

Knowles was born in Hamilton, Canada West, a British subject, but was raised in Chicago. He left school at the age of 12, after his father died, and worked for a while as a window dresser in a department store, before moving to Colorado for his health. There, he discovered a talent for storytelling, and decided to launch a career in entertainment.

He made his first professional appearance in vaudeville in Chicago in 1878, and appeared in New York the following year. He toured in the United States for some years, and developed his act which Peter Gammond describes as being "most of it a sustained sarcastic attack on his audience". He toured in a musical comedy, Mam’zelle, worked for some time with Haverly's Minstrels, and in 1888-89 worked as an actor in Augustin Daly's theatrical company in New York.

He made his first appearances in London at the Trocadero Music Hall in June 1891. Although he was not an immediate success, he soon gained popularity with his "husky voice, staccato delivery, and American-style humour." Billed as "The Very Peculiar American", he always appeared in a costume of "a seedy frock coat, battered top hat, and white trousers." He was described as "a neat man with a high forehead, slicked back hair and wide eyes." He had long residencies at the Empire, Leicester Square, and the Tivoli Theatre of Varieties, breaking box office records for a single performer.

His style was later compared with that of Bob Hope, and influenced the English comedian Tommy Trinder. One reviewer wrote:

He doesn’t give the audience time to catch up with him. It has no sooner seen the point of one joke and begun to laugh boisterously than another is hurled at it, with the result that when the curtain comes down, the comedian leaves both himself and his auditors breathless.

In describing his approach in his autobiography, he wrote:

I told a joke, and if the audience laughed at it I ridiculed them for being entertained with such consummate ease. If they did not laugh I jeered at their lack of appreciation and inability to observe real humour. When their mirth was not spontaneous I feigned anger at their dilatoriness. Did they anticipate me, I was equally annoyed because they were too quick. Summing up, I pointed out that if they did not laugh, well, they were losing money, on the other hand, if they indulged too hilariously, they were getting more than they were entitled to get so I invited them to go to the box office and pay up the difference.

He married Winifred Johnson (1871–1931), an American singer and banjo player, in 1893; she became his manager, and they made their home in London. Knowles became a leading attraction on the music hall stage for over twenty years, and toured around the world, performing in Britain, the United States, Canada, Ceylon, South Africa, Australia, New Zealand, and elsewhere. His most popular songs included "Girly Girly", written by Jerry Cohan, "Some Things Are Better Left Unsaid", and "On the Bench in the Park".

A keen athlete, he promoted baseball in Britain, setting up games in London, and became player-manager of the London Thespians team, which in 1893 and 1894 was the first to win successive British titles. He also helped form the London Baseball Association, and the "R. G. Knowles Trophy" was established in his honour. In 1896 he co-wrote and published a book, Baseball - The Oval Series of Games, explaining the game to a British audience.

In 1918 he published an autobiography, A Modern Columbus: his Voyages, his Travels, his Discoveries. He retired from the stage in October 1918, with a farewell performance at the Victoria Palace Theatre in London.

After returning to the United States, he died on New Year's Day, 1919, aged 60, following a throat operation at the Memorial Hospital in New York.
