= Gloucester Road, London =

Street in London

Coordinates: 51.4948°N 0.1827°W

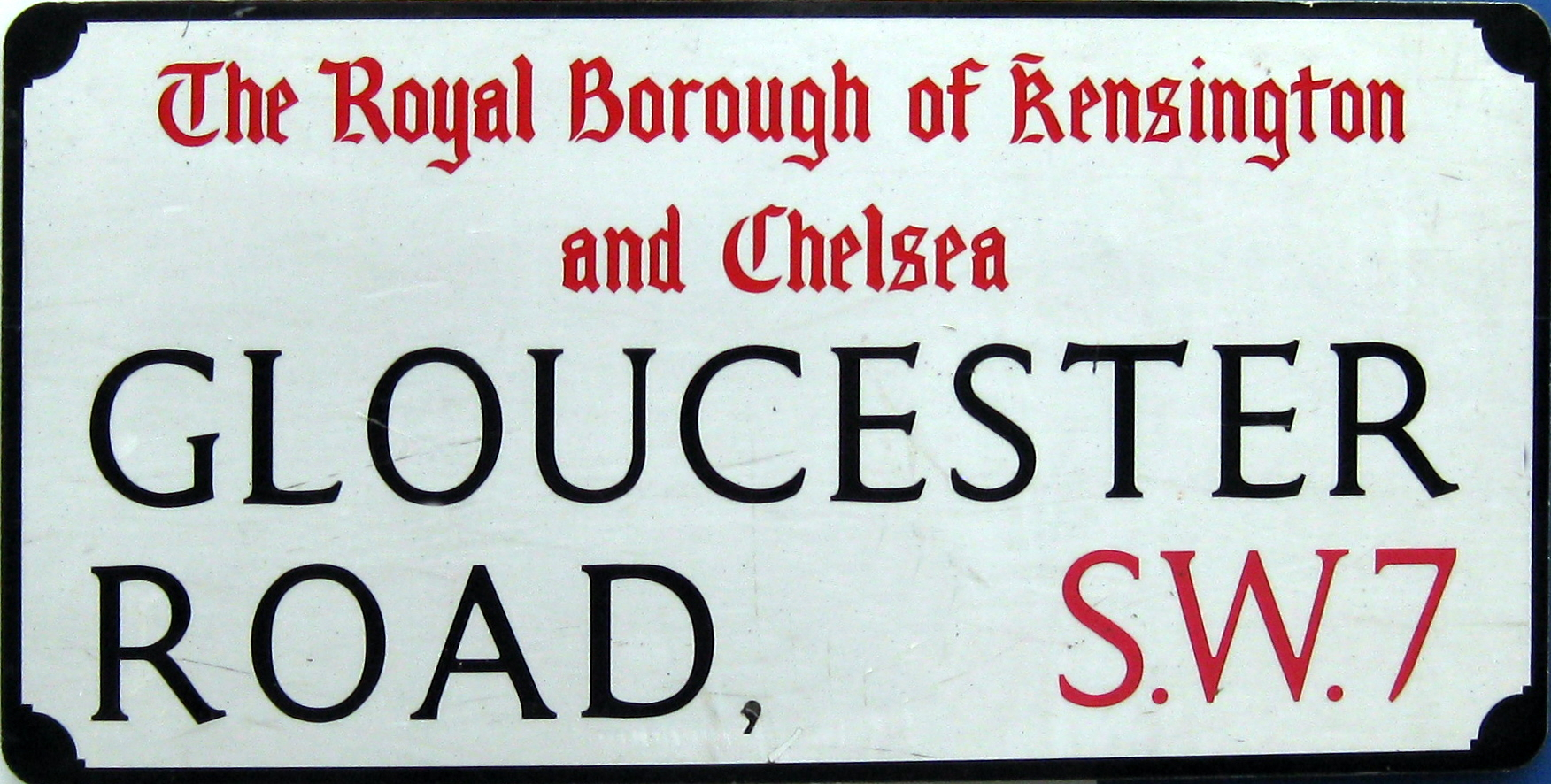
street sign

Gloucester Road (/ˈɡlɒstər/ GLOST-ər; B325) is a street in the Royal Borough of Kensington and Chelsea, London. It runs north–south between Kensington Gardens (at which point it is known as Palace Gate) and Old Brompton Road.

At its intersection with Cromwell Road is Gloucester Road Underground station, close to which there are several pubs, restaurants, and hotels.

St Stephen's Church was built in 1867: one of its former churchwardens was the poet T. S. Eliot.

== History ==
The road is named after Maria, Duchess of Gloucester and Edinburgh who had a new house, Gloucester Lodge, built there by 1805. The road was earlier called Hog Moore Lane (1612), that is 'lane through marshy ground where hogs are kept', a name that was still used until about 1850.

Gloucester Lodge was built by William Tyler, on the site of the former Florida Gardens, which the Duchess had acquired in 1797. The site is opposite the present day tube station. The Duchess, who had been widowed in 1805, lived at Gloucester Lodge with her unmarried daughter, Princess Sophia. The Duchess died in 1807. By 1809, Princess Sophia had sold Gloucester Lodge to George Canning. It later became known as Canning Villa. The house was demolished in about 1851.

Gloucester Road, between Kynance Place and Canning Place, formed one boundary of the emerging Kensington New Town, built between 1837 and about 1843. The western section of Gloucester Road between Kynance Place and Southwell Gardens, was developed from 1862 to 1879. Stabling for the houses was provided in mews, including Kynance Mews, whose arched entrance from Gloucester Road remains as a listed building.

A majority of the freeholds adjacent to Gloucester Road, south of the Cromwell Road, were owned by the Campbell family: Lord George and Lady Sybil Campbell (son and daughter-in-law of George Campbell, 8th Duke of Argyll) held the estates in the early twentieth century. Their only son, Ivar Campbell, was killed in action in World War I. The Campbell estates were sold in the early 1960s, following the deaths of his sisters, to satisfy inheritance taxes.

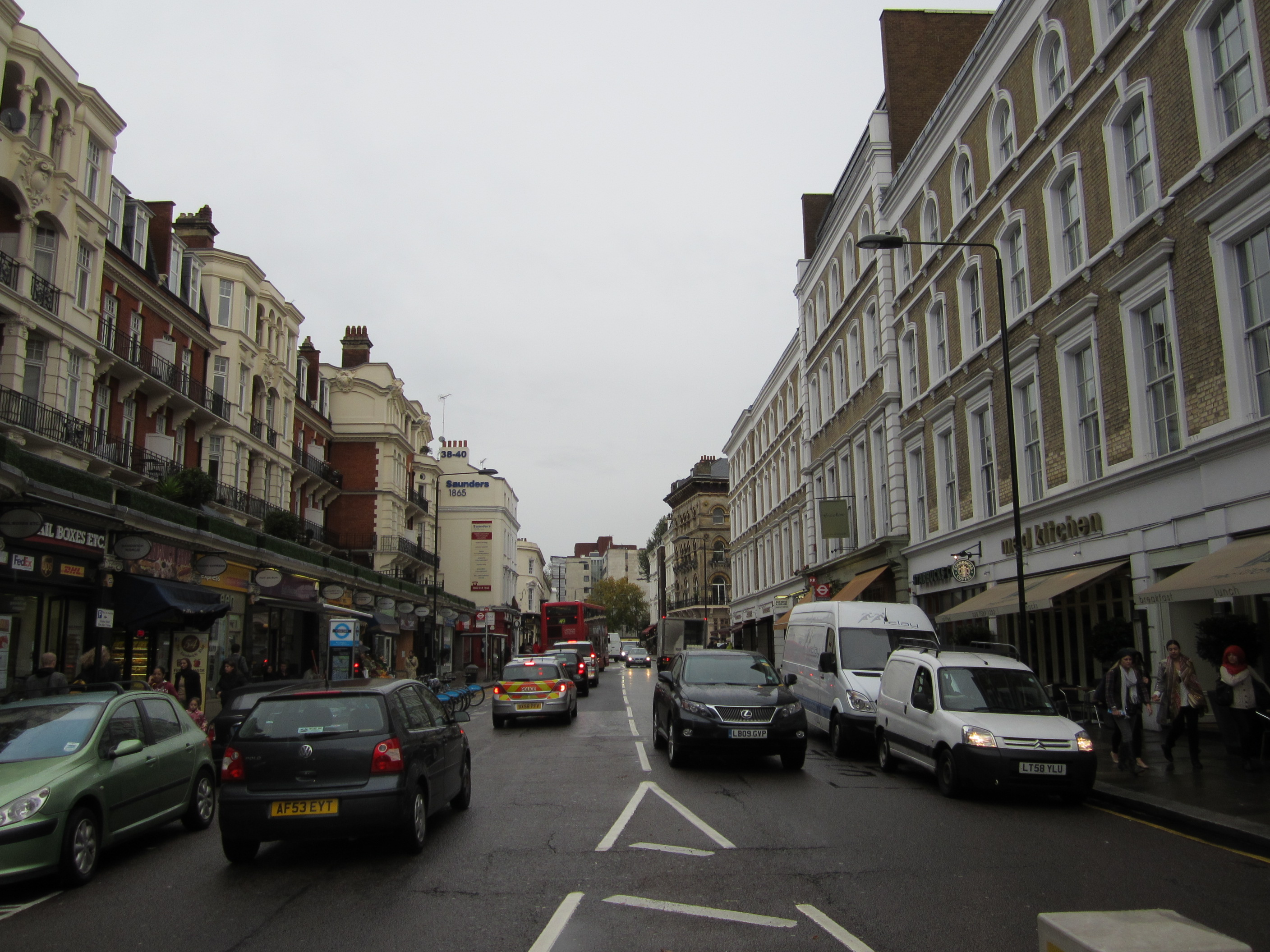
Looking north along Gloucester Road from near its intersection with Elvaston Place

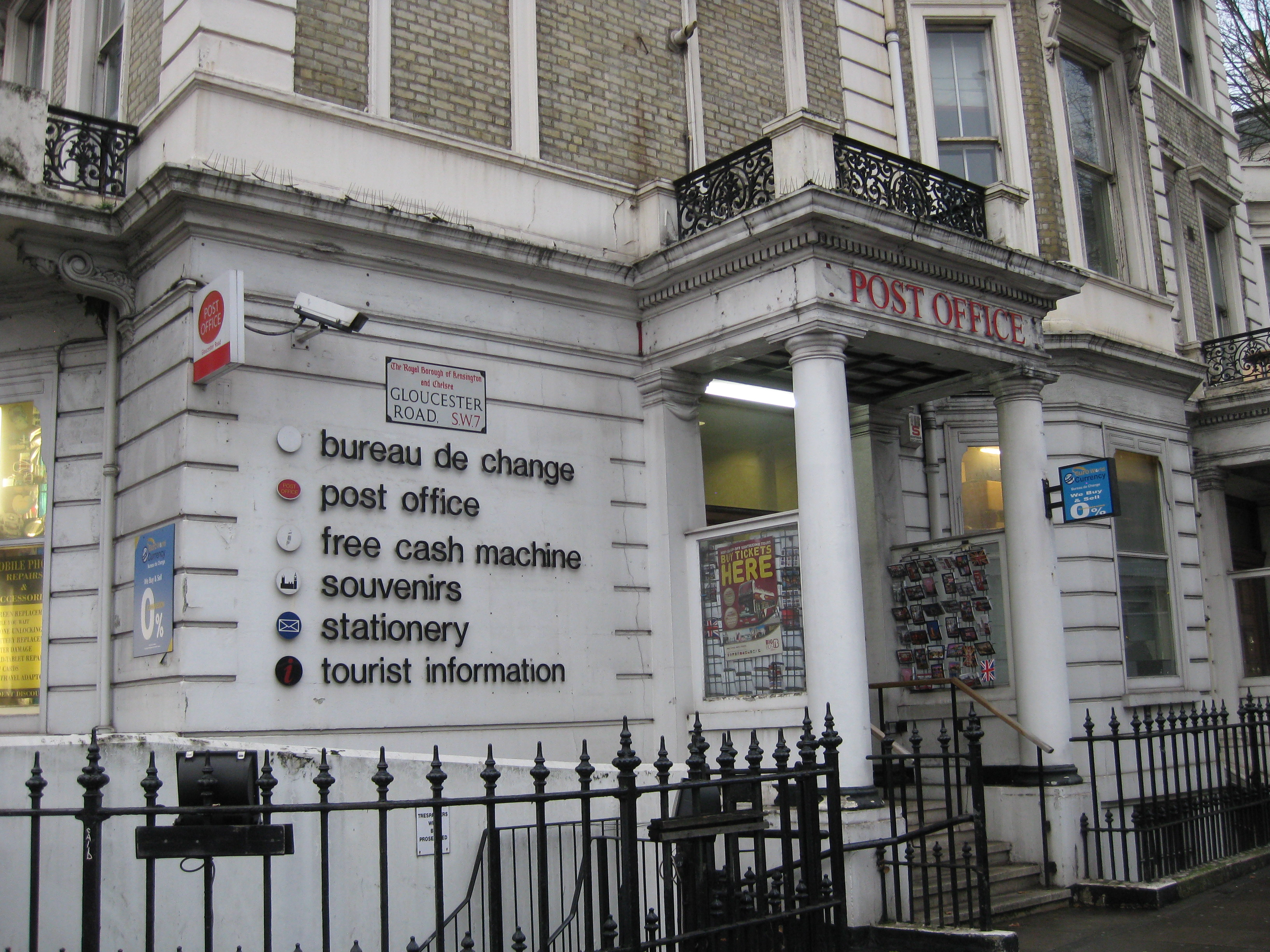
Gloucester Road Post Office

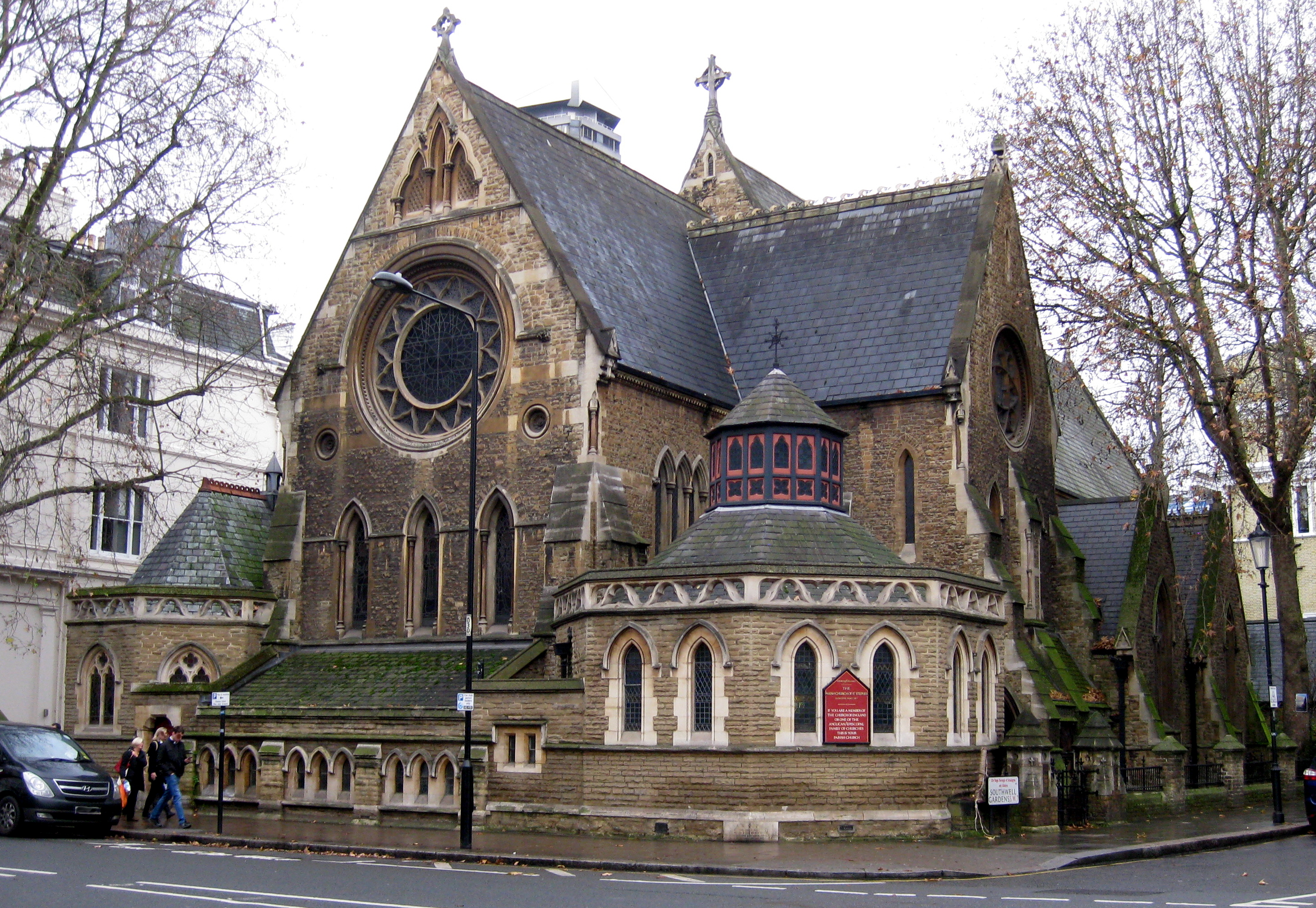
St Stephen's, Gloucester Road

== Other Gloucester Roads in London ==
There are 21 other streets in London with the name "Gloucester Road". Addresses at these streets need to be distinguished by area names or postcodes.

- Gloucester Road, Acton
- Gloucester Road, Belvedere
- Gloucester Road, Clay Hill
- Gloucester Road, Croydon
- Gloucester Road, Ealing
- Gloucester Road, Edmonton
- Gloucester Road, Feltham
- Gloucester Road, Hampton
- Gloucester Road, Hounslow
- Gloucester Road, Kew
- Gloucester Road, Leyton
- Gloucester Road, Little Ilford
- Gloucester Road, New Barnet
- Gloucester Road, Norbiton
- Gloucester Road, North Harrow
- Gloucester Road, Romford
- Gloucester Road, Teddington
- Gloucester Road, Tottenham
- Gloucester Road, Walthamstow
- Gloucester Road, Wanstead
- Gloucester Road, Whitton
