= Joseph Peacock (architect) =

British architect

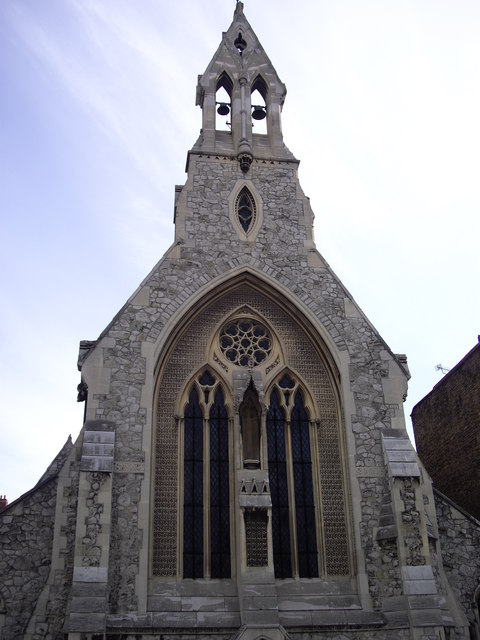
St Simon Zelotes, Milner Street, London (2009)

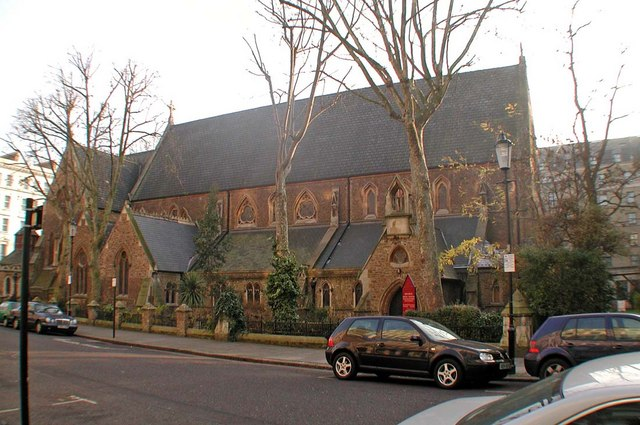
St Stephen's, Gloucester Road

Joseph Peacock FRIBA (1821 – 17 January 1893) was a British architect.

He became an Associate of the Royal Institute of British Architects (ARIBA) on 13 May 1850 and a fellow of the institute (FRIBA) on 19 December 1859. From the late 1850s, he was an "extremely individual" church architect. In 1868 his offices were at 15 Bloomsbury Square, London.

== Notable buildings ==
- St Simon Zelotes, Chelsea, London (1858–59)
- St Stephen's, Gloucester Road, London (1866–67)
- St James' Church, Malcolm Street, Derby (1867)
- St Thomas' Church, Derby (1881)
- St Benet and All Saints Church, Kentish Town, London (1884–5; replaced 1928)
- Holy Cross Church, St Pancras, London (1887–88)
