= Thomas Hill (archdeacon) =

Archdeacon of Derby (died 1875)

Thomas Hill was Archdeacon of Derby from 1847 to 1873.

Hill was educated at Trinity College, Cambridge. He was ordained deacon in 1811 and priest in 1812. He was vicar of Badgeworth from 1821 to 1847 (Crockford's Clerical Directory, 1865 edition).

He died on 14 September 1875. St Thomas' Church, Derby was built in his memory.

== Notes ==
Church of England titles
| Preceded by Walter Shirley | Archdeacon of Derby; 1843–1873 | Succeeded by Edward Balston |
