= Brattishing =

In architecture, brattishing or brandishing is a decorative cresting which is found at the top of a cornice or screen, parapet or the ridge of a roof. The design is typically repetitive and may derives from leaves, flowers, spears or crosses. Brattishing is vulnerable to weathering and damage and is formed in a range of materials: stone, terracotta, leadwork, carved wood and cast iron among them.
