= British Institute of Organ Studies =

British charity for pipe organs

- Abbreviation: BIOS
- Formation: 1976
- Legal status: Registered charity 283936
- Purpose: Pipe organs in the UK
- Region served: UK
- Chair of Trustees: Alan Thurlow
- Website: www.bios.org.uk

The British Institute of Organ Studies (BIOS) is a British organisation and registered charity which aims to promote study and appreciation of all aspects of the pipe organ. Further, it acts as a lobbying body to raise awareness of organ issues with appropriate statutory bodies. Membership is open to all.

== Aims ==
The aims of BIOS are

- To promote objective, scholarly research into the history of the organ and its music in all its aspects, and, in particular, into the organ and its music in Britain.
- To conserve the sources and materials for the history of the organ in Britain, and to make them accessible to scholars.
- To work for the preservation and, where necessary, the faithful restoration of historic organs in Britain.
- To encourage an exchange of scholarship with similar bodies and individuals abroad, and to promote, in Britain, a greater appreciation of historical overseas schools of organ-building.

BIOS publishes a quarterly Reporter newsletter and magazine and a yearly Journal. Both contain articles on organ history, the Journal hoping to attract mature studies, the Reporter offering a place for exposure of interim or conjectural work.

== National Pipe Organ Register ==
BIOS is also responsible for the National Pipe Organ Register (NPOR), which aims to catalogue all British pipe organs in a database. The database is available for searching free of charge on the internet.

=== History of the NPOR ===
The National Pipe Organ Register was begun by Peter le Huray and Mike Sayers in 1991. It was supported from 1992 to 1997 by the British Academy and by the British Institute of Organ Studies. Support for 1998 and 1999 was provided by the Pilgrim Trust.

For many years, the NPOR resided on a computer system in the University of Cambridge provided by the Thriplow Charitable Trust. In 2009 it was transferred to the IT Department of the Royal College of Music in London but returned to Emmanuel College in Cambridge in 2013. Editing continues to be done by a team of volunteer editors, now managed by Andrew Macintosh of the Royal College of Organists.

The project is guided by members of the Council of the British Institute of Organ Studies.

=== Historic Organ Certificates ===
BIOS issues Historic Organ Certificates as follows:

- Grade I for organs of outstanding historic and musical importance in essentially original condition.
- Grade II* for organs which are good representatives of the work of their builder, in substantially original condition.
- Grade II for organs which, whilst not unaltered, nevertheless contain important historic material.

A Certificate of Recognition identifies the presence of by individual elements of important historic material in an organ.

== British Organ Archive ==
The British Organ Archive, accumulated by BIOS, is held at the Cadbury Research Library, University of Birmingham.

== See also ==
- List of pipe organs
