= Railway war memorials in the United Kingdom =

Railway war memorials are memorials dedicated to railway company employees killed in war. Some were commissioned by the railway companies while others were commissioned on behalf of the employees. Such memorials were first erected after the Second Boer War (1899–1902), though the vast majority appeared after the First World War. Over 400 railway war memorials are known to exist in Britain, ranging from paper rolls of honour to imposing stone monuments. Some have been destroyed or lost through multiple changes in ownership or redevelopment of their surroundings. The Railway Heritage Trust and Network Rail maintain a database of the known surviving memorials.

== Second Boer War ==
The Second Boer War (1899–1902, also known as the South African War) was one of Britain's first wars to make extensive use of railways. It was also the first war to prompt a large wave of monuments dedicated to the memory of fallen soldiers, as opposed to victory monuments or memorials to commanders which had been common before. Few survive, but one highly visible example is the bronze plaques on platform 1 at Derby railway station, which list men from the Midland Railway killed in South Africa.

== First World War ==
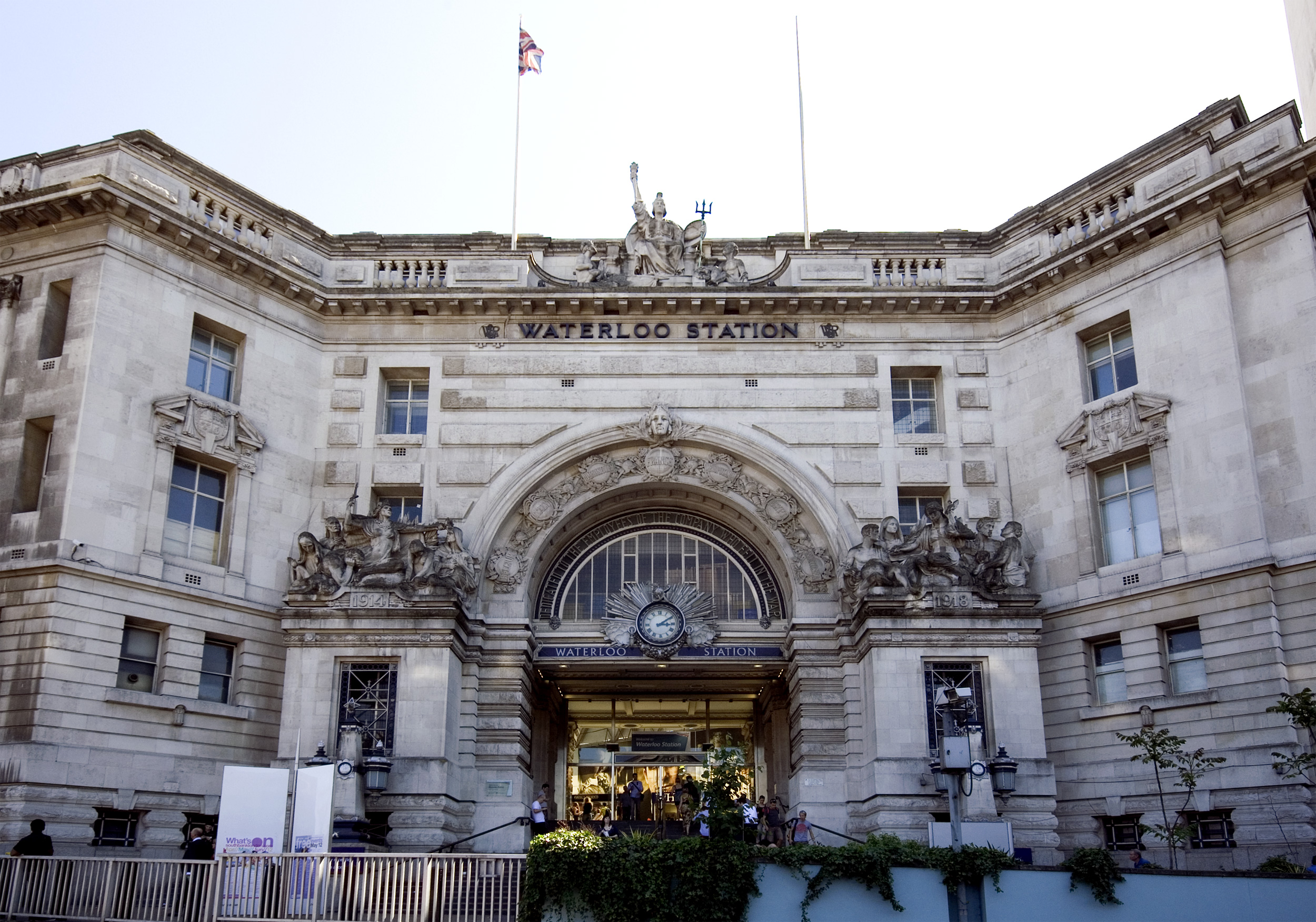
The Victory Arch over the main entrance at London Waterloo

The First World War produced casualties on an unprecedented scale. Thousands of railwaymen joined the armed forces, to the point that railway companies were forced to limit the number of men leaving. The railways themselves were placed under government control and entirely devoted to the war effort. Modern estimates are that almost 200,000 railwaymen fought in the war, and that over 21,000 of them were killed. During the war, several railway companies named locomotives after war heroes, including Marshal Joseph Joffre (commander of French forces), Charles Fryatt (captain of a railway-owned ship who was executed by the Germans), and Edith Cavell (a nurse executed for helping to release prisoners of war). Many companies also kept a paper roll of honour, listing employees who had left for the forces or who had been killed. The Midland Railway, a third of whose workforce enlisted or were conscripted, produced a pamphlet giving details of its employees who had joined up by December 1914; after the end of the war, it published a book of remembrance honouring its employees who had been killed.

Following the war, several railway companies chose to erect large architectural or sculptural war memorials. Surviving documents suggest that the railway companies discussed the matter of commemoration between them, though no consistent theme emerged. Arguably the most elaborate is the Victory Arch at London Waterloo station, built by the London & South Western Railway in memory of 585 of its employees killed in the war. Other prominent memorials include the Midland's cenotaph in its home town of Derby and the North Eastern Railway's memorial outside its head office in York, both designed by the renowned architect Sir Edwin Lutyens, and the London and North Western Railway's obelisk by the company architect outside Euston station. The Great Western Railway commissioned Charles Sargeant Jagger, a veteran of the war, for its memorial, a statue of a soldier reading a letter from home. The Great Central Railway's memorial to its dead of the First World War was erected outside Sheffield Victoria station and unveiled in 1922. The memorial erected by the Great Eastern Railway took the form of a large marble memorial plaque at Liverpool Street station in London.

Name	Railway company	Image	Location	Date unveiled	Type	Notes
Great Northern Railway War Memorial	Great Northern Railway		London Kings Cross	10 June 1920	Wall tablet	Unveiled by: Douglas Haig
Metropolitan Railway War Memorial	Metropolitan Railway		Baker Street tube station	11 November 1920	Wall tablet	Designer: Charles W. Clark; Unveiled by: Clarendon Hyde
London, Brighton and South Coast Railway War Memorial	London, Brighton and South Coast Railway		London Bridge station	5 October 1921	Wall tablet	Unveiled by: Charles Colin Macrae
London and North Western Railway War Memorial	London and North Western Railway		London Euston	21 October 1921	Monument	Architect: Reginald Wynn Owen; Unveiled by: Douglas Haig
Caledonian Railway War Memorial	Caledonian Railway		Glasgow	15 November 1921	Wall tablet	Unveiled by: Francis Davies
Midland Railway War Memorial	Midland Railway		Derby	15 December 1921	Monument	Architect: Edwin Lutyens; Unveiled by: Charles Booth
Lancashire and Yorkshire Railway War Memorial	Lancashire and Yorkshire Railway		Manchester	14 February 1922	Wall tablet	Architect: Henry Shelmerdine; Unveiled by: Douglas Haig
Glasgow and South Western Railway War Memorial	Glasgow and South Western Railway		Ayr	17 February 1922	Wall tablet	Designer: Robert Lorimer; Unveiled by: Douglas Haig
North British Railway War Memorial	North British Railway		Edinburgh	12 March 1922	Wall tablet	Construction: Charles Henshaw; Unveiled by: Duke of Buccleuch
London and South Western Railway War Memorial	London and South Western Railway		London Waterloo	21 March 1922	Arch	Architect: James Robb Scott; Unveiled by: Queen Mary
Great Eastern Railway War Memorial	Great Eastern Railway		London Liverpool Street	22 June 1922	Wall tablet	Construction: Farmer & Brindley; Unveiled by: Henry Wilson
Great Central Railway War Memorial	Great Central Railway		Sheffield	9 August 1922	Monument	Architect: Thomas Edward Collcutt; Unveiled by: Douglas Haig
Dover Marine War Memorial	South Eastern and Chatham Railway		Dover	28 October 1922	Statue	Sculptor: W. C. H. King; Unveiled by: Cosmo Bonsor
Great Western Railway War Memorial	Great Western Railway		London Paddington	11 November 1922	Statue	Architect: Thomas S. Tait; Sculptor: Charles Sargeant Jagger; Unveiled by: Viscount Churchill
North Eastern Railway War Memorial	North Eastern Railway		York	14 June 1924	Monument	Architect: Edwin Lutyens; Unveiled by: Herbert Plumer
Underground Electric Railways Company of London War Memorial	Underground Electric Railways Company of London	not on public display image after unveiling	Westminster	10 June 1925	Statue and panels	Unveiled by: William Robertson

As well as the erection of memorials, a service of remembrance to railwaymen killed in the war, attended by King George V and over 7,000 people, was held on 14 May 1919 in St Paul's Cathedral. A centenary memorial service was held in Southwark Cathedral on 6 November 2019.

== Second World War ==
Far fewer memorials were built after the Second World War. By that time, most railway companies had been amalgamated into the Big Four in 1923. The railway network suffered greatly from over-use and under-investment during the Second World War and the Big Four were nationalised to form British Railways in 1948. In many cases, the names of the dead from the Second World War were added to the memorials for the first.
