= London and North Western Railway War Memorial =

War memorial outside Euston Station, London

- United Kingdom
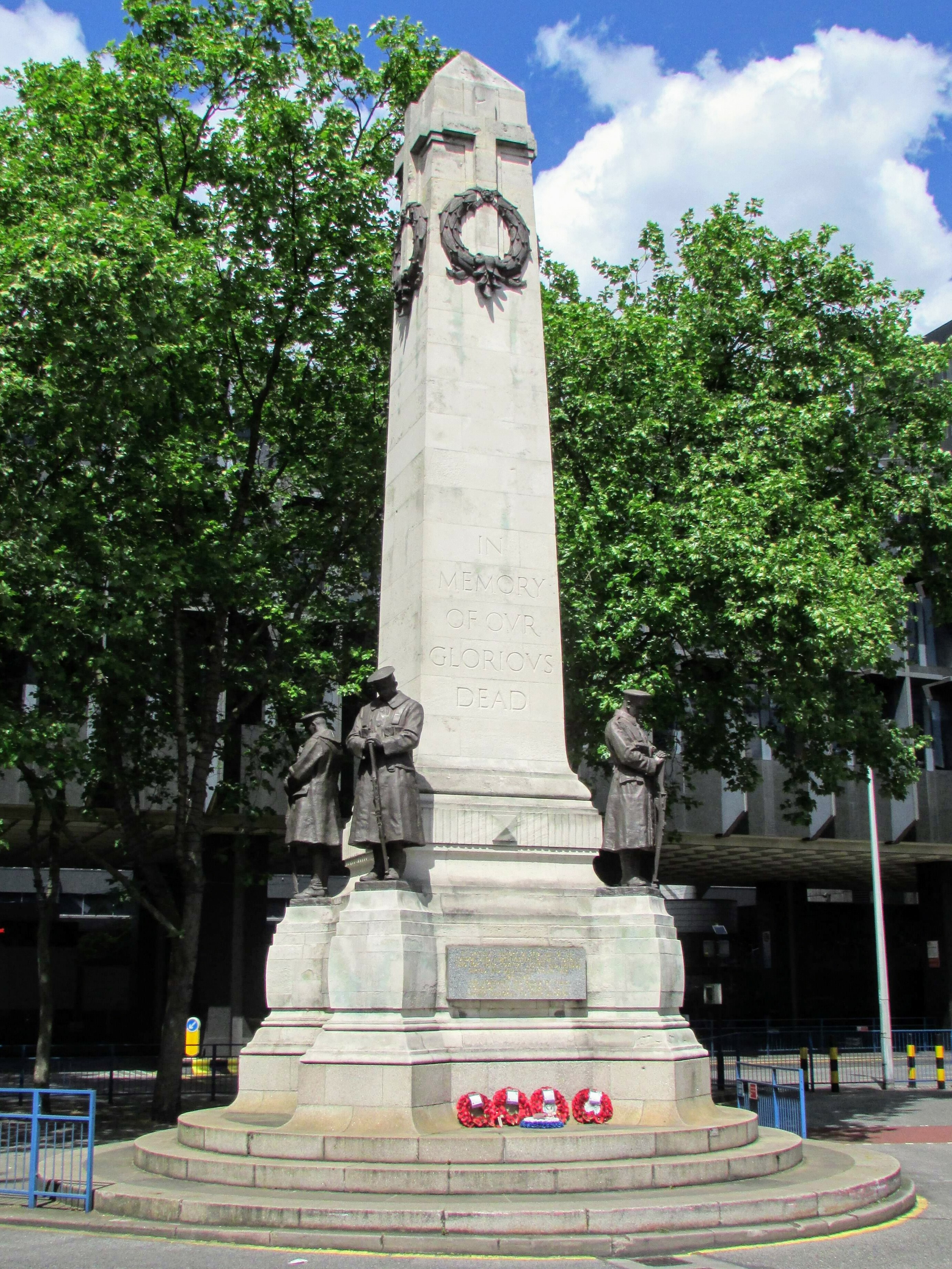
- For employees of the London and North Western Railway killed in the First World War
- Unveiled: 21 October 1921
- Location: 51°31′38.1″N 0°07′57.2″W; Euston railway station, London
- Designed by: Reginald Wynn Owen
- IN MEMORY OF OUR GLORIOUS DEAD

Listed Building – Grade II*
- Designated: 11 January 1999
- Reference no.: 1342044

The London and North Western Railway War Memorial is a First World War memorial located outside Euston station in London, England. The memorial was designed by Reginald Wynn Owen, architect to the London and North Western Railway (LNWR), and commemorates employees of the LNWR who were killed in the First World War. Some 37,000 LNWR employees left to fight in the war—around a third of the company's workforce—of whom over 3,000 were killed. As well as personnel, much of the company's infrastructure was turned over to the war effort. Of the £12,500 cost of the memorial, £4,000 was contributed by the employees and the company paid the remainder.

The memorial consists of a single 13-metre (43-foot) tall obelisk on a pedestal. At the top, on each side, is a cross in relief and a bronze wreath. At the four corners of the base are four over-life-size statues of military figures—an artilleryman, an infantryman, a sailor, and an airman. The memorial was unusual among those from the First World War in featuring an airman so prominently.

The memorial was unveiled on 21 October 1921. Over 8,000 people attended the ceremony, mostly LNWR employees and their families, including three who earned the Victoria Cross in the war. Tensions remained following a strike two years earlier and the speeches focused on patriotism and duty, encouraging the workers to follow the example of their dead comrades. The memorial and two entrance lodges are all that remain of the former Euston station complex, the station having been rebuilt in the 1960s. An office building was erected between the memorial and the station in the 1970s, obscuring the view of it from the station entrance. The memorial is a grade II* listed building.

== Background ==
The London and North Western Railway (LNWR) was one of the largest railway companies, and one of the largest private-sector organisations, in Britain in the early 20th century. During the First World War (1914–1918), it turned much of Crewe Works, its main engineering facility, over to the war effort. The skilled employees there began manufacturing artillery shells and other munitions, in addition to fulfilling a demand for new locomotives, wagons, and coaches to transport troops and equipment. Many railway workers were in reserved occupations and not liable to be conscripted. Prior to the introduction of conscription, over 4,000 LNWR employees had volunteered for the armed forces, 1,100 of them from Crewe Works. By the end of the war, 34 per cent of the railway's employees—37,742 men—had left to fight, of whom 3,719 were killed. Three employees were awarded the Victoria Cross (VC)—Lance Corporal John Alexander Christie, Private Ernest Sykes, and Private Wilfred Wood; the LNWR named a locomotive after each of them.

Thousands of war memorials were built across Britain following the war, including many by private companies to commemorate their employees who were killed in the war. The LNWR's memorial cost around £12,500, of which about £4,000 was donated by LNWR staff and the company paid the remainder. It was designed by the company's architect, Reginald Wynn Owen, and built by R. L. Boulton & Sons. Wynn Owen also designed a war memorial for the North London Railway, which was controlled by, and later absorbed into, the LNWR.

== Design ==
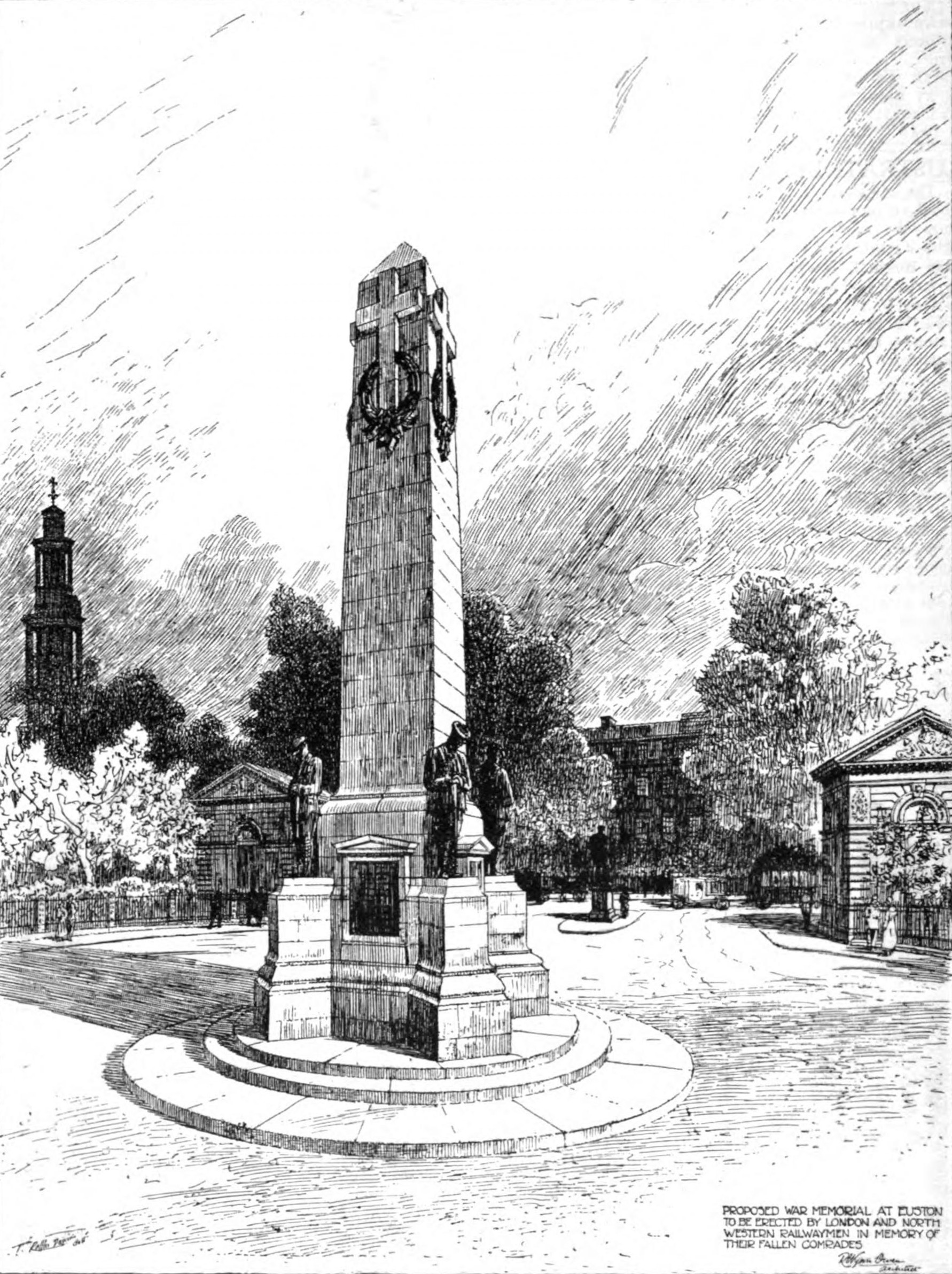
Wynn Owen's drawing for the memorial, published in The Builder in 1920, before the memorial was built. The station lodges can be seen in the background.

The memorial consists of a single obelisk, 13 metres (43 feet) high in Portland stone, which stands on a tall pedestal and a circular base of grey granite. At its foot, the obelisk is moulded to the base and decorated with a reed band. On each side of the obelisk, near the top, is a bronze wreath and a stone cross in relief. The only inscription on the obelisk is IN MEMORY OF OUR GLORIOUS DEAD on the south face (the front as one walks towards Euston station), though a granite tablet in front of the memorial contains the further inscription:

In grateful memory of 3719 men of the London and North-Western Railway Company who for their country, justice and freedom served and died in the Great War 1914–1919. This monument was raised by their comrades and the company as a lasting memorial to their devotion.

Further tablets were added later to commemorate casualties from the Second World War, by which time the LNWR had been merged into the London, Midland and Scottish Railway. Above the tablets is the inscription "Remember the men and women of the London Midland and Scottish Railway 1939–1945".

Buttresses protruding from the pedestal on four sides act as steps; on top of each is a bronze over-life-size statue. The four figures represent the infantry, artillery, Royal Navy, and the Royal Flying Corps (which was amalgamated to form the Royal Air Force in 1918), each statue standing with its head bowed in mourning, resting on an upturned rifle (reverse arms). The memorial is unusual amongst First World War memorials in featuring the fledgling air force so prominently. The figures were modelled by Ambrose Neale, chief artist at Boulton & Sons.

Although obelisks are not inherently associated with Christianity, Wynn Owen later said that he intended the crosses to symbolise the Christian ideals for which those commemorated had fought and died. The company's in-house magazine, the LNWR Gazette, also saw it as symbolising the unity of living and dead Christian believers. The Gazette praised the "simple grandeur of the structure [which] corresponds to the simplicity and grandeur of those to whom it is raised". Wynn Owen described the obelisk as "entirely devoid of ornament so that the eye is drawn up to the crowning element of the design [the crosses] without distraction". He was adamant that the memorial was to honour the dead and was not in any way a victory monument.

The four bronze statues by Ambrose Neale

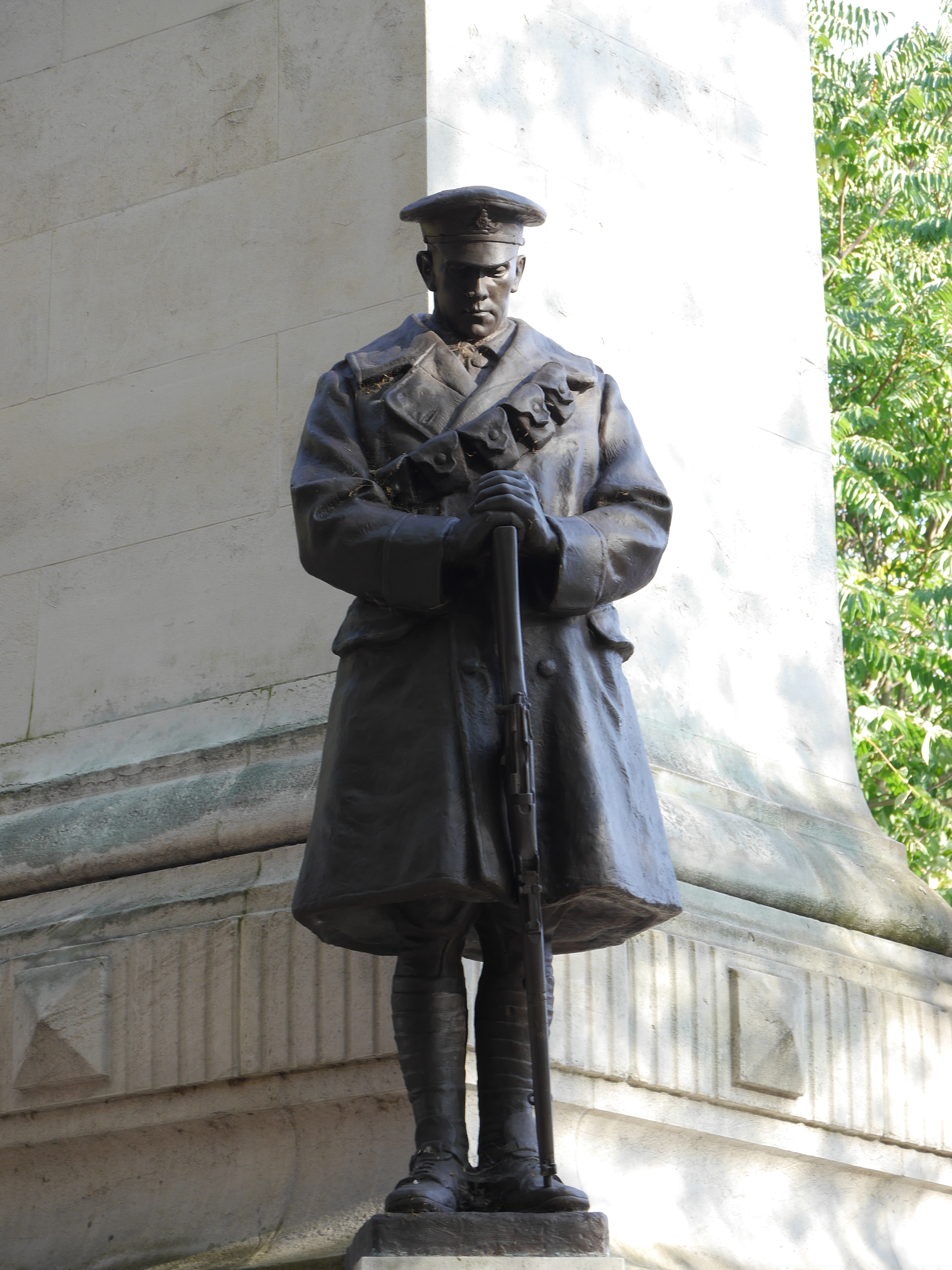
Artilleryman

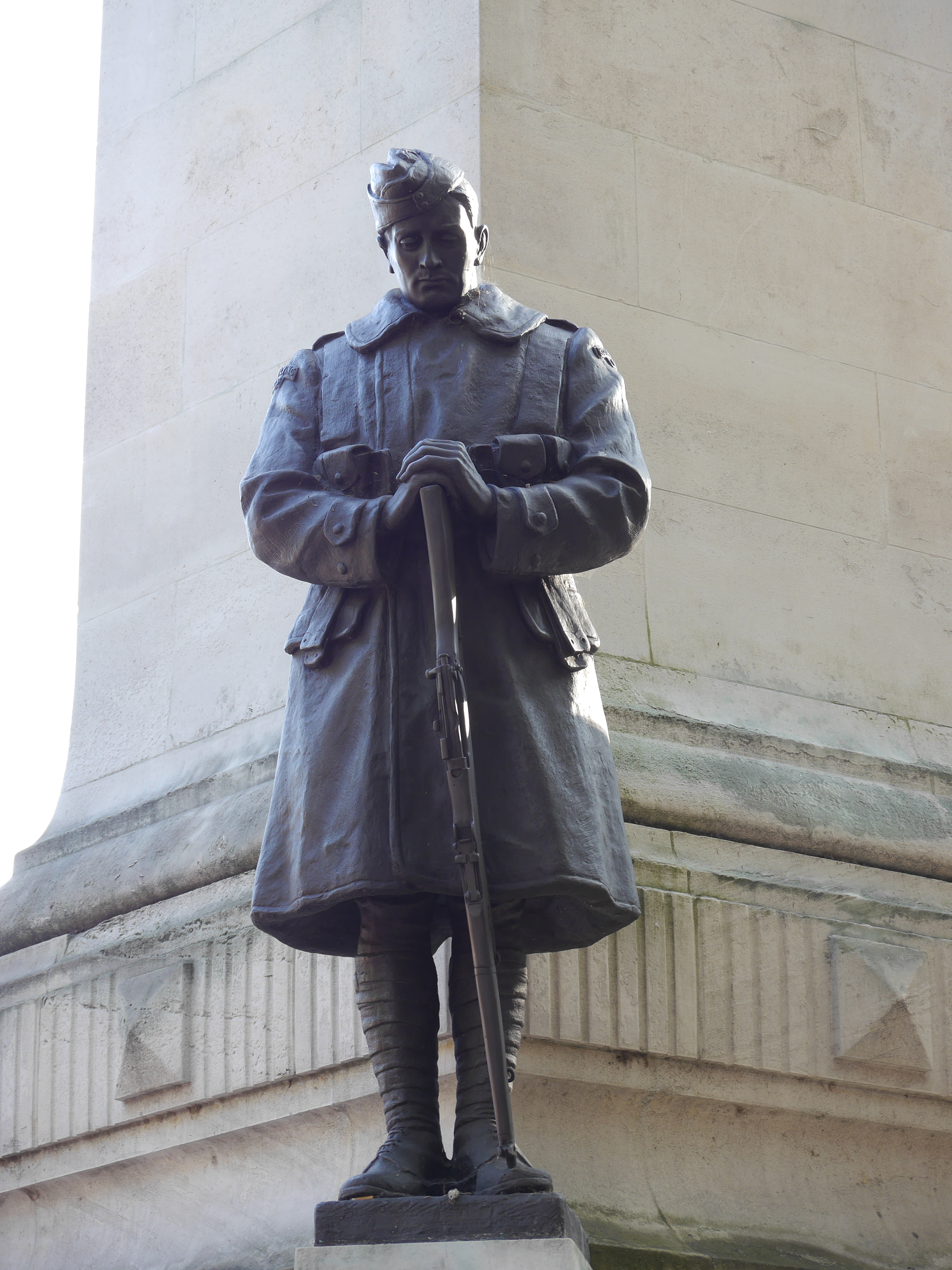
Airman

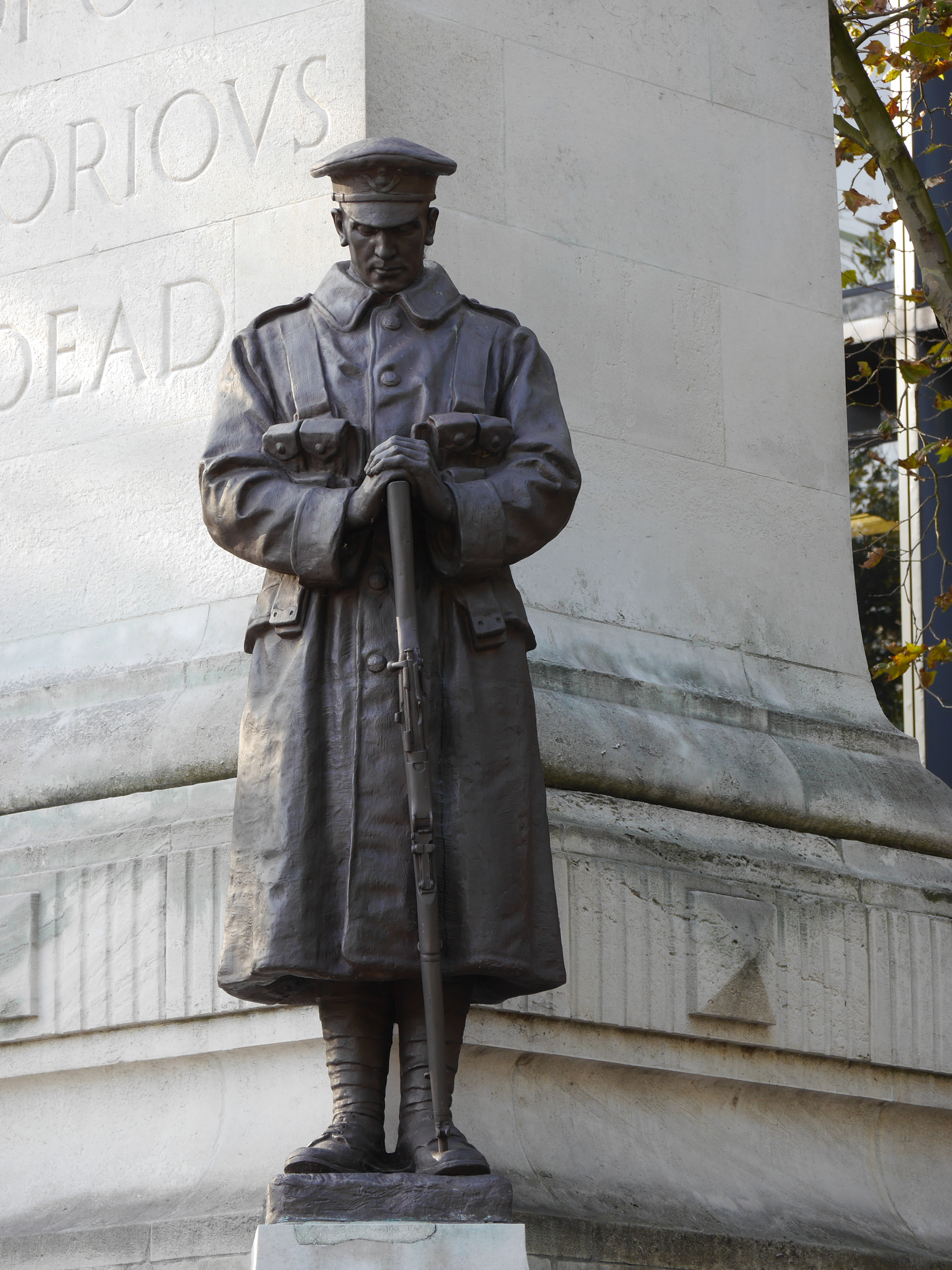
Infantryman

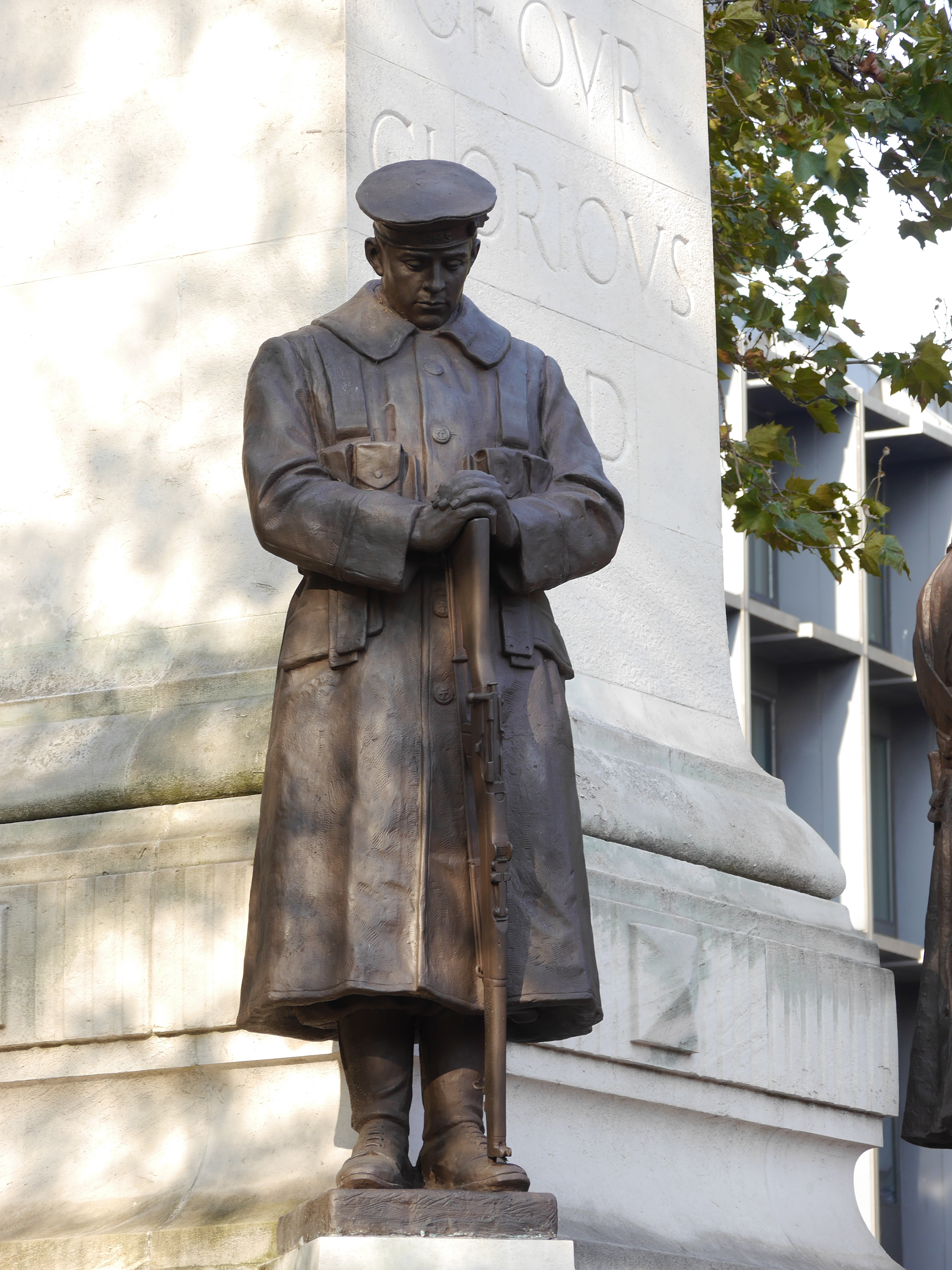
Sailor

== History ==
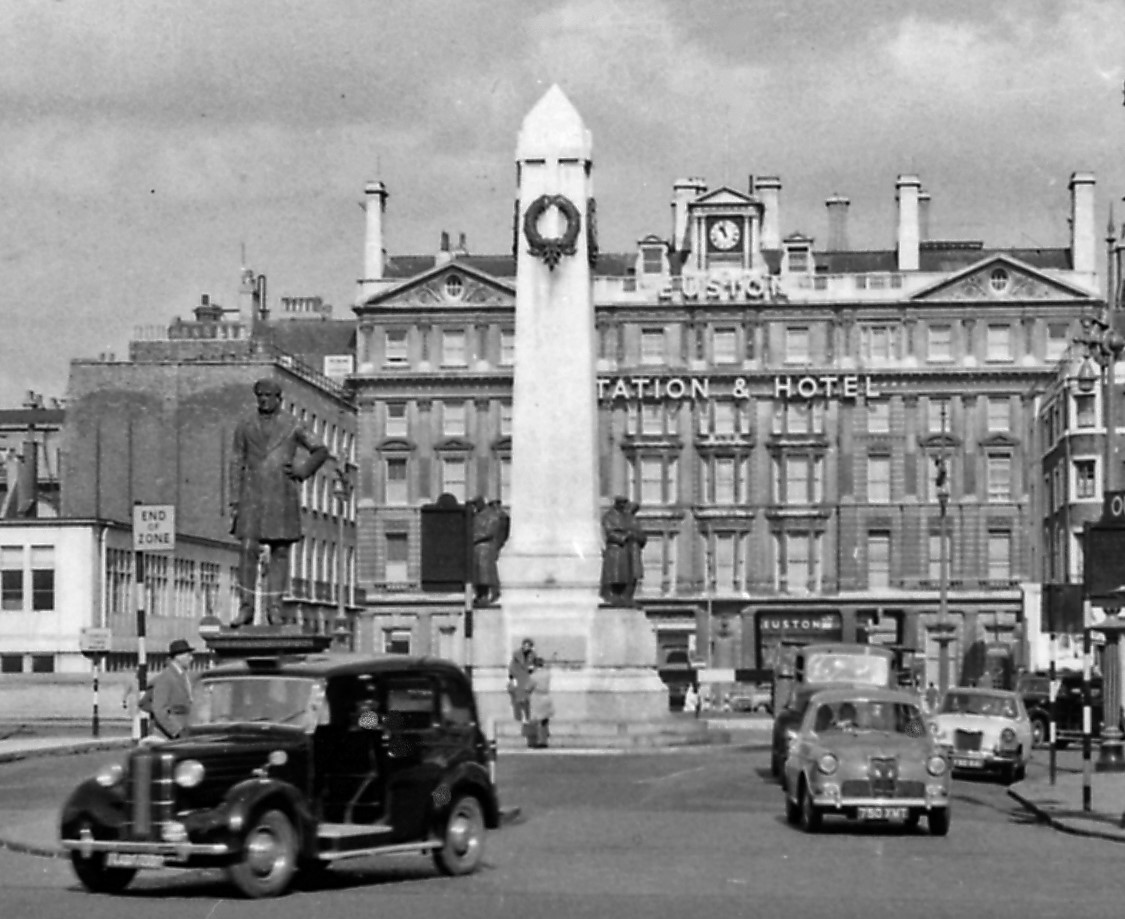
The memorial seen in the early 1960s, after the demolition of the Euston Arch and shortly before the redevelopment of the station

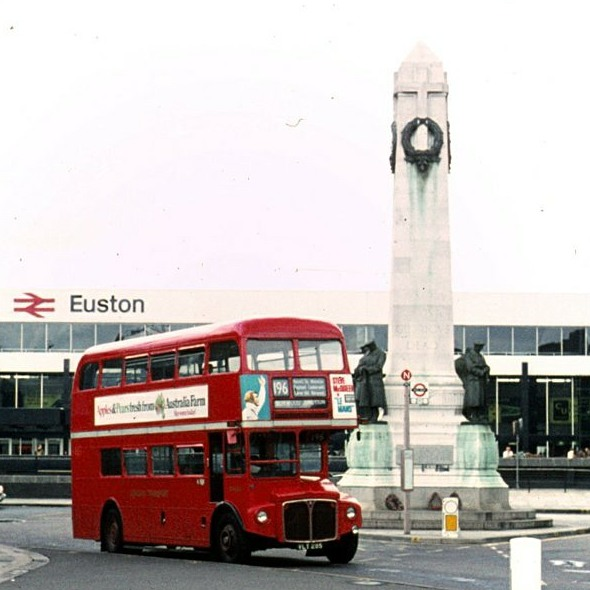
The memorial in 1971, after the rebuilding of the station but before the construction of the office building, with a Routemaster bus for scale

The LNWR memorial was unveiled at a ceremony on 21 October 1921. Field Marshal Douglas Haig, 1st Earl Haig, the commander of British forces on the Western Front during the war, presided. Haig gave a speech in which he praised the LNWR's contribution to the war effort and its "splendid conduct and loyal support throughout the great struggle". The Archbishop of Canterbury, Randall Davidson, gave a dedication. Among the other speakers were Ernest Sykes VC and the LNWR company chairman, Charles Lawrence. Christie and Wood, the LNWR's other two Victoria Cross recipients, were also present. The unveiling ceremony was possibly the largest for a railway company war memorial. Over 8,000 people attended, and the company laid on dedicated trains to bring employees and their relatives to London from across its network, including Crewe, Wolverton (home of another major works), Manchester and Leeds. Sykes laid the first wreath at the base of the obelisk, and other employees who had received military decorations formed a square between the memorial and the rest of the crowd.

Gabriel Koureas, an art historian, argued that the purpose of the grand unveiling ceremony was to erase "revolutionary feeling" among the work force and create a new sense of unity based on the official narrative of the war. In 1919, the National Union of Railwaymen (NUR) orchestrated a national strike of railway workers, which lasted over a week before the government largely conceded to the NUR's demands. The government had proposed to eliminate improved pay and conditions which railway workers were granted during the war. The strikers were condemned in the press as revolutionaries and anarchists, to which the union took great offence, pointing out that many of its members had only recently returned from the war. Although the strike was not explicitly mentioned at the unveiling ceremony, tensions were still high. Both Haig and Lawrence stressed the heroism and selflessness of the dead in their speeches and the importance of following their example in life. Haig referred to the "burden these men bore so bravely", and Lawrence told the crowd:

We, the survivors, should dedicate ourselves anew to the service of our country, and that, especially in our character of employers and employees, we should strive to act in a spirit of mutual sympathy, of mutual forbearance, of absolute rectitude of purpose, and even of magnanimity if we wish to assist in the binding up of the wounds of our common country, and so prove ourselves worthy of the sacrifice these men have made for us.

Prior to the unveiling, Wynn Owen wrote to Lawrence, expressing his thoughts on the meaning and symbolism of the memorial, and hoping that Lawrence or Haig would explain them at the ceremony. Lawrence wrote back that such explanation was "neither necessary nor desirable". To smooth industrial relations, Lawrence preferred to focus on the company's war record and the actions of railwaymen who had received decorations. Koureas suggested that Sykes, wearing his Victoria Cross, exemplified the "ideal working-class man: unselfish, patriotic, and obedient".

As well as the obelisk at Euston, the LNWR built several smaller memorials at other major stations and works on its network, including two at Birmingham New Street railway station, one of which survives. The company also produced a paper Roll of Honour, a copy of which was presented to the nearest living relative of each of the dead. The volume listed each of the 3,719 dead and included their railway occupation, military rank, and any decorations earned. It included a dedicated section listing recipients of the Victoria Cross and contained a full-page drawing of the memorial.

The memorial's site was originally in the centre of Euston Square on the approach road to the station and on an axis with the Euston Arch, a grand ceremonial entrance built around the same time as the original station. In the 1960s, the square was redeveloped by British Rail, dramatically changing the view of the memorial. The classical station building and hotel were demolished and the station re-built in a modernist style. Controversially, the arch was also demolished, despite a campaign to save it. A new office building was erected in front of the station in the 1970s, obscuring the view of the memorial from the entrance.

The memorial is a grade II* listed building, first designated in 1999. Listed building status provides statutory protection from demolition or modification; grade II* is reserved for "particularly important buildings of more than special interest" and is applied to about 5.5 per cent of listings. The listing document describes the memorial as "an eloquent witness to the tragic impact of world events upon, and the sacrifices made by, the workforce of the LNWR, one of Britain's principal railway companies". It calls it "an imposing composition [...] of considerable quality", as well as noting its group value with the two station lodges in Euston Square Gardens, which frame the view of the memorial from Euston Road. Built in 1870, the lodges, along with the war memorial, were the only survivors of the 1960s redevelopment and are grade II listed buildings. As of 2021, maintenance of the memorial is the responsibility of Network Rail.

== See also ==
Other railway war memorials:

- Great Eastern Railway War Memorial, at Liverpool Street station
- Great Western Railway War Memorial, at Paddington station
- London, Brighton and South Coast Railway War Memorial, at London Bridge station
- North Eastern Railway War Memorial, in York
- Midland Railway War Memorial, in Derby

Lists:

- Grade II* listed buildings in Camden
- Grade II* listed war memorials in England
- List of public art in Camden
