= London, Brighton and South Coast Railway War Memorial =

War memorial in London Bridge station

Coordinates: 51.5046°N 0.0860°W

The London, Brighton and South Coast Railway War Memorial is a war memorial at London Bridge railway station that honours the employees of the London, Brighton & South Coast Railway who fought in World War I and World War II. Originally set in a brick wall, it was unveiled in 1922. It was framed with flat contemporary cladding panels when the station was redeveloped in the 2010s.

This memorial is one of three erected by the London, Brighton & South Coast Railway, with the other two installed at Brighton and London Victoria stations.

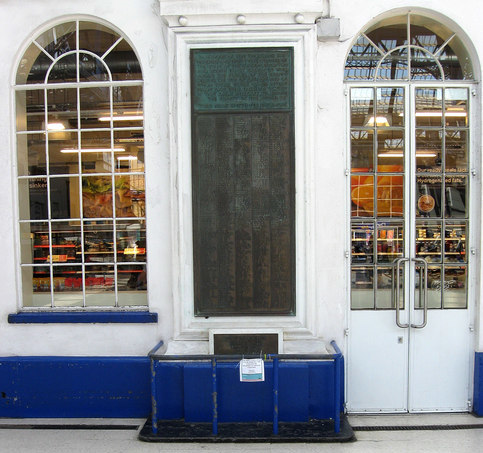
Brighton railway station in 2011

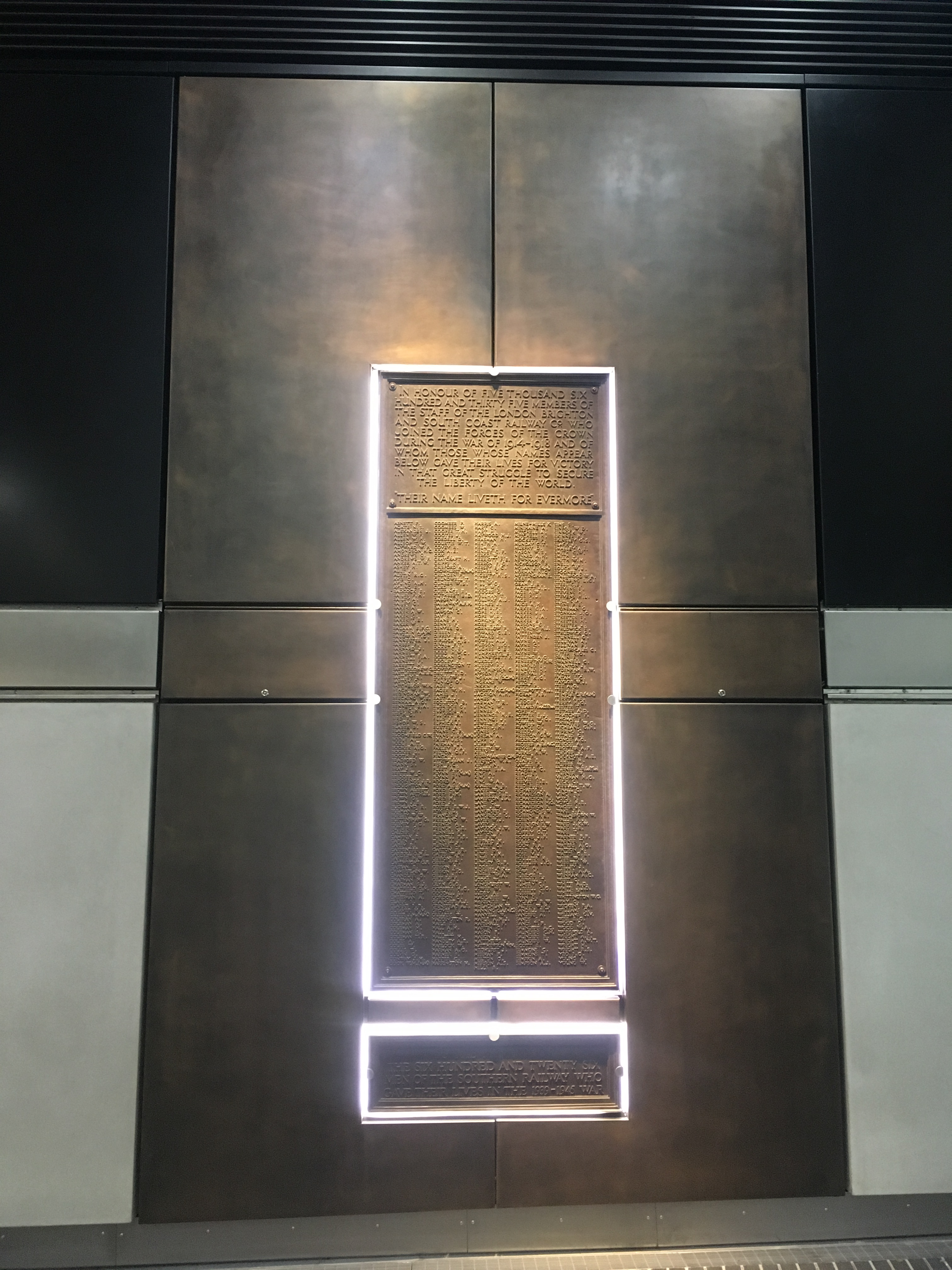
London Bridge railway station in 2017

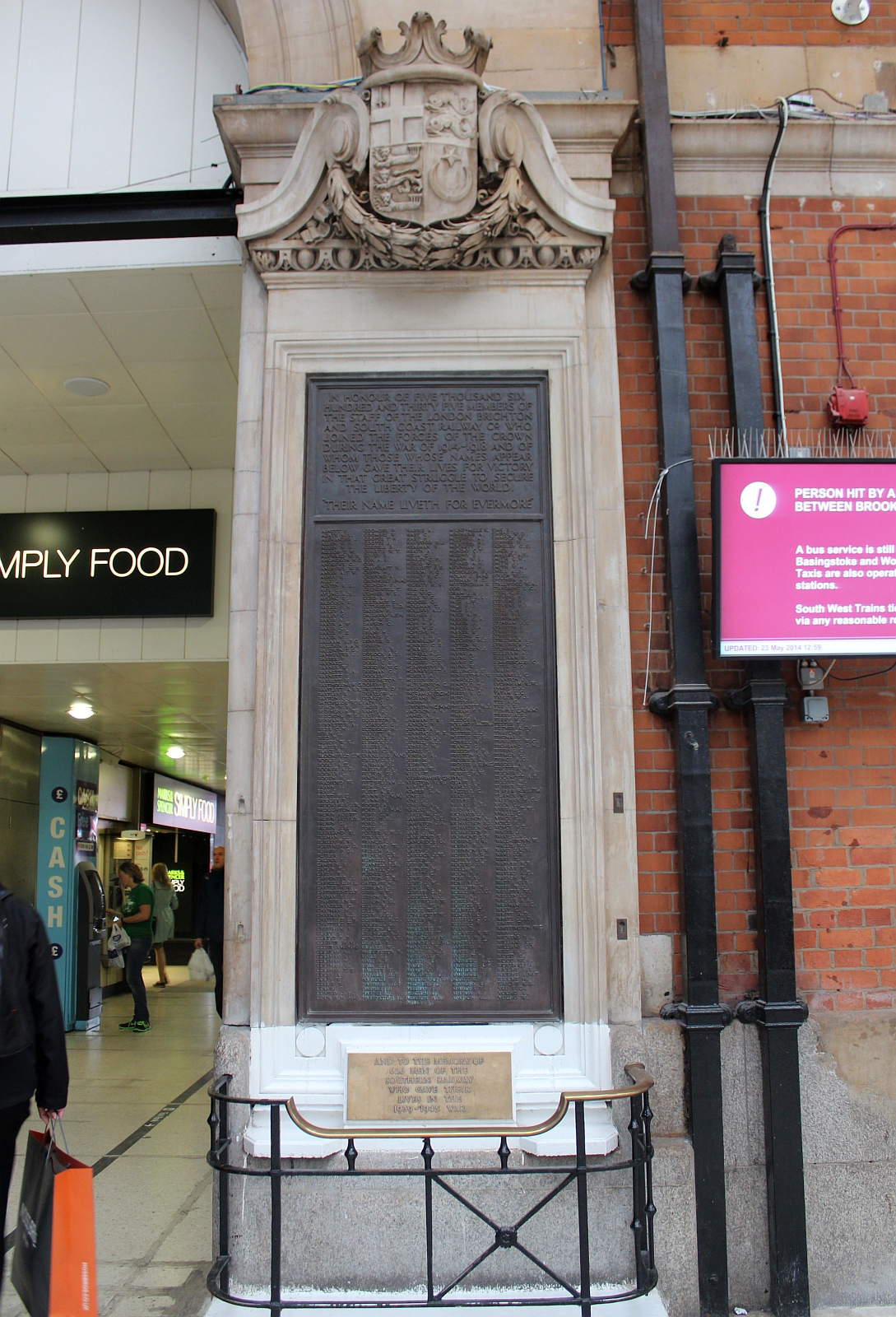
London Victoria railway station in 2014

== See also ==
Other railway war memorials:

- London and North Western Railway War Memorial, Euston station (to the north).
- Great Eastern Railway War Memorial, Liverpool Street station (to the north east).
- Great Western Railway War Memorial, Paddington station (to the west).
- North Eastern Railway War Memorial, York.
- Midland Railway War Memorial, Derby.
