= York City War Memorial =

Grade II* listed memorial in York, England

- United Kingdom
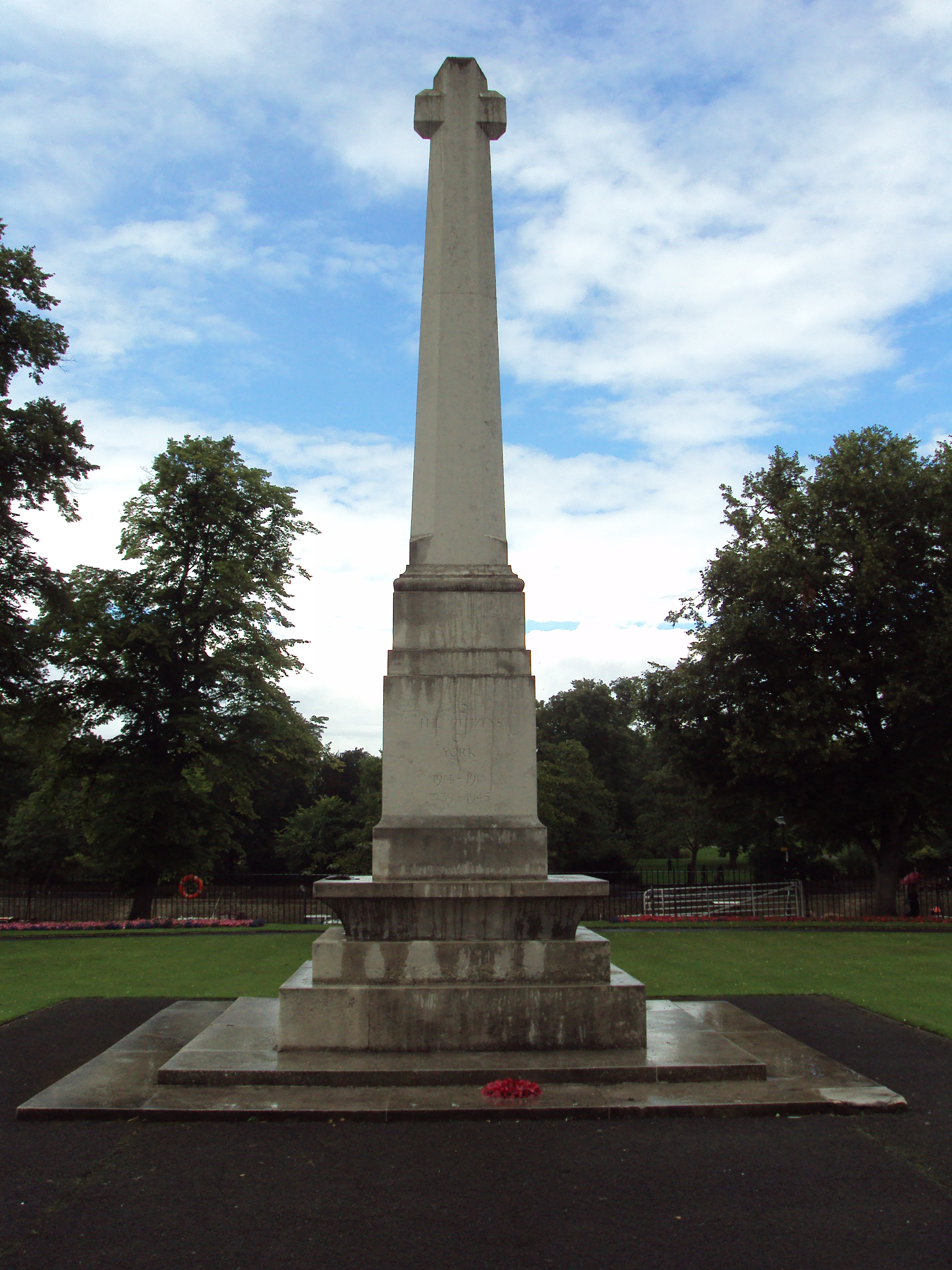
- For servicemen from York killed in the First World War
- Unveiled: 1925; 101 years ago
- Location: 53°57′35.7″N 01°05′22.4″W; Leeman Road, York, England
- Designed by: Sir Edwin Lutyens

Listed Building – Grade II*
- Official name: York City War Memorial in the War Memorial Garden
- Designated: 10 September 1970
- Reference no.: 1257512

The York City War Memorial is a First World War memorial designed by Sir Edwin Lutyens and located in York in the north of England. Proposals for commemorating York's war dead originated in 1919 but proved controversial. Initial discussions focused on whether a memorial should be a monument or take on some utilitarian purpose. Several functional proposals were examined until a public meeting in January 1920 opted for a monument. The city engineer produced a cost estimate and the war memorial committee engaged Lutyens, who had recently been commissioned by the North Eastern Railway (NER) to design their own war memorial also to be built in York.

Lutyens' first design was approved, but controversy enveloped proposals for both the city's and the NER's memorials. Members of the local community were concerned the memorials as planned were not aligned with York's existing architecture, especially as both were in close proximity to the ancient city walls, and that the NER's memorial would overshadow the city's. Continued public opposition forced the committee to abandon the proposed site in favour of one on Leeman Road just outside the walls, and Lutyens submitted a new design of a War Cross and Stone of Remembrance to fit the location. This design was scaled back to the cross alone due to a lack of funds.

Prince Albert, Duke of York (later King George VI), unveiled the memorial on 25 June 1925, six years after the memorial fund was opened. It consists of a stone cross 33 feet (10 metres) high on three stone blocks and a stone base, beneath which are two further blocks and two shallow steps. It sits in a memorial garden, with an entrance designed by Lutyens using the remaining funds for the memorial. The memorial itself is a grade II* listed building, having been upgraded when Lutyens' war memorials were designated a national collection in 2015. The piers and gate at the entrance to the garden are listed separately at grade II.

== Background ==
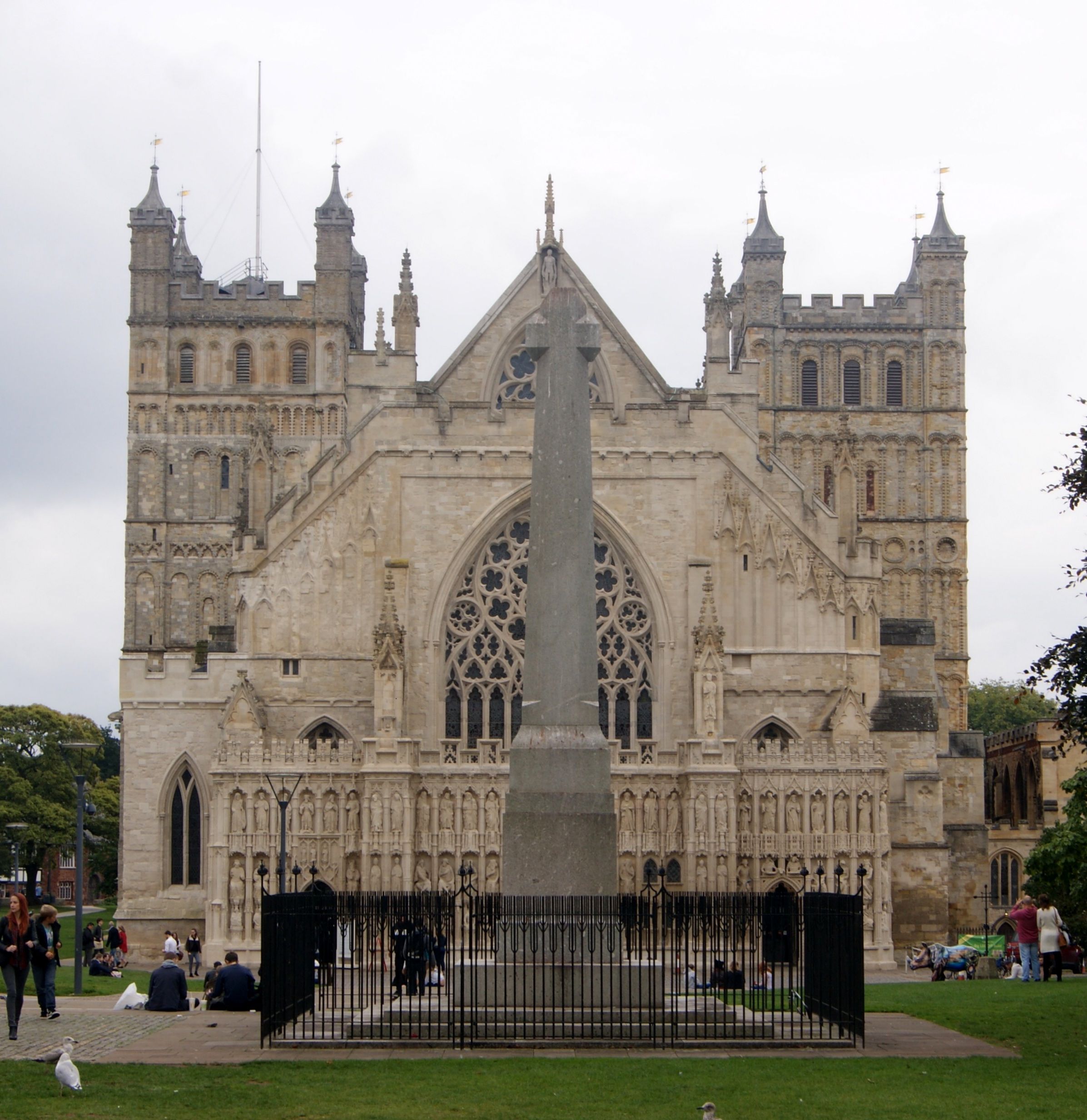
The Devon County War Memorial, outside Exeter Cathedral, was also designed by Lutyens and was unveiled in 1921. It and the York City memorial are unusual in being the only iterations of Lutyens' War Cross to stand in a city.

In the aftermath of the First World War, which saw over one million British Empire deaths, thousands of war memorials were built across Britain. Amongst the most prominent designers of memorials was architect Sir Edwin Lutyens, described by Historic England as "the leading English architect of his generation". Lutyens designed The Cenotaph in London, which became the focus for the national Remembrance Sunday commemorations; the Thiepval Memorial to the Missing, the largest British war memorial anywhere in the world; and the Stone of Remembrance, which appears in all large Commonwealth War Graves Commission cemeteries and in several of Lutyens' civic memorials. The York City Memorial was the fifteenth and final War Cross designed by Lutyens, all to a broadly similar design. Most were commissioned for villages—the Devon County War Memorial in Exeter is the only other example of a War Cross serving as a civic memorial in a city.

Proposals for a war memorial in York were mired in controversy from the outset. A war memorial committee was established after a council meeting in May 1919 and the committee opened a memorial fund for donations in August, but six years elapsed before the City War Memorial was unveiled. The first point of contention was one that arose in many communities when considering a war memorial. Some felt the war dead should be commemorated through a building with some community purpose rather than a purely decorative monument. Multiple ideas were put forward and the council tasked the war memorial committee with considering several proposals, including a new city hall and a convalescent home. The committee generated several ideas of its own including a new bridge over the River Ouse, homes for war widows, a maternity hospital, and several ideas for an educational institution. A series of public meetings produced many more ideas until a meeting on 14 January 1920, where a consensus was established in favour of a monument rather than any utilitarian proposal.

The committee requested the city engineer produce a design for a memorial garden with an archway and a cenotaph. The city engineer reported back with a design which he estimated would cost around £7,000, and the war memorial committee appointed Lutyens to oversee the project. Lutyens had recently been commissioned to design a memorial for the North Eastern Railway Company (NER) which was based in York and planned to erect its own memorial in the city dedicated to those of its staff who fought and died in the war.

== Inception ==
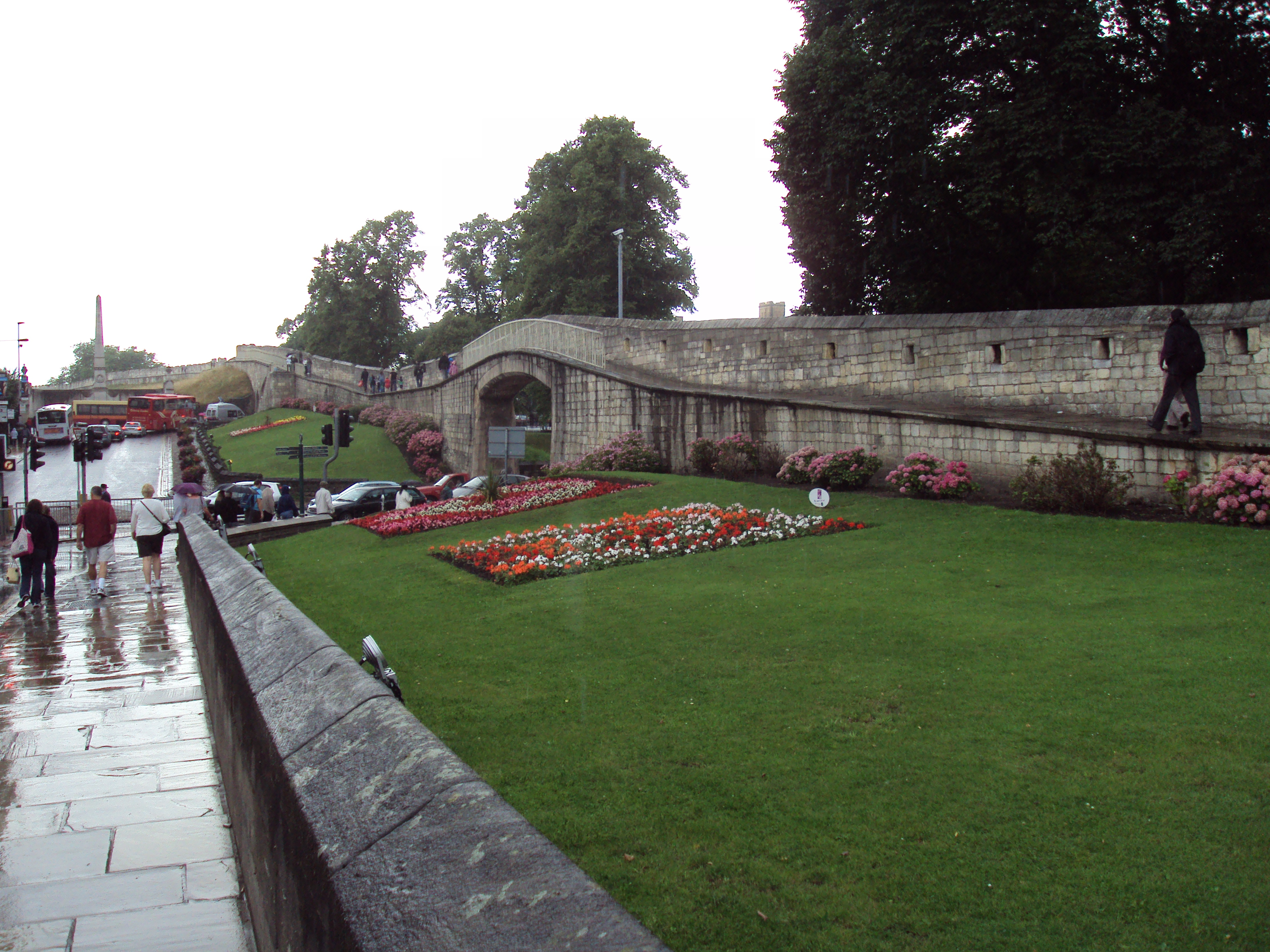
The section of York city walls near Lendal Bridge at approximately the original planned location of the City War Memorial; the North Eastern Railway Company's memorial can be seen in the background to the left.

The committee gave Lutyens a budget of £2,000 (1920). The architect visited York on 12 August 1920. Accompanied by the lord mayor and the city engineer, he reviewed nine potential sites for the memorial. His preference was for a former cholera burial ground just outside the city walls, but the committee opted for his second choice of a site inside the walls in the moat by Lendal Bridge, 100 yards (90 metres) from the proposed location for the NER's memorial. The committee asked Lutyens to submit a formal proposal, which they received eleven weeks later. The design consisted of Lutyens' Stone of Remembrance, complete with its characteristic base of three shallow steps, raised on a large podium taking it 18 feet (5.5 metres) off the ground. It was the only design for the Stone of Remembrance to treat it as an object of veneration—in all of Lutyens' other designs for the stone it functioned as an altar, albeit more symbolic than practical—and one of the most ambitious of all his war memorial projects. The committee endorsed the proposal on 24 June 1920, after which it was published in the local newspapers as part of a public consultation. It was eventually approved at a further public meeting on 25 November 1920.

Nonetheless, objections were raised after the approval. The York Archaeological Society (YAS) and the Yorkshire Architectural and York Archaeological Society (YAYAS) felt the scheme was not aligned with the existing architecture in the area (particularly York's ancient city walls) and it would obstruct views for pedestrians coming into the city from the York railway station. Other members of the community, including a local councillor, were concerned the city's memorial in its proposed location would be overshadowed by the railway company's, as the NER had granted Lutyens a budget of £20,000—ten times that allocated by the city—for which he had proposed a 54-foot (16-metre) obelisk and large screen wall. Given the proximity to the city walls (Lutyens' initial proposal for the NER abutted the walls) both the city's scheme and the NER's required the consent of the Ancient Monuments Board (later English Heritage and then Historic England). Charles Reed Peers, the board's chief inspector of ancient monuments, attended a meeting at the NER's offices on 8 July 1922 to hear representations for and against both schemes. He requested Lutyens make modification to the NER's memorial, but approved the city's, noting the proposed site was not part of the walls' rampart and had been created when Lendal Bridge was built in the mid 19th century.

Public opposition to the proposed site mounted even after the Ancient Monuments Board's approval, and the YAYAS continued to apply pressure, calling another public meeting—which it scheduled for 3 May 1923—forcing the war memorial committee to reconsider. The committee revisited a site on Leeman Road outside the city walls, which had originally been proposed in 1921. Lutyens sent his assistant Albert J. Thomas (an architect in his own right) to examine the site on 8 August 1923 and all parties agreed to it. By coincidence, the site was owned by the NER, which donated it to the city in a mark of gratitude for the good relations between the company and the city, the NER having recently been amalgamated into the London and North Eastern Railway. Lutyens submitted a revised design to account for the new location—a War Cross and a Stone of Remembrance—which would have cost almost £2,500. The scheme was scaled back to just the cross and the council undertook to conduct the work using its own staff in order to meet the £1,100 budget raised by public subscription.

== History and design ==
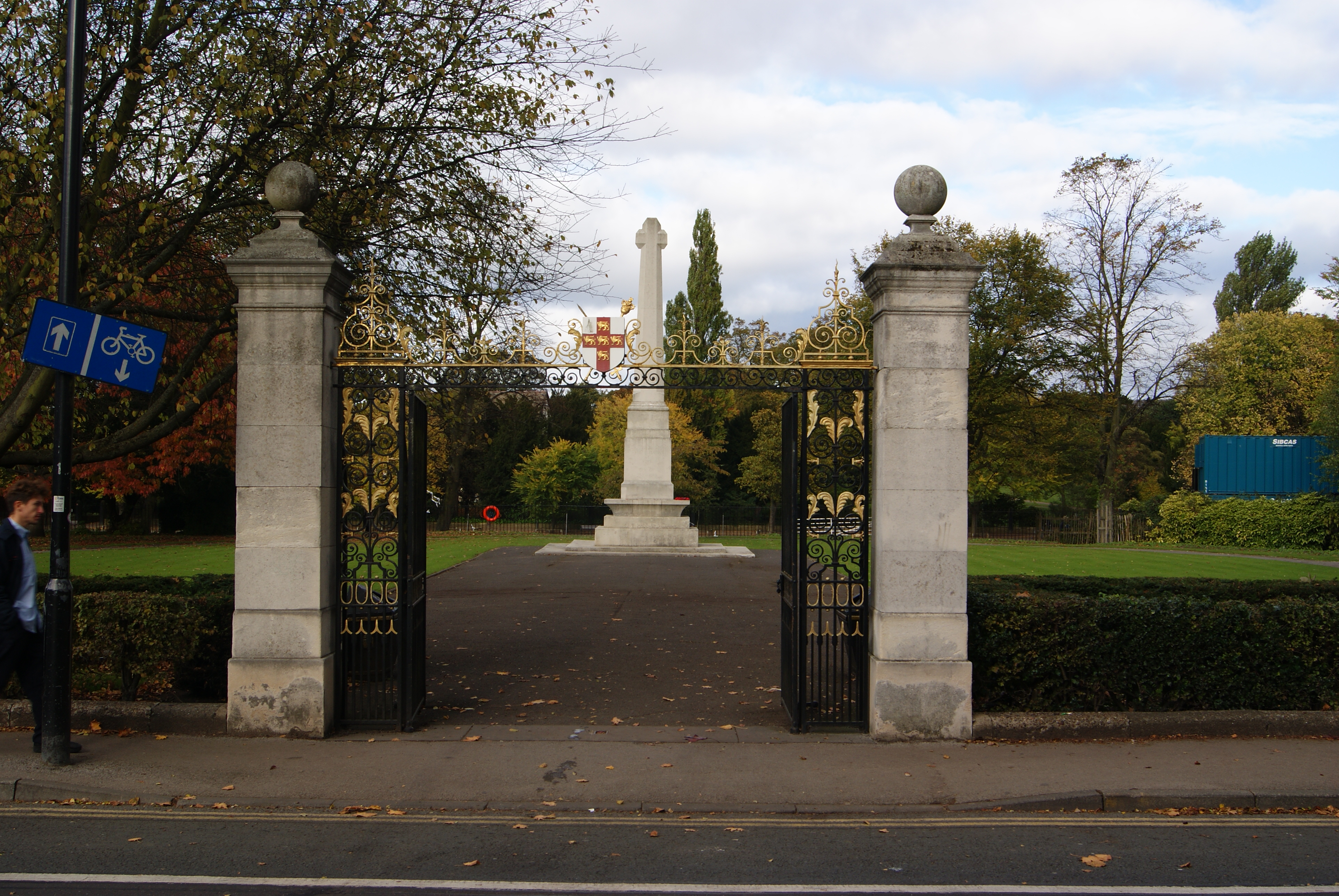
Lutyens designed the piers and gates at the entrance to the war memorial garden using the remaining funds raised for the memorial.

The memorial was unveiled a year after the North Eastern Railway War Memorial, at a ceremony on 25 June 1925, which was attended by large crowds. Prince Albert, the Duke of York (later King George VI), performed the unveiling and the Archbishop of York Cosmo Gordon Lang gave a dedication. The Duchess of York had earlier that day unveiled the Five Sisters window in York Minster, dedicated to the "women of the Empire" killed in the First World War.

Of Portland stone construction, the memorial is in the form of a 33-foot (10-metre) high, lozenge-shaped shaft with short, chamfered arms, moulded where they meet the shaft to form a cross. The cross stands on a base of four uneven rectangular blocks, below which is an undercut square platform, which itself stands on two square blocks. At the very bottom are two wide, shallow steps. The largest block of the base bears the only inscription on the memorial: "TO THE CITIZENS OF YORK 1914 – 1918, 1939 – 1945" on the south face, and "THEIR NAME LIVETH FOR EVERMORE" on the north; the dates of the Second World War were added later. As a memento, a bottle, several coins, and a newspaper were placed inside the structure. The memorial stands in a war memorial garden on the south bank of the River Ouse; it overlooks the river and the ruins of St Mary's Abbey on the opposite bank.

When the accounts were reconciled in April 1926, there remained £400 in the memorial fund after Lutyens' fee of £122 and expenses of £20, so the committee commissioned Lutyens to design a set of entrance gates and a pair of supporting piers at the entrance to the memorial garden. The tall, rectangular piers are of limestone construction with cornices and finials in the shape of balls. The gates themselves are iron painted black and gold, with iron panels linking them to the piers and an overthrow above, in the centre of which is the City of York's coat of arms. The gates open towards the memorial and are aligned with it. To wind up the memorial fund, the committee spent the remaining £17 on three wooden benches for the memorial garden.

The York City War Memorial was designated a Grade II listed building (a status which offers statutory protection from demolition or modification, applied to structures of "special interest, warranting every effort to preserve them") on 10 September 1970 and the gates and piers were separately listed at Grade II on 24 June 1983. The nearby NER memorial, just the other side of the city walls, was listed at Grade II* (defined as "particularly important buildings of more than special interest" and applied to about 5.5% of listed buildings) on 10 September 1970. In November 2015, as part of commemorations for the centenary of the First World War, Lutyens' war memorials were recognised as a national collection and all of his free-standing memorials in England were listed or had their listing status reviewed; their National Heritage List for England list entries were also updated and expanded. As part of this process, the York City memorial was upgraded from Grade II to Grade II*.

== See also ==
- Grade II* listed buildings in the City of York
- Grade II* listed war memorials in England
- Listed buildings in York (outside the city walls, southern part)
