= North Eastern Railway War Memorial =

First World War memorial in York, England

- United Kingdom
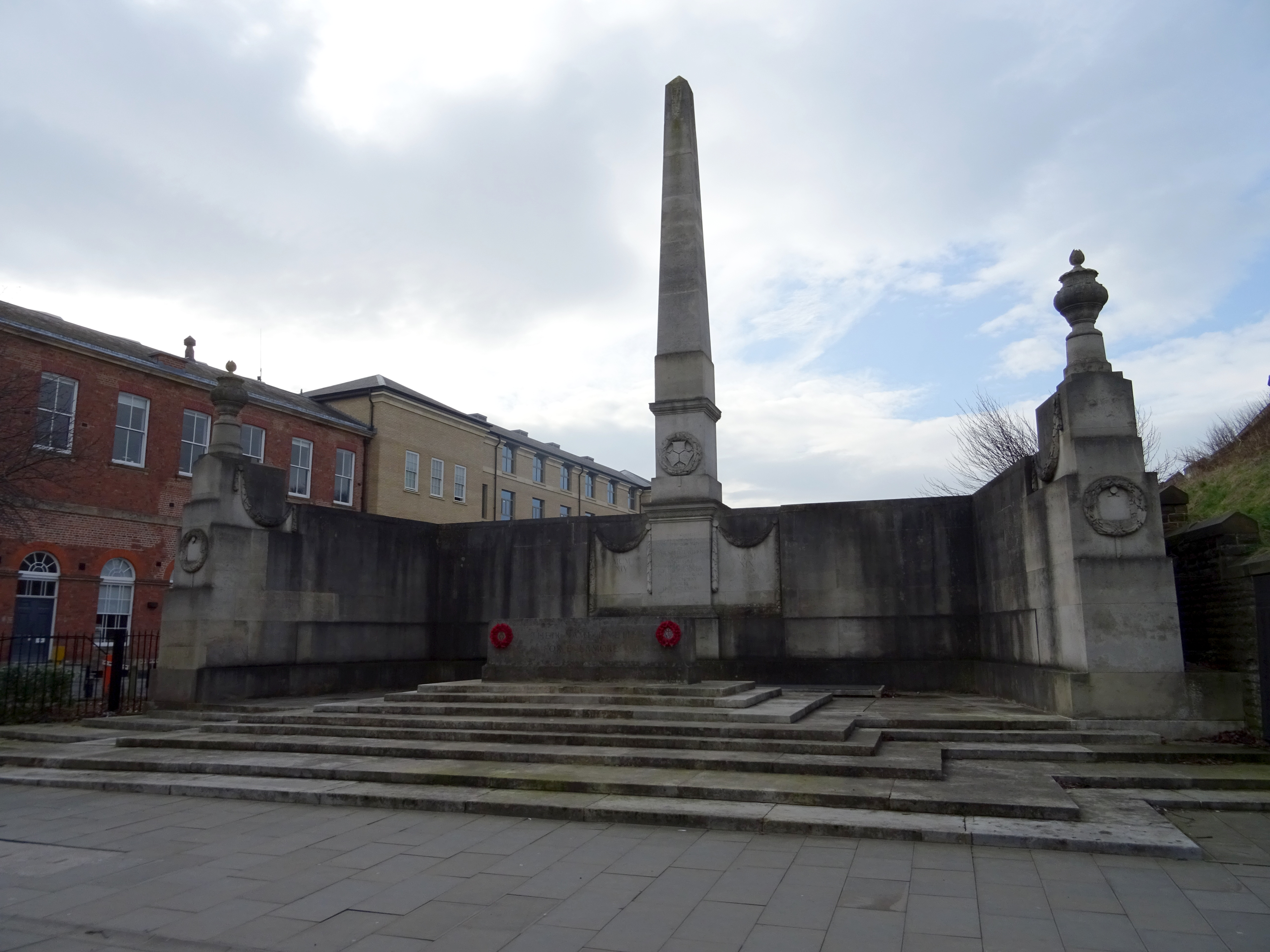
- For employees of the North Eastern Railway killed in the First World War
- Unveiled: 1924
- Location: 53.958658°N 1.089814°W; Station Approach, York, England
- Designed by: Sir Edwin Lutyens

Listed Building – Grade II*
- Official name: North Eastern Railway Company War Memorial
- Designated: 10 September 1970
- Reference no.: 1256553

The North Eastern Railway War Memorial is a First World War memorial in York in northern England. It was designed by Sir Edwin Lutyens to commemorate employees of the North Eastern Railway (NER) who left to fight in the First World War and were killed while serving. The NER board voted in early 1920 to allocate £20,000 for a memorial and commissioned Lutyens. The committee for the York City War Memorial followed suit and also appointed Lutyens, but both schemes became embroiled in controversy. Concerns were raised from within the community about the effect of the NER memorial on the city walls and its impact on the proposed scheme for the city's war memorial, given that the two memorials were planned to be 100 yards (90 metres) apart and the city's budget was a tenth of the NER's. The controversy was resolved after Lutyens modified his plans for the NER memorial to move it away from the walls and the city opted for a revised scheme on land just outside the walls; coincidentally the land was owned by the NER, whose board donated it to the city.

The NER memorial was unveiled on 14 June 1924 by Field Marshal Lord Plumer. It consists of a 54-foot (16-metre) high obelisk which rises from the rear portion of a three-sided screen wall. The wall forms a recess in which stands Lutyens' characteristic Stone of Remembrance. The wall itself is decorated with several carved swags and wreaths, including a wreath surrounding the NER's coat of arms at the base of the obelisk. The memorial is a grade II* listed building, and is part of a "national collection" of Lutyens' war memorials.

== Background ==
The North Eastern Railway (NER), one of the largest employers in the north of England, released over 18,000 of its employees to serve in the armed forces during the First World War, many of them joining the 17th (North Eastern Railway) Battalion of the Northumberland Fusiliers; a number of deaths occurred when the North Eastern Railway Tug Stranton sank off the south coast of England. By the end of the war, 2,236 men from the company had died on military service overseas; others were killed at home by bombardments of east coast ports, such as the raid on Scarborough, Hartlepool and Whitby, and in the three Zeppelin raids on York.

After the war, thousands of memorials were built across Britain. Among the most prominent designers of memorials was architect Sir Edwin Lutyens, described by Historic England as "the leading English architect of his generation". Lutyens designed The Cenotaph in London, which became the focus for the national Remembrance Sunday commemorations, as well as the Thiepval Memorial to the Missing—the largest British war memorial anywhere in the world—and the Stone of Remembrance which appears in all large Commonwealth War Graves Commission cemeteries and in several of Lutyens' war memorials in Britain, including the North Eastern Railway's.

The war memorial is one of several buildings and structures in the centre of York related to the NER, including the company's headquarters and the city's original railway station. The site—chosen as being immediately adjacent to the company's head office—was originally a coal depot and carriage sidings.

== Inception ==
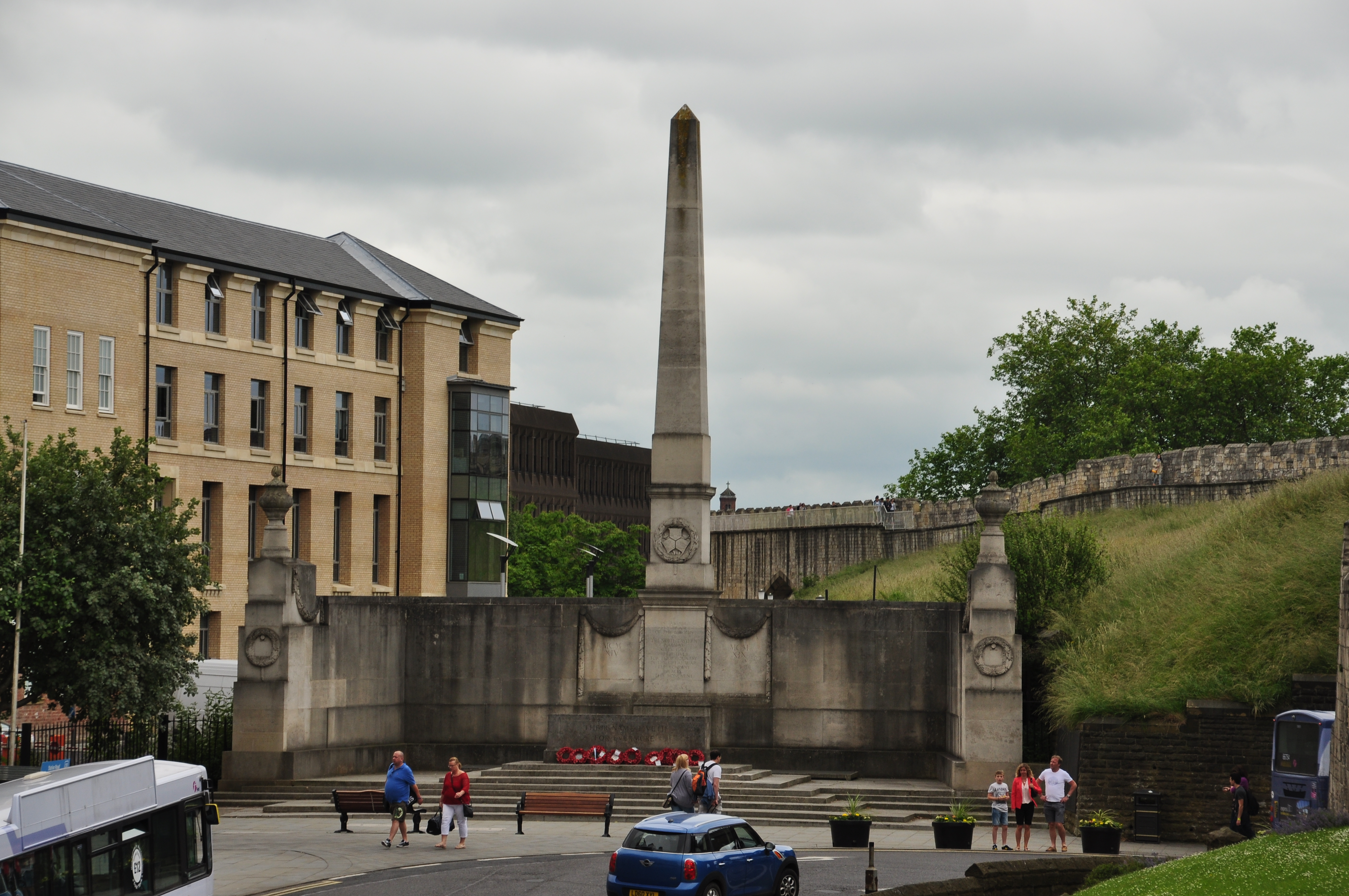
The memorial viewed from Station Road with the city walls in the background; the memorial was originally to abut the wall but the design had to be modified after it proved controversial.

At a meeting in April 1919, the NER's board discussed the idea of a war memorial, and decided that it should be of "an ornamental, rather than of a utilitarian character". The board initially planned to seek donations for the project from its workforce, but changed its mind after the general manager reported that the idea met with widespread disapproval among employees. It then formed a subcommittee to consider possible designs and propose a suitable budget. At the company's annual general meeting in February 1920, a resolution was passed allocating a budget of £20,000 for the designing and building of a memorial. The board commissioned Lutyens, which was confirmed in October 1921, for a fee of £700 plus travel and out-of-pocket expenses. The NER's deputy general manager explained that Lutyens had been chosen because he was "the fashionable architect and therefore could do no wrong".

The project became embroiled in a controversy surrounding its size and location, which grew to envelop the proposed York City War Memorial. Following the railway company's lead, the City War Memorial Committee also appointed Lutyens, and endorsed his plan for a Stone of Remembrance elevated on a large plinth in the moat by Lendal Bridge, 100 yards (90 metres) from the proposed site of the NER's memorial. The controversy revolved partly around the relationship between the two memorials—Lutyens felt that the two designs would complement one another, but the city had given Lutyens a budget of £2,000, a tenth of that allocated to him by the NER, and some members of the local community were concerned that the railway company's memorial would be much larger and would overshadow the city's. Another concern, raised by a city councillor, was that visitors walking into the city centre from the railway station would see the NER's memorial first. Lutyens responded that he felt the two memorials would show a common purpose, and thus that their proximity was not an issue.

The issue was further complicated by the proximity of both proposed schemes to York's ancient city walls; both schemes required the consent of the Ancient Monuments Board (later English Heritage and now Historic England), particularly as Lutyens' design for the NER involved the memorial abutting the city walls and would have required excavation of part of the ramparts, to which the Yorkshire Architectural and York Archaeological Society (YAYAS) strenuously objected. The NER's in-house architect suggested moving the memorial ten feet (three metres) to the east, away from the wall; Lutyens, in India at the time, dismissed the idea in a cable. In February 1922, the secretary of the YAYAS, Dr William Evelyn, gave a lecture in which he was severely critical of the NER's proposed memorial. He told his audience "I think it is an enormous pity that they cannot find room in which to place a sacred emblem commemorative of the patriotism, bravery, and self-sacrifice of our own soldiers of the twentieth century and that it should be considered necessary to deface and despoil another sacred emblem". The City War Memorial Committee and representatives of the NER met with Charles Reed Peers, the Ancient Monuments Board's chief inspector, at the NER's offices on 8 July 1922, in preparation for which the NER erected a full-size wooden model of their proposed memorial. Peers approved the city's scheme, noting that its proposed location was in fact a newer structure and not part of the walls' ramparts, but requested that Lutyens submit a revised design for the NER's memorial to move it away from the wall. Lutyens acquiesced but observed that the modifications would require a reduction in the size of the screen wall and thus in the size of the names to be listed on it, which he felt was detrimental to the scheme. He submitted the revised designs and they were approved in October 1922.

The remaining issues were largely resolved after the city relented to public pressure and opted to site its memorial on a plot of land off Leeman Road, just outside the city walls, and for a reduced scheme in the form of a cross due to a shortage of funds. Coincidentally, the land was owned by the railway company and the NER board donated it to the city in a mark of gratitude for the good relations between the company and the city; the NER had by that time been amalgamated into the London and North Eastern Railway (LNER) as a result of the Railways Act 1921.

== Design ==
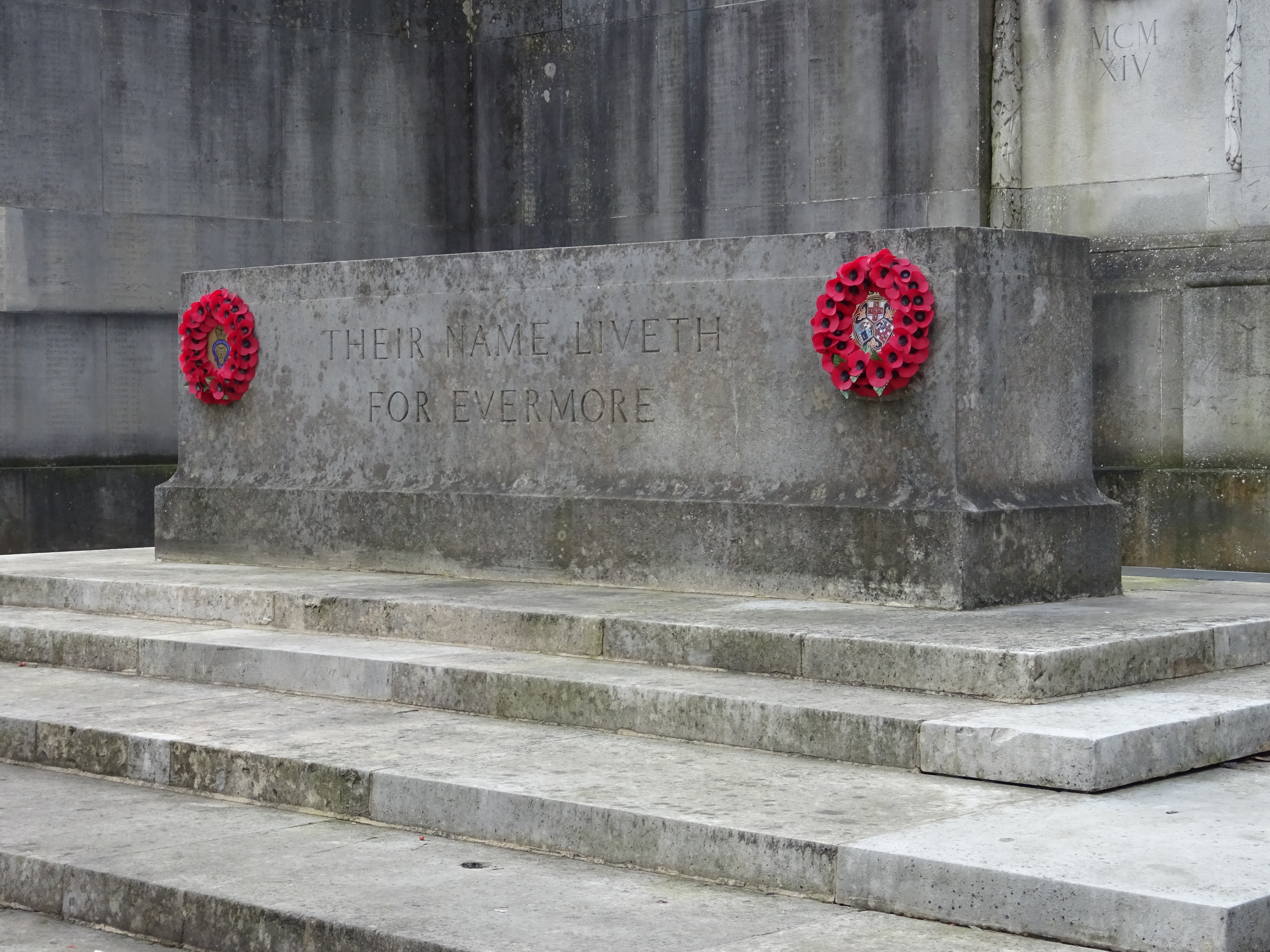
Close-up of the Stone of Remembrance on its own platform set forward from the screen wall; Lutyens designed the stone for the Imperial (later Commonwealth) War Graves commission, but it also features in several of his war memorials.

Built from Portland stone, the memorial is sited against the ramparts of the city walls. It consists of a single, 30-foot (9-metre) obelisk rising from a three-tiered pedestal set into the rear portion of a three-sided screen wall. The wall creates a recess, sheltering a Stone of Remembrance. The two flanking sides terminate with urn-shaped finials; the ends of each wall are decorated with a laurel wreath in relief carving; the inside of the walls is further decorated with laurel swags below the urns. The rear wall bears further relief swags to either side of the obelisk; the North Eastern Railway Company's coat of arms is engraved on the pedestal of the obelisk, just above the level of the screen wall, which is surrounded by another laurel wreath. The obelisk rises above the screen wall to a total height of 54 feet (16 metres). The Stone of Remembrance is a monolith in the shape of an altar, 12 feet (3.7 metres) long and curved so slightly as to barely be visible to the naked eye; it is deliberately devoid of any decoration besides the inscription "THEIR NAME LIVETH FOR EVERMORE".

The dedication is inscribed in the centre of the rear part of the screen wall: "IN REMEMBRANCE OF THOSE MEN OF THE NORTH EASTERN RAILWAY WHO GAVE THEIR LIVES FOR THEIR COUNTRY THE COMPANY PLACES THIS MONUMENT"; the dates of the First World War are inscribed to either side. The 2,236 names were inscribed on panels affixed to the wall. Behind the Stone of Remembrance are 15 slates set into the floor of the memorial in 1984, bearing the names of the LNER's 551 dead from the Second World War.

== History ==
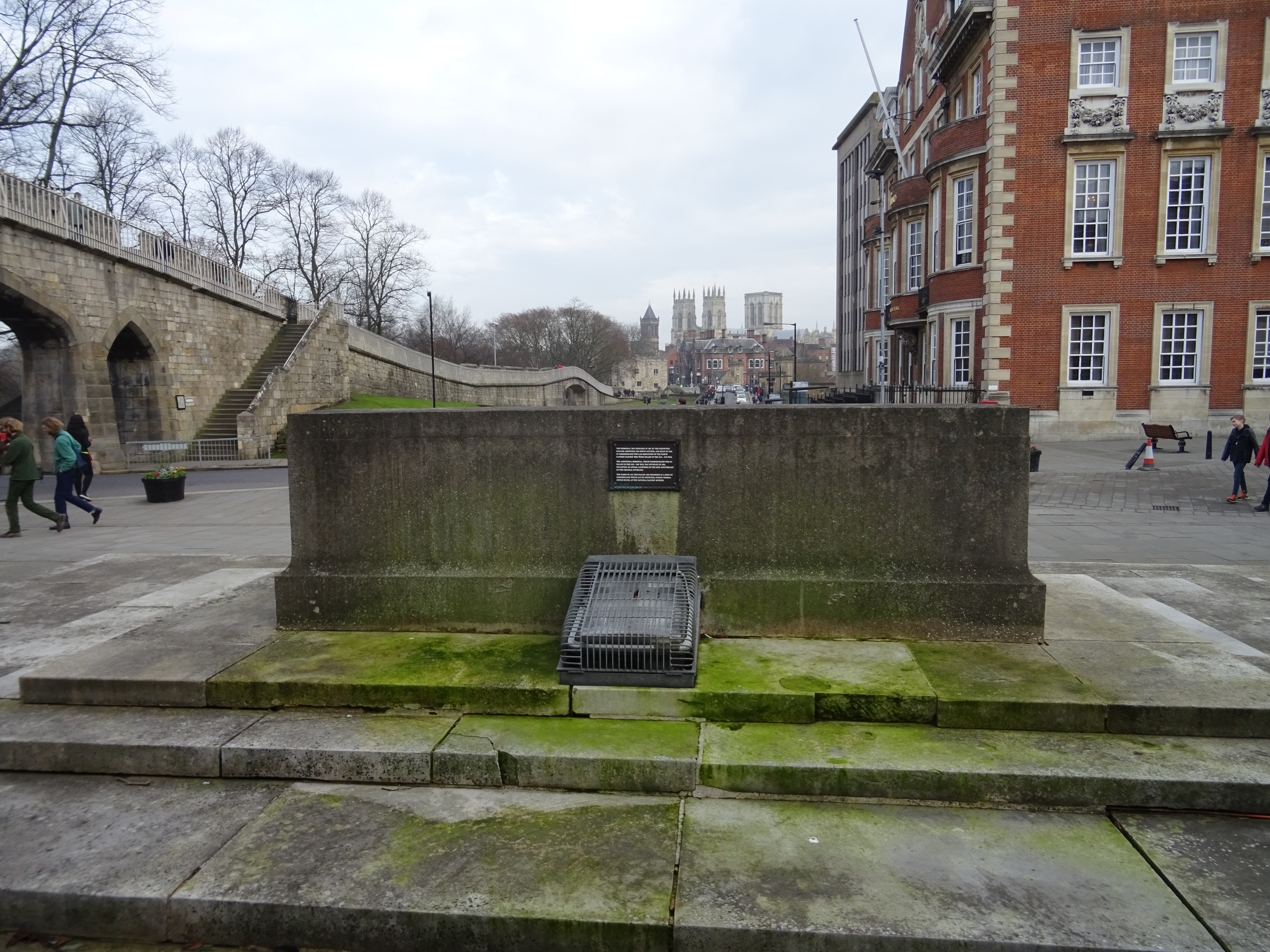
The rear of the Stone of Remembrance, viewed from the main part of the memorial. The NER's former headquarters is to the right and York's city walls are to the left; York Minster is visible in the background.

The North Eastern Railway War Memorial was finally constructed once the ancient Monuments Board approved Lutyens' modified design; it was unveiled by Field Marshal Herbert Plumer, 1st Baron Plumer (later 1st Viscount Plumer) at a ceremony on 14 June 1924, and dedicated by the Archbishop of York Cosmo Gordon Lang. A crowd of five to six thousand people gathered for the ceremony, among them multiple civic officials and officers of the LNER and former NER, including Sir Ralph Wedgwood, chief officer of the LNER; the Sheriff of York; and the lord mayors of Bradford, Hull, and York. Sentries from the Durham Light Infantry stood at the four corners of the Stone of Remembrance. Among those to give speeches was Edward Grey, 1st Viscount Grey of Fallodon, a member of the NER's board and the former foreign secretary famous for his remark "the lamps are going out". Grey spoke of the losses caused by the war: "the old North Eastern board and its general manager numbered some twenty persons. Out of those twenty, four lost sons in the war; three lost only sons. There is no reason to suppose that proportion is exceptional". At the conclusion of the service, the "Last Post" was sounded and the crowd observed two minutes' silence. The city's war memorial was unveiled a year later.

The inscriptions, particularly the names of those killed, suffered from exposure to the elements. Restoration work, including re-carving, was carried out in the 1980s, funded by donations from the British Railways Engineers Ex-Servicemen's Association match-funded by British Rail. Erosion continued in the years following and in lieu of re-carving them and causing further damage to the memorial, the names were recorded in a book which is held by the National Railway Museum.

The memorial was designated a grade II* listed building (a status which offers statutory protection from demolition or modification, defined as "particularly important buildings of more than special interest" and applied to about 5.5% of listed buildings) on 10 September 1970. In November 2015, as part of commemorations for the centenary of the First World War, Lutyens' war memorials were recognised as a national collection and all 44 of his free-standing memorials in England were listed or had their listing status reviewed and their National Heritage List for England entries updated and expanded. As part of this process, the York City memorial was upgraded to grade II* to match the NER's memorial.

In October 2024, to mark the memorial's centenary, Network Rail (NR) commissioned an extensive cleaning of the structure. Contractors used low-pressure, high temperature steam jets to clean the stonework without further damaging the inscriptions. NR was reported to have been looking at the feasibility of fresh carving, while acknowledging that it was "notoriously hard to re-carve into already degraded Portland stone".

== See also ==
- Media related to North Eastern Railway War Memorial, York at Wikimedia Commons
- Grade II* listed buildings in the City of York
- Grade II* listed war memorials in England
- Great Eastern Railway War Memorial, at London Liverpool Street station
- Great Western Railway War Memorial, at London Paddington station
- Listed buildings in York (within the city walls, southern part)
- London and North Western Railway War Memorial, outside London Euston station
- Midland Railway War Memorial, in Derby (also by Lutyens)
