= Reginald Wynn Owen =

Welsh architect (1876–1950)

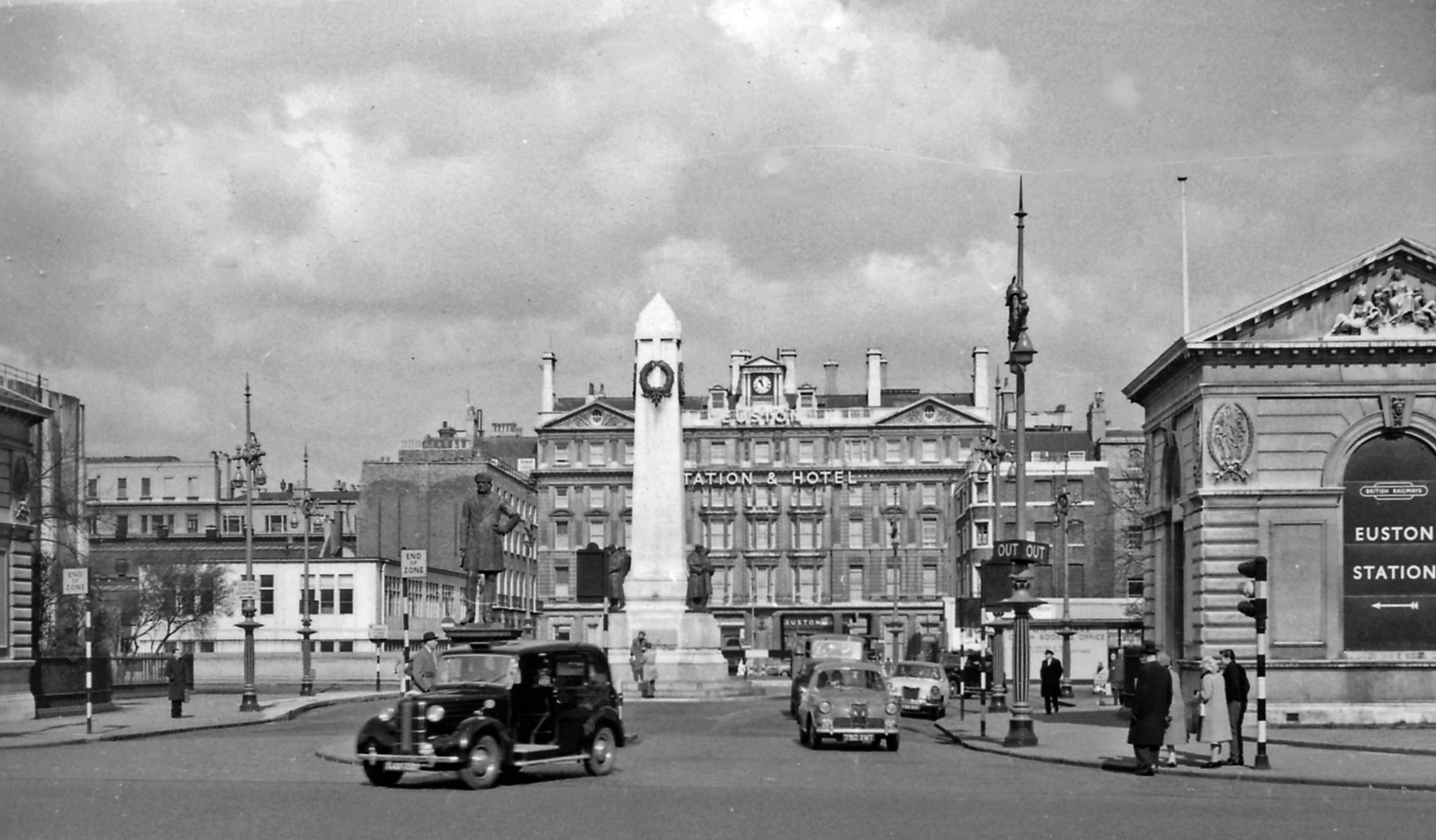
The war memorial at Euston railway station designed by Reginald Wynn Owen

Reginald Wynn Owen FRIBA (23 July 1876 – 15 May 1950) was a British architect noted for his work for the London and North Western Railway.

He was born in Beaumaris, Anglesey, Wales, the sixth child of Elijah Wynn Owen and Elizabeth.

He trained as a diocesan architect in the Diocese of Bangor, articled to Peter Shearson Gregory from 1893 to 1896, and then at the University of Liverpool School of Architecture where he was assistant to Thomas Taliesin Rees from 1897 to 1898, where he won the Queen’s Prize for Perspective in 1898. Then he was articled to Owen Roberts of Moorfields in 1898, John Clarke 1898 to 1899 and to Grayson and Ould from 1899. He started work with the London and North Eastern Railway in 1911 and moved to London. He is probably best known for the Euston Station War Memorial which was unveiled on 21 October 1921.

He was appointed Associate of the Royal Institute of British Architects on 18 February 1901 and elected as a Fellow of the Royal Institute of British Architects on 7 April 1930.

He died on 15 May 1950 and was buried in Vicarage Road Cemetery, Watford.

== List of works ==
- Two houses in Craven Drive, New Brighton, Liverpool
- St Thomas’ Church, Ashfield, Wavertree, Liverpool 1907 (closed in 2005)
- Additions to the Euston dining rooms 1915
- Nuneaton railway station 1915
- London and North Western Railway War Memorial, Euston railway station, 1921
- New Information Bureau, Euston Railway Station 1930
- North London Railway War Memorial, Broad Street station (now at Hoxton station)
