= Great Eastern Railway War Memorial =

War memorial in Liverpool Street station

- Great Eastern Railway
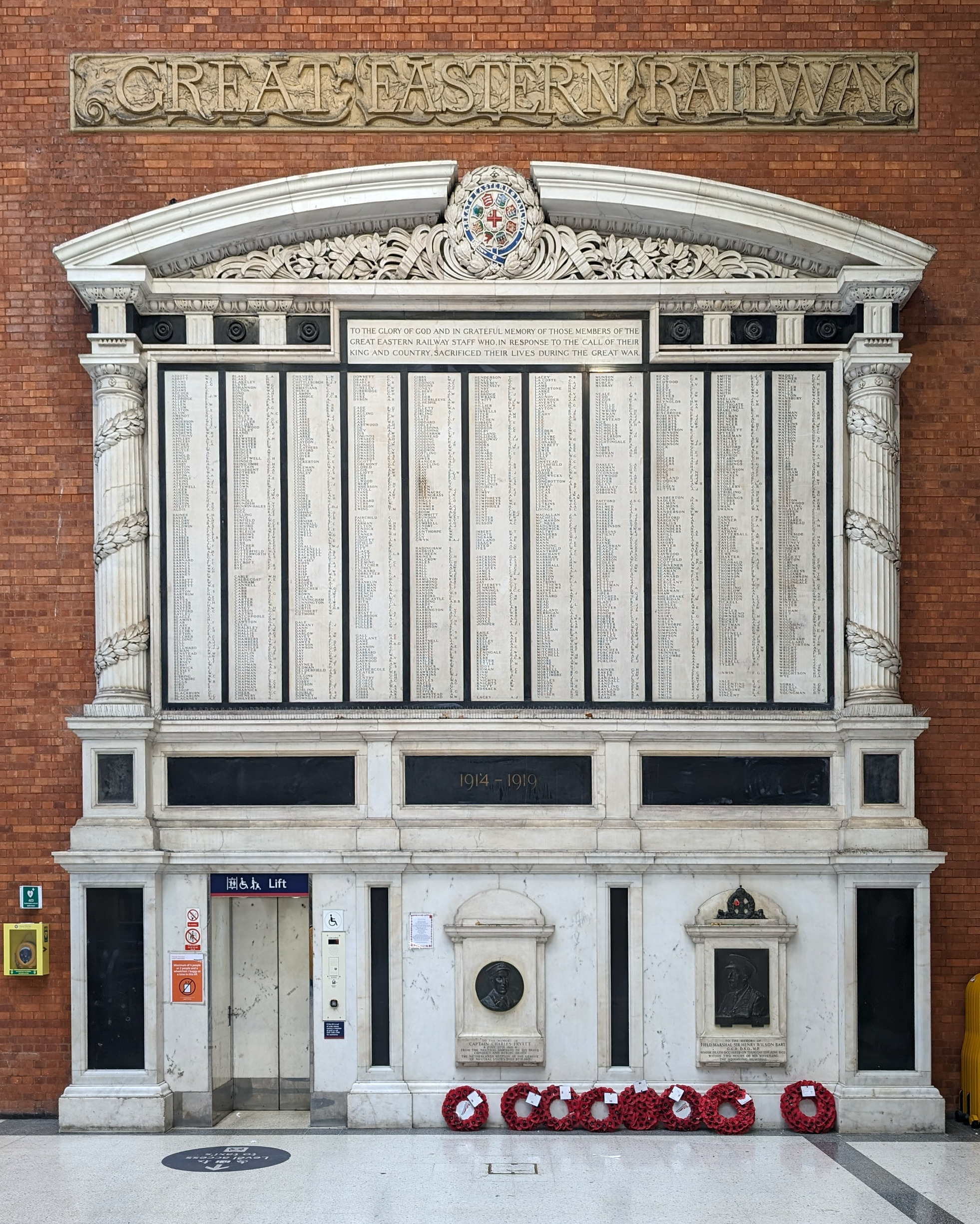
- The memorial in 2024
- Used for those deceased
- Established: 22 June 1922
- Location: 51°31′3.94″N 0°4′55.76″W; Liverpool Street station
- Commemorated: 1100
- To the glory of God and in grateful memory of the / Great Eastern Railway staff who in response to the call of their / King and Country, sacrificed their lives during the Great War

The Great Eastern Railway War Memorial is a First World War memorial installed at Liverpool Street station in the City of London, United Kingdom.

The large marble memorial plaque was created by Farmer & Brindley at a cost of £3,326. It lists over 1,100 names in 11 columns, with carved marble pilasters to either side, surmounted by a segmental pediment housing the arms of the Great Eastern Railway. An inscription at the top reads: "To the glory of God and in grateful memory of the / Great Eastern Railway staff who in response to the call of their / King and Country, sacrificed their lives during the Great War".

The memorial was originally located in the station's booking hall. It was unveiled on 22 June 1922 by Field Marshal Sir Henry Wilson and dedicated by the Bishop of Norwich. A few hours later, Wilson was shot and killed on his own doorstep in Eaton Place, Belgravia, by members of the Irish Republican Army as he returned home from unveiling the memorial.

It was relocated in c. 1990 when the station was renovated, and moved to a site above the main station concourse, near the entrance from Liverpool Street. An inscription reading "Great Eastern Railway", removed from the nearby Harwich House when it was demolished as part of the renovations, was installed above the relocated memorial. Also relocated to the wall below the large war memorial are smaller memorials to Wilson and to Captain Charles Fryatt, an officer of the Great Eastern Railway's marine service who was executed by the Germans in 1916 after being convicted at a court martial as a franc-tireur.

== See also ==
- Great Western Railway War Memorial, at Paddington station (to the west)
- London, Brighton and South Coast Railway War Memorial, at London Bridge station (to the south east)
- North Eastern Railway War Memorial, in York
- Midland Railway War Memorial, in Derby
