= Great Western Railway War Memorial =

Railway company war memorial in London, England

- United Kingdom
- The memorial after Remembrance Sunday, 2021
- For employees of the Great Western Railway killed in the First World War
- Unveiled: 11 November 1922
- Location: 51.5165°N 0.1776°W; Paddington station, London
- Designed by: Thomas Smith Tait (architect); Charles Sargeant Jagger (sculptor)

The Great Western Railway War Memorial is a First World War memorial by Charles Sargeant Jagger and Thomas S. Tait. It stands on platform 1 at London Paddington station, commemorating the 2,500 employees of the Great Western Railway (GWR) who were killed in the conflict. One-third of the GWR's workforce of almost 80,000 left to fight in the First World War, the company guaranteeing their jobs, and the GWR gave over its workshops for munitions manufacturing as well as devoting its network to transporting soldiers and military equipment. The company considered several schemes for a war memorial before approaching Jagger to design a statue. Some officials continued to push for an alternate design, to the point that Jagger threatened to resign. Jagger was working on several other war memorial commissions at the same time as the GWR's, including his most famous, the Royal Artillery Memorial.

The memorial consists of a bronze statue of a soldier, dressed in heavy winter clothing, reading a letter from home. The statue stands on platform 1 of Paddington station, on a polished granite plinth within a white stone surround. The names of the dead were recorded on a roll that was buried underneath the plinth. Viscount Churchill, the company chairman, unveiled the memorial on 11 November 1922, in front of the Archbishop of Canterbury, GWR officials, and more than 6,000 relatives of the dead. Such was the expected size of the crowd that the GWR built viewing stands across two platforms and the tracks in between them.

Jagger's statue was the model for a memorial to commemorate the British Army's postal service, unveiled in 1981, and for a scheme in 2014 encouraging people to write a letter as part of the First World War centenary. During the COVID-19 pandemic, local communities on the GWR network laid wreaths on trains that carried them to Paddington to be laid at the memorial for Armistice Day.

== Background ==
=== Great Western Railway ===
The Great Western Railway (GWR) was one of Britain's largest railway companies at the start of the 20th century. Its network, radiating from London Paddington station, covered much of the south and west of England and South Wales, and reached into the Midlands. At the outbreak of the First World War, all railways were taken under government control. In the early stages of the war, the railway was concentrated on moving military personnel and supplies to ports for shipping to France and to military establishments in Britain, especially Plymouth Dockyard and the multiple army bases around Salisbury Plain.

As with other major employers, many of the GWR's employees left to join the armed forces; this contribution to the war effort was a source of pride for the GWR and there was considerable competition between the railway companies over the number of troops each provided. The GWR offered a guarantee that it would re-employ all those who left to fight, once the war was over. In August 1914, the month the war began, over 4,000 GWR employees (mainly reservists), were called up, a number which increased to almost 8,500 by the end of October. In December 1914, the GWR published its first casualty figures—58 men were reported killed and 200 had been wounded or taken prisoner. By June 1916, over 23,000 GWR employees had enlisted and the railway was forced to implement controls to ensure it was able to continue its operations. New volunteers required management approval to enlist, and workers in some essential jobs were not released. The GWR had a workforce of 78,000 people in 1914, of whom roughly one third—24,000 men—joined the armed forces. Of those, 1,902 had been reported killed by the end of November 1918; the final figure, used for the memorial, was 2,524. As well as manpower, the GWR gave up the majority of its ships for military use. Its other war-related endeavours included running ambulance trains and producing munitions in its workshops.

=== Artists ===
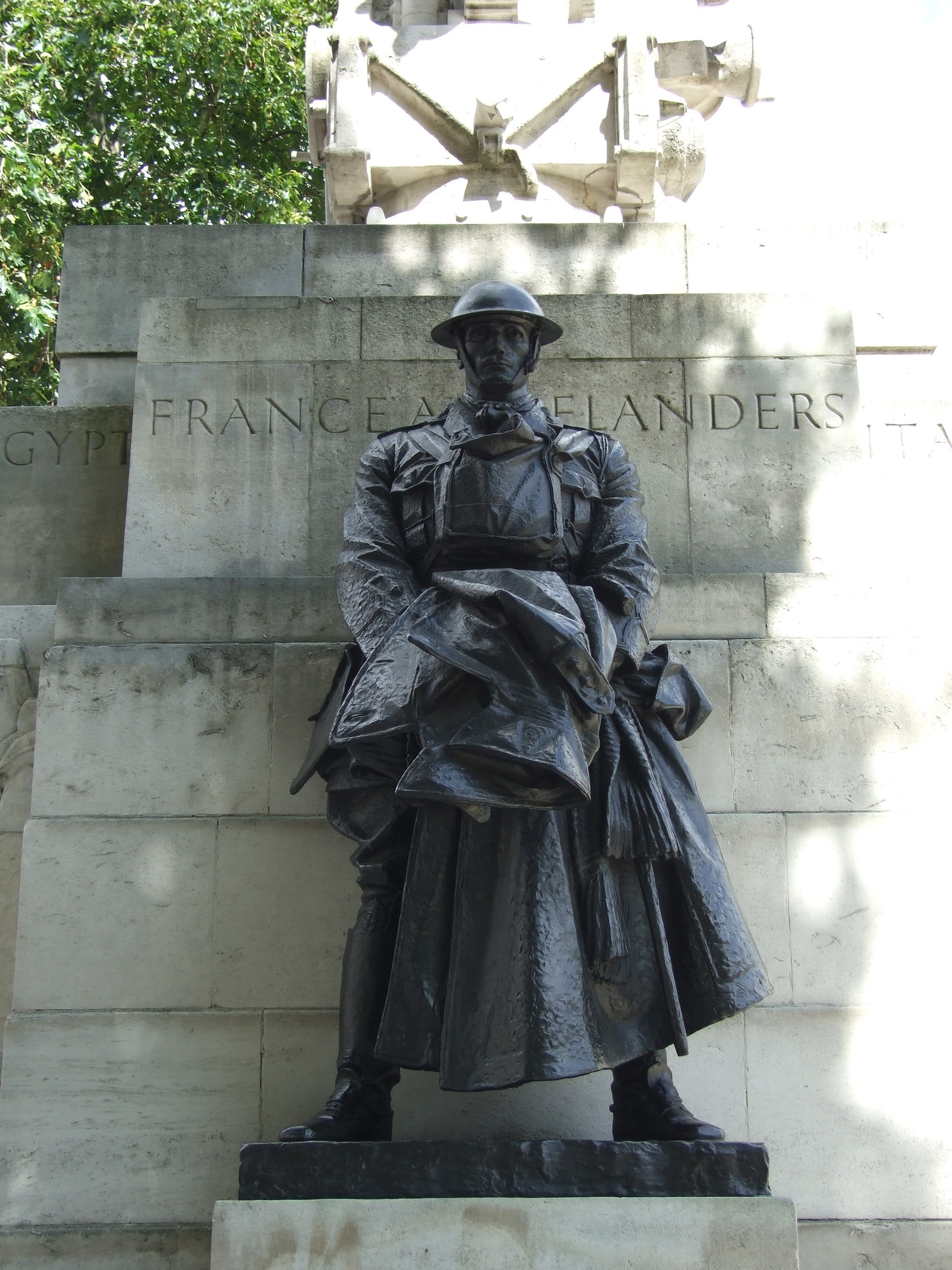
One of Jagger's figures on the Royal Artillery Memorial. Jagger was known for the realism of the soldiers he sculpted.

In the aftermath of the war, memorials were built across Britain, including many by private companies in honour of their employees. Charles Sargeant Jagger (1885–1934) was a sculptor who joined the army at the outbreak of the war. He was wounded several times and awarded the Military Cross for gallantry. He later built his artistic reputation on his designs for war memorials. His first memorial commission was the Hoylake and West Kirby War Memorial. The expressive figures he sculpted for that memorial were highly praised, leading to commissions for war memorials across England and several battlefield memorials abroad. Although memorialisation of the First World War was largely the preserve of architects, Jagger enjoyed more success as a designer of war memorials than any other British sculptor, receiving several high-profile commissions. He was working on several commissions at around the same time as the GWR's memorial, including Portsmouth War Memorial and the Royal Artillery Memorial, his most famous work. All feature Jagger's characteristic "Tommy", a soldier in action, rather than the spiritual figures more commonly found on war monuments.

Thomas Smith Tait (1882–1954) was an architect educated at the Glasgow School of Art. He enlisted in the army under the Derby Scheme and spent most of the war as a draughtsman at the Royal Artillery Barracks, Woolwich. After the end of hostilities, he developed a reputation as a designer of war memorials, which included several collaborations with Jagger.

== Commissioning ==
The GWR established a war memorial committee to explore option for commemorations. Among the options it rejected were a triumphal arch on the approach to Paddington station (which would have been in keeping with the London and South Western Railway's memorial at Waterloo station), a mural on a wall at Paddington, a series of tablets at stations on the GWR network, or an engraving on Paddington's pedestrian footbridge. Eventually the committee decided to commission a statuary memorial. The railway company authorised £5,625, though the completed memorial came in around £1,000 under budget.

The GWR chose Jagger to design its memorial. Sir Reginald Blomfield had recommended him to the government, and this recommendation appears to have been passed to a member of the GWR's board. The committee also sought recommendations from several established sculptors, and George Frampton recommended him to Sir Ernest Palmer, the chairman of the committee. The relationship between sculptor and client was not always smooth—the company closely monitored Jagger's progress, much to his annoyance. He submitted multiple designs which did not meet with the committee's approval. At one point, Jagger wrote a letter of resignation after members of the war memorial committee continued to push for a bas-relief sculpture rather than the statue specified. The letter prompted a personal visit from the GWR's chief engineer, followed by a letter from the board expressing their desire that Jagger should complete the work as previously agreed.

== Design ==
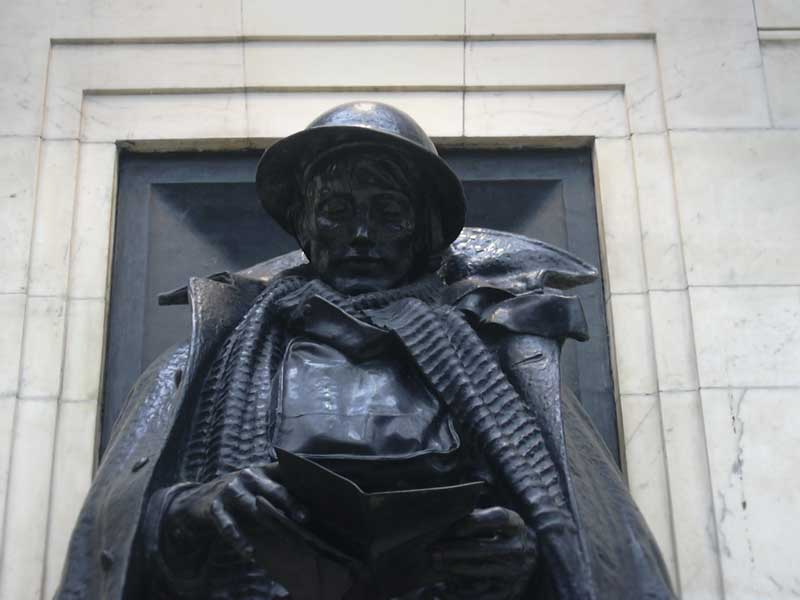
Close-up of the soldier reading his letter, showing Jagger's attention to detail

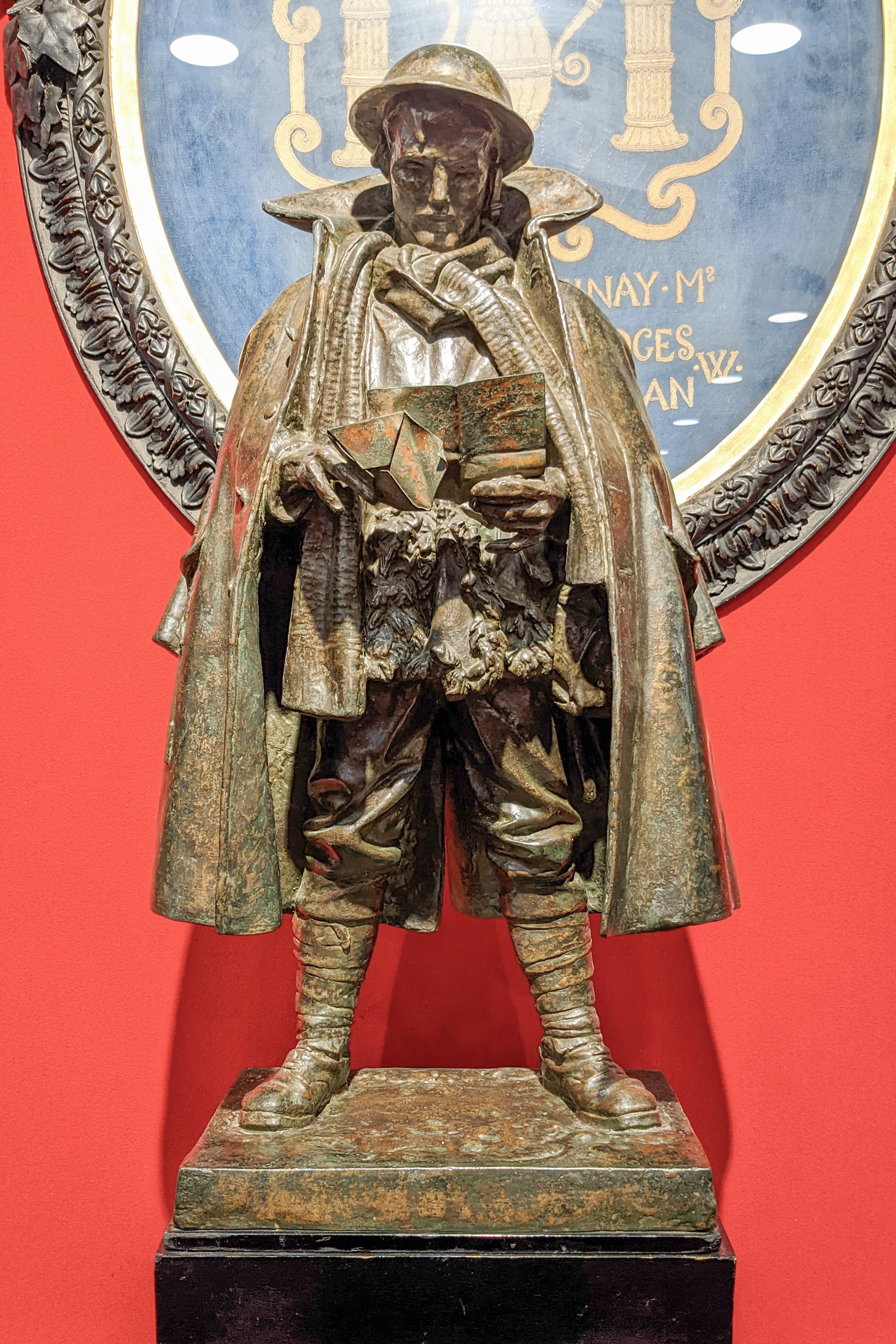
Jagger's model for the statue, on display in Founders' Hall, London

The GWR began commemorations for its war dead from December 1915, when it first published its casualty statistics, starting with a paper roll of honour held in a custom-made wooden case and displayed on platform 1 at Paddington station. Copies were later made, which were displayed at other principal stations on the GWR network.

The memorial, also placed on platform 1, consists of an over-life-size bronze statue of a soldier by Jagger, cast by the Thames Ditton Foundry in Surrey. The soldier is dressed in his greatcoat, sheepskin jerkin (a sleeveless undercoat), and scarf, with his helmet pushed back and resting on his shoulders, and reading a letter from home. The sculpture stands on a decorative plinth (pedestal), backed by a screen, which features the badges of the Royal Navy and the Royal Air Force in relief carving. The plinth is in polished Belgian granite except for a band of darker Aberdeen granite, contrasting with the white Portland stone of the screen behind. The stonework was designed by Tait. A sealed casket, made at the GWR's Swindon Works and bearing the names of the dead, was buried in the plinth. This was in contrast to the approach taken at other war memorials, including the Great Eastern Railway War Memorial at Liverpool Street station across London, where the names are on display on the wall. As part of the war memorial scheme, Tait redesigned the windows and doors in the wall behind the memorial with oak panelling. Jagger carved the GWR's company arms and the royal arms into the wood above the royal waiting room (now the first class lounge).

The main inscription on the memorial, below the soldier's feet, reads:

IN HONOUR OF THOSE WHO SERVED IN THE GREAT WAR / 1914–1918 / 25,479 MEN OF THE GREAT WESTERN RAILWAY JOINED HIS MAJESTY'S FORCES / 2,524 GAVE THEIR LIVES.

Below the original dedication, at the base of the plinth, a second inscription reads:

IN HONOUR OF THOSE WHO SERVED IN THE WORLD WARS / 1914 † 1918 / 1939 † 1945 / 3,312 MEN AND WOMEN OF THE GREAT WESTERN RAILWAY GAVE THEIR LIVES FOR KING AND COUNTRY

This was added after the Second World War to commemorate the railway's casualties from that conflict.

Anthony Lambert, writing for Historic England, described the statue as an "intensely felt and moving sculpture". Lambert attributed the figure's realism to Jagger's war experience, a conclusion with which academics Gill Abousnnouga and David Machin concurred in a book about war memorials. The pair described the scene of the soldier reading a letter as poignant, but go on to suggest that the stature of the figure—with his heavy coat resting on his shoulders—along with the weight of the bronze projects a sense of strength. Joe Whitlock Blundell and Roger Hudson, in their study of London's statuary, The Immortals, also note the influence of his military service on Jagger's sculpture, writing that he "knew whereof he spoke". Alan Borg, an art historian and former director of the Imperial War Museum compared the statue favourably to Jagger's more famous Royal Artillery Memorial: he felt that the quality and power of the GWR was equal to that of the Royal Artillery's, which he described as "one of the outstanding examples of 20th-century British art". According to the art historian Geoff Archer, Jagger's statue lacks any overt emotion but still "hints at underlying feelings". Archer imagined that the soldier's home-knitted scarf was a gift from the writer of the letter, possibly a wife or a mother.

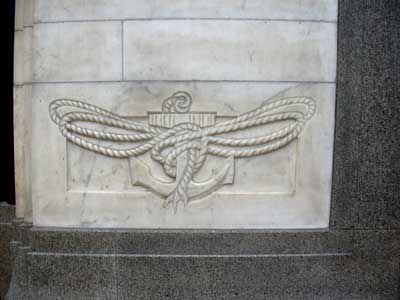
The Royal Navy badge

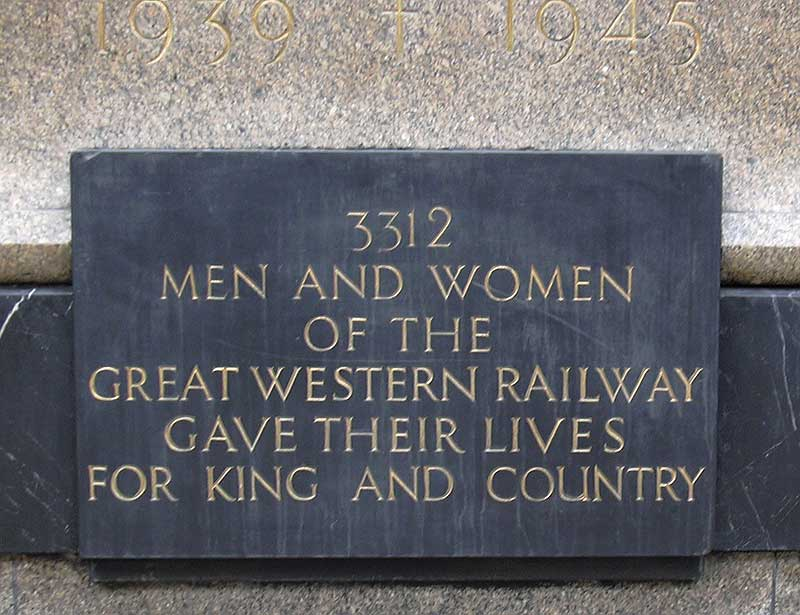
The inscription, updated to include Second World War casualties

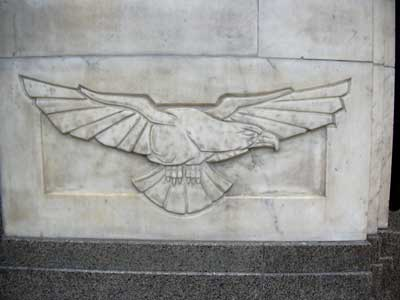
The RAF badge

== History ==
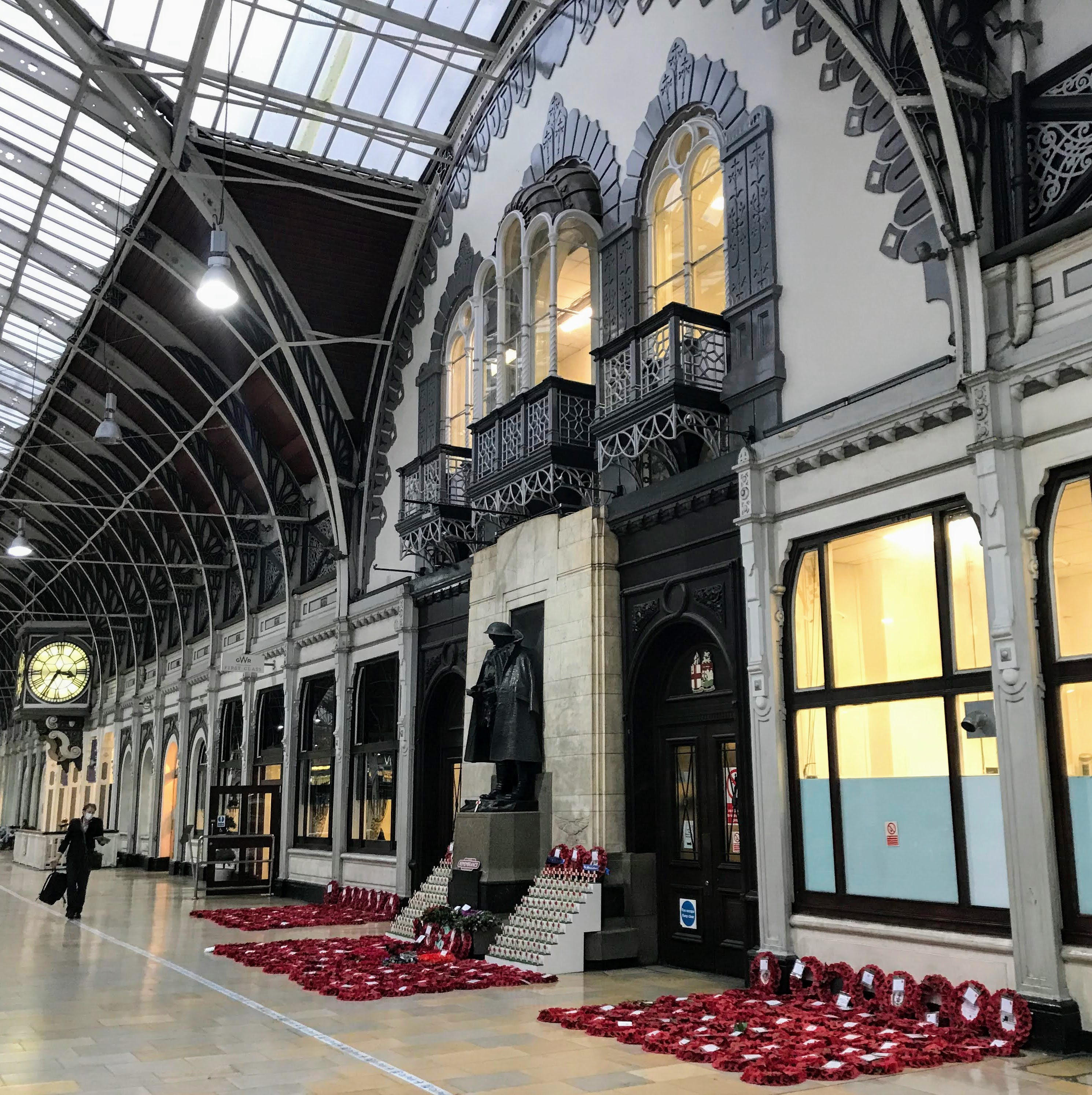
View along platform 1, showing the statue and Tait's architectural setting, with wreaths laid for Remembrance Sunday

The memorial was unveiled on 11 November 1922. Over 6,000 people gathered in the station to watch the ceremony, mostly invited guests who included GWR employees and relatives of those killed in the war, several of whom were brought in on special trains. To give such a large crowd a good view of the unveiling, the railway company built a stand on platforms 2 and 3 and across wagons moved into the tracks between the platforms. The ceremony began at 10:45 with an introduction from the rural dean of Paddington and hymns (including "Our God, Our Help in Ages Past"). The memorial was then unveiled by Victor Spencer, 1st Viscount Churchill, the GWR company chairman, who was accompanied by Randall Davidson, the Archbishop of Canterbury, and multiple company officials. Two minutes' silence was observed at 11:00. After the silence, the archbishop led prayers and the GWR officials gave speeches praising the workforce's efforts during the war. Viscount Churchill expressed his hope that the statue, reading a letter rather than bearing arms, would bring solace to people who had written to their loved ones who were fighting in the war. The ceremony concluded with the singing of the national anthem, "God Save the King", after which the GWR's general manager, Felix Pole, laid a floral tribute on behalf of the staff, and relatives of the dead were given time to view the memorial up close and lay their own tributes in front of it.

On 11 November 1949 the memorial was rededicated to commemorate the railway's casualties from World War II and the second inscription was added to the monument. Sir James Milne, the GWR's general manager throughout the Second World War, performed the ceremony.

In 1982, a close replica of Jagger's statue was unveiled outside the post office at Inglis Barracks in London to commemorate the centenary of the founding of the Army Post Office Corps (now the British Forces Post Office). The statue, by Jill Tweed, was unveiled by Queen Elizabeth II and moved to RAF Northolt in 2007 when the army unit responsible for it relocated.

Conservation work was undertaken on the metalwork of the memorial in 2001 to repair damage caused by environmental factors including carbon deposits from diesel trains. During the centenary of the First World War, the novelists Neil Bartlett and Kate Pullinger invited the public to write a letter to an unknown soldier, a project inspired by Jagger's statue. In 2020, during the COVID-19 pandemic when public gatherings were restricted and public transport use was diminished, the modern successor to the GWR carried poppy wreaths from across its network on trains to Paddington for Armistice Day (11 November). Local communities, representatives of the armed forces, and veterans' organisations laid wreaths on a train on its journey to London, symbolising the starting point of many soldiers' journeys in the First World War. Over 100 wreaths were laid from 60 stations, which were then laid by the memorial. The scheme was repeated in 2021.

As the memorial is indoors, it cannot be a listed building in its own right as is the case with many war memorials, but it is explicitly included in the grade I listing for Paddington station.

== See also ==
- Statue of Paddington Bear, another monument in Paddington station
