= Grade I listed buildings in Flintshire =

Flintshire shown within Wales

In the United Kingdom, the term listed building refers to a building or other structure officially designated as being of special architectural, historical, or cultural significance; Grade I structures are those considered to be "buildings of exceptional interest". Listing was begun by a provision in the Town and Country Planning Act 1947. Once listed, strict limitations are imposed on the modifications allowed to a building's structure or fittings. In Wales, the authority for listing under the Planning (Listed Buildings and Conservation Areas) Act 1990 rests with Cadw.

== Buildings ==
Name	Location Grid Ref. (Note: Sometimes known as OSGB36, the grid reference is based on the British national grid reference system used by the Ordnance Survey.) Geo-coordinates	Date Listed	Function	Notes	Reference Number	Image
St Deiniol's Ash	Hawarden; SJ3170466275; 53°11′21″N 3°01′25″W	14 February 1952	House	A large timber-framed and brick house with a central range dating from the late 1500s. Set back from the road in its own gardens.	3	Upload Photo
Hawarden Castle (18th century)	Hawarden; SJ3218665440; 53°10′54″N 3°00′58″W	14 February 1952	House	Set in its own park, to the E of the Old Castle, and with formalised gardens to the S.	4	See more images
Fferm Farmhouse	Leeswood; SJ2790960312; 53°08′06″N 3°04′44″W	14 February 1952	Farmhouse	Situated on the N side of the A541, approx. 0.25km to the E of Pontblyddyn.	5	See more images
Plas Teg	Hope; SJ2869759701; 53°07′47″N 3°04′02″W	14 February 1952	Country house	Prominently-sited, set-back from the main Wrexham to Mold road towards the NW border of the community and set into the gentle slope of the hill; accessed from the road via a pair of gated, sweeping drives.	7	See more images
Ewloe Castle	Hawarden; SJ2881967523; 53°12′00″N 3°04′01″W	2 July 1962	Castle	Situated in a wood overlooking the Wepre Brook.	13	See more images
Hawarden Castle (medieval)	Hawarden; SJ3194065349; 53°10′51″N 3°01′11″W	2 July 1962	Castle (ruined)	Ruined motte and bailey type castle, with restorations carried out in 1860s and 1920s.	14	See more images
Church of St Cyngar	Hope; SJ3096458387; 53°07′06″N 3°01′59″W	7 February 1962	Church	Prominently-sited on a raised circular Celtic Llan in the centre of the village.	27	See more images
Caergwrle Castle	Caergwrle; SJ3070257228; 53°06′28″N 3°02′12″W	2 July 1962	Castle	Strikingly-sited on a high natural hilltop site in the centre of Caergwrle; accessed via a path leading from the main road.	28	See more images
Leeswood Hall White Gates, screens and piers	Leeswood; SJ2501561538; 53°08′45″N 3°07′21″W	6 November 1962	Gates/railings	Situated on the N side of the by-road between Mold and Leeswood Village, situated at the terminus of axis of the landscaped avenue which slopes downhill from the NW facade of Leeswood Hall.	285	See more images
Church of St Mary	Cilcain; SJ1763765161; 53°10′38″N 3°14′02″W	6 November 1962	Church	Situated in an oval churchyard close to the centre of the village.	295	See more images
Golden Grove	Llanasa; SJ0890281513; 53°19′22″N 3°22′09″W	6 November 1962	House	In its own grounds on the N side of minor road between Llanasa and Gwaenysgor.	301	See more images
Church of St Eurgain and St Peter	Northop; SJ2463768486; 53°12′29″N 3°07′47″W	11 June 1962	Church	Prominently sited in the village at the corner of Church Road and Northop Road.	321	See more images
Church of St Beuno and St Mary	Whitford; SJ1461978183; 53°17′37″N 3°16′57″W	11 June 1962	Church	Located NW of the cross-roads in the centre of Whitford Village, and approached by lychgates to the S and E.	327	See more images
Parish Church of St Mary	Mold; SJ2369464165; 53°10′09″N 3°08′35″W	21 June 1953	Church	In a spacious churchyard on high ground at upper end of the High Street.	383	See more images
St Winefride's Chapel and Well	Holywell; SJ1850876269; 53°16′38″N 3°13′25″W	26 July 1951	Well	Chapel built c.1500-10 over the well associated with the martyrdom and miraculous restoration to life of St Winefride.	426	See more images
Basingwerk Abbey	Holywell; SJ1961177464; 53°17′17″N 3°12′26″W	19 August 1991	Abbey (ruined)	Near the N end of the Greenfield Valley.	505	See more images
Church of St Mary	Halkyn; SJ2091771169; 53°13′54″N 3°11′10″W	24 February 1983	Church	In a walled churchyard at the N end of Halkyn and opposite the Old School.	542	See more images
Pentrehobyn	Leeswood; SJ2496562425; 53°09′13″N 3°07′25″W	22 October 1952	House	Set in own grounds south-east of Mold and reached along short drive.	14882	See more images
Llettau at Pentrehobyn	Leeswood; SJ2500162423; 53°09′13″N 3°07′23″W	22 October 1952	Stone cells	Linked to the east side of Pentrehobyn House by a short screen wall.	17657	Upload Photo
Rhual	Mold; SJ2208164846; 53°10′30″N 3°10′02″W	22 October 1952	House	Small country house set within a landscaped park.	14883	See more images
Henblas	Llanasa; SJ1068381503; 53°19′22″N 3°20′33″W	22 October 1952	House	Approximately 100m NW of Llanasa church, on the S side of the Llanasa to Gwespyr road, set back from road behind a high forecourt wall.	14886	See more images
Gladstone's Library	Hawarden; SJ3145165919; 53°11′09″N 3°01′38″W	16 November 1994	Library	Also known as St Deiniol's Library. Set back from the road in its own walled grounds.	15025	See more images
Nerquis Hall	Nercwys; SJ2406360021; 53°07′55″N 3°08′11″W	22 October 1952	Country House	To the E of a subsidiary road leading from Mold to Treuddyn, approached via a tree-lined drive and facing a large forecourt.	15207	See more images
Broncoed Tower	Nercwys; SJ2402361951; 53°08′57″N 3°08′15″W	22 October 1952	House	Situated in its own park off the main N-S road from Mold by-passing the village.	15255	See more images
Flint Castle including revetment wall of ditch, Castle Dyke Street	Flint; SJ2470873344; 53°15′06″N 3°07′48″W	11 September 1995	Castle	To NE of town centre overlooking estuary of River Dee.	16403	See more images
Mostyn Hall	Mostyn; SJ1483380706; 53°18′59″N 3°16′48″W	22 October 1952	Hall	Surrounded by gardens and parkland and approached from the S driveway. The former gatehouse, Porth Mawr, is to the SW and a complex of farm buildings to the W.	21517	See more images
Porth Mawr (Great Gate), Mostyn Hall	Mostyn; SJ1481180660; 53°18′58″N 3°16′49″W	22 October 1952	Gatehouse	To the SW of Mostyn Hall.	21516	Porth Mawr (Great Gate), Mostyn Hall

== See also ==
- Grade II* listed buildings in Flintshire
- Listed buildings in Wales
