= Registered historic parks and gardens in Flintshire =

List of landscapes in county of Wales

Flintshire shown within Wales

Flintshire is a county in the north-east of Wales. It covers an area of 437.5 km^{2} (168.9 sq mi) and in 2021 the population was approximately 155,100.

The Cadw/ICOMOS Register of Parks and Gardens of Special Historic Interest in Wales was established in 2002 and given statutory status in 2022. It is administered by Cadw, the historic environment agency of the Welsh Government. It includes just under 400 sites, ranging from gardens of private houses, to cemeteries and public parks. Parks and gardens are listed at one of three grades, matching the grading system used for listed buildings. Grade I is the highest grade, for sites of exceptional interest; Grade II*, the next highest, denotes parks and gardens of more than special interest; while Grade II denotes nationally important sites of special interest.

There are 24 registered parks and gardens in Flintshire. Two are listed at grade I, six at grade II*, and 16 at grade II.

== List of parks and gardens ==
Grade	Criteria
I	Parks and gardens of exceptional interest
II*	Particularly important parks and gardens of more than special interest
II	Parks and gardens of national importance and special interest

List of parks and gardens
Name	Location Grid Ref. (Note: Sometimes known as OSGB36, the grid reference is based on the British national grid reference system used by the Ordnance Survey.) Geo-coordinates	Date Listed	Site type	Description / Notes	Grade	Reference Number	Image
Bryn Iorcyn	Llanfynydd; SJ2995456967; 53°06′18″N 3°02′47″W	1 February 2022	Garden	Gardens Utilitarian walled gardens with group value with the manor house and estate.	II	PGW(C)6(FLT)	
Bryngwyn Hall	Caerwys; SJ1025073874; 53°15′14″N 3°20′43″W	1 February 2022	Garden	Gardens Small late Victorial garden surrounding the hall, with parkland and a edwardian swimming pool.	II	PGW(C)4(FLT)	
Downing	Whitford; SJ1539078664; 53°17′52″N 3°16′11″W	1 February 2022	Landscape	Landscape Picturesque grounds associated with Thomas Pennant. Group value with nearby listed buildings.	II	PGW(C)3(FLT)	Downing
Fferm	Leeswood and Pontblyddyn; SJ2782060347; 53°08′06″N 3°04′44″W	1 February 2022	Garden	Gardens Almost complete complex of walled gardens, and group value with the Fferm farmhouse.	II	PGW(C)29(FLT)	Greyscale image of the Fferm farmhouse's entrance
Golden Grove	Llanasa; SJ0881681545; 53°19′22″N 3°22′09″W	1 February 2022	Garden	Gardens An edwardian terraced garden with a Yew topiary with remains of a 17th century walled garden and associated with Lady Aberconway, daughter of Henry Pochin. Group value with the listed nearby buildings.	II	PGW(C)31(FLT)	Golden Grove
Gwysaney	Mold; SJ2267866480; 53°11′22″N 3°09′26″W	1 February 2022	Park and gardens	Parks and gardens A park with origins as a 17th century deer park, with contemporary walling and trees, as well as a 19th century arboretum and the Victorian/Edwardian garden layout. Group value with nearby buildings such as Gwysaney Hall.	II*	PGW(C)43(FLT)	Gwysaney
Gyrn Castle	Llanasa; SJ1142181507; 53°19′22″N 3°19′48″W	1 February 2022	Woodlands and gardens	Gardens and Woodlands A 19th century picturesque landscape with a circuit walk and numerous lakes and woodlands. The gardens contain a rock garden and a terrace garden. Group value with nearby listed buildings.	II	PGW(C)33(FLT)	Gatehouse at Gyrn Castle
Halkyn Castle	Halkyn; SJ2085770949; 53°13′46″N 3°11′09″W	1 February 2022	Park and gardens	Parks and gardens Grounds have group value with the mansion. The park was first established in the 1820s-30s.	II	PGW(C)68(FLT)	Halkyn Castle
Hartsheath	Leeswood and Pontblyddyn; SJ2854760281; 53°08′05″N 3°04′05″W	1 February 2022	Park and gardens	Parks and gardens A small 19th century park with a terraced and informal garden. Group value with Hartsheath Hall.	II	PGW(C)21(FLT)	
Hawarden Castle	Hawarden; SJ3209765469; 53°10′54″N 3°00′58″W	1 February 2022	Park and gardens	Park Early 18th century landscape containing parks and gardens, including the ruins of a medieval castle.	I	PGW(C)55(FLT)	Post-medieval Hawarden Castle
Leeswood Hall	Leeswood and Pontblyddyn; SJ2516761400; 53°08′39″N 3°07′08″W	1 February 2022	Garden	Garden an 18th century transitional landscape designed by Stephen Switzer. Located in an irregularly shaped woodland to the northeast of the hall.	I	PGW(C)47(FLT)	Leeswood Hall from a distance
Lower Soughton Hall	Northop; SJ2470168000; 53°12′12″N 3°07′39″W	1 February 2022	Garden	Garden A garden designed by Sylvia Crowe, replacing an earlier garden.	II	PGW(C)18(FLT)	
Mostyn Hall	Whitford; SJ1473880734; 53°18′59″N 3°16′48″W	1 February 2022	Park and gardens	Parks, gardens and woodland Early 10th century park with drives, lodges, pathways such as the Marine Walk and group value with the listed hall.	II*	PGW(C)14(FLT)	Mostyn Hall from its front.
Nerquis Hall	Nercwys; SJ2397560051; 53°07′55″N 3°08′11″W	1 February 2022	Park and gardens	Parks and gardens Small landscape park and garden, with a nearby canal, and contemporary structures.	II	PGW(C)50(FLT)	Nercwys Hall from within woodlands
Pantasaph	Whitford; SJ1605375993; 53°16′26″N 3°15′32″W	1 February 2022	Garden	Gardens Roman Catholic set of buildings to the west of Holywell. It includes St David's Church and a Franciscan friary.	II	PGW(C)40(FLT)	Pantasaph Friary
Penbedw	Nannerch; SJ1606268872; 53°12′36″N 3°15′25″W	1 February 2022	Park and gardens	Park A landscape containing a grotto and summer house.	II*	PGW(C)7(FLT)	
Pentrehobyn	Nercwys; SJ2487762462; 53°09′13″N 3°07′25″W	1 February 2022	Park and gardens	Parks and gardens Remains of a 17th century garden and a small park, walled and terraced gardens as well as group value with the listed house nearby.	II	PGW(C)22(FLT)	
Perth-y-maen	Llanasa; SJ1243380705; 53°18′57″N 3°18′52″W	1 February 2022	Garden	Garden A 17th century walled garden, and group value with Berthymaen house.	II	PGW(C)71(FLT)	
Plas Teg	Hope; SJ2860159735; 53°07′47″N 3°04′02″W	1 February 2022	Courtyard and gardens	Courtyard and gardens A 17th century courtyard with a gazebo to a Jacobean house, and a walled garden.	II	PGW(C)24(FLT)	Plas Teg Hall
Rhual	Gwernaffield with Pantymwyn; SJ2199364878; 53°10′30″N 3°10′02″W	1 February 2022	Park and gardens	Forecourt A small landscape park with a walled forecourt and 17th century bowling green.	II*	PGW(C)45(FLT)	Rhual
Shotton Steelworks Garden	Sealand; SJ3120469427; 53°13′02″N 3°01′49″W	1 February 2022	Garden	Garden A formal garden and forecourt designed by Brenda Colvin as a space for office workers.	II	PGW(C)77(FLT)	Shotton Steelworks Garden
Soughton Hall	Northop; SJ2473067382; 53°11′52″N 3°07′37″W	1 February 2022	Park and gardens	Park Early 18th century parkland planting and group value with the listed hall.	II*	PGW(C)25(FLT)	Soughton Hall from its front.
Talacre	Llanasa; SJ1220484653; 53°21′04″N 3°19′09″W	1 February 2022	Park and gardens	Park Early 19th century pleasure grounds and plantations.	II*	PGW(C)38(FLT)	
Tower	Nercwys; SJ2392261972; 53°08′57″N 3°08′16″W	1 February 2022	Park and gardens	Parks and gardens Small park to the east of the Tower house, containing pasture fields.	II	PGW(C)46(FLT)	Tower

== See also ==
- List of scheduled monuments in Flintshire
- Grade I listed buildings in Flintshire
- Grade II* listed buildings in Flintshire
