= List of churches in Flintshire =

This is a list of churches in Flintshire, Wales.

== Active churches ==
Name	Community (settlement)	Dedication	Web	Founded	Denomination	Benefice	Notes
St. Cecilia's Church	Argoed (Mynydd Isa)	Cecilia		1892	Church in Wales	Borderlands Mission Area	Unique dedication in Wales
Village Temple Congregational Church	Argoed (Mynydd Isa)			1912	EFCC-AECW		
St James' Church, New Brighton	Argoed (New Brighton)	James			Church in Wales	Mold Mission Area	
SS Mary & Peter, Bagillt	Bagillt	Mary & Peter		1837-1838	Church in Wales	Estuary & Mountain Mission Area	
Bretton Methodist Church	Broughton & Bretton (Bretton)				Methodist	Chester & Delamere Forest MC	
St. Mary's Church	Broughton & Bretton (Broughton)	Mary		1823-1824	Church in Wales	Borderlands Mission Area	
St Michael, Brynford	Brynford	Michael		1851-1853	Church in Wales	Estuary & Mountain Mission Area	
Capel Coffa Cynfaen	Brynford (Calcoed)				Methodist	Cymru	
Emmanuel Church	Buckley	Jesus		1839-1842	Church in Wales	Borderlands Mission Area	
St Matthew, Buckley	Buckley	Matthew		1821-1822	Church in Wales	Borderlands Mission Area	Commissioners' church. Parish church 1874
All Saints, Buckley	Buckley	All Saints		pre-1892	Church in Wales	Borderlands Mission Area	Current building 1892
Our Lady of the Rosary, Buckley	Buckley	Mary		1915	Roman Catholic	Buckley	Moved from a church on Brunswick Road 2000
Buckley Cross Methodist Church	Buckley				Methodist	Buckley & Deeside Circuit	
Bistre English Methodist Church	Buckley				Methodist	Buckley & Deeside Circuit	
Pentrobin English Methodist Church	Buckley				Methodist	Buckley & Deeside Circuit	
St John's United Reformed Church, Buckley	Buckley	John ?			URC		
Bryn Methodist Church	Buckley (Alltami)				Methodist	Buckley & Deeside Circuit	First Primitive Methodist chapel in North Wales
The Good Shepherd, Drury	Buckley (Drury)	Jesus			Church in Wales	Borderlands Mission Area	
Drury Lane Methodist Church	Buckley (Drury)				Methodist	Buckley & Deeside Circuit	
St Michael's Church	Caerwys	Michael			Church in Wales	Denbigh Mission Area	
Bethel Chapel	Caerwys	Bethel			Presbyterian	Gofalaeth Prestatyn	
St Mary, Cilcain	Cilcain	Mary		Medieval	Church in Wales	Mold Mission Area	
Capel Gad, Cilcain	Cilcain	Gad ?			Presbyterian		
St John the Evangelist, Rhydymwyn	Cilcain (Rhydymwyn)	John the Evangelist		1861-1864	Church in Wales	Mold Mission Area	
St Mark, Connah's Quay	Connah's Quay	Mark		1836-1837	Church in Wales	Borderlands Mission Area	
St David, Connah's Quay	Connah's Quay	David		1914-1915	Church in Wales	Borderlands Mission Area	
Blessed Sacrament, Connah's Quay	Connah's Quay	Blessed Sacrament		1888	Roman Catholic	Connah's Quay & Queensferry	Building 1910–1911
St Andrew's English Methodist Church	Connah's Quay	Andrew			Methodist	Buckley & Deeside Circuit	
Golftyn Presbyterian Church, Connah's Quay	Connah's Quay				Presbyterian		
Quaystone Presbyt. Church, Connah's Quay	Connah's Quay				Presbyterian		
Connah's Quay Salvation Army	Connah's Quay				Salvation Army		
Hope Church Deeside	Ewloe			2021	Newfrontiers (Christcentral)		
SS Mary & David, Flint	Flint	Mary & David		Medieval	Church in Wales	Estuary & Mountain Mission Area	Rebuilt 1846–1848 by Poynter
Immaculate Conception, Flint	Flint	Immaculate Conception		1885	Roman Catholic	Flint Parish	
Emaus Methodist Church, Flint	Flint	Emmaus			Methodist	Buckley & Deeside Circuit	
Capel Caersalem, Flint	Flint	Jerusalem			Presbyterian		
St John's URC, Flint with Bagillt	Flint				URC		
Flint Evangelical Church	Flint			1974	AECW		
RiverDee Community Church	Flint				Assemblies of God		
St Thomas, Flint Mountain	Flint (Flint Mountain)	Thomas			Church in Wales	Estuary & Mountain Mission Area	
Capel Bethel, Flint Mountain	Flint (Flint Mountain)	Bethel			Methodist	Cymru	
Capel Bethel, Nant y Fflint	Flint (Nant y Fflint)	Bethel			Presbyterian		
Holy Trinity, Gwernaffield	Gwernaffield & Pantymwyn (Gwernaffield)	Trinity		1838	Church in Wales	Mold Mission Area	Rebuilt 1872
Ebenezer Baptist Church, Pantymwyn	Gwernaffield & Pantymwyn (Pantymwyn)				FIEC		Offshoot of Ebenezer Baptist, Mold
Church of St Mary the Virgin, Halkyn	Halkyn	Mary		Medieval	Church in Wales	Estuary & Mountain Mission Area	Current building 1878
Capel Salem, Pentre Halkyn	Halkyn (Pentre Halkyn)	Jerusalem			Methodist	Cymru	
Christ Church, Rhes-y-cae	Halkyn (Rhes-y-cae)	Jesus		1846	Church in Wales	Estuary & Mountain Mission Area	
St Paul, Rhosesmor	Halkyn (Rhosesmor)	Paul		1874-1876	Church in Wales	Estuary & Mountain Mission Area	
St Deiniol, Hawarden	Hawarden	Deiniol		Medieval	Church in Wales	Borderlands Mission Area	Restored after a fire 1859
Sacred Heart, Hawarden	Hawarden	Sacred Heart		1966-1967	Roman Catholic	Hawarden	Congregation probably older
Holy Spirit, Ewloe	Hawarden (Ewloe)	Holy Spirit		1937-1938	Church in Wales	Borderlands Mission Area	
Highway Methodist Church, Ewloe	Hawarden (Ewloe)				Methodist	Buckley & Deeside Circuit	
Ewloe Green Presbyterian Church	Hawarden (Ewloe Green)				Presbyterian		
Mancot Presbyterian Church	Hawarden (Mancot)				Presbyterian		
St Francis, Sandycroft	Hawarden (Sandycroft)	Francis of Assisi		1876	Church in Wales	Borderlands Mission Area	In school until building 1913. Serves Queensferry
All Saints, Higher Kinnerton	Higher Kinnerton	All Saints		1893	Church of England		
St James the Apostle, Holywell	Holywell	James		Medieval	Church in Wales	Estuary & Mountain Mission Area	Rebuilt 1769 & dedication changed from St Winifred
St Peter, Holywell	Holywell	Peter			Church in Wales	Estuary & Mountain Mission Area	
St Winefride, Holywell	Holywell	Winifred		1832	Roman Catholic	Holywell	Founded by the Jesuits
Capel Bethel, Holywell	Holywell	Bethel		c. 1814	Baptist Union		Current building 1820
Capel Penbryn, Holywell	Holywell				Presbyterian		
Capel Carmel, Holywell	Holywell	Mount Carmel			Presbyterian		
Moriah Presbyterian Church, Holywell	Holywell	Moriah			Presbyterian		Uses building of Welsh-speaking Capel Penbryn
Tabernacle United Ref. Church, Holywell	Holywell	Tabernacle			URC		
Holywell Evangelical Church	Holywell				Independent		
Holy Trinity, Greenfield	Holywell (Greenfield)	Trinity		1870-1871	Church in Wales	Estuary & Mountain Mission Area	
St Cynfarch, Hope	Hope	Cynfarch		Medieval	Church in Wales	Borderlands Mission Area	
Caergwrle Methodist Church	Hope (Caergwrle)				Methodist	Wrexham Circuit	
Caergwrle Presbyterian Church	Hope (Caergwrle)				Presbyterian		
Caergwrle Evangelical Church	Hope (Caergwrle)			1972	AECW		
Bethania Baptist Church, Leeswood	Leeswood & Pontblyddyn (Leeswood)	Bethany			Baptist Union GB		Listed on both BUGB and BUW websites
Leeswood Methodist Church	Leeswood & Pontblyddyn (Leeswood)				Methodist	Buckley & Deeside Circuit	
Christ Church, Pontblyddyn	Leeswood & Pontblyddyn (Pontblyddyn)	Jesus		1836	Church in Wales	Mold Mission Area	
SS Asaph & Cyndeyrn, Llanasa	Llanasa	Asaph & Mungo		Medieval	Church in Wales	Llanasa & Ffynnongroew	
All Saints, Ffynnongroew	Llanasa (Ffynnongroew)	All Saints		1881	Church in Wales	Llanasa & Ffynnongroew	
Capel Bethel, Gronant	Llanasa (Gronant)	Bethel			Methodist	Cymru	
St Michael, Llanfynydd	Llanfynydd	Michael		1843	Church in Wales	Borderlands Mission Area	Rebuilt 1892, dedication changed from Christ Church
All Saints, Cymau	Llanfynydd (Cymau)	All Saints		1870	Church in Wales	Borderlands Mission Area	
Capel Bethesda, Cymau	Llanfynydd (Cymau)	Pool of Bethesda			Presbyterian		
St Mary, Mold	Mold	Mary		Medieval	Church in Wales	Mold Mission Area	
St David, Mold	Mold	David of Wales		1862-1863	Roman Catholic	Mold	Current building 1966
Mold Methodist Church	Mold				Methodist	Buckley & Deeside Circuit	
Capel Bethesda, Mold	Mold	Pool of Bethesda			Presbyterian		
Tyddyn Street United Church, Mold	Mold			1857	URC / PCW		1997 merger of URC and PCW churches
Ebenezer Baptist Church, Mold	Mold	Eben-Ezer			FIEC		
King's Christian Centre	Mold			pre-2000	Independent		Bought Capel Pendref (prev. Methodist, 1828) in 2000
Hebron United Reformed Church, Mostyn	Mostyn	Hebron			URC		
Christ Church, Mostyn	Mostyn (Glan-y-don)	Jesus		1844-1845	Church in Wales	Estuary & Mountain Mission Area	
St Michael & All Angels, Nannerch	Nannerch	Michael & Angels		Medieval	Church in Wales	Mold Mission Area	Rebuilt 1852–1853
St Mary, Nercwys	Nercwys	Mary		Medieval	Church in Wales	Mold Mission Area	
Capel Soar, Nercwys	Nercwys	Zoara			Presbyterian		
SS Eurgain & Peter, Northop	Northop	Eigen & Peter		Medieval	Church in Wales	Mold Mission Area	
Northop United Reformed Church	Northop				URC		
St Mary, Northop Hall	Northop Hall	Mary		1911-1912	Church in Wales	Mold Mission Area	
Northop Hall Methodist Church	Northop Hall				Methodist	Buckley & Deeside Circuit	
Northop Hall Presbyterian Church	Northop Hall				Presbyterian		
Emmanuel, Penyffordd	Penyffordd	Jesus		1881	Church in Wales	Borderlands Mission Area	Current building 1959
St John the Baptist, Penmynydd	Penyffordd	John the Baptist		1843	Church in Wales	Borderlands Mission Area	Product of the Camden Society
Trinity Church, Penyffordd	Penyffordd	Trinity			Methodist / PCW	Buckley & Deeside Circuit	
Capel Gwynfa, Penyffordd	Penyffordd			1898	Presbyterian		First building 1905
The Blessed Trinity, Queensferry	Queensferry	Trinity			Roman Catholic	Connah's Quay & Queensferry	
Sandycroft Methodist Church	Queensferry (Sandycroft)				Methodist	Buckley & Deeside Circuit	
St Anthony of Padua, Saltney	Saltney	Anthony of Padua		1862	Roman Catholic	Saltney & Broughton	First building (school chapel) 1878, new building 1914
St Bartholomew, Sealand	Sealand	Bartholomew		1865-1867	Church in Wales	Borderlands Mission Area	
St Andrew, Queensferry	Sealand (Garden City)	Andrew		pre-1900	Church in Wales	Borderlands Mission Area	Current building 1962
St Ethelwold, Shotton	Shotton	Ethelwold ?		1898-1902	Church in Wales	Borderlands Mission Area	
Bethel Baptist Church, Shotton	Shotton	Bethel			Baptist Union GB		
Rivertown United Reformed Church	Shotton				URC		
Christ Church Deeside	Shotton	Jesus		1975	AECW		
St Michael & All Angels, Trelawnyd	Trelawnyd & Gwaenysgor	Michael & Angels		Medieval	Church in Wales	Dyserth, Trelawnyd, Cwm	Present structure 1724
Capel Nasareth, Trelawnyd	Trelawnyd & Gwaenysgor	Nazareth			Presbyterian	Gofalaeth Prestatyn	
St Mary Magdalene, Gwaenysgor	Trelawnyd & Gwaenysgor	Mary Magdalene			Church in Wales	Meliden & Gwaenysgor	
Capel Rehoboth, Gwaenysgor	Trelawnyd & Gwaenysgor	Rehoboth			Methodist	Cymru	
St Mary, Treuddyn	Treuddyn	Mary		Medieval	Church in Wales	Mold Mission Area	Rebuilt 1874–1875
Capel Ebeneser, Treuddyn	Treuddyn	Eben-Ezer			Methodist	Cymru	
Capel y Rhos, Treuddyn	Treuddyn				Presbyterian		
SS Mary & Beuno, Whitford	Whitford	Mary & Beuno		Medieval	Church in Wales	Estuary & Mountain Mission Area	
Capel Sion, Lloc	Whitford (Carmel)				Methodist	Cymru	
St Paul, Gorsedd	Whitford (Gorsedd)	Paul		1852-1853	Church in Wales	Estuary & Mountain Mission Area	
St David, Pantasaph	Whitford (Pantasaph)	David of Wales		1849-1852	Roman Catholic	Pantasaph	Part of Pantasaph Franciscan Friary
St Mary, Ysceifiog	Ysceifiog	Mary		1836-1837	Church in Wales	Estuary & Mountain Mission Area	
Capel y Berthen, Lixwm	Ysceifiog (Lixwm)			1776	Presbyterian		

== Defunct churches ==
Name	Community (settlement)	Dedication	Web	Founded	Redundant	Denomination	Notes
Our Lady of Lourdes, Bagillt	Bagillt	Mary				Roman Catholic	
St John's Methodist Church, Connah's Quay	Connah's Quay	John ?			pre-2013	Methodist	Flats planning application 2013
St Michael & All Angels, Mancot Royal	Hawarden (Mancot)	Michael & Angels				Church in Wales	
New Life Church, Holywell	Holywell						Sudden collapse after failed building project & pastor's departure, 2014
St John the Evangelist, Mold	Mold	John the Evangelist		1878-1879		Church in Wales	
St Matthew, Saltney	Saltney	Matthew		1911	2004	Church of England	Burned down 2008. Parent church St Mark's Saltney is in England
