= Henblas =

Henblas may refer to:

- Henblas, Anglesey, a village with an eponymous Grade II* listed house
  - Henblas Burial Chamber, a Neolithic dolmen
- Henblas, Llanasa, Flintshire, a Grade I listed house
- Henblas, Llangedwyn, Powys, a Grade II* listed house
- Henblas, Tremeirchion, Denbighshire, a Grade II* listed house
- Henblas Street, Wrexham, street in Wrexham
