= Henblas, Llanasa =

Grade I listed building in Flintshire, UK

Henblas
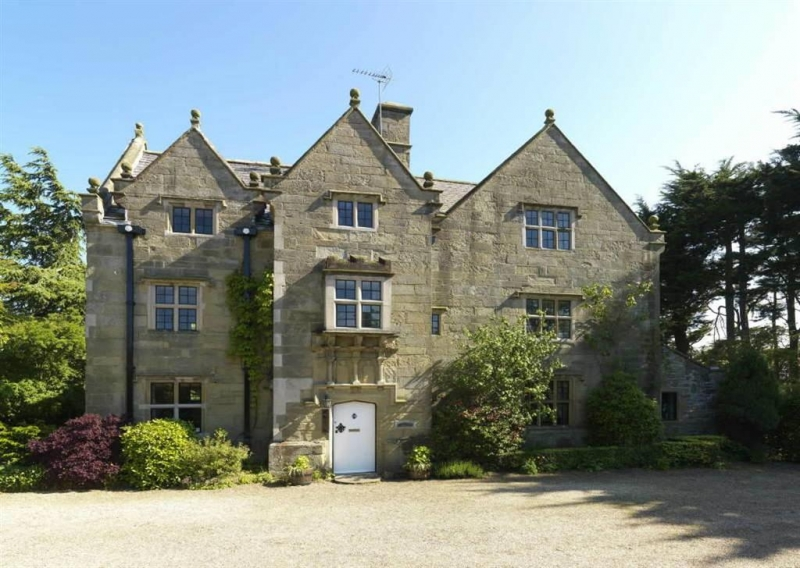
- The entrance front

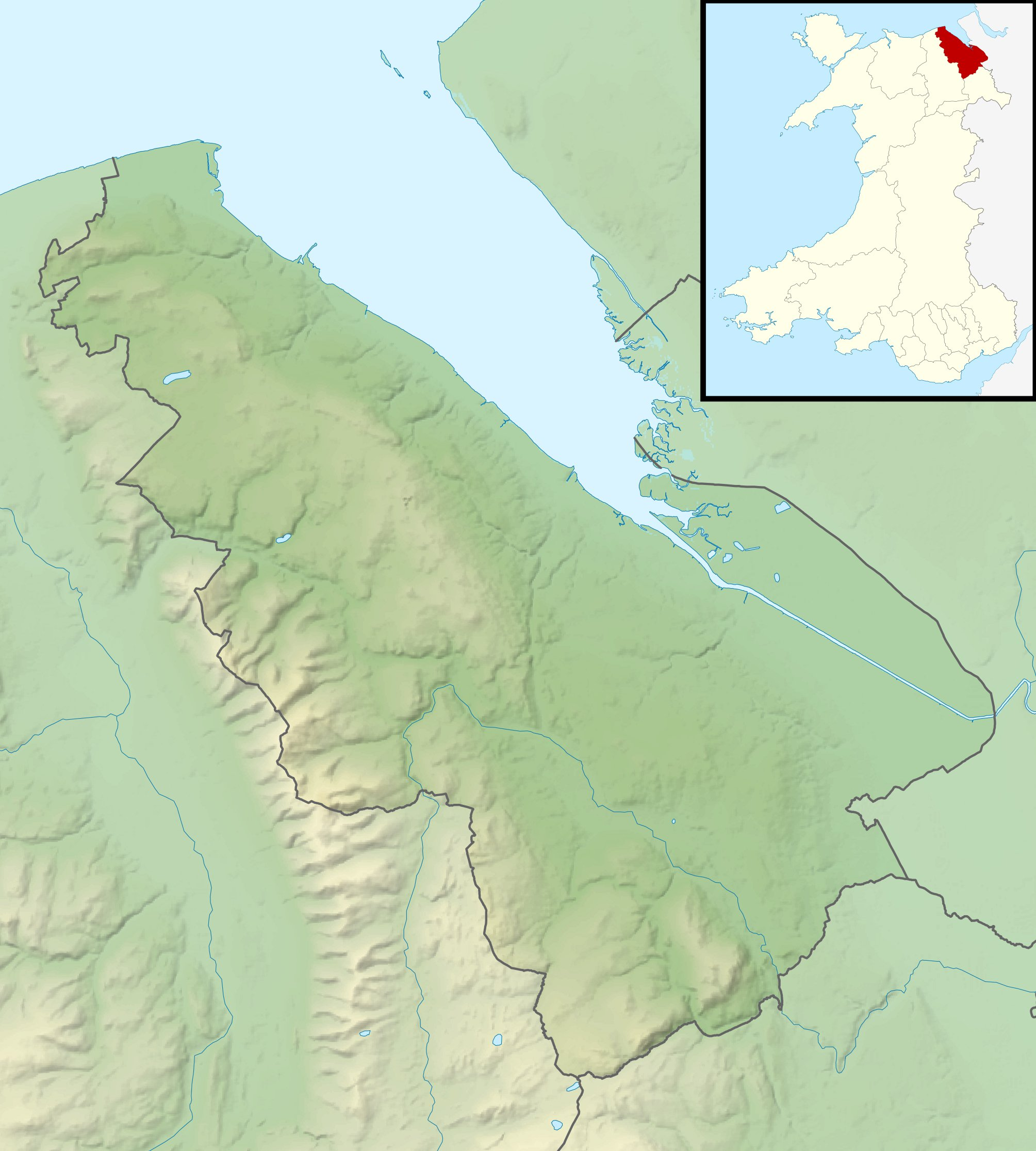
- Location within Flintshire
- 53.3229°N 3.3424°W
- Type: House
- Location: Llanasa, Flintshire, Wales

History
- Built: 1645

Site notes
- Architectural style: Renaissance
- Governing body: Privately owned

Listed Building – Grade I
- Official name: Henblas
- Designated: 22 October 1952
- Reference no.: 14886

Listed Building – Grade II
- Official name: Henblas Lodge
- Designated: 30 April 2001
- Reference no.: 25113

Henblas is a Renaissance house in the village of Llanasa, Flintshire, Wales. The mansion dates from 1645 and was built by the Morgan family of Golden Grove, a country estate to the west of Llanasa, as a home for two unmarried sisters. The house is designated by Cadw as a Grade I listed building.

== History ==
Tradition links an earlier house on the site of Henblas to Gruffudd Fychan II, father of Owain Glyndŵr. A carved stone set into the gable end of the existing house carries a verse in Welsh, which translates as "I grew trees round thee to get thee ready for me", and which has been attributed to Gruffudd Fychan, who is reputedly buried in the church at the Church of St Asaph and St Cyndeyrn in the village, although this is uncertain. The present house was built by the Morgans of Golden Grove, a country estate to the west of Llanasa, as a home for two unmarried sisters.

In the 20th century Henblas was owned by Dennis Vosper, Baron Runcorn, the Member of Parliament (MP) for Runcorn, Cheshire, who restored the house in the 1960s. The house was sold in 2014 and again in 2020 and remains a private residence which is not open to the public.

== Architecture and description ==
Henblas is of three storeys with a central three-storey bay and two receding wings. Edward Hubbard in his Clwyd volume in the Buildings of Wales series, describes it as a "fine-looking house". It is built to a double-pile plan, and an impressive Jacobean dog-leg stair leads to the upper storeys. The whole of the third-floor right-hand wing is occupied by a long gallery. The Royal Commission on the Ancient and Historical Monuments of Wales (RCAHMW) notes the quality of the plasterwork ceilings.

Henblas is a Grade I listed building. Its lodge is listed at Grade II.

== Sources ==
- Hubbard, Edward (2003). Clwyd (Denbighshire and Flintshire). The Buildings of Wales. New Haven and London: Yale University Press. ISBN 978-0-300-09627-9. OCLC 315792534.
