= St Cyngar's Church, Hope =

Church in Flintshire, Wales

St Cyngar's Church
- St Cynfarch and St Cyngar's Church
- Hope Parish Church
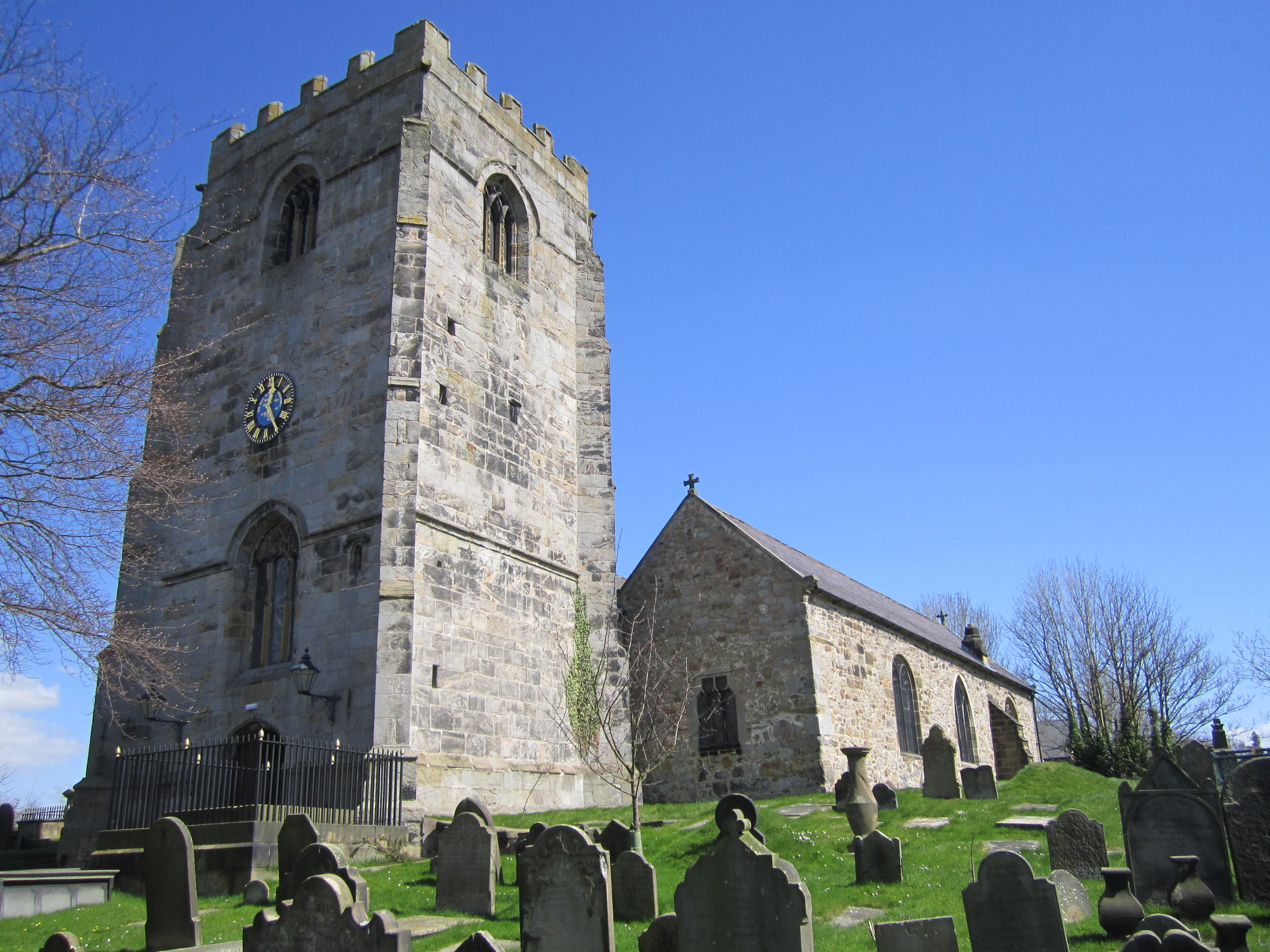
- The church's tower and its western end
- St Cyngar's Church
- 53.1182°N 3.03295°W
- Location: Hope, Flintshire
- Address: Hawarden Road, Hope LL12 9NG
- Country: Wales
- Denomination: Church in Wales
- Website: hopeparishchurch.org

History
- Dedication: Cynfarch and Cyngar

Architecture
- Years built: Twelfth century

Administration
- District: Rhos-a-Mynydd Mission Area
- Diocese: Diocese of St Asaph

Listed Building – Grade I
- Official name: Church of St Cyngar
- Designated: 7 February 1962; Amended 6 May 1998
- Reference no.: 27

St Cynfarch and St Cyngar's Church, or simply St Cyngar's Church, or Hope Parish Church, is a Grade I listed parish church located in Hope, Flintshire, Wales. The Church in Wales church is dedicated to the Celtic saints Cynfarch and Cyngar. It is considered to be Flintshire's oldest church.

== Background and congregation ==
The church is located in Hope, Flintshire. The church building is located prominently within a raised circular Celtic llan in the centre of Hope. It has served as the historical centre point of the local community, therefore serving as a centre for communal events in the village.

Operationally it is located in the Rhos-a-Mynydd Mission Area within the Diocese of St Asaph of the Church in Wales. It operates alongside the Emmanuel Church in Penyffordd.

It is dedicated to the Celtic saints Cynfarch of the fifth century, and Cyngar of the sixth century, with both being descendants of Cunedda. Although dedicated to both saints, it has been sometimes described as to only be dedicated to only one of the two at various times. In particular, its dedication to Cynfarch has been occasionally forgotten, with the church sometimes described as only named after St. Cyngar. Additionally, the church being connected to Cynfarch has been disputed, with historical references regularly omitting the saint.

== History ==
The current church has its origins to the twelfth century, with a small stone church known to have been constructed in the late twelfth century. These twelfth-century structures now form the south aisle and around the font. A church on this site was mentioned by 1254. Churches by this time were likely of a wooden construction. These were damaged during the Edwardian conquest. Parts of the current church date to the 1280s, although the oldest part dates to 1180. Remains of a Celtic cross have suggested it may have served as a place of worship since the ninth or tenth centuries.

In the thirteenth and fourteenth centuries, the church was gradually extended, eastwards and westwards respectively. Between 1490 and 1500, it was extended northwards and its tower was first added in c. 1500, constructed over three stages, completing in 1568.

The church is considered the oldest church in Flintshire. It has strong ties with the Trevor family of Plas Teg hall, with the church's south aisle becoming the Trevor Chapel in the early seventeenth century.

== Structure ==
The building has a Perpendicular double-naved appearance with a sixteenth-century tower. The tower is battlemented and located to the west. It is made of local freestone and sandstone rubble and dressings, with slate roofs.

The church's tower was first built in c. 1500, as an independent structure in three stages. It was joined to the nave between 1520 and 1560. It houses a bell chamber and a clock mechanism. Above them is a ring of six bells, serving as a World War I memorial, constructed in 1921.

The church's large east window illustrating Te Deum comprises fragments that were put back together in 1730 from the remains of ancient glass.

The side chapel was reconstructed in 2000, following the development of dry rot threatening the church's structure. During the same restoration, remains of a Celtic cross were discovered suggesting the site has been a place of worship since the ninth or tenth centuries.

The church building is a Grade I listed building. While the church's railed tombs, steps and walls, sundial base, vault, and gates are Grade II listed.

== See also ==
- List of churches in Flintshire
- Grade I listed buildings in Flintshire
