= Henblas Burial Chamber =

Neolithic tomb in Anglesey, Wales

Henblas
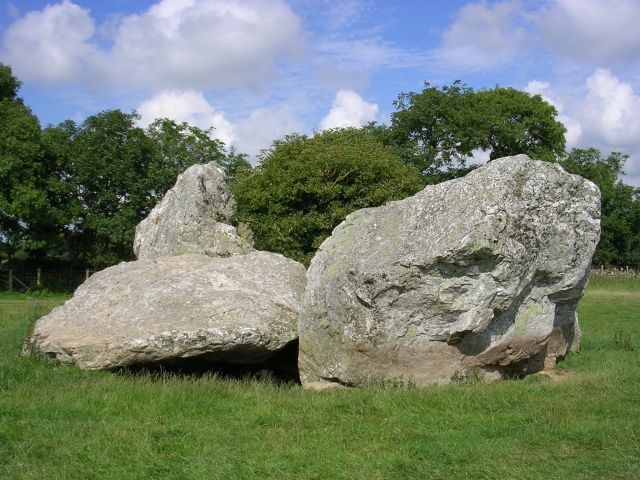

- Location within Anglesey
- 53°13′16″N 4°21′29″W
- Type: Dolmen
- Periods: Neolithic
- Location: Anglesey

Henblas Burial Chamber is a Neolithic dolmen located in Henblas, to the southwest of Llangristiolus, Anglesey, Wales.

== Description ==
The structure consists of a pair of large quartz-rich boulders, measuring about 4.1 and 3 metres (13.5 and 9.8 ft) in height with circumferences of 15.3 and 16.8 metres (50 and 55 ft) respectively, with a large slab lying between them, measuring 5.5 by 4.7 metres (18 by 15 ft), which has been interpreted as being the former capstone. The boulders appear to be in their original positions.

The capstone appears to have scratch marks on them, which do not match the direction of the known ice flows in the area, indicating that there has been some human interference.
