= Leeswood and Pontblyddyn =

Community in Flintshire, Wales

Coordinates: 53°08′N 3°07′W

Leeswood and Pontblyddyn: Welsh: Coed-llai a Pontblyddyn
- Community
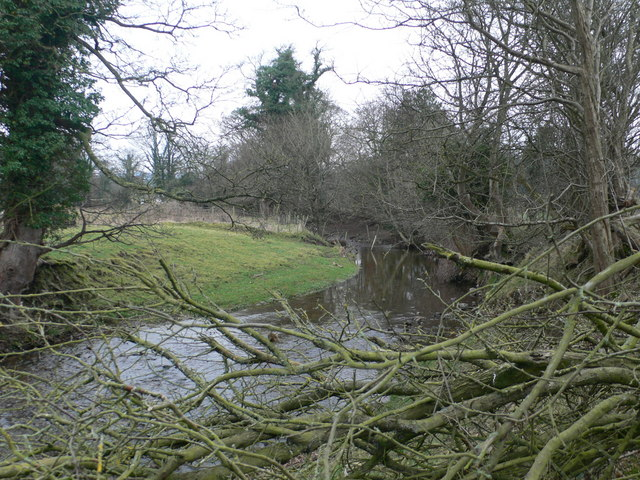
- The river Terrig, near Leeswood Old Hall

- Location within Flintshire
- Population: 2,123 (2021)
- OS grid reference: SJ260614
- Principal area: Flintshire
- Preserved county: Clwyd
- Country: Wales
- Sovereign state: United Kingdom
- Settlements: List: Leeswood; Padeswood; Pontblyddyn
- Post town: Mold
- Postcode district: CH7
- Dialling code: 01352
- Police: North Wales
- Fire: North Wales
- Ambulance: Welsh
- UK Parliament: Clwyd East
- Senedd Cymru – Welsh Parliament: Delyn
- Website: Community website
- List of places UK Wales Flintshire Map of the community

Leeswood and Pontblyddyn (Welsh: Coed-llai a Pontblyddyn) is a community in Flintshire, Wales in the United Kingdom, including the villages of Leeswood and Pontblyddyn.

The council was known as Leeswood Community Council before 26 January 2016. It is made of 11 elected councillors, 9 representing the Leeswood ward and 2 representing Pontblyddyn.

The community covers the same area as the Leeswood electoral ward of Flintshire County Council, which elects one councillor.
