= Jacobean architecture =

English architecture around the reign of James I

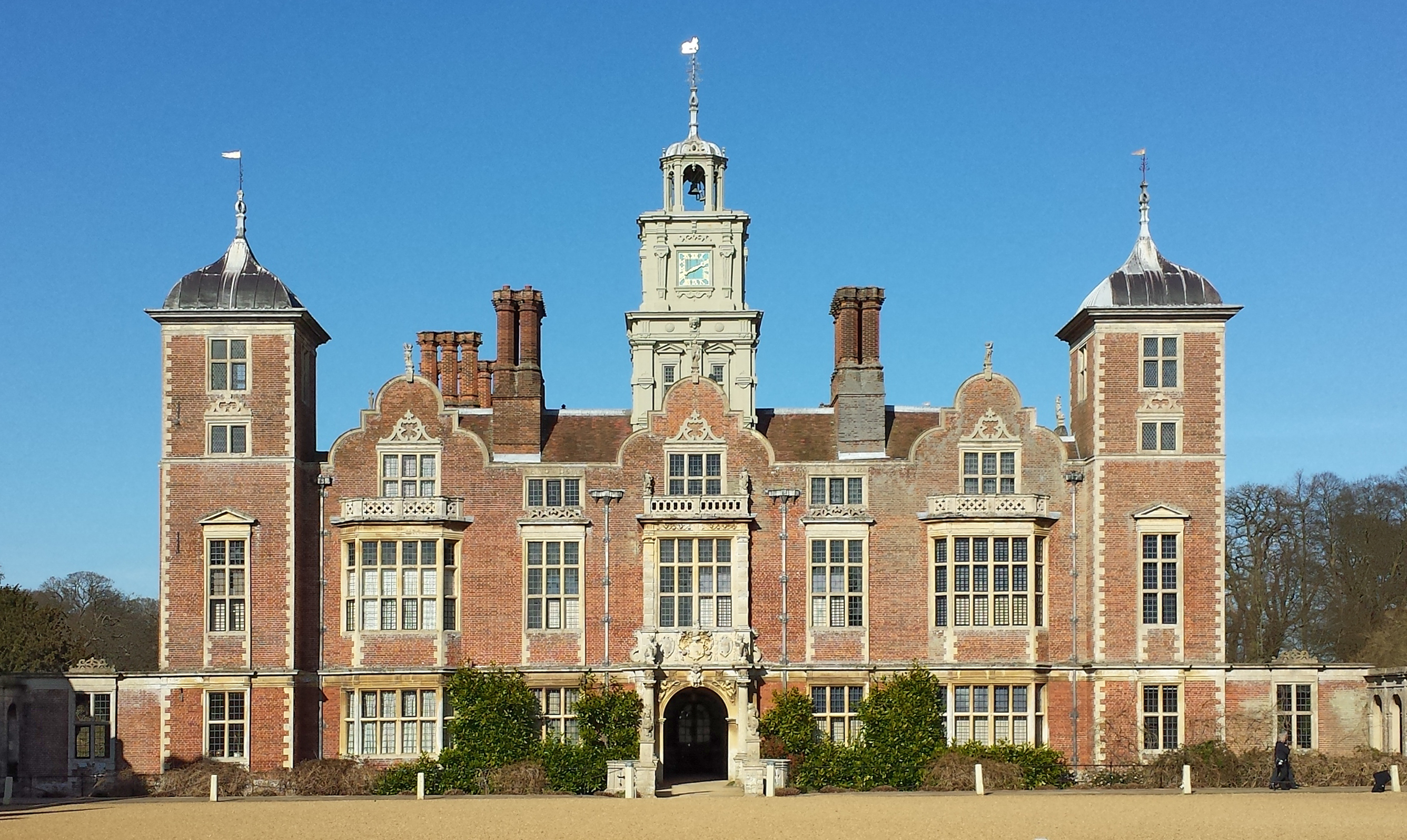
Blickling Hall, Norfolk (c. 1619–27)

The Jacobean style is the second phase of Renaissance architecture in England, following the Elizabethan style. It is named after King James VI and I, with whose reign (1603–1625 in England) it is associated. At the start of James's reign, there was little stylistic break in architecture, as Elizabethan trends continued their development. However, his death in 1625 came as a decisive change towards more classical architecture with Italian influence, led by Inigo Jones. The style this began is sometimes called Stuart architecture, or English Baroque (though the latter term may be regarded as starting later).

Courtiers continued to build large prodigy houses, even though James spent less time on summer progresses around his realm than Elizabeth had. The influence of Flemish and German Northern Mannerism increased, now often executed by recruited craftsmen and artists, rather than obtained from books as in the previous reign. There continued to be very little building of new churches, although there was a considerable amount of modifications to old ones and a great deal of secular building.

== Characteristics ==
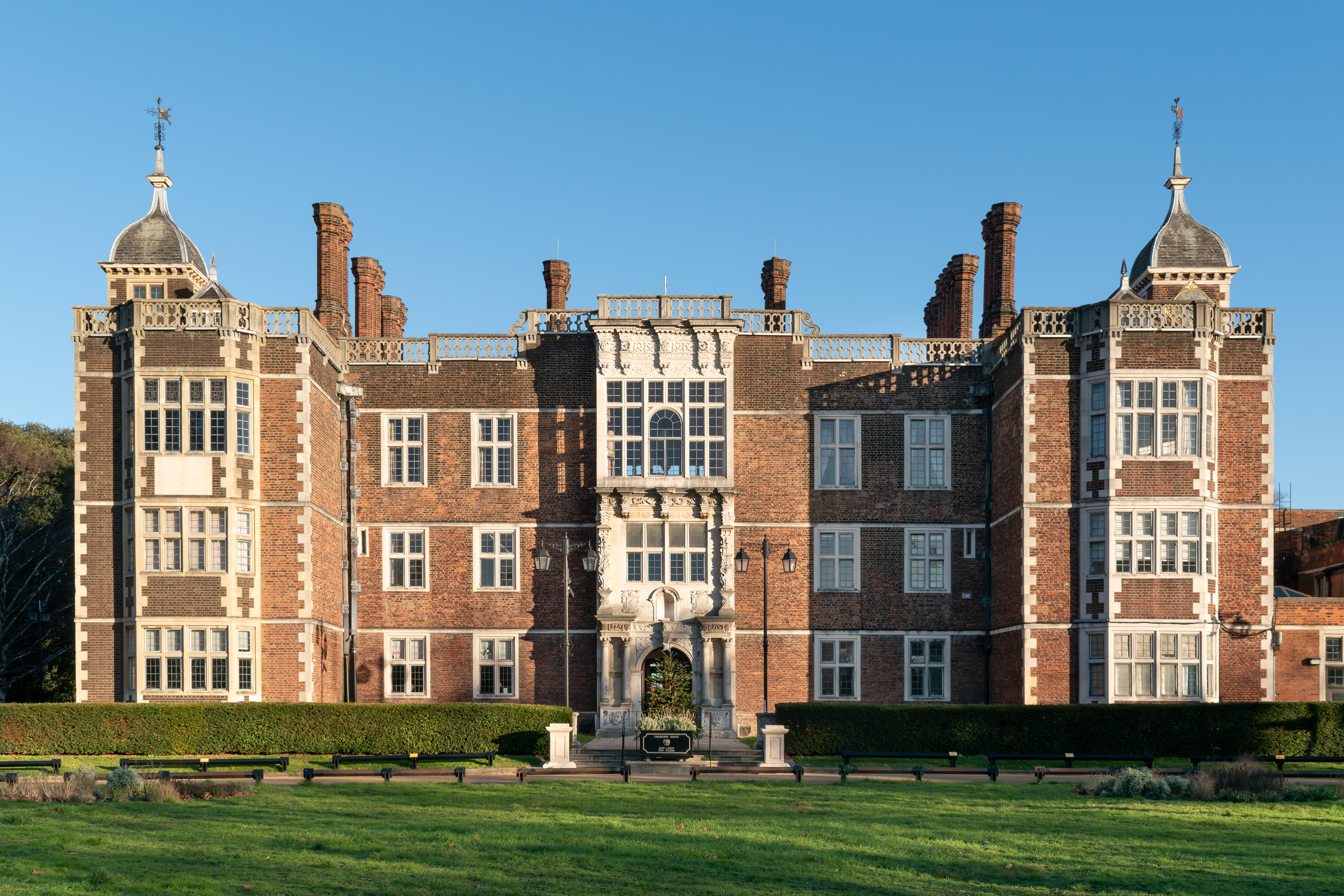
Charlton House, Greenwich (1607-12)

The reign of James VI of Scotland (also James I of England from 1603 to 1625), a disciple of the new scholarship, saw the first decisive adoption of Renaissance motifs in a free form communicated to England through German and Flemish carvers rather than directly from Italy. Although the general lines of Elizabethan design remained, there was a more consistent and unified application of formal design, both in plan and elevation. Much use was made of columns and pilasters, round-arch arcades, and flat roofs with openwork parapets. These and other classical elements appeared in a free and fanciful vernacular rather than with any true classical purity. With them were mixed the prismatic rustications and ornamental detail of scrolls, straps, and lozenges also characteristic of Elizabethan design. The style influenced furniture design and other decorative arts.

== History and examples ==
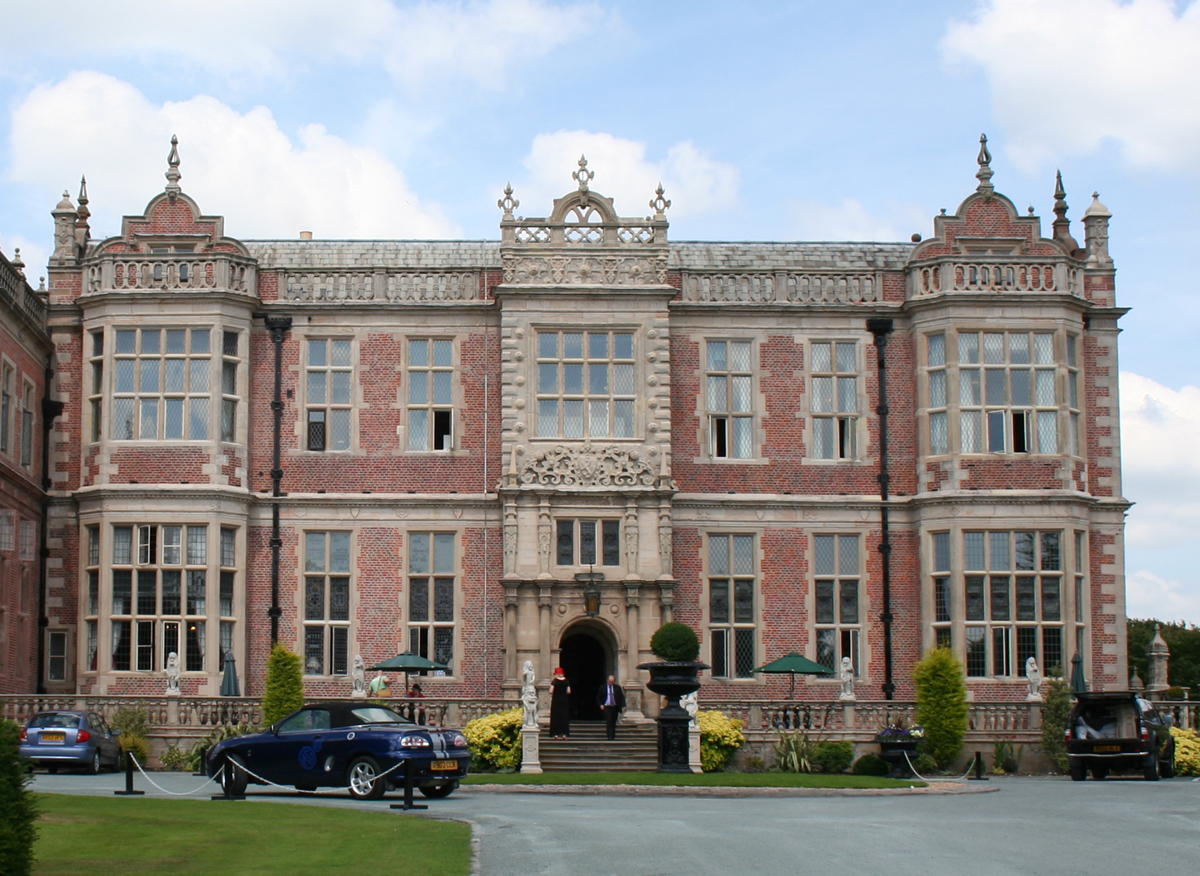
The Jacobean east wing of Crewe Hall, Cheshire, built in 1615–36

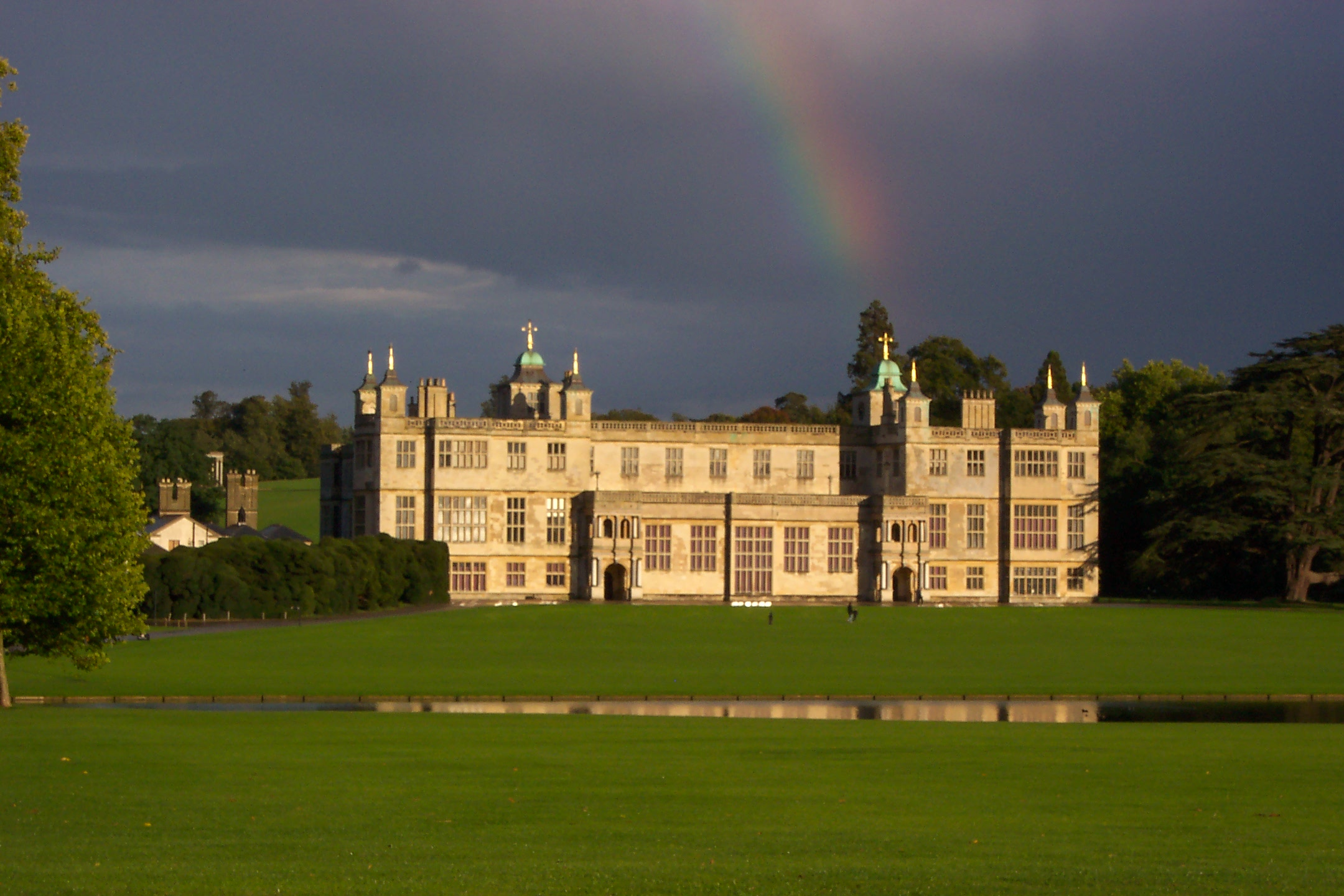
Audley End House, Essex (1614)

Reproductions of the Classical orders had already found their way into English architecture during the reign of Queen Elizabeth I, frequently based upon John Shute's The First and Chief Grounds of Architecture, published in 1563, with two other editions in 1579 and 1584. In 1577, three years before the commencement of Wollaton Hall, a copybook of the orders was brought out in Antwerp by Hans Vredeman de Vries. Although nominally based on the description of the orders by Vitruvius, the author indulged freely not only in his rendering of them, but in suggestions of his own, showing how the orders might be employed in various buildings. Those suggestions were of a most decadent type, so that even the author deemed it advisable to publish a letter from a canon of the Church, stating that there was nothing in his architectural designs that was contrary to religion. It is to publications of this kind that Jacobean architecture owes the perversion of its forms and the introduction of strap work and pierced crestings, which appear for the first time at Wollaton Hall (1580); at Bramshill House, Hampshire (1607–1612), and in Holland House, Kensington (1624), it receives its fullest development.

Hatfield House, built in its entirety by Robert Cecil, 1st Earl of Salisbury, between 1607 and 1611, is an example of the later extension of the Elizabethan prodigy house, with turreted Tudor-style wings at each end with their mullioned windows but the two wings linked by an Italianate Renaissance facade. This central facade, originally an open loggia, has been attributed to Inigo Jones himself; however, the central porch carries a heavier quasi-gatehouse emphasis, so the attribution is probably false. Inside the house, the elaborately carved staircase demonstrates the Renaissance influence on English ornament.

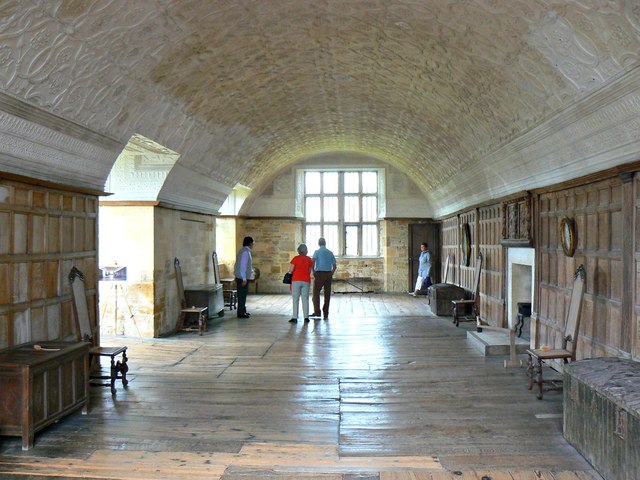
Chastleton House, Oxon, Long Gallery

Other Jacobean buildings of note are Aston Hall, Birmingham; Audley End House, Essex; Bank Hall in Bretherton; Castle Bromwich Hall near Solihull; Charlton House in Charlton, London; Chastleton House in Oxfordshire; Crewe Hall, Cheshire; Holland House, London by John Thorpe; Knole House, near Sevenoaks in Kent; Lilford Hall in Northamptonshire; and Plas Teg near Pontblyddyn in Wales.

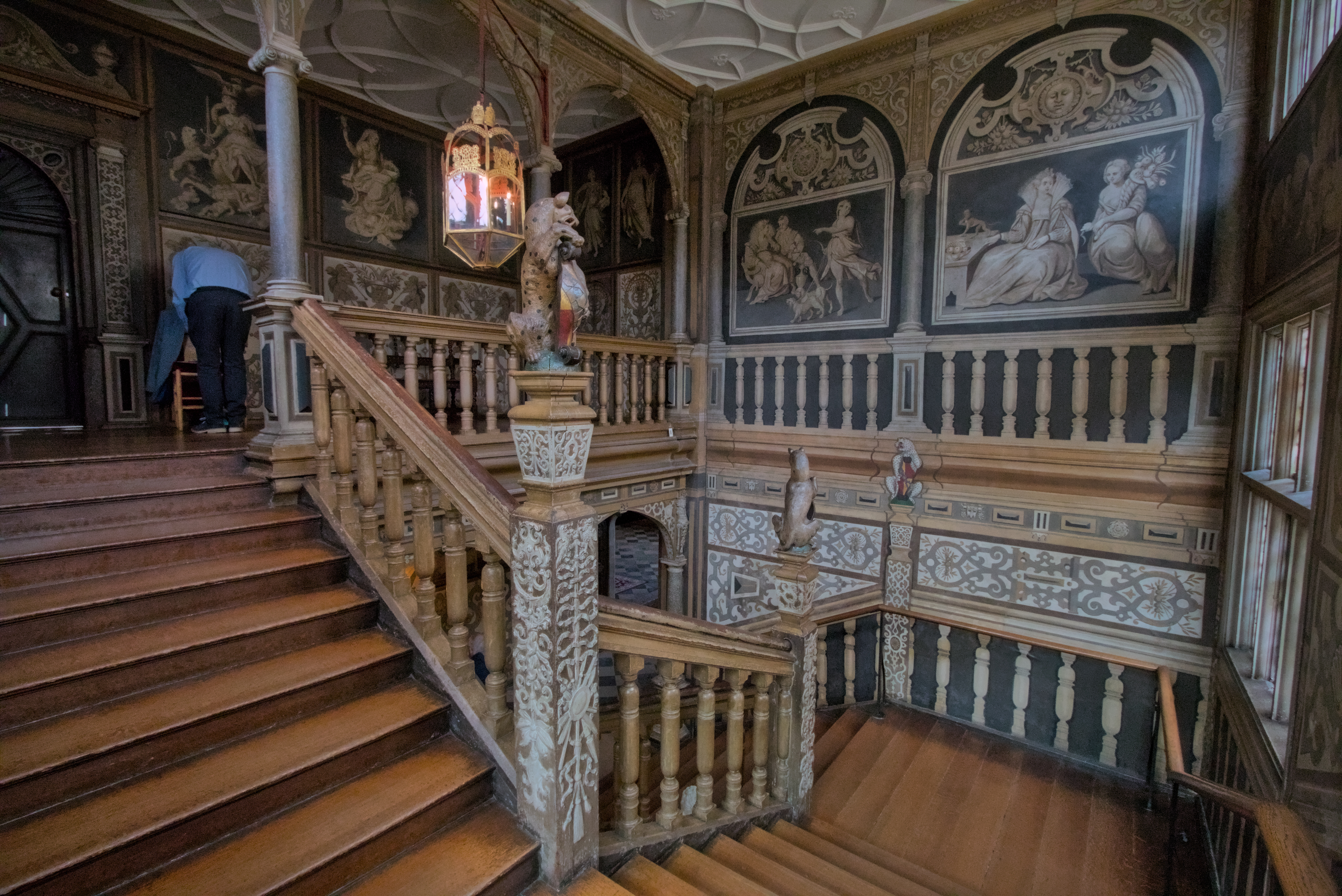
The Great Staircase at Knole

Although the term is generally employed of the style which prevailed in England during the first quarter of the 17th century, its peculiar decadent detail will be found nearly twenty years earlier at Wollaton Hall, Nottingham, and in Oxford and Cambridge examples exist up to 1660, notwithstanding the introduction of the purer Italian style by Inigo Jones in 1619 at Whitehall.

== In the Americas ==
In 1607 and 1620, England founded her first successful colonies: Jamestown, Virginia, and Plymouth, Massachusetts. As with other settlers in the New World, builders often followed the Jacobean vernacular architecture in the area of England from which they originated. Historians often classify this architecture as a subtype of colonial American architecture, called First Period architecture; Jacobean architecture lasted longer in America than England owing to less contact between the American colonists and the fashions of England.

When the Puritans arrived in the winter of 1620 in New England, there was very little time to waste owing to the bitterly cold weather and the fact that many of the occupants of the Mayflower were very ill and needed to get into housing before the diseases on board could spread further. Those that were still able bodied had to act quickly, building familiar timber-framed wattle and daub walls and thatching their roofs with grass from the local salt marshes. Most of these would have been hall and parlour dwellings with a simple central chimney (a feature of British architecture since the earlier Elizabethan era), a squat lower floor and an upper floor with bare beams and a space to be used for storage. Measurements of the archaeological remains of houses owned by Myles Standish and John Alden in Duxbury, Massachusetts, reveal that the original homes were very small, averaging approximately forty feet long by fifteen feet wide. This concurs with the dimensions of contemporary English yeoman farmhouses as evidenced by the surviving tax rolls of the Jacobean era.

Examples of original Jacobean architecture in the Americas include Drax Hall Great House and St. Nicholas Abbey, both located in Barbados, and Bacon's Castle in Surry County, Virginia.

== Revival ==
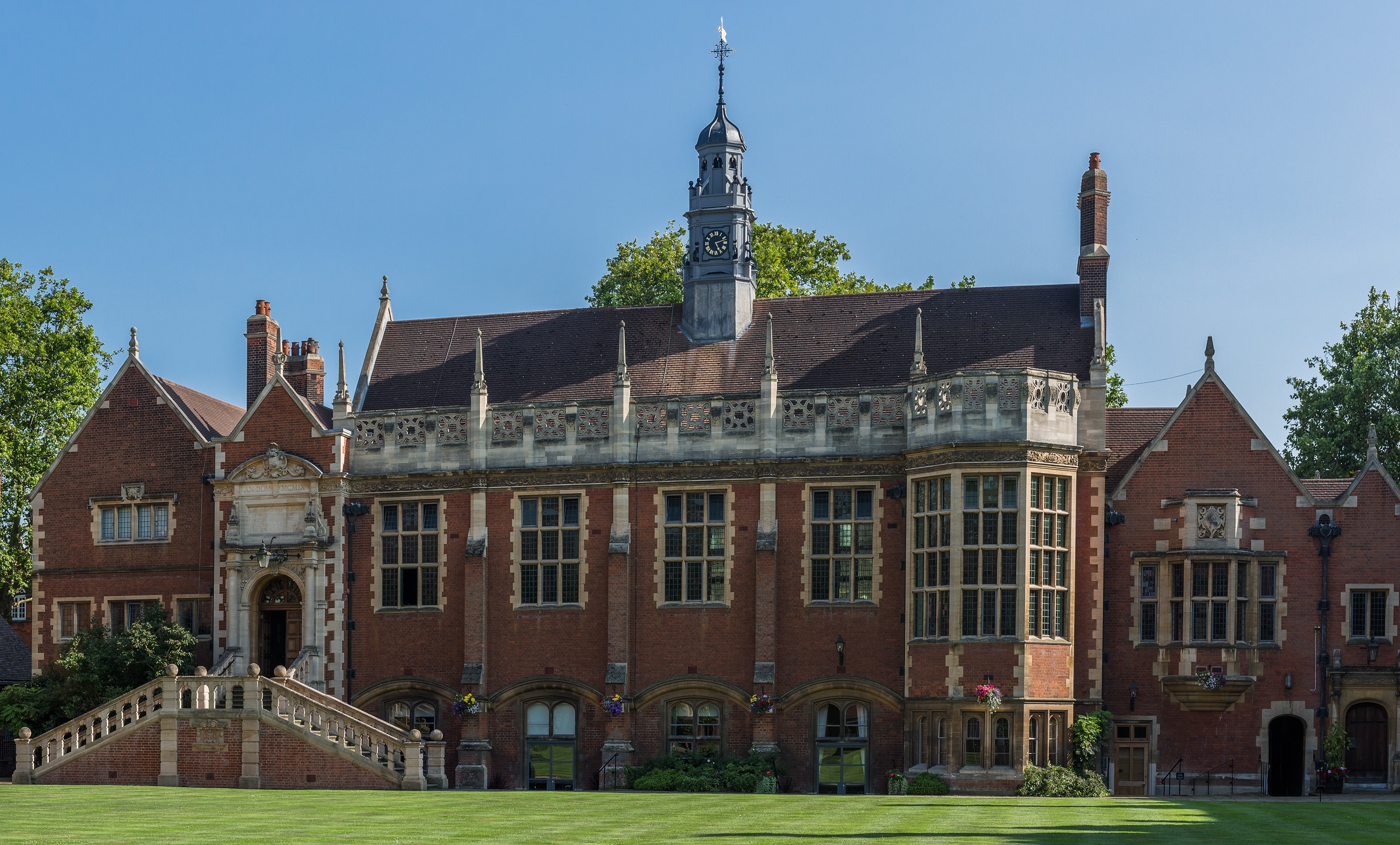
Jacobean Revival dining hall (Selwyn College, Cambridge)

In the 19th century, the neo-Jacobean or "Jacobethan" style was briefly popular in England and America. Examples include much of Hobart College in Geneva, NY, the University of Florida and Florida State University the latter two both designed by William Augustus Edwards. In England, the combination of brick and stone influenced the 'streaky bacon' style of architects like Richard Norman Shaw.

== See also ==
- Jacobean era
- Jacobean Revival
