= St Deiniols Ash =

Manor house in Flintshire, Wales

Coordinates: 53.18920°N 3.023593°W

St Deiniols Ash is a 16th- or 17th-century Grade-I-listed timber-framed manor house in Hawarden, in Flintshire, north-east Wales. The house contains a series of wall paintings depicting the life of St Deiniol that are considered among the best-preserved examples in Britain.

The house allegedly stands on the site where, in the 6th century AD, St Deiniol was shipwrecked in the Dee estuary. The present house was built by the prominent Aldersey family of Chester. Towards the close of the 17th century, the house passed into the possession of the Cratchley family.

== History ==
The Ash was allegedly founded in the early to mid-6th century AD by St Deiniol who, after being shipwrecked in the estuary of the river Dee, planted his ash staff on the site and began to preach the word of God. It is suggested that he also built the church of clay and wicker on the hilltop, but there is no evidence of a church on the current site until the 10th century, and W. Bell Jones suggests that the current church was not completed until the 13th century. St Deiniol would go on to found two cathedrals: Bangor Fawr (city of Bangor, Gwynedd) and Bangor Ys-Coed (village of Bangor-on-Dee, Wrexham). Several other churches throughout Wales, notably Hawarden in this case, bear his name or were allegedly founded by him as well. The house of St Deiniols Ash is first noted as being owned by the Aldersey family, who were a highly prominent force in the area, at least in the 16–17th centuries. For example, it is likely that the timber-framed core of the current house at the site was built by William Aldersey who died in 1577. By the late 17th century, the house belonged to the Cratchley family, who were likely responsible for various new additions to the house, such as the brick parlour wing and storeyed porch.

== Architecture ==
The house was built in two main periods, the original house, built in the 16th century, and the later 17th-century additions. The main house consists of a large timber-framed, brick building, decorated with close studding and a medium-pitch roof. The later additions include a tall parlour wing, a garderobe tower, and a porch. The interior of the house possesses a number of contemporary 16th-century paintings depicting the life of St Deiniol. These paintings were among the more significant elements of the house in terms of conservation, and were one of the reasons why it received Grade I listed status.
