= Pentrehobyn =

House in Flintshire, Wales

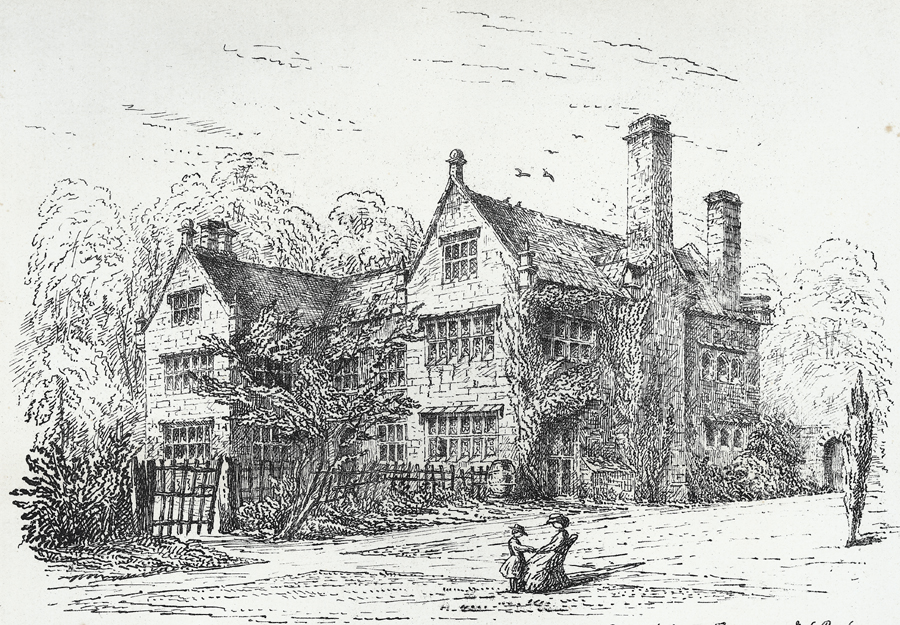
- A print of 1862 showing the entrance front

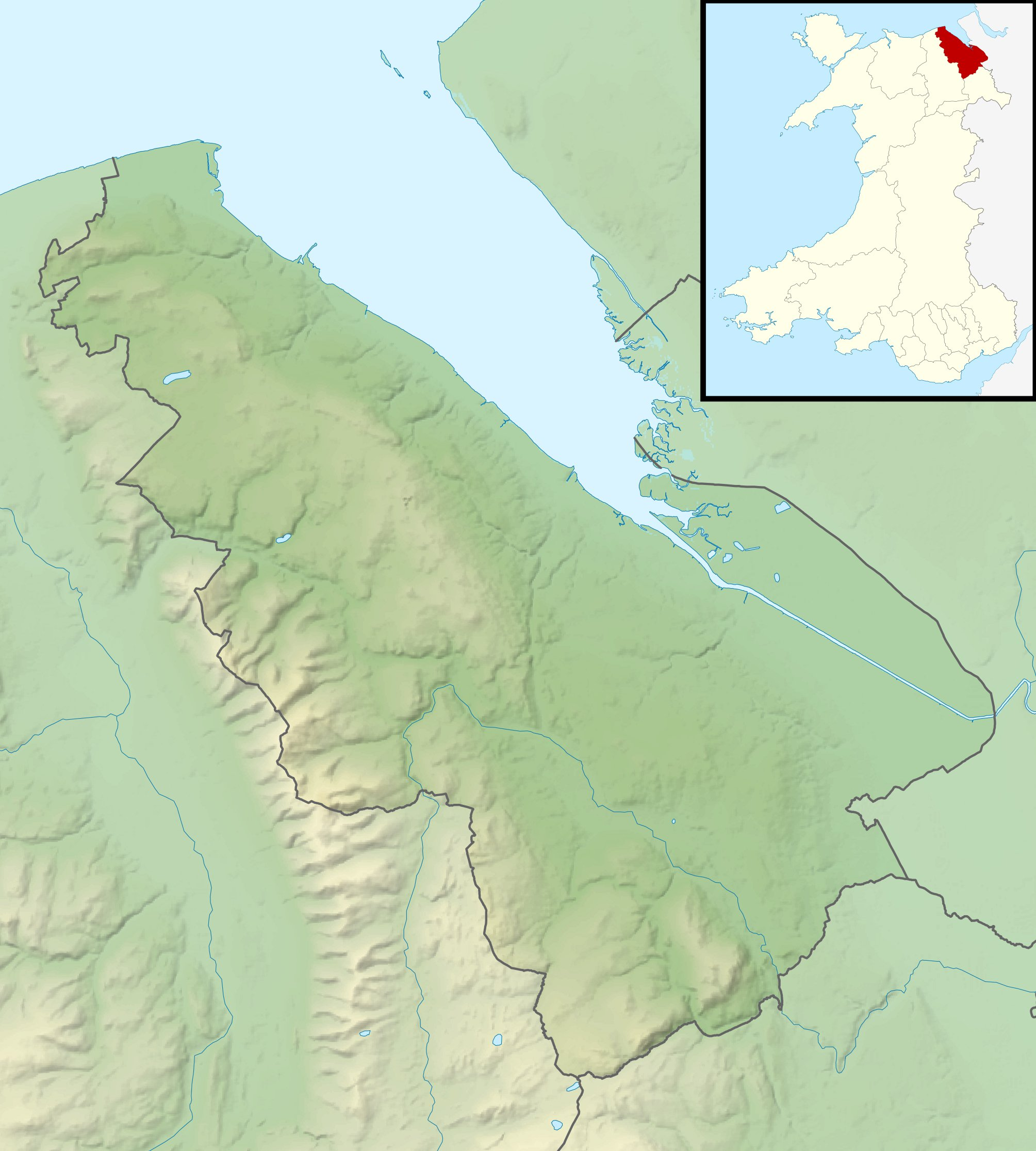
- Location within Flintshire
- 53.1537°N 3.1235°W
- Type: House
- Location: Padeswood, Flintshire, Wales

History
- Built: 15th and 16th centuries

Site notes
- Architectural style: Jacobethan
- Governing body: Privately owned

Listed Building – Grade I
- Official name: Pentrehobyn
- Designated: 22 October 1952
- Reference no.: 14882

Listed Building – Grade I
- Official name: Llettau at Pentrehobyn
- Designated: 22 October 1952
- Reference no.: 17657

Listed Building – Grade II
- Official name: Barn to northeast of Pentrehobyn
- Designated: 5 December 1997
- Reference no.: 19110

Listed Building – Grade II
- Official name: Inner Boundary Wall at Pentrehobyn including attached gate piers on main drive
- Designated: 5 December 1997
- Reference no.: 19109

Cadw/ICOMOS Register of Parks and Gardens of Special Historic Interest in Wales
- Official name: Pentrehobyn Gardens
- Designated: 1 February 2022
- Reference no.: PGW(C)22(FLT)

Pentrehobyn is a large house standing just to the south-east of Mold, Flintshire, Wales. The present hall dates mainly from the mid-17th century, although parts may be older, and it includes later additions. The estate was owned, and the hall built, by the Lloyd family, local landowners who served as agents to the Lords of Penryhn in the 19th century. The hall is designated by Cadw as a Grade I listed building. An attached llettau (lodgings) block has its own Grade I listing. The gardens and grounds are designated Grade II on the Cadw/ICOMOS Register of Parks and Gardens of Special Historic Interest in Wales.

== History ==
Cadw dates the original house at Pentrehobyn to the mid 16th century, citing stylistic details of the windows and datestones of 1540 and 1546 in support. It dates the present house to the early 17th century. The Royal Commission on the Ancient and Historical Monuments of Wales (RCAHMW) is less certain, believing the house to date entirely from the 17th century and later, with "details intended to suggest greater antiquity". Much of the uncertainty relates to the two datestones; the stone in the great hall carries the date "1546" and that over the entrance "1540". However, the fireplace in the hall in which the 1546 datestone is set clearly dates from the 17th century - it carries the coat of arms of James I, who ascended the English throne in 1603, and the costumes of the figures decorating the chimneypiece are Elizabethan, Elizabeth I having become queen in 1558. Edward Hubbard considered the seeming contradictions in his Clwyd volume in the Buildings of Wales series, and drew a clear conclusion; "the date 1546 [.] is not to be trusted. Neither is the inscription 1540 over the entrance".

Pentrehobyn was built by the Lloyd family, who owned land in the area and members of which served as land agents to the Lords of Penryhn in the 19th century. The hall was restored and extended in the 19th century, and again restored between 1969 and 1970. During this latter restoration, the original screens passage was revealed. The hall remains in the possession of the Lloyd family and operates as a wedding and events venue.

=== Llettau ===
The Llettau (lodgings) is a single-storey range that runs to the east of the hall. It comprises eight vaulted cells, the ones at the eastern end being larger than those at the end nearer the hall. The purpose of the structure is uncertain. The RCAHMW records suggestions as to its use which include kennels, stables, a hostel for pilgrims and a place of lodging for vagrants. Cadw considers that the size of the cells would have made them unsuitable for cattle or horses, and that their stone vaulting, an expensive roofing method, and the proximity of the llettau to the main house makes it unlikely that "even a benevolent landowner" would have wanted them to be inhabited by potentially troublesome vagrants. Hubbard suggests the provision of "accommodation for poor travellers" as the most likely purpose. (Note: Hubbard identifies further dating confusion in relation to the Llettau. While the detailing is "Jacobean in character, a doorway and window lights suggest earlier origin".)

== Architecture and description ==
Pentrehobyn is built to a H-plan, with a three-storey central block and two flanking wings. It is built of local stone and roofed in Welsh slate. (Note: The slate comes from Penrhyn quarry, owned by the Lords of Penryhn for whom members of the Lloyd family worked in the 19th century.) The interior plan of the house largely follows that of a medieval hall house, with an offset entrance porch leading into a great hall with a screens passage, and a great chamber above.

Pentrehobyn is a Grade I listed building. The Llettau has its own Grade I designation. A barn and a boundary wall are both listed at Grade II. The RCAHMW considers the barn to be contemporary with the 17th century house. The coach house and stables date from the 18th century. The gardens, mainly laid out in the late 19th century, are listed as Grade II in the Cadw/ICOMOS Register of Parks and Gardens of Special Historic Interest in Wales.

== Sources ==
- Hubbard, Edward (2003). Clwyd (Denbighshire and Flintshire). The Buildings of Wales. New Haven and London: Yale University Press. ISBN 978-0-300-09627-9. OCLC 315792534.
