= Fferm =

House in Flintshire, Wales

Coordinates: 53°08′06″N 3°04′44″W

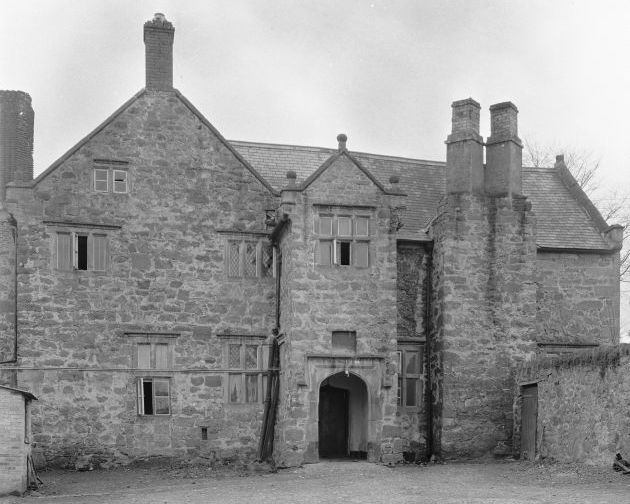
Fferm House, photographed in 1941

Fferm (Welsh for "farm") Farmhouse is a small Elizabethan manor house, located to the east of Pontblyddyn in the county of Flintshire, Wales. It is listed as a grade I historic building, as 'an exceptionally fine example of a small manorial house', particularly because it retains much of its original sub-medieval detail and layout. It was likely built during the late 16th century by John Lloyd, one of the Lloyds of nearby Hartsheath Hall, who is recorded as having inhabited the house in the period between 1575 and 1625. The exterior of the house follows the vernacular style of other such local buildings like Pentrehobyn Hall near Mold.

The house is now opened to the public on a regular basis.

== Ηistory ==
The house was built in the 16th century, possibly around 1575, by a John Lloyd, as a manorial seat for the Lloyd family of Hartsheath. The house would have been a seat of power and a symbol of wealth in the local area. The estate passed through marriage to the Puleston family at the end of the 17th century, and by the 18th century was leased out as a farmhouse.

The house is surrounded by a number of other listed buildings, including the contemporary 'Brewhouse' which is thought to have been home to the Steward of the Manor before being used as a storehouse in more recent times.

The house was fully restored in 1960 by Robert Heaton of Wrexham for the Jones-Mortimer family with the help of a government grant of £1500.

== Design ==
The farmhouse is built of stone rubble, probably once rendered with sandstone dressings to the windows and doors, with a slate roof.

The house retains its sub-medieval plan-form and much of its original detail. It has a particularly wide display of elaborately engraved architrave detailing. One of the doorways is differentiated from the servants' passage by the engraved wooden architrave, which emphasises that the right hand door is more polite. In the single storey hall, there also remains a Tudor-arched sandstone fireplace, with heavy moulded beams to the ceiling and iron meat hooks which date from when this room was used as a kitchen.

== Layout ==
It is thought that the 16th century manor house was originally built in a H plan, with a central hall and cross-passage to the left. Estate maps indicate that the parlour wing, which housed the original staircase, was demolished after 1766. There is evidence of work being carried out in the late 17th century, which is when the current staircase was installed. There is some difference in the dates that the secondary main stairway was built and when the parlour was demolished. It has been suggested that the parlour wing was damaged by Parliamentary forces during the Civil War, and that the staircase was built whilst the parlour was left as a ruined shell.

The house was originally fronted by an enclosed forecourt, and a heraldic cobbled path leads from the original stone gate to the porch. The central storeyed porch was added shortly after the house was originally constructed.

The gardens are listed as Grade II in the Cadw/ICOMOS Register of Parks and Gardens of Special Historic Interest in Wales.
