= Pontblyddyn =

Village in Flintshire, Wales

Coordinates: 53.136°N 3.083°W

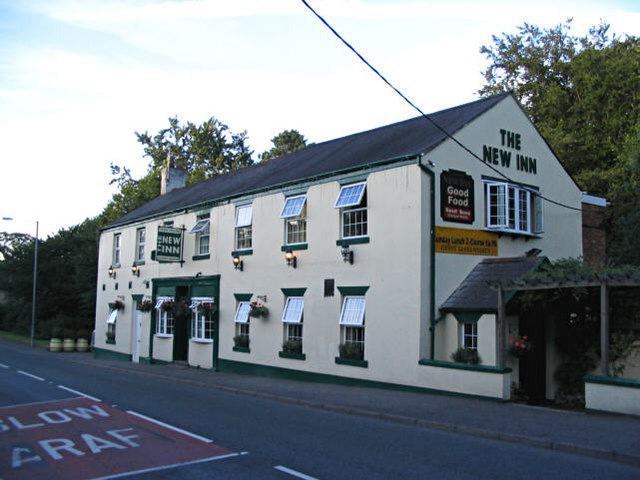
- The New Inn public house, Pontblyddyn, now a cafe

- Location within Flintshire
- OS grid reference: SJ275605
- Principal area: Flintshire
- Preserved county: Clwyd
- Country: Wales
- Sovereign state: United Kingdom
- Post town: MOLD
- Postcode district: CH7
- Dialling code: 01352
- Police: North Wales
- Fire: North Wales
- Ambulance: Welsh
- UK Parliament: Clwyd East
- Senedd Cymru – Welsh Parliament: Delyn

Pontblyddyn is a village just to the east of Leeswood, in Flintshire, Wales and is situated around 8 miles from Wrexham. Plas Teg, one of the most important Jacobean-era houses in Wales, is located near the village.

It is in the community of Leeswood and Pontblyddyn.
