= Nerquis Hall =

Gentry house in Nercwys, Flintshire, Wales

Coordinates: 53°07′55″N 3°08′11″W

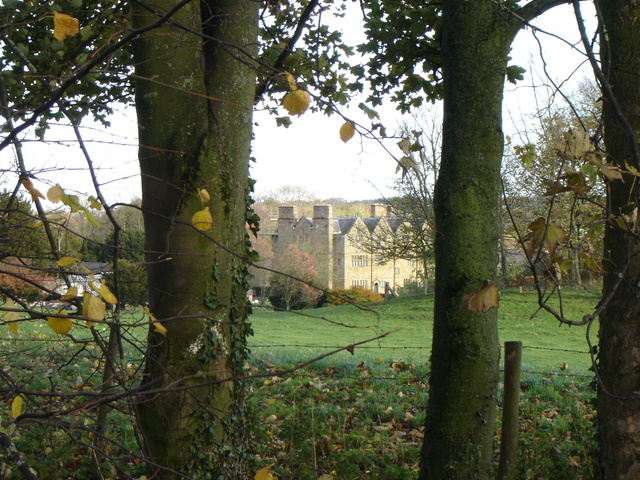
Nerquis Hall

Nerquis Hall (Welsh: Neuadd Nercwys) is a 17th-century gentry house located in the North Wales village of Nercwys, Flintshire. Completed in the mid-1600s, the hall has survived in good condition and is currently a private residence. Nerquis Hall was designated a Grade I listed building in October 1952.

== History ==
Nerquis Hall was constructed for John Wynne (of the Welsh Wynne family) in 1638, with the interior likely completed afterwards in 1640. Part of a larger estate, the hall is a two-storey brick and sandstone structure and is largely intact. Refurbishments to the property were notably undertaken in the late 18th century by John Giffard, who added an east and west wing to the property in 1797. However, these alterations were later demolished when the estate was sold in the 1960s, with only the ground floor of the east wing remaining untouched. Though not open to the public, the interior is noted as having a 19th-century Gothic style.

Owned by John Wynne, Nerquis Hall was passed down to his son Robert in 1643 and then through his family line until its sale in the 1960s. Documents from 1873, when the estate was owned by Phillips Lloyd Fletcher, estimate the size as 3,877 acres. Part of the properties wider significance is that some original documents from its 17th-century construction have survived, for example detailing the contracted work of carpenter Evan Jones. These records are now kept at the National Library of Wales.

== Other estate buildings ==
Nerquis Hall is located within a larger estate and 18th-century formal ornamental gardens. Many other structures within the estate are Grade II listed buildings, including but not limited to:

- A late-18th-century folly, 0.5 km north-east of the hall.
- A 1813 brick and glass orangery, west of the hall.
- An 18th-century adjoining garden wall, north-east of the hall.
- The remaining ground floor of the east wing, built in 1797.
- The 18th-century stable range, north-east of the hall.
- The 18th-century decorative iron lower gates and forecourt wall, north-west of the hall.

The parks and gardens are listed as Grade II in the Cadw/ICOMOS Register of Parks and Gardens of Special Historic Interest in Wales.
