= Rhual =

Grade I listed building in the United Kingdom

Coordinates: 53.1750°N 3.1672°W

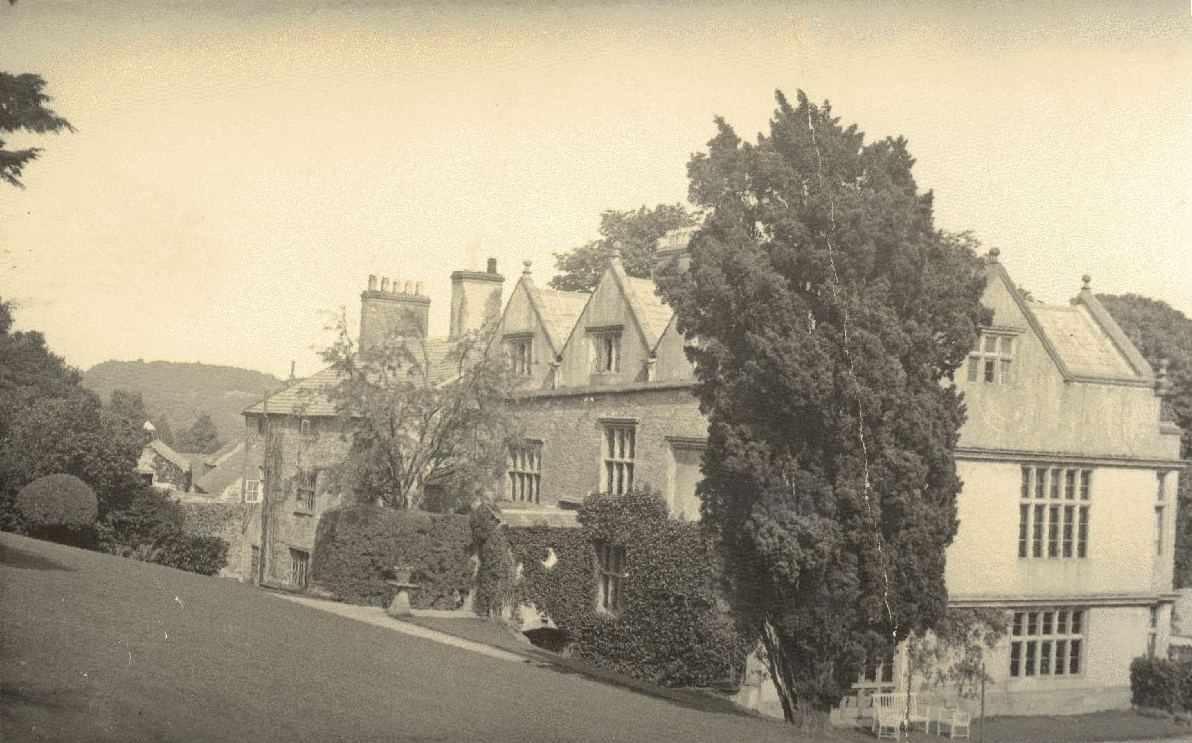
A view of Rhual from the rear, from a 1931 postcard

Rhual is a Grade I listed building in Flintshire, Wales. This small mansion has medieval origins and is surrounded by a large landscaped park. The present building was constructed in 1634 by Evan Edwards, a member of a well established Flintshire family which traced its descent from the Welsh king Hywel Dda. He most likely incorporated an older medieval house into the north wing of the current building. The house has since been built upon further, and the east and south entrances were created in the 19th century.

It is designated a Grade I listed building as "a very good example of a Jacobean house", particularly due to its retention of the original staircase. It is also notable for its double-pile form, which still retains its notional cross passage.

The parks and gardens are listed as Grade II* in the Cadw/ICOMOS Register of Parks and Gardens of Special Historic Interest in Wales.

== History ==
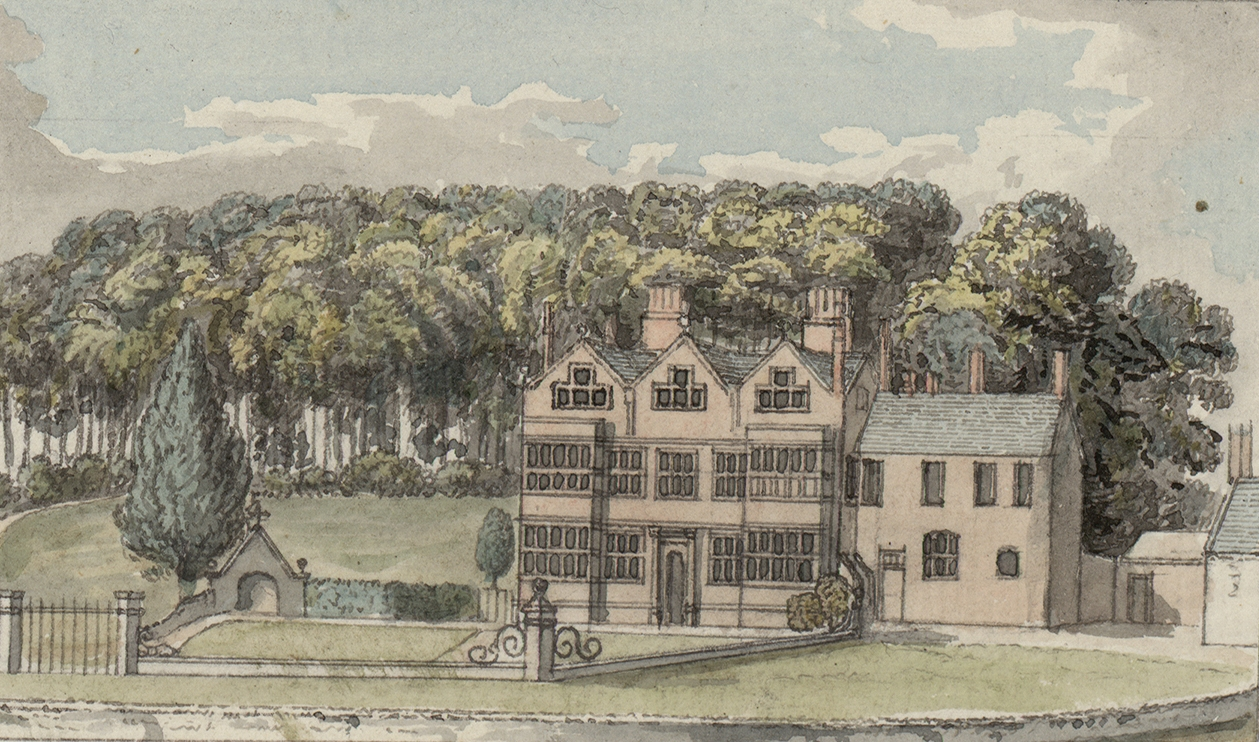
A watercolour of Rhual from a 1781 tour of Wales

Evan Edwards, who built the present house, was secretary to Richard Sackville, 3rd Earl of Dorset. His family's association with the Sackvilles saw an improvement in the family fortunes, making it possible for Edwards to invest in his new house. Upon Edwards's death, the house initially passed on to his grandson, Thomas, then onto Thomas's sister, Mary, wife of the prominent Nonconformist Walter Griffith, whose eldest son Nehemiah Griffith (1691–1738) then inherited the estate. However, he died unmarried, therefore leaving the house to his brother, Thomas, who in turn died in 1740, leaving it to his infant son, also named Thomas. In 1764 this Thomas Griffith married Henrietta Marie Clarke, sister of Field Marshal Sir Alured Clarke. By 1815 there were no male heirs and the estate was sold.

In 1832 the house was repurchased for descendants of the Griffith family by the aforementioned Sir Alured Clarke, who was now a prominent military figure, before being gifted to his eldest niece, Henrietta Maria Phillips. The house then remained in the family until 1915, when Lt. Col. Basil Edwin Philips, the last male heir, was killed at Gallipoli. His daughter, Margaret Gwenllian Philips, married Commander Hugh Edward Heaton, and the estate now remains in the hands of their son.

Extensive estate archives are kept at Flintshire Record Office.

== Design ==
The house is in very good condition, particularly as it retains much of its original character. This is particularly noticeable in the exterior where there are five symmetrical design bays, two bays and an array of mullion-and-transom windows. There is also a central arched doorway set between two fluted Doric columns.

In the interior, there is a double-pile plan form to the 1643 section. The library features a black marble Regency fireplace with built-in Gillow Gothic Revival–style bookshelves to either side.
