= Henblas, Anglesey =

Area of Llangristiolus, Anglesey, Wales

Coordinates: 53.22633°N 4.363997°W

Henblas
- Location within Anglesey
- OS grid reference: SH 4229 7253
  - Cardiff: 130.7 mi (210.3 km)
  - London: 214.6 mi (345.4 km)
- Community: Llangristiolus
- Principal area: Anglesey
- Country: Wales
- Sovereign state: United Kingdom
- Post town: Bodorgan
- Police: North Wales
- Fire: North Wales
- Ambulance: Welsh
- UK Parliament: Ynys Môn
- Senedd Cymru – Welsh Parliament: Ynys Môn

Henblas is a hamlet in community of Llangristiolus, Anglesey, Wales, which is 130.7 miles (210.3 km) from Cardiff and 214.6 miles (345.3 km) from London.

== See also ==
- List of localities in Wales by population
