= Leeswood =

Village and community in Flintshire, Wales

Coordinates: 53.133°N 3.095°W

Leeswood: Welsh: Coed-llai
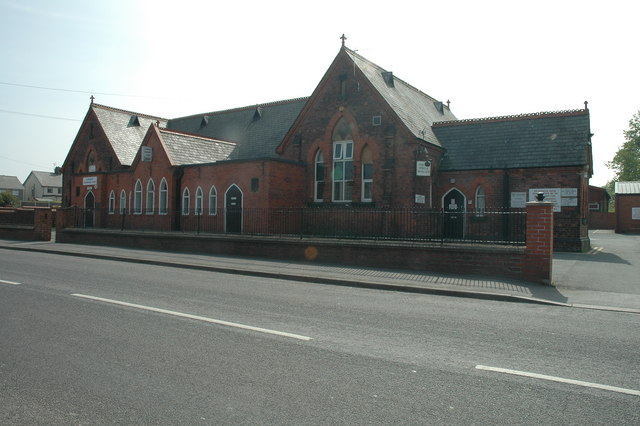
- Leeswood Community Centre

- Location within Flintshire
- Population: 2,135 (2011 Census)
- OS grid reference: SJ267601
- Community: Leeswood and Pontblyddyn
- Principal area: Flintshire
- Preserved county: Clwyd
- Country: Wales
- Sovereign state: United Kingdom
- Post town: MOLD
- Postcode district: CH7
- Dialling code: 01352
- Police: North Wales
- Fire: North Wales
- Ambulance: Welsh
- UK Parliament: Clwyd East
- Senedd Cymru – Welsh Parliament: Delyn

Leeswood (Welsh: Coed-llai) is a village, community and electoral ward in Flintshire, Wales, about 3 miles (5 km) from the market town of Mold. At the 2001 census, the population was 2,143, reducing slightly to 2,135 at the 2011 census.

It was the centre of attention during the Mold Riot of 1869, where the owners of a local coal mine refused to allow the speaking of the Welsh language in the mines.

Around a quarter of Leeswood's resident population has some knowledge of the Welsh language, exceeding the county's average of 21.4%. In all categories of linguistic competency, the ward performs around the Flintshire average, although the proportion of those able only to understand spoken Welsh is higher than the county and national average.

The listed White Gates of Leeswood Hall were attributed to the Davies brothers of Wrexham. The family of smiths were known in the 18th century for their high-quality work using wrought-iron.

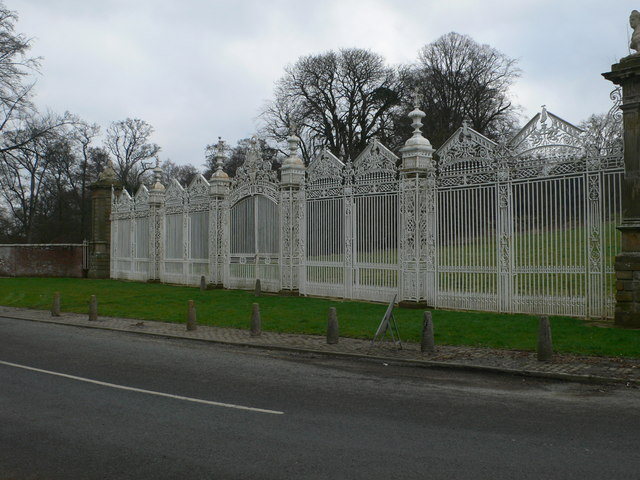
The "White Gates" at Leeswood Hall, attributed to Robert and John Davies

The Wynne baronets were later to live in Leeswood Hall around the middle of the 18th century. The family history of the baronets can be traced to the lineage of Welsh kings and princes, as well as Owain Glyndŵr.
