= Plas Teg =

Country house in Flintshire, Wales

Coordinates: 53°07′47″N 3°04′02″W

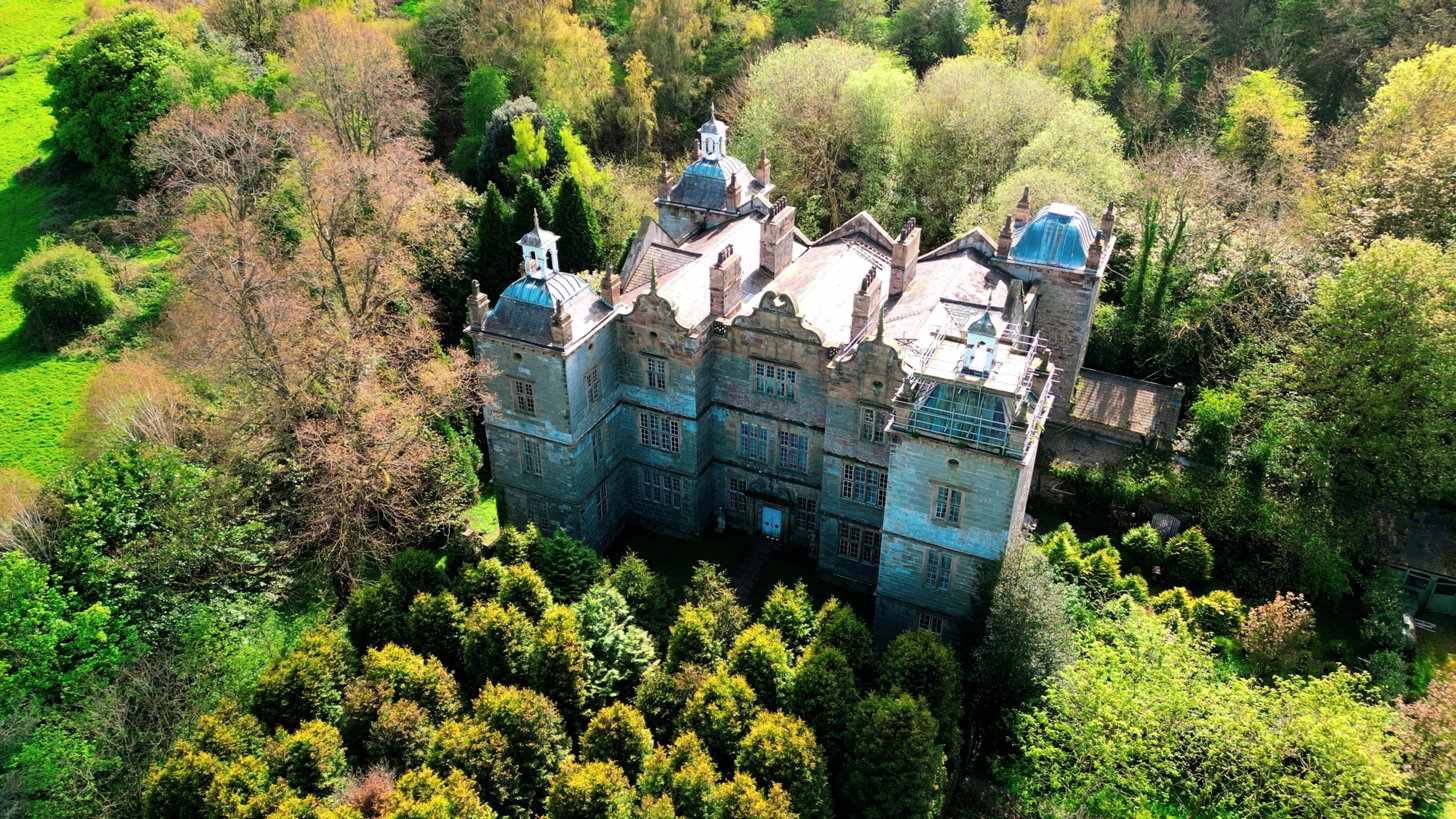
- Plas Teg in 2024

General information
- Type: Country house
- Architectural style: Jacobean
- Location: Pontblyddyn, in Flintshire, Wales
- Completed: c.1610
- Client: Sir John Trevor I

Listed Building – Grade I
- Official name: Plas Teg
- Designated: 14 February 1952; 74 years ago

Plas Teg is a Grade I listed Jacobean house in Wales. It is near the village of Pontblyddyn in Flintshire, between Wrexham and Mold. It is considered to be one of the finest examples of Jacobean architecture in Wales, and the finest in North Wales.

== History ==
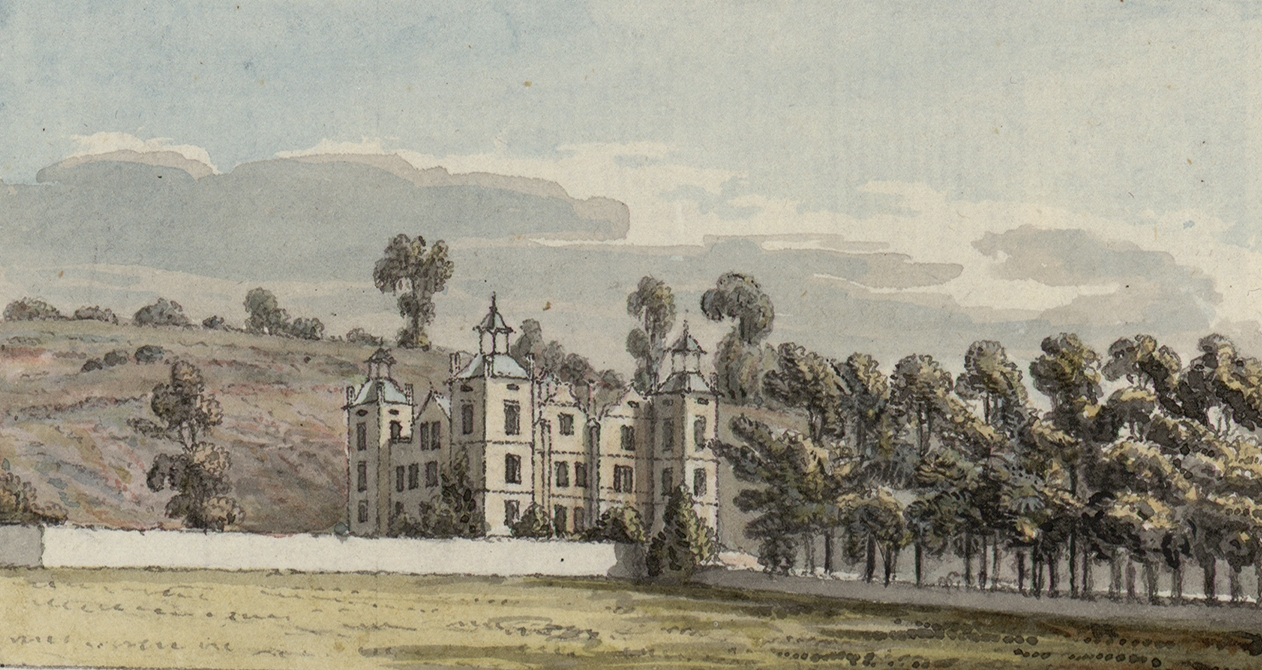
Plas Teg circa 1778

The house was built by Sir John Trevor I, a prominent courtier of King James I, in about 1610. Sir John died in 1630 and his wife in 1643, leaving the house unoccupied as the English Civil War broke out. It was twice raided by the Roundheads, but continued to be passed down to Trevor descendants until the early 20th century. During the Second World War the house was requisitioned by the War Office to billet soldiers. In 1945, it was sold to an auctioneers company, which used it for storage.

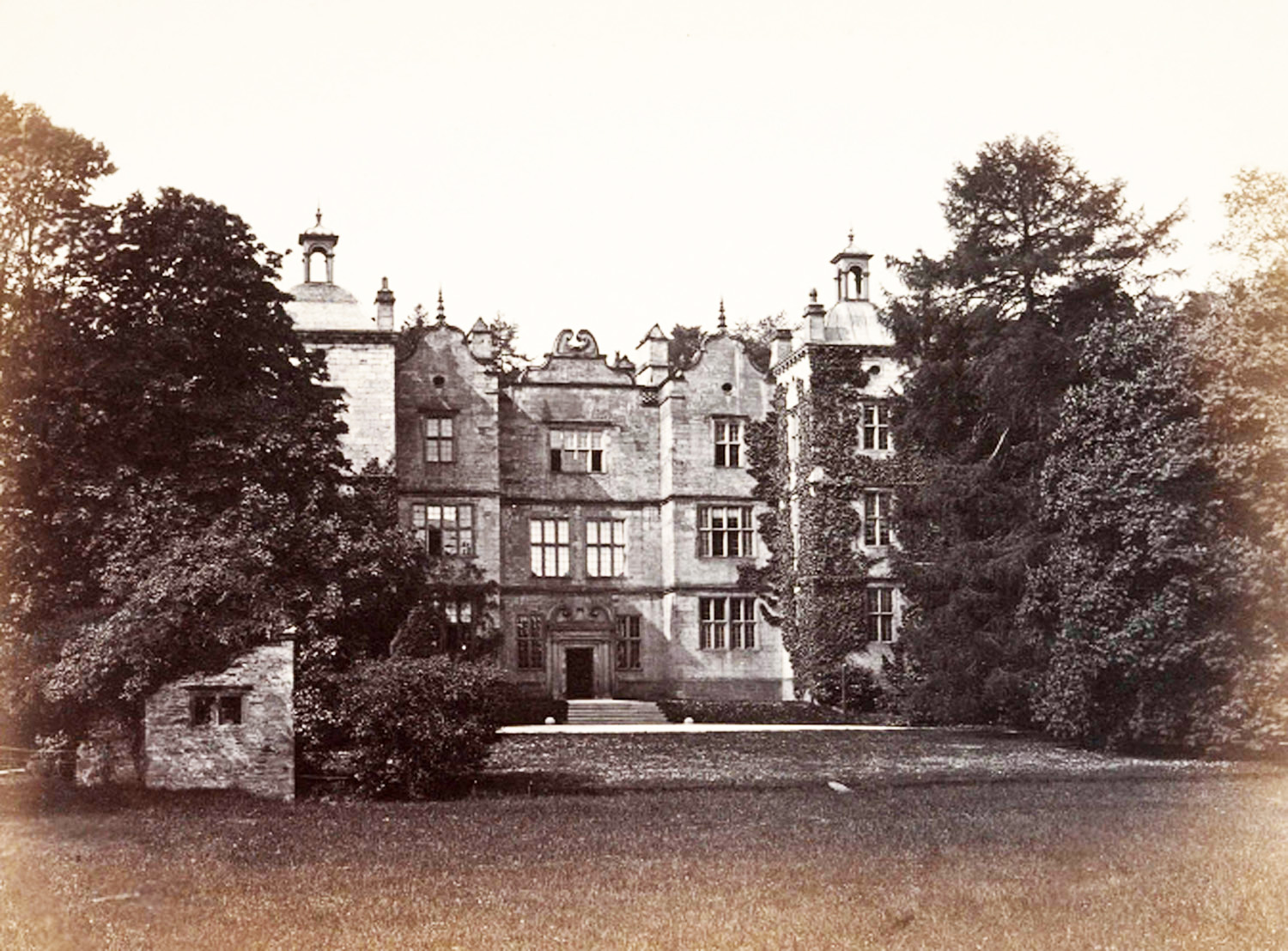
Plas Teg circa 1860 when it was owned by Colonel Trevor-Roper

By the early 1950s, Plas Teg was in a state of advanced decay and under threat of demolition. Following a public outcry, the derelict house received a Grade I listing from Cadw, protecting it from demolition. A Trevor descendant, Patrick Trevor-Roper, purchased the house and partially restored it with funds from the Historic Buildings Council. He then leased out the house until 1977, when Mr and Mrs William Llewelyn bought the house. The couple only used parts of the ground floor but the rest of the house became little more than a ruin.

=== Current ownership ===
In 1986 Cornelia Bayley acquired Plas Teg for £75,000. She carried out a series of works at a cost of £400,000, £199,000 of which was funded by Cadw. Ten months after purchase the house was opened to the public. It remains Bayley's private residence. Plas Teg in 2022 closed to the public pending repairs. In 2025, the contents of Plas Teg were auctioned. In an article by The Leader of the same year, it was confirmed by Mark Baker, the Plas Teg Trust, that "[Bayley] has willed the house to National Trust - who have covenants of the building - and the Landmark Trust". The same article states that the roof needs repairs and that the building is affected by dry rot.

The county of Flintshire is said to be a land of spirits and hauntings. One notable case is that of the grey lady, described as the most popular of such entities in North East Wales. The old woman is reported to have been seen moving across the A541 adjacent to Plas Teg into the path of traffic.

The courtyard entrance, walled garden, shrubberies and avenue are listed as Grade II in the Cadw/ICOMOS Register of Parks and Gardens of Special Historic Interest in Wales.

== In media ==
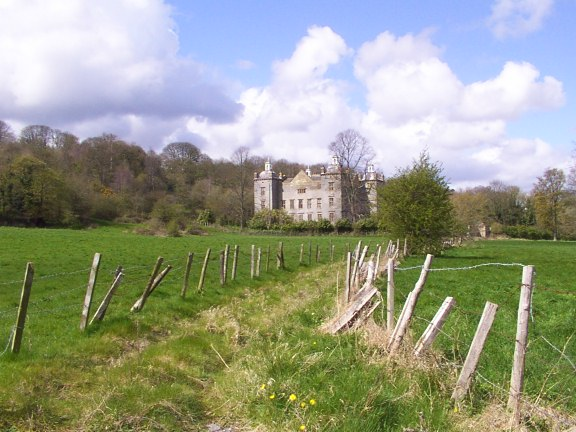
Plas Teg in 2005

Ghosthunting With... Girls Aloud was filmed at Plas Teg in 2006. In 2010 Plas Teg featured on Country House Rescue, in 2015 in Obsessive Compulsive Cleaners, and in 2019 Hidden Wales with Will Millard.

Musician Adam Perkins released multiple albums under the name Plas Teg.
