= Golden Grove, Flintshire =

Grade I listed building in Flintshire, Wales

Golden Grove
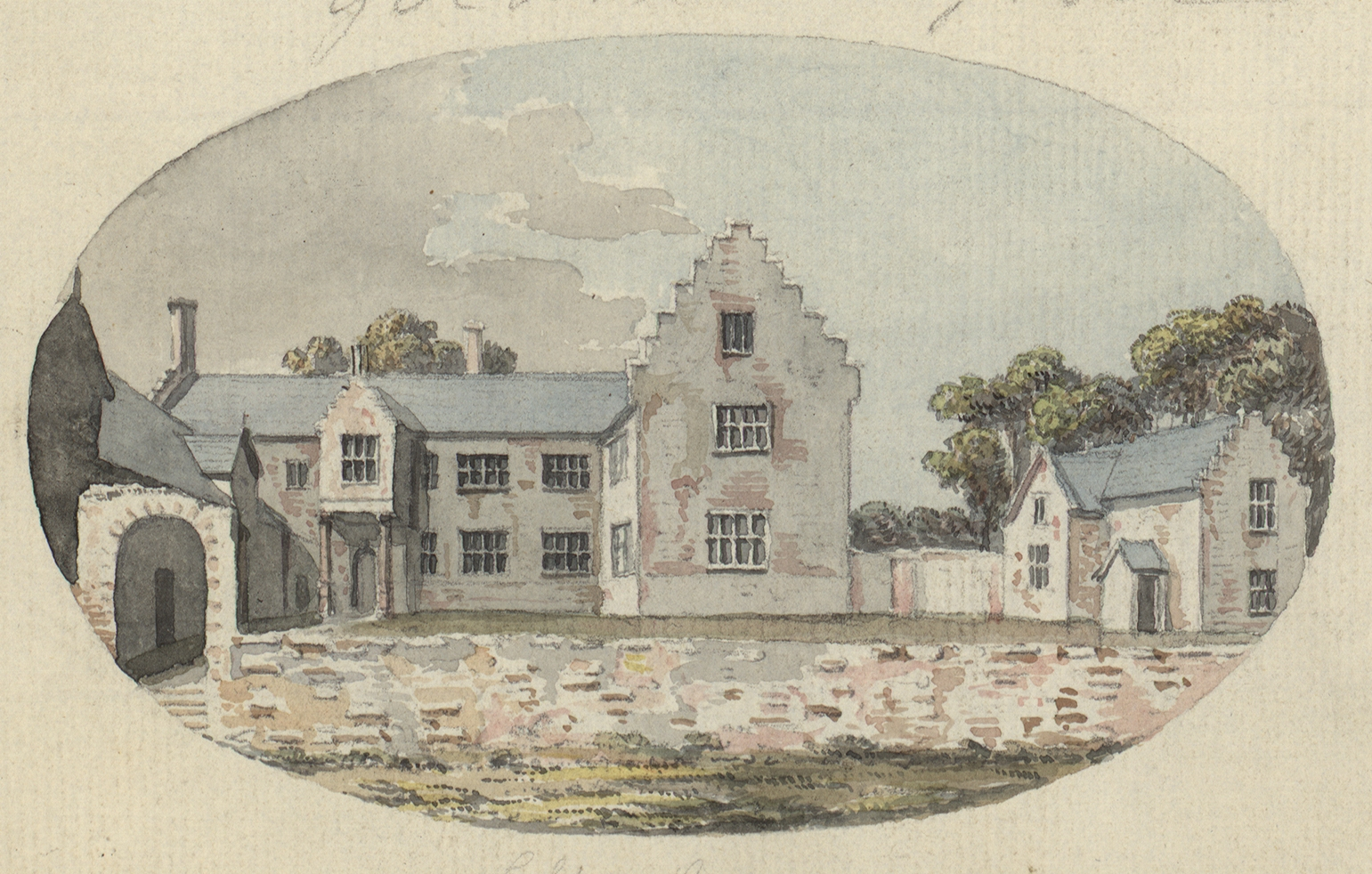
- A print of 1781 showing the entrance front

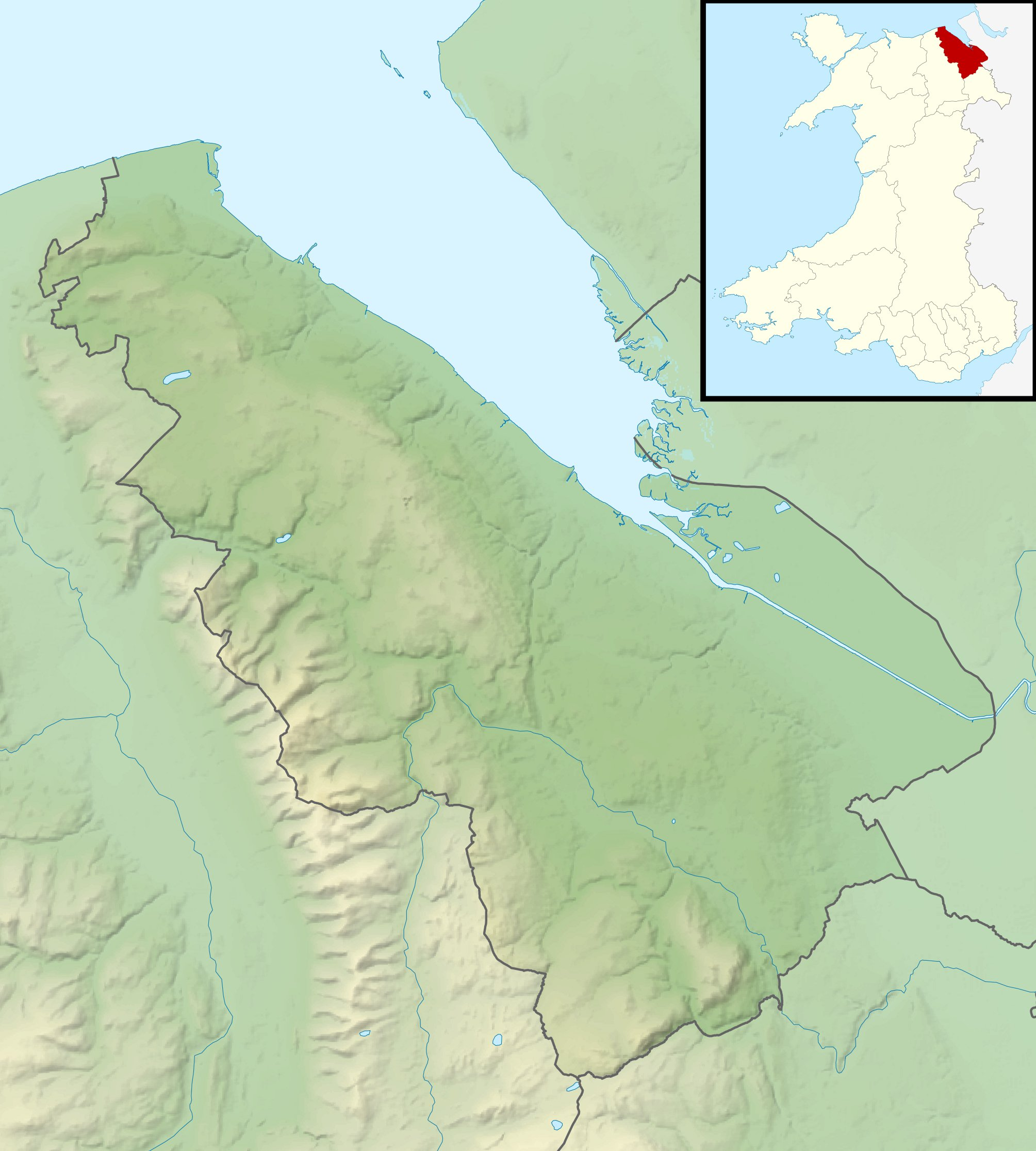
- Location within Flintshire
- 53.3227°N 3.3691°W
- Type: House
- Location: Llanasa, Flintshire, Wales

History
- Built: 1578

Site notes
- Architectural style: Elizabethan
- Governing body: Privately owned

Listed Building – Grade I
- Official name: Golden Grove
- Designated: 6 November 1962
- Reference no.: 301

Listed Building – Grade II
- Official name: Sundial at Golden Grove
- Designated: 6 November 1962
- Reference no.: 302

Listed Building – Grade II
- Official name: Greenhouse in terraced garden at Golden Grove
- Designated: 30 April 2001
- Reference no.: 25132

Cadw/ICOMOS Register of Parks and Gardens of Special Historic Interest in Wales
- Official name: Golden Grove Gardens
- Designated: 1 February 2022
- Reference no.: PGW(C)31(FLT)

Golden Grove (Welsh: Gwylgre) is an Elizabethan house to the west of the village of Llanasa, Flintshire, Wales. The mansion dates from 1578 and was built by Sir Edward Morgan, an official at the court of Elizabeth I. In the 19th century the estate was bought by Henry Pochin, owner of Bodnant Hall in neighboring Conwy, whose daughter, Laura, laid out the grounds at Golden Grove. The house is designated by Cadw as a Grade I listed building and the gardens and grounds are designated Grade II on the Cadw/ICOMOS Register of Parks and Gardens of Special Historic Interest in Wales.

== History ==
Cadw notes the datestone above the main entrance to Golden Grove which gives a construction date of 1578. (Note: The Royal Commission on the Ancient and Historical Monuments of Wales (RCAHMW) Coflein database gives a date of 1587. Edward Hubbard follows Cadw but notes another date on an internal chimneypiece of 1604, which he considers as probable a completion date as 1578.) The house was built by Sir Edward Morgan, an official at the Elizabethan court.

In the mid 19th century the Golden Grove estate was bought by Henry Pochin, a chemist and businessman who owned Bodnant Hall in neighboring Conwy. Porchin's daughter, Laura McLaren, Baroness Aberconway was a noted gardener, who worked with her husband to lay out the gardens at Bodnant and also did much work at Golden Grove. The house was sold again in the 20th century. It remains privately owned and operated as a hotel in the 21st century.

== Architecture and description ==
The house is of two storeys with a central two-storey entrance porch. Edward Hubbard in his Clwyd volume in the Buildings of Wales series, notes the decoration of the porch, which has a small upper chamber supported by a pair of columns below it. Golden Grove was originally built to a traditional h-plan, with a central block and two cross wings. The western wing no longer exists but both Cadw and Hubbard are certain that it once did and was later taken down. The gabled eastern wing has a third attic storey.

The gardens, mainly laid out in the late 19th and early 20th centuries but including a 17th-century walled garden, are listed as Grade II in the Cadw/ICOMOS Register of Parks and Gardens of Special Historic Interest in Wales. Laura McLaren's principal contribution was the laying out of a series of terraces planted with yew topiary which lead from the house down to the walled garden.

Golden Grove is a Grade I listed building. Other listed structures on the wider estate, all listed at Grade II, include a rare Elizabethan sundial dating from 1590; an early-20th century greenhouse; two sets of steps in the gardens; and a lodge at the entrance to the estate's drive.

== Sources ==
- Hubbard, Edward (2003). Clwyd (Denbighshire and Flintshire). The Buildings of Wales. New Haven and London: Yale University Press. ISBN 978-0-300-09627-9. OCLC 315792534.
