= Nercwys =

Village and community in Flintshire, Wales

- Village and community
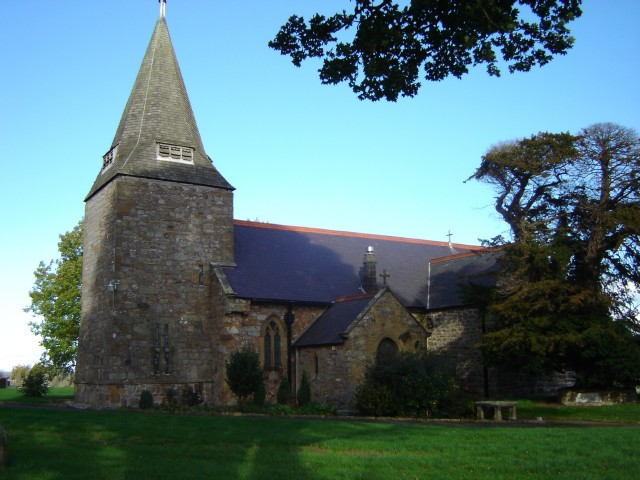
- St Mary's Church, Nercwys

- Location within Flintshire
- Population: 585 (2011)
- OS grid reference: SJ232606
- Principal area: Flintshire
- Preserved county: Clwyd
- Country: Wales
- Sovereign state: United Kingdom
- Post town: MOLD
- Postcode district: CH7
- Dialling code: 01352
- Police: North Wales
- Fire: North Wales
- Ambulance: Welsh
- UK Parliament: Clwyd East
- Senedd Cymru – Welsh Parliament: Delyn
- Website: Village website
- List of places UK Wales Flintshire 53.137°N 3.148°W Map of the community

Nercwys is a rural village and community in Flintshire, Wales, which is surrounded by open countryside. The community population taken at the 2011 census was 585. The older, anglicised spelling of Nerquis can sometimes be found. It has a small school and a local bus service to Mold which is around 3 miles to the north.

== Geography ==
Nercwys lies on the eastern fringe of the Clwydian Range and is served by a network of lanes. The modern settlement straggles along a shelf that interrupts the prevailing south-west to north-east slope. The River Terrig, a tributary of the Alyn, runs northwards less than one kilometre to the east.

Nercwys Forest, a large conifer woodland planted in 1965, lies to the west of the village. Multiple circular trails exist for mountain biking, hiking and horse riding, along with remnants of a Bronze Age cairn and industrial lead mining.

== History ==
The origins of this settlement are obscure. The shape of the churchyard might indicate an early medieval origin but there is no convincing evidence to corroborate the theory. The meaning of the name is obscure but could combine either "hanner" [half] or "anner" [heifer] with "cwys" [furrow]. The development of Nercwys through the Middle Ages and even into the post-medieval era remains to be elucidated. The first depiction on an estate map of 1734 shows Plas-yn-llan to the south of the churchyard, the White Lion Inn at the crossroads and a small number of dwellings scattered along the road.

The parish church is dedicated to St Mary, dates back to the 12th century and is a grade II* listed building. The church, an ancient chapelry of Mold, is first documented in 1291, when the place was termed Nerchgwys.

=== The Tower ===
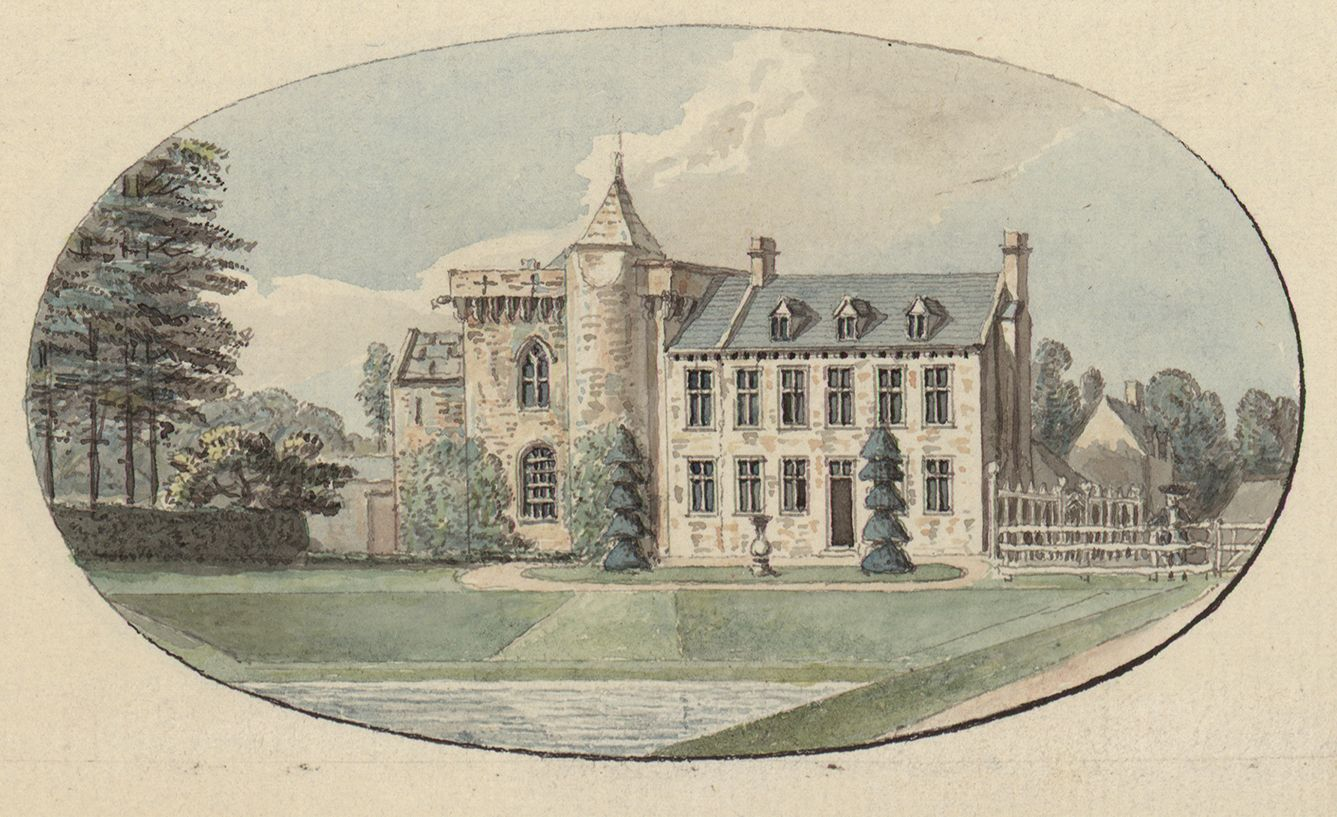
Tower. The only fortified border house still standing in Wales

Within the community of Nercwys is a Grade I listed Welsh fortified border house which is referred to as The Tower or simply 'Tower'. It is the only Welsh fortified border house still standing and has been in the same family for six centuries and is still privately owned. Over the decades the building has had many additions, including a tower and battlements which Mr Wynne-Eyton (the current occupier) thinks date from the 18th century and belongs to the early Gothic Revival period. This now gentrified home was referred to by the 15th-century poet Hywel Cilcan as “the fair Tower ….a fortress twenty fathoms high”. Rheinallt ap Gryfydd ap Bleddyn, who features in the continuous border warfare of the time, hung the Mayor of Chester in the dining hall at Tower in 1465. An iron staple in the ceiling of the medieval dining hall marks the spot. The family motto “Heb dduw, heb ddim”, which translates as “without God there is nothing”, is carved over the fireplace and stained glass windows in the building display the family coat of arms.

Other notable Grade I listed buildings in the area include Nerquis Hall, a 17th-century gentry house, surviving in good condition.
