= Llanasa =

Village and community in Flintshire, Wales

- Village and community
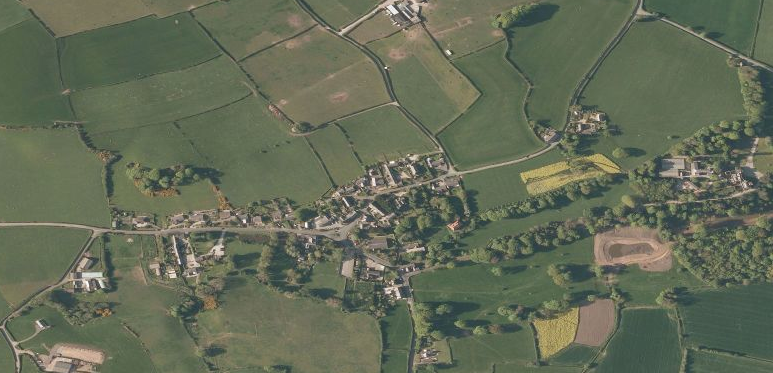
- Llanasa from above

- Location within Flintshire
- Population: 4,353 (2011)
- OS grid reference: SJ1064981425
- Principal area: Flintshire
- Country: Wales
- Sovereign state: United Kingdom
- Post town: HOLYWELL
- Postcode district: CH8
- Post town: PRESTATYN
- Postcode district: LL19
- Dialling code: 01745
- Police: North Wales
- Fire: North Wales
- Ambulance: Welsh
- UK Parliament: Clwyd East
- Senedd Cymru – Welsh Parliament: Delyn
- Website: Council website
- List of places UK Wales Flintshire 53.322°N 3.344°W Map of the community

Llanasa is a village and community in Flintshire, north-east Wales. Llanasa is described as one of the ancient parishes of Flintshire. It originally comprised the townships of Gronant, Gwespyr, Kelston, Golden Grove, Picton, Trewaelod, Axtyn and Trelogan. The modern community also includes Ffynnongroyw and Glan yr afon.

== History ==
Named after Saint Asaph the village is known to have existed since at least c.600 AD and was originally called Llanasaph meaning the Church of Saint Asaph. It was where the tomb and relics of Saint Asaph were enshrined before they were moved to the larger St Asaph Cathedral sometime before 1281. This ancient parish church was later the burial place of Gruffudd Fychan (the father of Owain Glyndŵr). The stone slab which covered his tomb survives and is engraved with the words HIC LACET GRVFVD VACHAN or "here lies Gruffudd Fychan". This slab, according to records, was originally in the centre of the south aisle and it would appear that Gruffudd Fychan was buried in this church sometime between 1350 and 1370. His remains have not been found.

Welsh relatives of Glyndŵr, known as the Hughes of Gwerclas family, continued to live in the area during the 18th and 19th centuries.

Elis Gruffydd, the 'Soldier of Calais', was born at Gronant Uchaf in this parish. He travelled to Calais first with Sir Robert Wingfield in 1520. Returning after a spell in London, he completed in around 1522 his massive world history, 'Cronicl Oes y Byd', telling of the Six Ages, and specifically the histories of Wales and England. The work is now contained in two manuscripts at the National Library of Wales.

=== Golden Grove ===
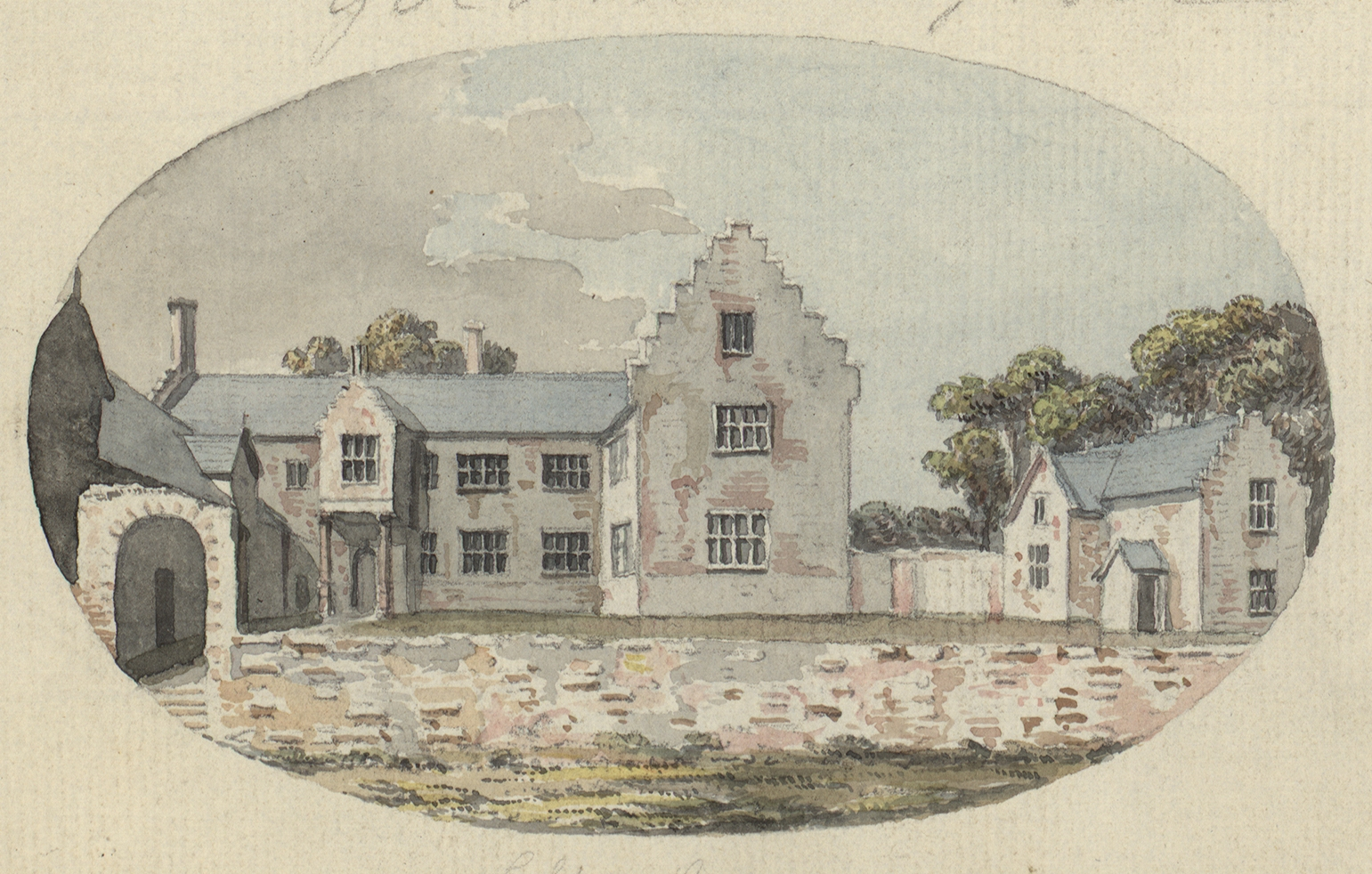
Golden Grove, c.1778

Golden Grove (Welsh: Gwylgre) is a Grade I listed 16th century Elizabethan manor house in a 1,000 acres estate to the west of the village. It was built c. 1580 by Sir Edward Morgan and renovated during the reign of Queen Anne. It was passed down in the Morgan family, several of whom were Sheriffs of Flintshire, until 1877, when it was sold to industrial chemist Henry Davis Pochin, who had already bought Bodnant. The late 19th century terraced garden with yew topiary, was designed by Henry Pochin's daughter Laura, wife of Charles McLaren, 1st Baron Aberconway, and leads from the house to the remains of a 17th-century walled garden. The house is now a luxury bed and breakfast hotel.
