= List of standardised Welsh place-names in Flintshire =

Location of Flintshire in Wales.

The list of standardised Welsh place-names, for places in Flintshire, is a list compiled by the Welsh Language Commissioner to recommend the standardisation of the spelling of Welsh place-names, particularly in the Welsh language and when multiple forms are used, although some place-names in English were also recommended to be matched with the Welsh. The list contains 118 entries, as of November 2023.

The list is based on recommendations provided by the Place-names Standardisation Panel, convened by the Commissioner, for expert advice on the standardisation of Welsh place-names. The panel bases their decisions on a set of guidelines (currently dating to June 2023), specific to Welsh settlement names (such as those of villages, towns, and cities) and topographic features (such as lakes, mountains and rivers). The panel does not cover house or building names, although similar principles could be applied to them or to names for new developments (for which the Commissioner offers their own advice to local authorities and housing developers). The panel may also have used additional guidelines.

The list was first published in 2018, and took years to put together. Upon creation, these lists were published under the Open Government Licence 3.0.

== List ==
Recommended standardised names		Other name/spelling not recommended	Type	Grid reference
Welsh	English	Other name/spelling not recommended	Type	Grid reference
Abermor-ddu	Abermor-ddu	Abermorddu	Settlement	SJ3056
Acstyn	Axton		Settlement	SJ1080
Afon-wen	Afon-wen	Afonwen	Settlement	SJ1371
Alltami	Alltami		Settlement	SJ2665
Aston	Aston		Settlement	SJ3067
Babell	Babell		Settlement	SJ1573
Bagillt	Bagillt		Settlement	SJ2275
Berth-ddu	Berth-ddu		Settlement	SJ2069
Berthen-gam	Berthen-gam		Settlement	SJ1179
Blaenau	Blaenau		Settlement	SJ2455
Bretton	Bretton		Settlement	SJ3563
Brychdyn	Broughton		Settlement	SJ3463
Bryncelyn	Bryncelyn		Settlement	SJ1876
Brynffordd	Brynford		Settlement	SJ1774
Bryn-y-bâl	Bryn-y-bâl	Bryn-y-baal	Settlement	SJ2664
Burntwood Pentre	Burntwood Pentre		Settlement	SJ2964
Bwcle	Buckley		Settlement	SJ2764
Cadole	Cadole		Settlement	SJ2062
Caer Estyn	Caer Estyn		Man-made feature	SJ3157
Caergwrle	Caergwrle		Settlement	SJ3057
Caerwys	Caerwys		Settlement	SJ1272
Calcoed	Calcoed		Settlement	SJ1774
Carmel	Carmel		Settlement	SJ1776
Cefn-y-bedd	Cefn-y-bedd		Settlement	SJ3156
Cei Connah	Connah's Quay		Settlement	SJ2969
Celstryn	Kelsterton		Settlement	SJ2770
Chwitffordd	Whitford		Settlement	SJ1478
Cilcain	Cilcain		Settlement	SJ1765
Coed-llai	Leeswood		Settlement	SJ2759
Coed-talon	Coed-talon	Coed Talon	Settlement	SJ2658
Cymau	Cymau		Settlement	SJ2956
Dobs Hill	Dobs Hill	Dobshill	Settlement	SJ3063
Drury	Drury		Settlement	SJ2964
Ewloe	Ewloe		Settlement	SJ2966
Ewloe Green	Ewloe Green		Settlement	SJ2866
Y Fflint	Flint		Settlement	SJ2472
Ffrith	Ffrith		Settlement	SJ2855
Ffynnongroyw	Ffynnongroyw	Ffynnongroew	Settlement	SJ1382
Gadlys	Gadlys		Settlement	SJ2174
Garden City	Garden City		Settlement	SJ3269
Garneddwen	Garneddwen		Area	SJ1770
Golftyn	Golftyn		Settlement	SJ2870
Gorsedd	Gorsedd		Settlement	SJ1576
Gronant	Gronant		Settlement	SJ0983
Gwaunysgor	Gwaunysgor	Gwaenysgor	Settlement	SJ0781
Gwernymynydd	Gwernymynydd		Settlement	SJ2162
Gwesbyr	Gwesbyr	Gwespyr	Settlement	SJ1183
Helygain	Halkyn		Settlement	SJ2171
Hendre	Hendre		Settlement	SJ1967
Higher Kinnerton	Higher Kinnerton		Settlement	SJ3261
Higher Shotton	Higher Shotton		Settlement	SJ3067
Yr Hôb	Hope		Settlement	SJ3058
Holway	Holway		Settlement	SJ1776
Kinnerton Green	Kinnerton Green		Settlement	SJ3361
Licswm	Licswm	Lixwm	Settlement	SJ1671
Little Mancot	Little Mancot		Settlement	SJ3166
Little Mountain	Little Mountain		Settlement	SJ2963
Llanasa	Llanasa		Settlement	SJ1081
Llaneurgain	Northop		Settlement	SJ2468
Llanfynydd	Llanfynydd		Settlement	SJ2756
Llannerch-y-môr	Llannerch-y-môr		Settlement	SJ1779
Lloc	Lloc		Settlement	SJ1476
Llong	Llong		Settlement	SJ2662
Maes-glas	Greenfield		Settlement	SJ1977
Marian	Marian		Settlement	SJ0979
Melin-wynt	Windmill		Settlement	SJ2071
Milwr	Milwr		Settlement	SJ1974
Moelycrio	Moelycrio		Settlement	SJ1969
Mostyn	Mostyn		Settlement	SJ1580
Mynyddisa	Mynyddisa	Mynydd Isa	Settlement	SJ2564
Mynydd-llan	Mynydd-llan		Settlement	SJ1572
Mynydd-y-Fflint	Flint Mountain		Settlement	SJ2370
Naid-y-march	Naid-y-march		Settlement	SJ1675
Nannerch	Nannerch		Settlement	SJ1669
Nercwys	Nercwys		Settlement	SJ2361
Oakenholt	Oakenholt		Settlement	SJ2671
Old Warren	Old Warren		Settlement	SJ3263
Padeswood	Padeswood		Settlement	SJ2762
Pantasaph	Pantasaph		Settlement	SJ1675
Pant-y-mwyn	Pant-y-mwyn	Pantymwyn	Settlement	SJ1964
Pant-y-Waco	Pant-y-Waco		Settlement	SJ1476
Penarlâg	Hawarden		Settlement	SJ3165
Penffordd-llan	Penffordd-llan		Settlement	SJ1377
Pentre	Pentre		Settlement	SJ1764
Pentre	Pentre		Settlement	SJ2459
Pentre	Pentre		Settlement	SJ3267
Pentre Cythrel (New Brighton before 2024)	New Brighton		Settlement	SJ2565
Pentre Helygain	Pentre Halkyn		Settlement	SJ1972
Pen-y-cefn	Pen-y-cefn		Settlement	SJ1175
Pen-y-ffordd	Pen-y-ffordd		Settlement	SJ1381
Pen-y-ffordd	Pen-y-ffordd	Penyffordd	Settlement	SJ3061
Penymynydd	Penymynydd		Settlement	SJ3062
Picton	Picton		Settlement	SJ1282
Pontblyddyn	Pontblyddyn		Settlement	SJ2760
Pontybodkin	Pontybodkin		Settlement	SJ2759
Queensferry	Queensferry		Settlement	SJ3168
Rhes-y-cae	Rhes-y-cae		Settlement	SJ1870
Rhewl Mostyn	Rhewl Mostyn		Settlement	SJ1580
Rhewl-fawr	Rhewl-fawr		Settlement	SJ1281
Rhosesmor	Rhosesmor		Settlement	SJ2168
Rhyd-y-mwyn	Rhyd-y-mwyn	Rhydymwyn	Settlement	SJ2066
Rhytalog	Rhytalog	Rhydtalog	Settlement	SJ2354
Saltney	Saltney		Settlement	SJ3764
Sandycroft	Sandycroft		Settlement	SJ3366
Sarn	Sarn		Settlement	SJ1179
Sealand	Sealand		Settlement	SJ3568
Shotton	Shotton		Settlement	SJ3068
Sychdyn	Sychdyn	Soughton	Settlement	SJ2466
Talacre	Talacre		Settlement	SJ1284
Tre Mostyn	Tre Mostyn		Settlement	SJ1479
Treffynnon	Holywell		Settlement	SJ1875
Trelawnyd	Trelawnyd		Settlement	SJ0879
Trelogan	Trelogan		Settlement	SJ1180
Treuddyn	Treuddyn		Settlement	SJ2558
Wal-wen	Wal-wen		Settlement	SJ2076
Y Waun	Gwernaffield		Settlement	SJ2064
Yr Wyddgrug	Mold		Settlement	SJ2363
Ysgeifiog	Ysgeifiog	Ysceifiog	Settlement	SJ1571
