= List of places in Flintshire =

Map of places in Flintshire compiled from this list
See the list of places in Wales for places in other principal areas.

This is a list of towns and villages in the principal area of Flintshire, Wales.

== A ==
- Afonwen
- Alltami
- Argoed
- Aston Park

== B ==
- Babell
- Bagillt
- Bretton
- Broughton
- Bryn-y-Baal
- Brynford
- Bryn Goleu
- Buckley

== C ==
- Cadole
- Caergwrle
- Caerwys
- Carmel
- Cefn-y-Bedd
- Cilcain
- Connah's Quay

== D ==
- Deeside
- Downing
- Drury

== E ==
- Ewloe

== F ==
- Flint
- Ffrith
- Ffynnongroyw

== G ==
- Glan-y-Don
- Greenfield
- Gronant
- Gwaenysgor
- Gwernaffield
- Gwernymynydd
- Gwespyr

== H ==
- Halkyn
- Hawarden
- Higher Kinnerton
- Holywell
- Hope

== L ==
- Leeswood
- Lixwm
- Llanasa
- Llanerch-y-Mor
- Llanfynydd
- Lloc

== M ==
- Mancot
- Milwr
- Mold
- Mostyn
- Mynydd Isa

== N ==
- Nannerch
- Nercwys
- New Brighton, Flintshire
- Northop
- Northop Hall

== O ==
- Oakenholt

== P ==
- Pantasaph
- Pantymwyn
- Pentre Halkyn
- Penyffordd

Pentre

== Q ==
- Queensferry

== R ==
- Rhosesmor
- Rhydymwyn

== S ==
- Sealand
- Shotton
- Sychdyn
- Saltney
- Saltney Ferry
- Sandycroft

== T ==
- Talacre
- Trelawnyd
- Treuddyn

== W ==
- Whelston
- Whitford

== Y ==
- Ysceifiog

== See also ==
- List of places in Wales
- List of places in Flintshire (categorised)
