= List of places in Flintshire (categorised) =

This is a categorised list of places in the principal area of Flintshire, north Wales. See the list of places in Wales for places in other principal areas.

== Administrative divisions ==
=== Electoral wards ===
See the article on electoral wards for an explanation of this list.

- Argoed
- Aston
- Bagillt East
- Bagillt West
- Broughton North East
- Broughton South
- Brynford
- Buckley Bistre East
- Buckley Bistre West
- Buckley Mountain
- Buckley Pentrobin
- Caergwrle
- Caerwys
- Cilcain
- Connah's Quay Central
- Connah's Quay Golftyn
- Connah's Quay South
- Connah's Quay Wepre
- Ewloe
- Ffynnongroyw
- Flint Castle
- Flint Coleshill
- Flint Oakenholt
- Flint Trelawny
- Greenfield
- Gronant
- Gwernaffield
- Gwernymynydd
- Halkyn
- Hawarden
- Higher Kinnerton
- Holywell Central
- Holywell East
- Holywell West
- Hope
- Leeswood
- Llanfynydd
- Mancot
- Mold Broncoed
- Mold East
- Mold South
- Mold West
- Mostyn
- New Brighton
- Northop
- Northop Hall
- Penyffordd
- Queensferry
- Saltney Mold Junction
- Saltney Stonebridge
- Sealand
- Shotton East
- Shotton Higher
- Shotton West
- Trelawnyd and Gwaenysgor
- Treuddyn
- Whitford

=== Communities ===
This is a list of local communities:

- Afon-wen
- Argoed
- Bagillt
- Broughton and Bretton
- Brynford
- Buckley
- Cadole
- Caerwys
- Cilcain
- Connah's Quay
- Flint
- Gwernaffield
- Gwernymynydd
- Halkyn
- Hawarden
- Higher Kinnerton
- Holywell
- Hope
- Leeswood
- Llanasa
- Llanfynydd
- Mold
- Mostyn
- Nannerch
- Nercwys
- New Brighton, Flintshire
- Northop
- Northop Hall
- Pentre Halkyn
- Penyffordd
- Queensferry
- Rhes-Y-Cae
- Rhosesmor
- Rhydymwyn
- Saltney
- Sealand
- Shotton
- Trelawnyd and Gwaenysgor
- Treuddyn
- Whitford
- Ysceifiog

== See also ==
- List of places in Flintshire
