= Caerwys railway station =

Former railway station in Flintshire, Wales

Caerwys
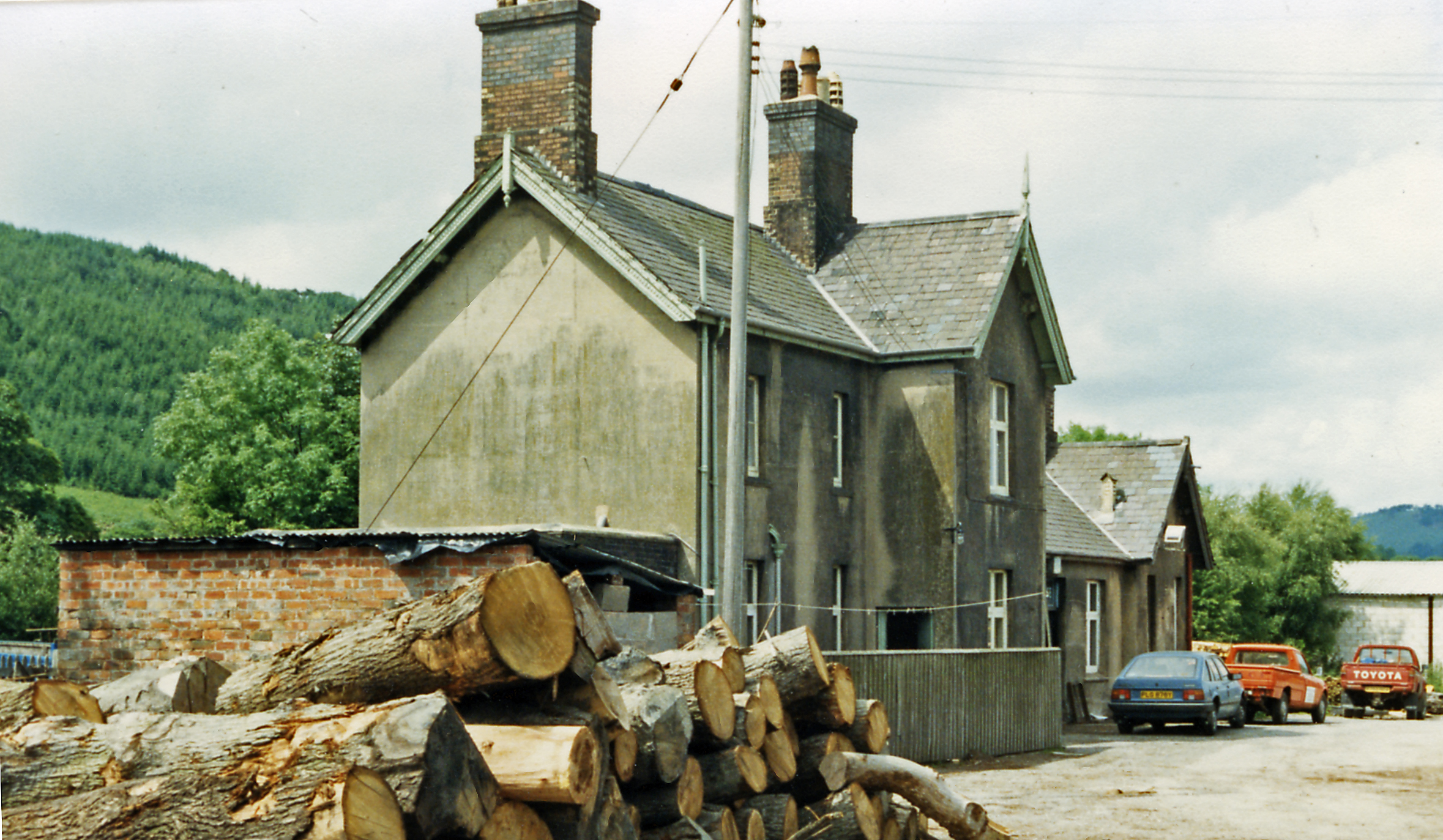
- The former station building in 1986

General information
- Location: Afonwen, Flintshire; Wales
- Coordinates: 53.2338°N 3.3103°W
- Grid reference: SJ126715
- Platforms: 2

Other information
- Status: Disused

History
- Original company: Mold and Denbigh Junction Railway
- Pre-grouping: London and North Western Railway
- Post-grouping: London, Midland and Scottish Railway

Key dates
- 6 September 1869: Opened
- 30 April 1962: Closed
Location

Caerwys railway station was a station in Afonwen, Flintshire, Wales. The station was named for nearby Caerwys, opened on 6 September 1869 and closed on 30 April 1962.

A major event at the station in 1910 was the marriage of the stationmaster, Mr John Hughes of Penmaenmawr, to Dorothy B. Openshaw of Afonwen. After all due ceremony, the newly-wed couple caught the 2.24pm train from Caerwys destined for Bournemouth, for their honeymoon.

Preceding station	Disused railways	Following station
Bodfari; Line and station closed	London and North Western Railway; Mold and Denbigh Junction Railway	Nannerch; Line and station closed
