= Llong =

Llong may refer to:

- Llong, Flintshire, Wales
  - Llong railway station, a closed station in Wales
- Nigel Llong (born 1969), an English cricket umpire and former first-class cricketer
