= Star Crossing Halt railway station =

Former railway station in Flintshire, Wales

Star Crossing Halt

General information
- Location: Between Nannerch and Cilcain, Flintshire; Wales
- Coordinates: 53.2015°N 3.2357°W
- Grid reference: SJ175678
- Platforms: 2

Other information
- Status: Disused

History
- Original company: Mold and Denbigh Junction Railway
- Pre-grouping: London and North Western Railway
- Post-grouping: London, Midland and Scottish Railway

Key dates
- 2 November 1914: Opened
- 1 January 1917: closed
- 1 July 1919: opened
- 30 April 1962: Closed
Location

Star Crossing Halt railway station was a station between Nannerch and Cilcain, Flintshire, Wales. The station was opened on 2 November 1914, closed in 1916 due to WW1, but re-opened in the summer of 1919, and closed finally on 30 April 1962. Today the stationmaster's house is in use as private residence and the platforms and a waiting shelter are still extant.

Preceding station	Disused railways	Following station
Nannerch; Line and station closed	London and North Western Railway; Mold and Denbigh Junction Railway	Rhydymwyn; Line and station closed
