= Caerwys Rectory =

Clergy house in Flintshire, Wales

- Location within Flintshire

General information
- Location: Caerwys, Flintshire, Wales
- Coordinates: 53.2449°N 3.3083°W

Caerwys Rectory is a late Georgian house in Caerwys, Flintshire in northeast Wales. It is a listed building. It is a 3-bay house of 2 storeys with an attic. In the 1920s a veranda and bay windows were added. Caerwys Rectory was the birthplace of the antiquary Angharad Llwyd (1780–1866), daughter of the rector John Llwyd (1733–93).
