= Padeswood and Buckley railway station =

Former railway station in Flintshire, Wales

Padeswood & Buckley

General information
- Location: Padeswood, Flintshire; Wales
- Coordinates: 53.1526°N 3.0855°W
- Grid reference: SJ274623
- Platforms: 2

Other information
- Status: Disused

History
- Original company: Mold Railway
- Pre-grouping: London and North Western Railway
- Post-grouping: London, Midland and Scottish Railway

Key dates
- c. October 1850: Opened
- 6 January 1958: Closed
Location

Padeswood & Buckley railway station was a station in Padeswood, Flintshire, Wales. The station was opened around October 1850 and closed on 6 January 1958. Only the stationmaster's house remains as a private residence.

Preceding station	Disused railways	Following station
Llong; Line and station closed	London and North Western Railway; Mold Railway	Hope Exchange; Line and station closed
