= Mold railway station =

Former railway station in Flintshire, Wales

Mold

General information
- Location: Mold, Flintshire; Wales
- Coordinates: 53.1677°N 3.1384°W
- Grid reference: SJ240640
- Platforms: 2

Other information
- Status: Disused

History
- Original company: Mold and Denbigh Junction Railway
- Pre-grouping: London and North Western Railway
- Post-grouping: London, Midland and Scottish Railway

Key dates
- 14 August 1849: Opened
- 30 April 1962: closed for passengers
- 4 May 1964: Closed for freight
Location

Mold railway station in Mold, Flintshire, Wales, opened on 14 August 1849 as the terminus of a double-track line from the Chester and Holyhead Railway, starting at Saltney near Chester. It was joined in September 1869 by Mold and Denbigh Junction Railway. In January 1892 a line opened between Mold and Coed Talon, which was extended in 1898 to Brymbo.

== Closure ==
The extended service ceased in 1950. Mold station closed for passengers in 1962, and closed completely on 4 May 1964. The site of the station has been occupied since the 1990s by a supermarket.

Preceding station	Disused railways	Following station
Terminus	London and North Western Railway; Mold Railway	Llong; Line and station closed
Rhydymwyn; Line and station closed	London and North Western Railway; Mold and Denbigh Junction Railway	Terminus
