= Bodfari railway station =

Former railway station in Denbighshire, Wales

Bodfari
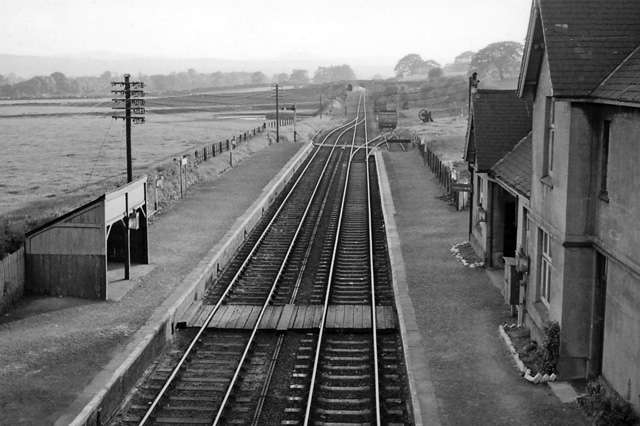
- Bodfari railway station in 1961

General information
- Location: Wales
- Coordinates: 53.2190°N 3.3574°W
- Grid reference: SJ126715
- Platforms: 2

Other information
- Status: Disused

History
- Original company: Mold and Denbigh Junction Railway
- Pre-grouping: London and North Western Railway
- Post-grouping: London, Midland and Scottish Railway; London Midland Region of British Railways

Key dates
- 6 September 1869: Opened
- 30 April 1962: Closed
Location

Bodfari railway station was opened on 6 September 1869 by the Mold and Denbigh Junction Railway. Following the Railways Act of 1921 the line became part of the LMS. The station was located to the west of the road bridge on the A541 close to the village. Station buildings were on the Chester bound platform and there was a shelter on the Denbigh platform. The station closed in April 1962.

The station site today is a private residence but the station building is still standing.

Preceding station	Disused railways	Following station
Denbigh; Line and station closed	London and North Western Railway; Mold and Denbigh Junction Railway	Caerwys; Line and station closed
