= Llong railway station =

Former railway station in Flintshire, Wales

Llong
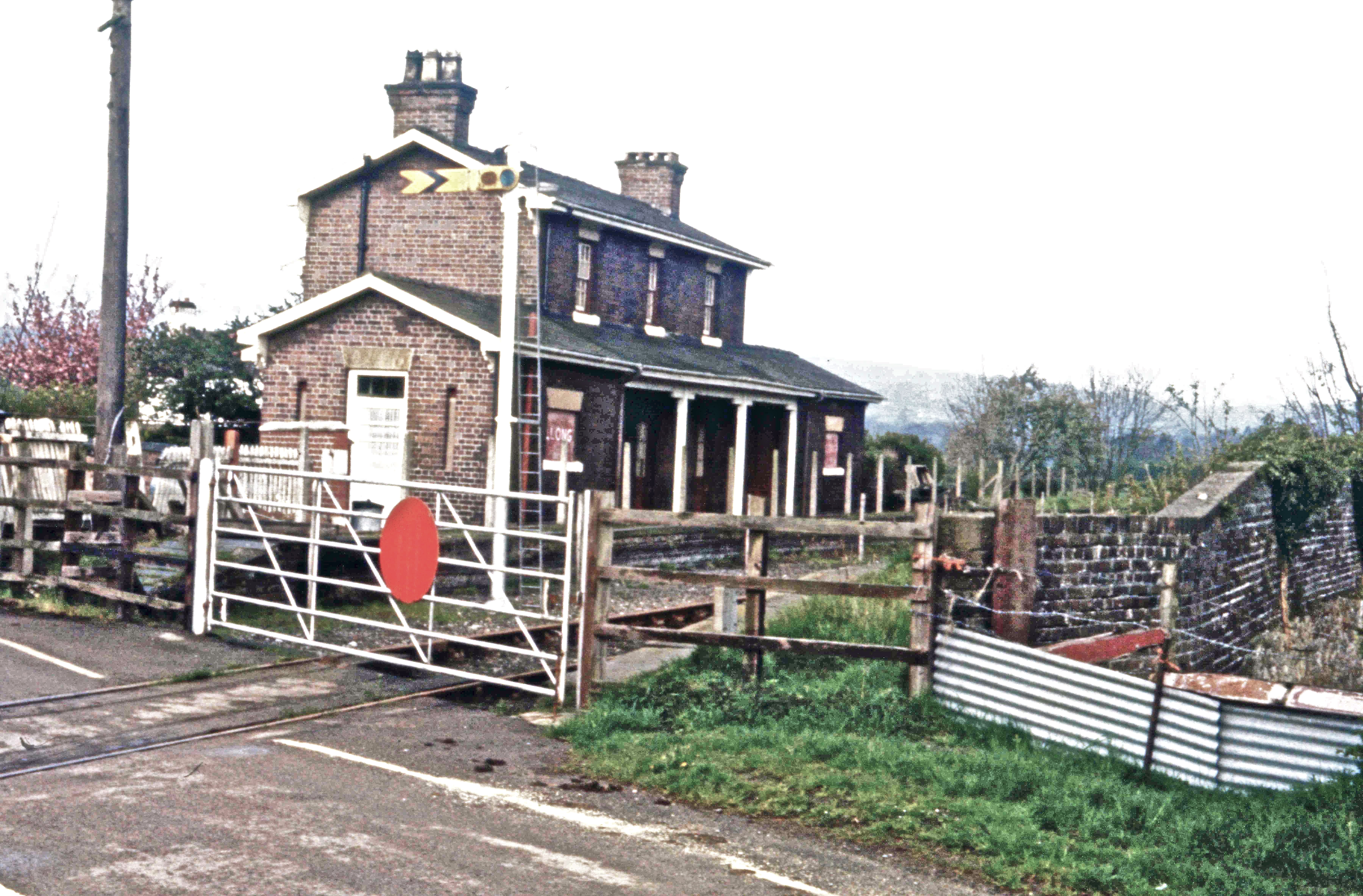
- The former station in 1986

General information
- Location: Llong, Flintshire; Wales
- Coordinates: 53.1530°N 3.1062°W
- Grid reference: SJ261623
- Platforms: 2

Other information
- Status: Privately owned

History
- Original company: Mold Railway
- Pre-grouping: London and North Western Railway
- Post-grouping: London, Midland and Scottish Railway

Key dates
- 14 August 1849: Opened
- 1 January 1917: closed
- 5 May 1919: opened
- 30 April 1962: Closed
Location

Llong railway station was a station in Llong, Flintshire, Wales. The station was opened on 14 August 1849 and closed on 30 April 1962. The station building is now a private residence.

In 1947 there were 8 trains a day each way.

| Preceding station | Disused railways | Following station |
|---|---|---|
| Mold; Line and station closed | London and North Western Railway; Mold Railway | Padeswood and Buckley; Line and station closed |
