= Nannerch railway station =

Former railway station in Flintshire, Wales

Nannerch

General information
- Location: Nannerch, Flintshire; Wales
- Coordinates: 53.2121°N 3.2454°W
- Grid reference: SJ169691
- Platforms: 2

Other information
- Status: Disused

History
- Original company: Mold and Denbigh Junction Railway
- Pre-grouping: London and North Western Railway
- Post-grouping: London, Midland and Scottish Railway

Key dates
- 6 September 1869: Opened
- 30 April 1962: Closed
Location

Nannerch railway station was a station in Nannerch, Flintshire, Wales. The station was opened on 6 September 1869 and closed on 30 April 1962.

| Preceding station | Disused railways | Following station |
|---|---|---|
| Caerwys; Line and station closed | London and North Western Railway; Mold and Denbigh Junction Railway | Star Crossing Halt; Line and station closed |
