= Caerwys Town Hall =

Municipal Building in Caerwys, Wales

- Neuadd y Dref Caerwys (Welsh)
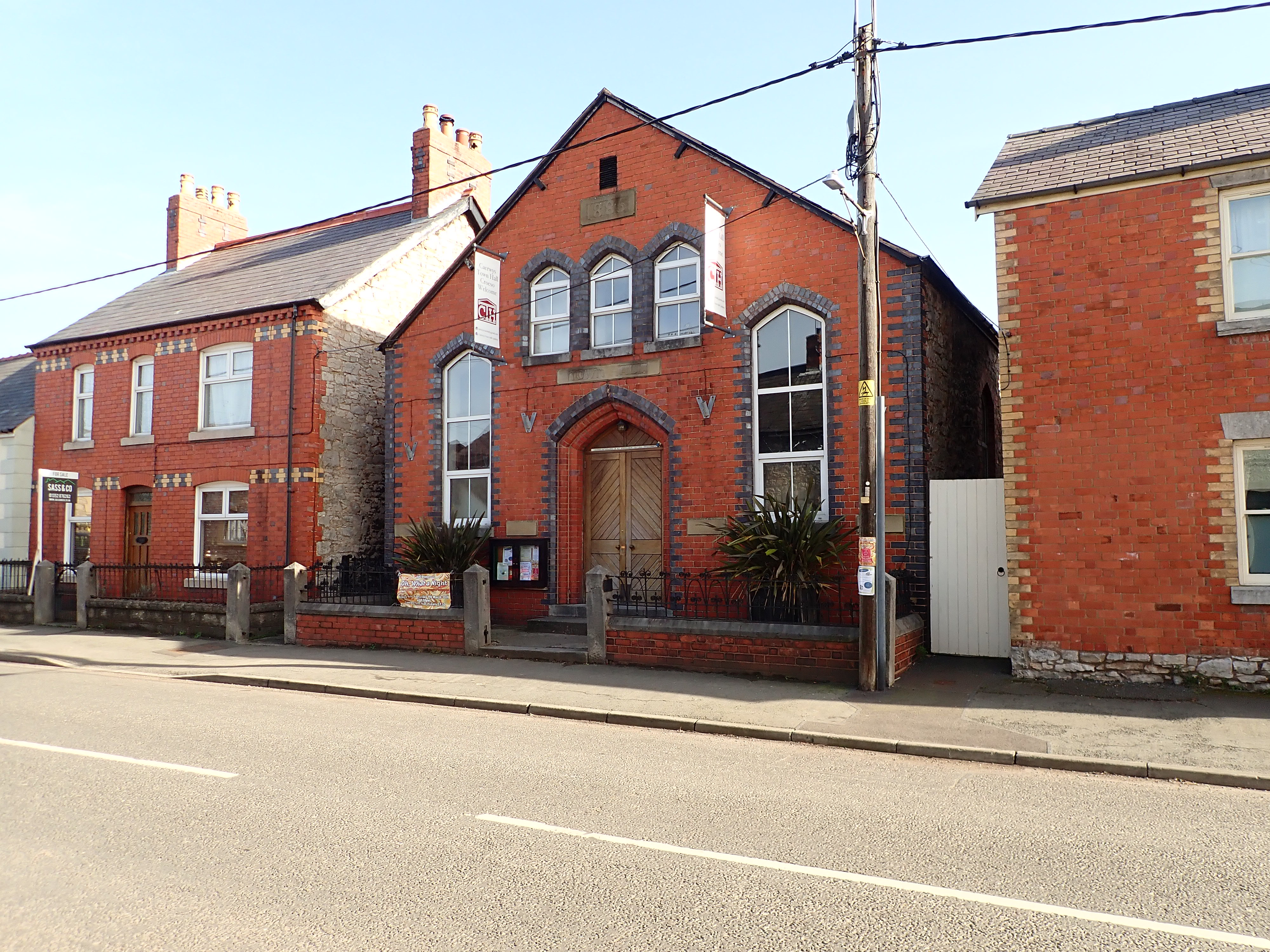
- Caerwys Town Hall

- Shown in Flintshire
- 53.2457°N 3.3070°W
- Location: High Street, Caerwys

History
- Built: 1885

Site notes
- Architectural style: Neoclassical style

Caerwys Town Hall (Welsh: Neuadd y Dref Caerwys) is a municipal building on South Street in Caerwys, Flintshire, Wales. The structure is currently used as a community events venue.

== History ==
The first municipal building in the town was the old town hall which was a medieval building on the south side of the High Street, behind Compton House. The building was the meeting place of the borough officials who had convened since the borough was created in 1290. It was in this building that the eisteddfods, arranged by the Mostyn family, took place in 1523 and 1568. Also, the Gwyneddigion Society made an attempt to restore their annual literary congress there in 1798. However, by the mid-19th century the town hall had been demolished, borough officials were no longer appointed, and the borough was later abolished under the Municipal Corporations Act 1883.

In 1874, civic leaders decided to commission a new town hall and to finance it by public subscription. Subscribers included the local member of parliament, Lord Richard Grosvenor. The site they selected was on the east side of South Street. The building was designed in the neoclassical style, built in red brick and was completed in 1885. The design involved a symmetrical main frontage of three bays facing onto South Street. The central bay contained an arched doorway with an archivolt; there were three small arched windows and a date stone in the gable above. The outer bays were fenestrated by two tall arched windows. Internally, the principal rooms were the main hall and the committee room on the first floor.

During the Second World War, the building was used as a school for children evacuated from London and other cities. The building was refurbished with a grant from Delyn Borough Council between 1986 and 1987, enabling it to continue to be used as a community events venue with a programme of concerts, theatre performances, and film shows.
