= St Bartholomew's Church, Sealand =

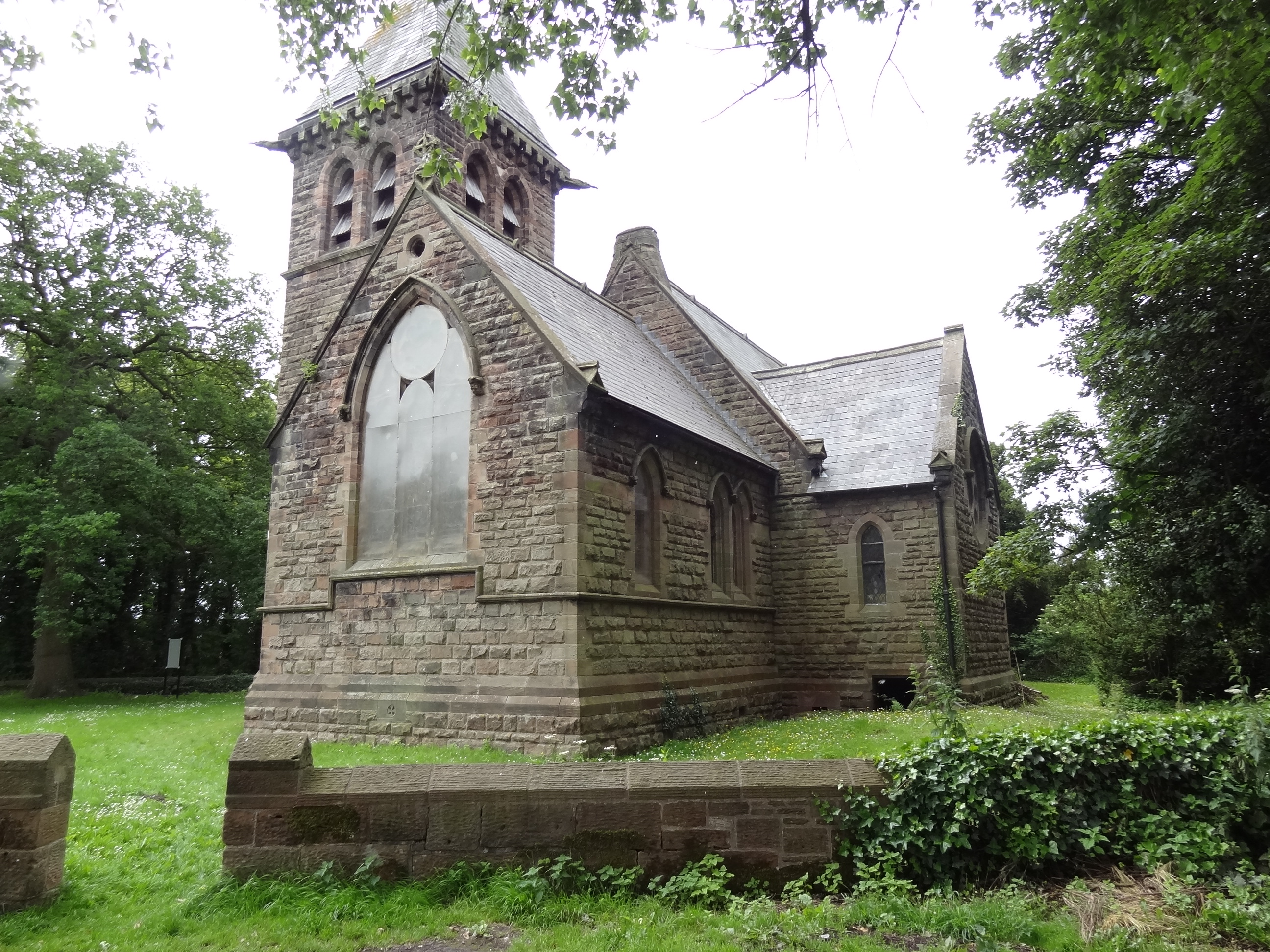
- St Bartholomew's Church, Sealand
- 53.2128°N 2.9709°W
- OS grid reference: SJ 352 688
- Location: Sealand, Flintshire
- Country: Wales
- Denomination: Anglican

History
- Dedication: St Bartholomew
- Consecrated: 15 October 1867

Architecture
- Heritage designation: Grade II
- Designated: 29 March 1993
- Architect: John Douglas
- Architectural type: Church
- Style: Gothic Revival
- Groundbreaking: 1865
- Completed: 1867

Specifications
- Materials: Sandstone

Administration
- Province: Wales
- Diocese: St Asaph
- Archdeaconry: Wrexham
- Deanery: Hawarden

St Bartholomew's Church, Sealand, is in Sealand, Flintshire, Wales and in the diocese of St Asaph The church is designated as a Grade II listed building.

== History ==
The church was built between 1865 and 1867 to a design by the Chester architect John Douglas. It was one of Douglas's earliest churches and is in the High Victorian style of Gothic Revival architecture. The site for the church was given by the River Dee Company who also partly paid for it. It was consecrated on 15 October 1867.

== Architecture and contents ==
The church is built in sandstone and coursed rock-faced red from Helsby, Cheshire. Its plan consists of a nave and a chancel, with a small north transept to contain the organ and a tower on the south side of the chancel containing a vestry. The church is without aisles and is "not large, but expensively done" with an ashlar interior. The tower has a pyramid spire and a turret against its lower part. The stained glass in the east window of 1867 is by Hardman & Co. and was donated by Douglas. The stained glass in the west window dates from 1880 and is by Kempe.

== See also ==
- List of new churches by John Douglas
