= St Michael's Church, Brynford =

Church in Flintshire, Wales

Coordinates: 53.2605°N 3.2330°W

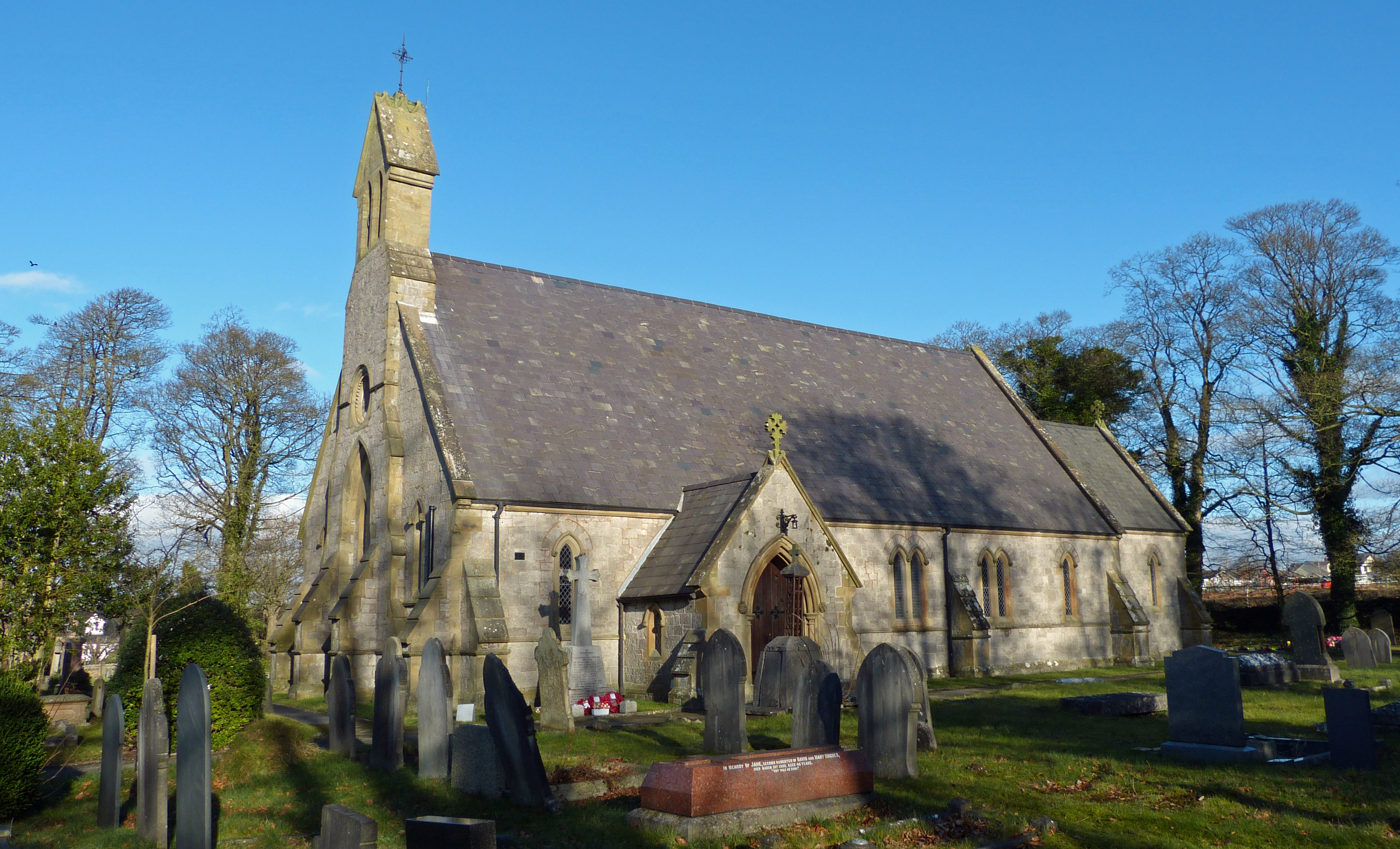
St Michael's Church, Brynford

St Michael's Church, also known as Brynford Parish Church, is a Grade II listed Church in Wales church in Brynford, Flintshire, northeast Wales, to the southwest of Holywell. The foundation stone was laid by the Bishop of St. Asaph on 6 October 1851, and it was consecrated on 12 July 1853. The architect was Thomas Henry Wyatt. It is designated as a Grade II listed building

Two Bronze Age round barrows known as Clwt Militia (Militia Patch) are located on Holywell Golf Club, about 0.65 miles (1 km) north-northwest of the church.
