= Moel y Gaer, Rhosesmor =

Hillfort in Flintshire

Coordinates: 53.2126°N 3.1827°W

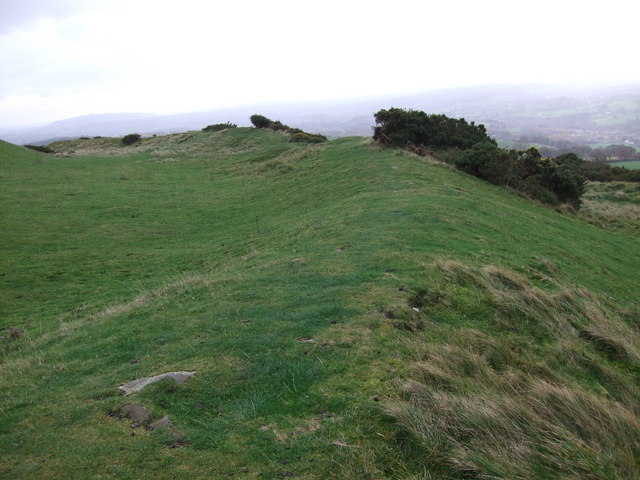
Remains of the rampart of Moel y Gaer

Moel y Gaer (Welsh for "bald hill of the fortress") is an Iron Age hillfort located on a summit at the southern end of Halkyn Mountain, overlooking the village of Rhosesmor, Flintshire, Wales. It is a well-preserved hillfort overlooking the Dee Estuary. Excavations in the early 1970s revealed a sequence of defensive structures made of timber and several phases of building work inside the ramparts.

== The hillfort ==
Excavations suggest that the site was occupied, perhaps sporadically, from the Neolithic period to sometime before the Roman conquest of the area. Remains of a timber long house on the hill summit have been dated to the third millennium BC and may represent the earliest human occupation of the region. Defensive construction at the site began around the late seventh century BC, and at first consisted of a timber palisade enclosing a settlement of timber roundhouses. The palisade was later replaced by a stone-and-earth rampart and a ditch.

Much of the archaeological work at Moel y Gaer was carried out in the early 1970s, before the planned construction of a 500,000-gallon storage reservoir on the hilltop in 1979 destroyed a portion of the site. The excavations showed that there had been three phases of development within the ramparts. In phase one, rings of postholes showed where circular huts had stood, the doorways having two or four postholes outside the main ring. In phase two, the round huts were differently constructed, the roof resting on a wall of rammed stakes. Also in phase two were rectangular buildings, with four large posts at the corners, the huts laid out in neat rows in a formal layout. The site seems to have been abandoned after this for a while, after which it was reoccupied, with the third phase construction of rectangular, sleeper-beam buildings, in a non-formal, scattered layout.

== See also ==
- List of hillforts in Wales
