= Rhydymwyn railway station =

Former railway station in Flintshire, Wales

Rhydymwyn
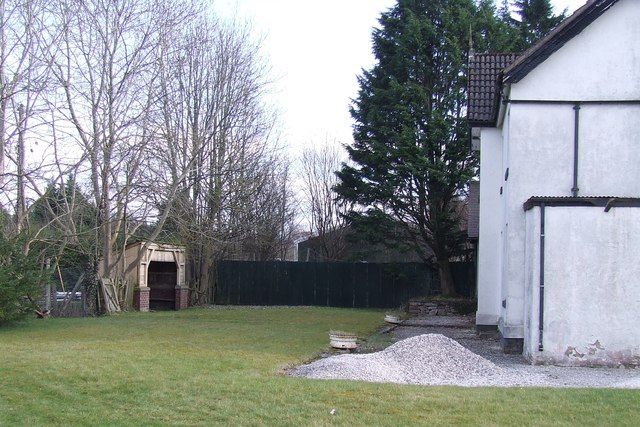

General information
- Location: Rhydymwyn, Flintshire; Wales
- Coordinates: 53.1921°N 3.1887°W
- Grid reference: SJ207668
- Platforms: 2

Other information
- Status: Disused

History
- Original company: Mold and Denbigh Junction Railway
- Pre-grouping: London and North Western Railway
- Post-grouping: London, Midland and Scottish Railway

Key dates
- 6 September 1869: Opened
- 30 April 1962: Closed to passengers
- 4 May 1964: Closed
Location

Rhydymwyn railway station was a station in Rhydymwyn, Flintshire, Wales. The station was opened on 6 September 1869, closed to passengers on 30 April 1962 and closed completely on 4 May 1964. Today the station buildings are still extant although the track bed between the platforms has been infilled. Crossing gates can still be found in undergrowth.

Preceding station	Disused railways	Following station
Star Crossing Halt; Line and station closed	London and North Western Railway; Mold and Denbigh Junction Railway	Mold; Line and station closed
