= Cilcain Hall =

Country house in Flintshire, Wales

Coordinates: 53.2055°N 3.2203°W

Cilcain Hall is a country house 2 miles (3 km) north-northeast of the village of Cilcain, Flintshire, Wales (grid reference SJ185683). It was built in 1875–77 for W. B. Buddicom and designed by the Chester architect John Douglas. The hall is built in stone and has a red tile roof. Its architecture includes Elizabethan elements. Douglas also designed an entrance lodge which was built around the same time on the main road. The lodge is no longer present.
