= St John the Evangelist's Church, Mold =

Church in Flintshire, Wales

Coordinates: 53.1686°N 3.1410°W

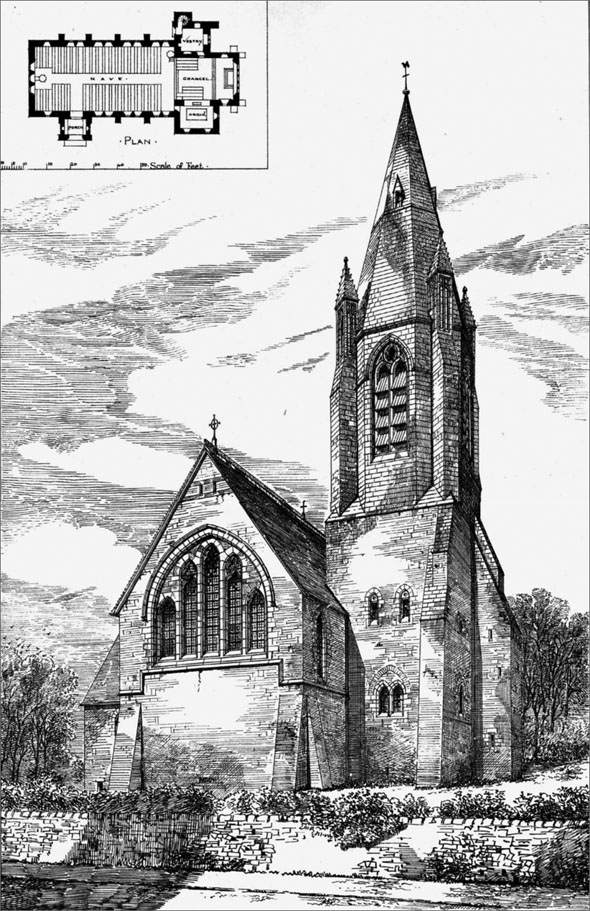
Architect's drawing of St John the Evangelist's Church, Mold

St John the Evangelist's Church, was a Welsh church in King Street, Mold, Flintshire, North Wales (grid reference SJ238641). It is now redundant as a church; it has been divided and is used as a church hall. It is designated by Cadw as a Grade II listed building.

The church was built in 1878 to 1879 and designed by the Chester architect John Douglas. It is in brown rubble stone with dressings of red Helsby sandstone and a red-tiled roof. The interior is broad, without aisles.

== See also ==
- List of new churches by John Douglas
- List of churches in Flintshire
