= Mold and Denbigh Junction Railway =

Railway in the UK

Coordinates: 53°12′49″N 3°14′40″W

The Mold and Denbigh Junction Railway was a railway company that built a 16-mile (26 km) railway line in North Wales. It formed a link between the Mold Railway (from Chester) and the Vale of Clwyd Railway towards Rhyl.

The line opened in 1869. Serving a largely rural district, it never attracted much business, and the passenger service was withdrawn in 1962. Ordinary goods traffic ceased not long after, and the line closed completely in 1983.

== Conception ==
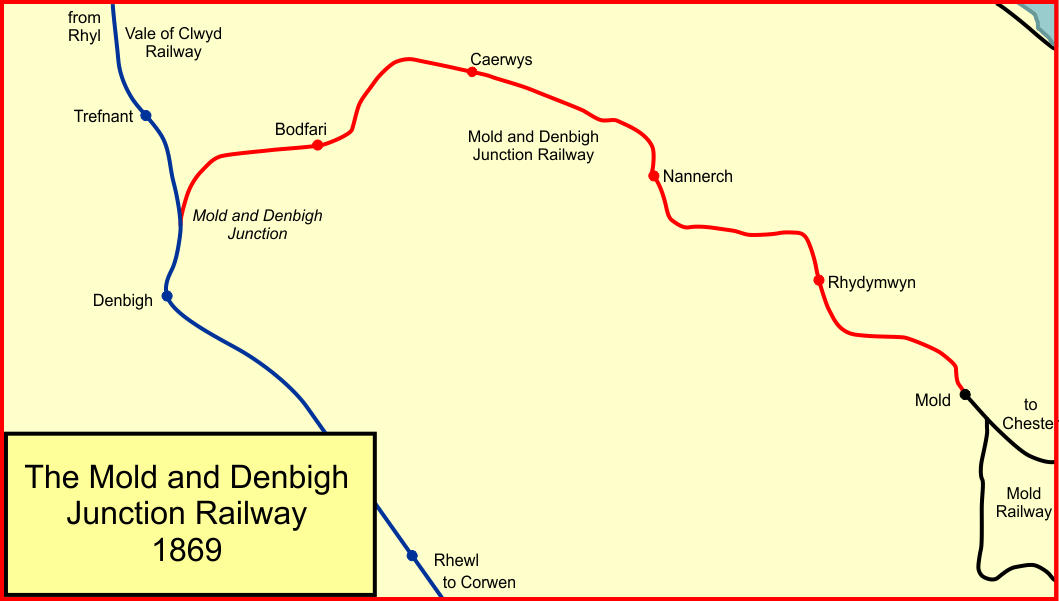
The Mold and Denbigh Junction Railway

The Chester and Holyhead Railway was opened throughout in 1850, and it was absorbed by the London and North Western Railway in 1858. The Great Western Railway was the principal competitor of the LNWR in the area, and the GWR had taken steps to reach Rhyl, an important regional centre. It hoped to do this by taking control of a series of local railways, northwards from the Vale of Llangollen Railway at Corwen, which itself branched from the GWR at Ruabon. The GWR attempted to take control of the Denbigh, Ruthin and Corwen Railway as well as the Vale of Clwyd line.

In 1860, the London and North Western Railway took steps to fend off this incursion, supporting a railway from its Mold terminus through the River Alyn and Wheeler valleys and joining the Vale of Clwyd Railway just north of Denbigh. The Great Western Railway lost interest and the threat abated.

Mold and Denbigh Junction Railway Act 1861
- Act of Parliament
- Parliament of the United Kingdom
- Long title: An Act for making a Railway from the Mold Branch of the Chester and Holyhead Railway at Mold to the Vale of Clwyd Railway, to be called "The Mold and Denbigh Junction Railway;" and for other Purposes.
- Citation: 24 & 25 Vict. c. ccxlvii

Dates
- Royal assent: 6 August 1861

A local railway between Mold and Denbigh was still of value, and local interests promoted the Mold and Denbigh Junction Railway. The company was incorporated by the Mold and Denbigh Junction Railway Act 1861 (24 & 25 Vict. c. ccxlvii) on 6 August 1861 to build a 16-mile (26 km) link railway between the Mold Railway and the Vale of Clwyd Railway. The Mold Railway connected Chester and Mold, and the Vale of Clwyd Railway connected Rhyl and Denbigh.

== Construction ==
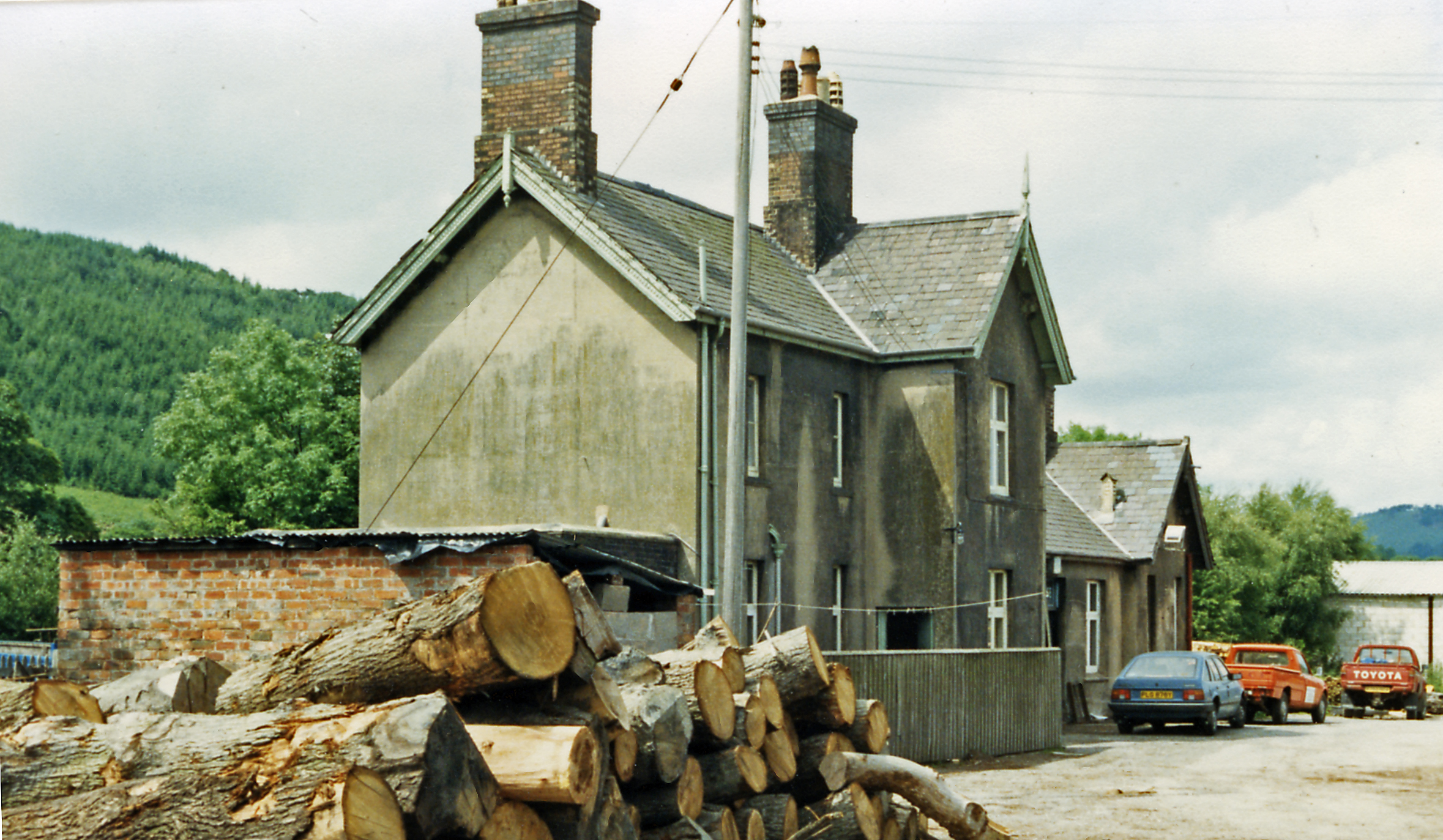
Caerwys in 1986 after closure

The new company was unable to raise the funds for construction of its line, until Richard Samuel France, a railway contractor and mineowner, offered to build the line in exchange for shares. He made good progress until the national financial crisis of 1866, when he became financially embarrassed, and was unable to continue. At that time, of the £432,000 raised in share capital, only £1,360 was in the name of others than France himself. Many landowners were still owed money for the land acquired by the company, and there was much construction work still to be accomplished.

Between Bodfari and Trefnant and Denbigh there was to be a triangular junction. The main line running towards Rhyl and joining the Vale of Clwyd at Trefnant and a cut off heading south west towards Denbigh, joining the Vale of Clwyd about a mile north of the town's station and running parallel. The northern leg of the triangle was abandoned and only partly constructed with a few hundred metres visible at the east end.

Mold and Denbigh Junction Railway (Branches, Alterations, &c.) Act 1866
- Act of Parliament
- Parliament of the United Kingdom
- Long title: An Act to enable the Mold and Denbigh Junction Railway Company to make Branch Railways and a Deviation, and to alter their authorized Railway; and for other Purposes.
- Citation: 29 & 30 Vict. c. ccl

Dates
- Royal assent: 23 July 1866

Text of statute as originally enacted

Mold and Denbigh Junction Railway Act 1867
- Act of Parliament
- Parliament of the United Kingdom
- Long title: An Act to enable the Mold and Denbigh Junction Railway Company to run over and use Portions of the Railways of certain other Railway Companies; and to revive and extend the Powers of Purchase over certain Lands; and to extend the Time limited by "The Mold and Denbigh Junction Railway Act, 1861," for the Completion of Works; and for other Purposes.
- Citation: 30 & 31 Vict. c. clxiv

Dates
- Royal assent: 25 July 1867

Text of statute as originally enacted

Notwithstanding the shortage of the company's own funds, it had obtained powers in the Mold and Denbigh Junction Railway (Branches, Alterations, &c.) Act 1866 (29 & 30 Vict. c. ccl) to build a line paralleling the Mold Railway to join the Wrexham, Mold and Connah's Quay Railway; powers for a 22-mile line to Llandudno were refused in that session. Despite the financial situation, in 1867 the M&DJR obtained a further act of Parliament, the Mold and Denbigh Junction Railway Act 1867 (30 & 31 Vict. c. clxiv), for running powers over part of the Wrexham, Mold and Connah's Quay Railway, and also (belatedly) to Denbigh.

Richard Samuel France now disappeared from the scene, and the only hope of completing the line lay with the LNWR, and that company funded the completion of the line.

== Opening ==
The line opened on 12 September 1869 and was worked by the LNWR, although the Mold and Denbigh Junction Railway company remained independent.

== 1895 passenger train service and after ==
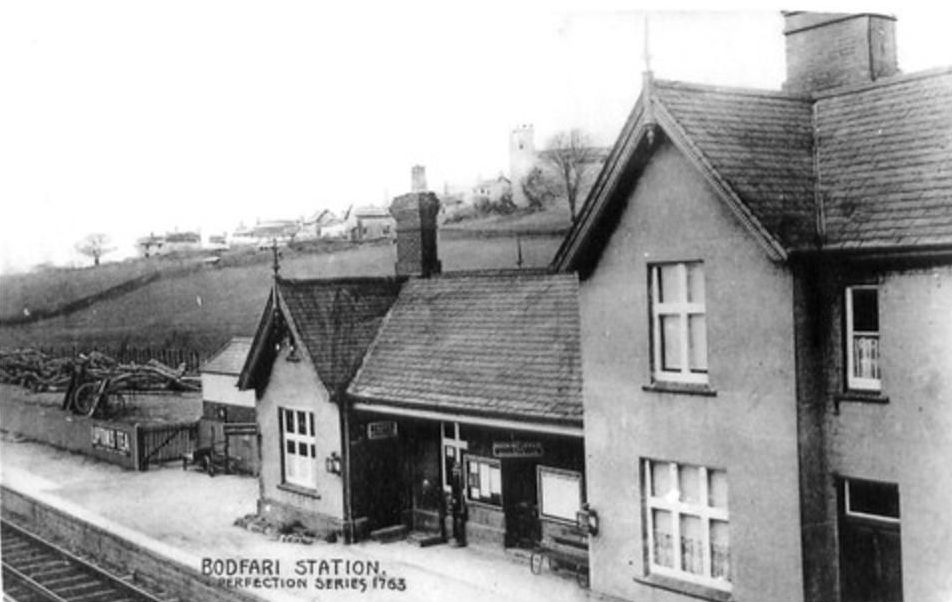
Bodfari station

Bradshaw's Guide shows the passenger train service in 1895: there were seven trains each way daily, all but one stopping at all stations.

By 1919 there were two return journeys on the line by a "motor train".

== 1923 and after ==
In 1923 the main line railways of Great Britain were "grouped" under the Railways Act 1921; the LNWR was a constituent of the new London Midland and Scottish Railway. The Mold and Denbigh Junction Railway, of course only a financial shell, was schemed into the LMS.

The LMS increased the passenger train service, with eleven trains each way between Chester and Denbigh, as well as three between Denbigh and Mold, with some of the workings extended to and from Ruthin or Corwen. A motor train worked three round trips from Denbigh.

== Decline ==
Passenger trains on the line were withdrawn on 30 April 1962, but goods and parcels traffic to Mold from Chester continued. The closure had been planned, and announced, for September 1961 but the arrangements for alternative transport were not completed, and the closure was deferred. Many local residents made other arrangements anyway and carryings in the final months were very low. The track from Dolfechlas Crossing to the junction with the Vale of Clwyd line just north of Denbigh was lifted in 1963. However, limestone powder traffic continued to originate at Ruby Limeworks and goods trains also served the Synthite chemical works (a factory producing formaldehyde) just north of Mold. Jones Balers (latterly Aliss Chalmers) exported straw balers to Europe on ferry wagon flats from Mold for many years in the 1960 and 70s.

On 1 January 1968 the line was further reduced in operational length, consisting only of a stub at Mold to the Synthite works. Access to it was made from Wrexham over the former Wrexham, Mold and Connah's Quay Railway to Hope, and then by the connecting spur to the former Mold Railway there.

The line from the Synthite works to Rhydymwyn was still in place, and was revived in 1974 for the transportation inwards of oil pipe sections for the Anglesey to Ellesmere Port pipe line, which uses part of the old Mold and Denbigh Junction Railway trackbed near Afonwen. When the Synthite works transferred from rail to road haulage on 15/3/1983 the railway activity in the area ceased completely.

== Residual structures ==
Mold station buildings survived until 1988, occupied by a builders' merchant and latterly a Tesco Superstore. The original M&DJR station buildings at Rhydymwyn, Caerwys and Bodfari survive as private dwellings.

== Topography and station list ==
The route climbed the Alyn Valley to Rhyd-y-mwyn. The summit of the line was on the Mold side of Star Crossing Halt, after the line passed through a narrow limestone gorge, crossing the main road twice on plate girder bridges at Hendre to reach the watershed. The line then descended towards Denbigh at 1 in 80 down the Wheeler Valley.

- Mold; opened 14 August 1849; closed 30 April 1962;
- Rhydymwyn; opened 6 September 1869; closed 30 April 1962;
- Star Crossing Halt; opened 2 November 1914; closed 1 January 1917; reopened 1 July 1919; closed 30 April 1962;
- Nannerch; opened 6 September 1869; closed 30 April 1962;
- Caerwys; opened 6 September 1869; closed 30 April 1962;
- Bodfari; opened 6 September 1869; closed 30 April 1962;
- Denbigh opened 5 October 1858; replaced by permanent station December 1860; closed 30 April 1962.
