= Simwnt Fychan =

Simwnt Fychan (c. 1530 – 1606) was a Welsh language poet and genealogist, probably born in Llanfair Dyffryn Clwyd in north-east Wales.

He was a colleague of the poet and scholar Gruffudd Hiraethog.

In 1567 Queen Elizabeth I of England appointed a commission to control the activities of "minstrels, rhymers and bards", in Wales. They were summoned to meet at Caerwys and Simwnt Fychan was appointed "pencerdd", i.e. the senior bard.
