= Garden City, Flintshire =

Village in Flintshire, Wales

Coordinates: 53.215°N 3.009°W

Garden City
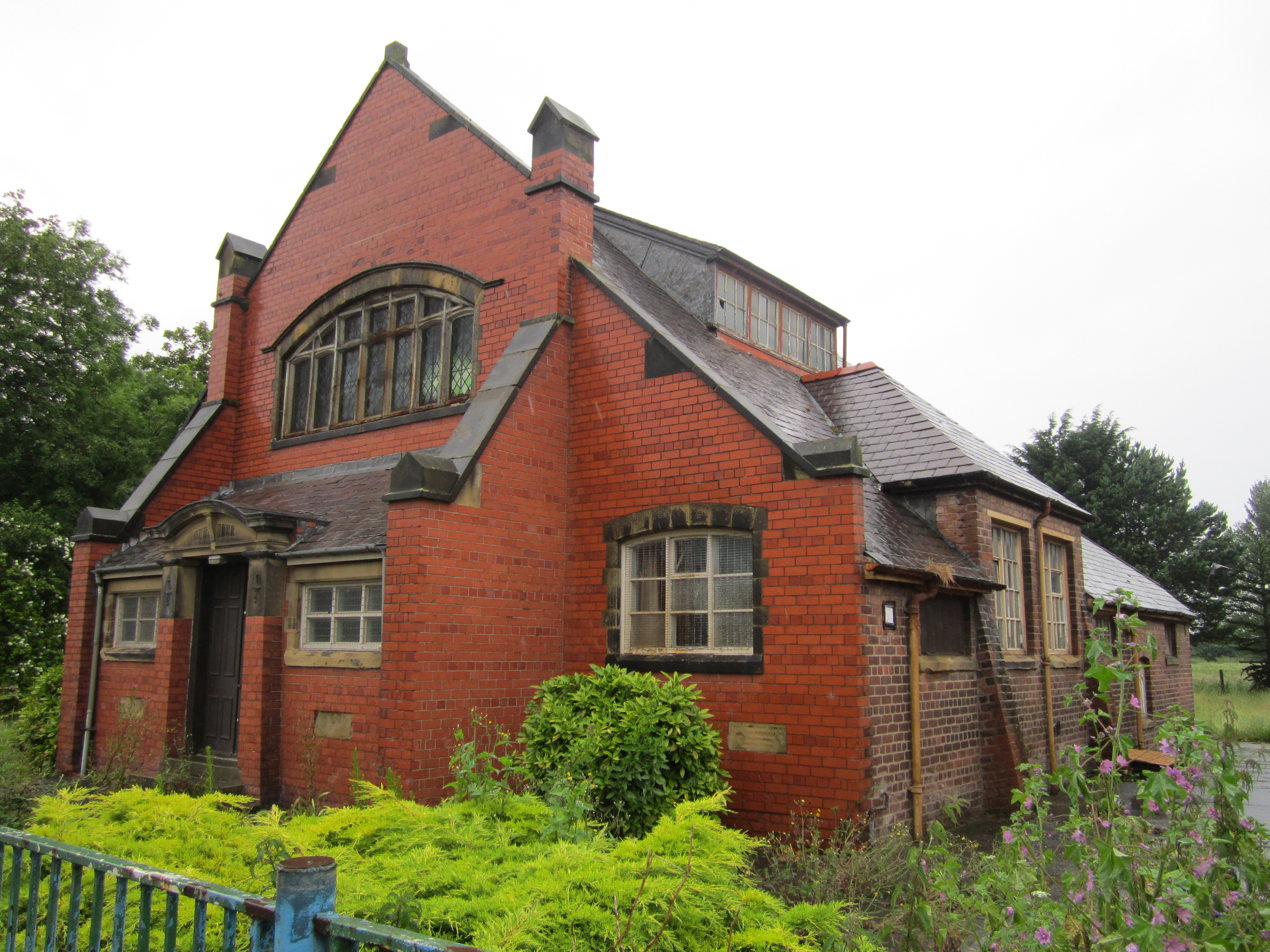
- Church building, Garden City

- Location within Flintshire
- Population: 1,407
- OS grid reference: SJ326691
- Principal area: Flintshire
- Preserved county: Clwyd
- Country: Wales
- Sovereign state: United Kingdom
- Post town: DEESIDE
- Postcode district: CH5
- Dialling code: 01244
- Police: North Wales
- Fire: North Wales
- Ambulance: Welsh
- UK Parliament: Alyn and Deeside
- Senedd Cymru – Welsh Parliament: Alyn and Deeside

Garden City (Welsh: Dinas Gardd) is a village in the Sealand area of Flintshire, Wales. The village began as a planned community for workers at the nearby steel works in Shotton, in accordance with company policy to give their workers decent housing. The village was originally intended to be called "Sealand Garden Suburb" and was planned to be four times bigger, but construction was halted by the advent of the First World War.

Wirral band OMD recorded the 1984 track "Garden City", a successor to 1981's "Sealand".
