= Calcoed =

Village in Flintshire, Wales

Coordinates: 53.25°N 3.24°W

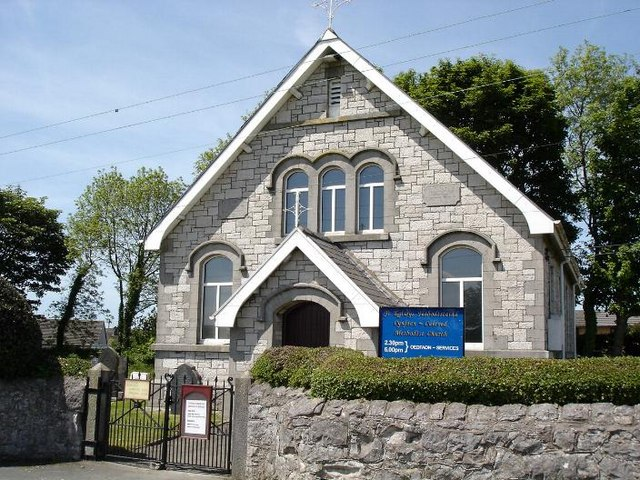
- Cynfaen Chapel, Calcoed

- Location within Flintshire
- OS grid reference: SJ1774
- Community: Brynford
- Principal area: Flintshire
- Preserved county: Clwyd
- Country: Wales
- Sovereign state: United Kingdom
- Post town: Holywell
- Postcode district: CH8
- Dialling code: 01352
- Police: North Wales
- Fire: North Wales
- Ambulance: Welsh
- UK Parliament: Clwyd East
- Senedd Cymru – Welsh Parliament: Delyn

Calcoed is a small village in Flintshire, Wales. It is located to the south west of the town of Holywell, to the north west of the village of Brynford and near the A55 road (North Wales Expressway). It contains the Cynfaen Memorial Methodist Chapel and several houses.
