= Rhes-y-cae =

Coordinates: 53.227°N 3.217°W

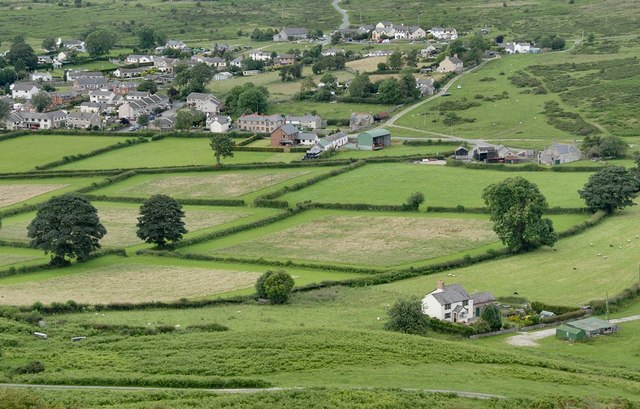
- Rhes-y-cae

- Location within Flintshire
- OS grid reference: SJ187708
- Principal area: Flintshire
- Preserved county: Clwyd
- Country: Wales
- Sovereign state: United Kingdom
- Post town: HOLYWELL
- Postcode district: CH8
- Dialling code: 01352
- Police: North Wales
- Fire: North Wales
- Ambulance: Welsh
- UK Parliament: Clwyd East
- Senedd Cymru – Welsh Parliament: Delyn

Rhes-y-cae is a small parish and village in Flintshire, Wales. Literally translated from Welsh, Rhes-y-cae is 'Row of fields'. It is situated between Pentre Halkyn and Rhosesmor and is part of the local government community of Halkyn. Local facilities include a chapel, a church and a park, which is situated next to Ysgol Rhes-y-cae. The school closed in 2013, due to there being too few students to warrant its continued operation.

The parish church was consecrated on 27 June 1847.

The village shop has shut down, the bakery has closed to the public, and Rhes-y-cae pub, The Miners Arms, closed in 2014.

Every summer the Rhes-y-cae Show takes place, featuring dog racing and show jumping. Around 600 people attend each year.

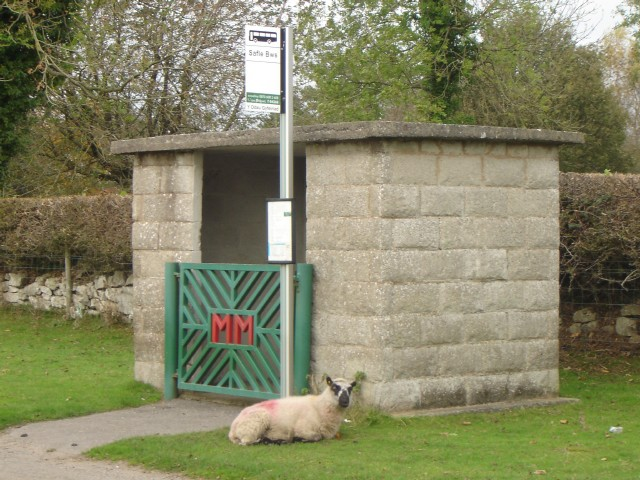
Bus shelter and sheep, Rhes-y-cae.
