= Brynford =

Village and community in Flintshire, Wales

Brynford: Welsh: Brynffordd
- Village and community
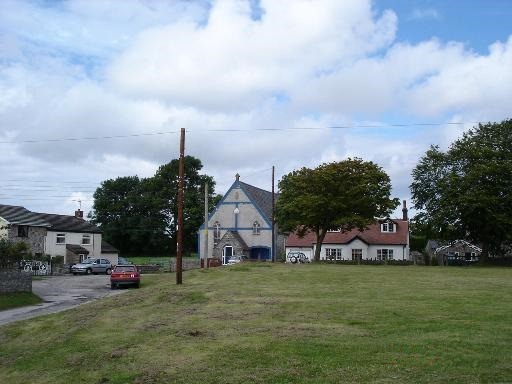
- Brynford village green

- Location within Flintshire
- Population: 1,059 (2021)
- OS grid reference: SJ180744
- Community: Brynford
- Principal area: Flintshire
- Preserved county: Clwyd
- Country: Wales
- Sovereign state: United Kingdom
- Settlements: Brynford, Calcoed, Dolphin
- Post town: HOLYWELL
- Postcode district: CH8
- Dialling code: 01352
- Police: North Wales
- Fire: North Wales
- Ambulance: Welsh
- UK Parliament: Clwyd East
- Senedd Cymru – Welsh Parliament: Delyn
- Website: Council website
- List of places UK Wales Flintshire 53.26082°N 3.23052°W Map of the community

Brynford (Welsh: Brynffordd) is a village and community in Flintshire, Wales. It is located to the south west of the town of Holywell and near the A55 road (North Wales Expressway). Brynford had a population of 1,059 at the 2011 census.

St Michael's Church (Church in Wales) dates from 1851 and is a Grade II listed building. The Cynfaen Memorial Methodist Chapel, serving Brynford, is in the nearby village of Calcoed. Two Bronze Age round barrows known as Clwt Militia (Militia Patch) are located on Holywell Golf Club, about 0.65 miles (1 km) north-northwest of the church.

Historically, the area was extensively mined for lead and has been left with the scars of that past all over its common land.

The explorer and journalist Henry Morton Stanley was a student teacher in the old village school.

The community includes the villages of Calcoed and Dolphin.

== Governance ==
The Brynford community was created (as a civil parish) in 1897. It elects ten councillors, and is not divided into wards.

The council is part of Brynford and Halkyn electoral ward on Flintshire County Council, which elects two councillors to that body. Before 2022, there were separate electoral wards for Brynford and Halkyn.

It is part of the Delyn constituency and North Wales region for the Senedd, and of the Clwyd East constituency for Parliament.
