= Cilcain =

Village and community in Flintshire, Wales

- Village and community
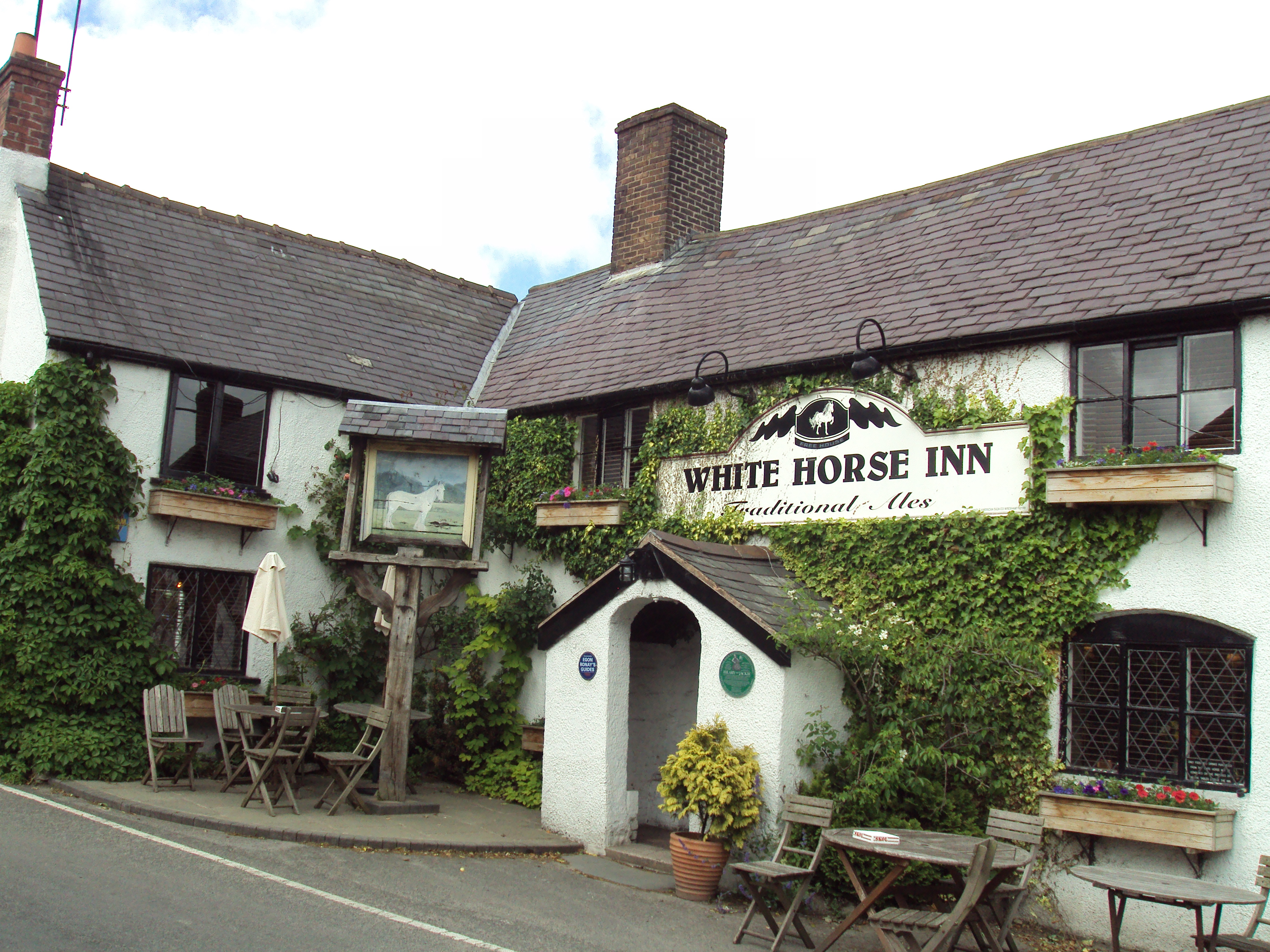
- The White Horse Inn, in the Village Centre

- Location within Flintshire
- Population: 1,340 (2021)
- OS grid reference: SJ1765
- Community: Cilcain
- Principal area: Flintshire
- Preserved county: Clwyd
- Country: Wales
- Sovereign state: United Kingdom
- Settlements: Cilcain, Rhydymwyn
- Post town: MOLD
- Postcode district: CH7
- Dialling code: 01352
- Police: North Wales
- Fire: North Wales
- Ambulance: Welsh
- UK Parliament: Clwyd East
- Senedd Cymru – Welsh Parliament: Delyn
- Website: Council website
- List of places UK Wales Flintshire 53.1667°N 3.2333°W Map of the community

Cilcain is a village and community, near Mold, in Flintshire, north-east Wales. The village has an industrial history and includes the Millennium Woods, a post office, a public house, a parish church, a primary school (Ysgol y Foel) and a village hall.

Cilcain borders the parishes of Rhosesmor, Rhes-y-cae and Rhydymwyn. The community includes the village of Rhydymwyn.

Cilcain has an annual Cilcain show at the village hall. There are usually fairs and a dog show. Also a junior and adults race either up Moel Famau or just up a part of the mountain.

== Name ==
The Welsh placename Cilcain, which has also in the past been spelled as Kilken and Cilcen, and may derive from cil meaning 'retreat' and cain meaning 'fair' or 'pleasant' in the Welsh language.

== Early Cilcain ==
In the early years of Cilcain's existence it was noted as a place of retreat and was also locally known for its regular village fairs and for cockfighting, which took place on Sundays after the local church service.

== Church ==
The first recorded mention of the church at Cilcain dates from 1291. Cilcain is one of the "ancient parishes" of Flintshire. It originally comprised the seven townships of Cefn, Llan (or Tre'r Llan), Llystynhunydd (or Glust), Llys y Coed, Maes y Groes, Mechlas (or Dolfechlas), and Trellyniau. On 27 June 1848, the township of Trellyniau and part of the township of Llystynhunydd went to the new parish of Rhes-y-Cae. On 31 March 1865, the remainder of Llystynhunydd, and parts of the townships of Cefn and Mechlas, went to the new parish of Rhydymwyn.

== Governance ==
Cilcain Community Council is divided into two wards, Cilcain and Rhydymwyn, each of which elects six councillors. The Cilcain and Nannerch communities make up the Cilcain electoral ward on Flintshire County Council, which elects one councillor. It had a population of 1,790 at the 2021 census. Cilcain is part of the Delyn constituency and North Wales region for the Senedd, and of the Clwyd East constituency for parliament.

== Millennium Woods ==
The Millennium Woods were planted in 2000 through the 'Woods on your doorstep' scheme of the Woodland Trust. Many of the trees were planted by students attending the local school, Ysgol y Foel. The official name is Coed y Felin ('Mill Woods'), named after the disused mill that now lies in ruins by the stream below.

== See also ==
- Cilcain Hall
- Brynle Williams (1949–2011), Cilcain farmer and Conservative member of the National Assembly for Wales.
