= New Brighton, Flintshire =

Village in Flintshire, Wales

Coordinates: 53.180°N 3.118°W

New Brighton: Welsh: Pentre Cythrel
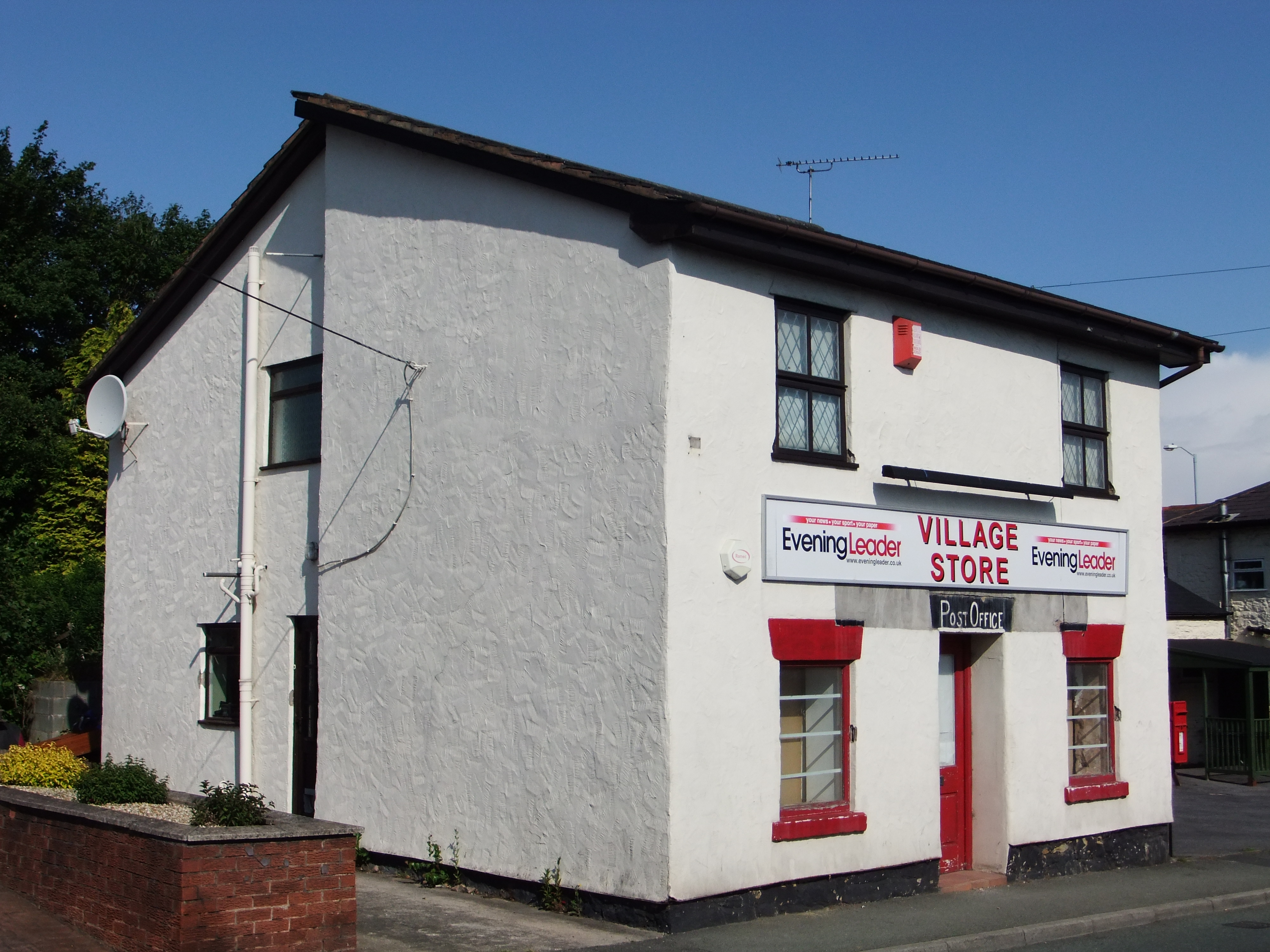
- Village store on Bryn Lane

- Location within Flintshire
- OS grid reference: SJ252653
- Community: Argoed
- Principal area: Flintshire
- Preserved county: Clwyd
- Country: Wales
- Sovereign state: United Kingdom
- Post town: MOLD
- Postcode district: CH7
- Dialling code: 01352
- Police: North Wales
- Fire: North Wales
- Ambulance: Welsh
- UK Parliament: Clwyd East
- Senedd Cymru – Welsh Parliament: Delyn

New Brighton (Welsh: Pentre Cythraul, officially Pentre Cythrel) is a small village in Flintshire, in north-east Wales. It lies between the towns of Mold and Buckley, in the community of Argoed.

== Description ==
New Brighton lies on the A5119 road and has a hotel, the Beaufort Park Hotel.

The New Brighton electoral ward consists of the northern half of the Argoed community, with a total population taken at the 2011 census of 3,001, and forms part of an "Argoed and New Brighton" (Welsh: Argoed a New Brighton) council ward.

== Name ==
Very few names are recorded for this part of Argoed before the mid-nineteenth century, with a farm (south-west of the modern village) recorded as Tre Argoed in the sixteenth century and a map of 1840 showing a local tavern named "Blue Bell". The name New Brighton does not appear until 1861, following the construction of a row of miners cottages by the owner of the Argoed Colliery, Josiah Catherall. It has been suggested that the name New Brighton may have arisen as many of the workers came to Flintshire from New Brighton, Merseyside but this has been disputed in recent years.

The local Welsh name, Pentre Cythraul has been translated as "Devil's village" or "Devil's hamlet". While the change from "Catherall" to "Cythraul" (a Welsh name for the devil) may seem like a "mischievous variation" or colloquialism on the Catherall family name, and Welsh authors recorded this as the derivation as early as 1902, there is no record of the village under the name Pentre Catherall.

In 1913 the name was recorded under another variation, Bentre'r Gwr Drwg With Gwr Drwg (lit. 'evil man') used in place of Cythraul by Welsh speakers who did not wish to evoke the name. However, the form Pentre Cythraul persisted into the twentieth century when Ellis Davies described it as "the old name" for New Brighton.

By 2018, the Welsh name did not appear on the list of standardised Welsh place-names published by the Welsh Language Commissioner, Aled Roberts. The place-name panel stated that they had recommended using "New Brighton" in English and Welsh because "as the district became more anglicised and the coal-mining links disappeared, the forms Pentre Catherall and Pentre Cythrel were largely forgotten".

As a result of the name being not officially recognised, it would not be added to road signs or appear on Ordnance Survey maps but is accepted by organisations such as the Royal Mail and DVLA. The decision resulted in a locally launched bid to get the Welsh name officially recognised. In 2019, the commissioner's office stated that they were "reviewing its decision" following a number of enquiries, including following a bid by locals, in the same year, for the Welsh name to be recognised.

In October 2024, the commissioner proposed Pentre Cythrel as an alternative Welsh name to be formally recognised. The proposal would be presented to Flintshire councillors on a committee for approval on 10 October. The alternative Welsh name had been proposed over concerns of the "negative connotations" Pentre Cythraul may have, due to its translation as 'devil's village'. The commissioner now supports the use of an official Welsh name for the village, but suggested Pentre Cythrel, to be representative of the oral development of the name 'Catherall' and represent the local pronunciation. The commissioner stated that to use Cythraul would be a "further step away" from the colloquially given local name. A councillor also claimed that locals who had used Pentre Cythraul are supportive of the alternative proposed, and that recognising a Welsh name would support the council's promotion of Welsh, by making the language more visible and treating it equal to English.

In November 2024, the new Welsh name Pentre Cythrel was officially recognised following a vote of approval from Flintshire council.
