= Mynydd Isa =

Village in Flintshire, Wales

Coordinates: 53.17°N 3.12°W

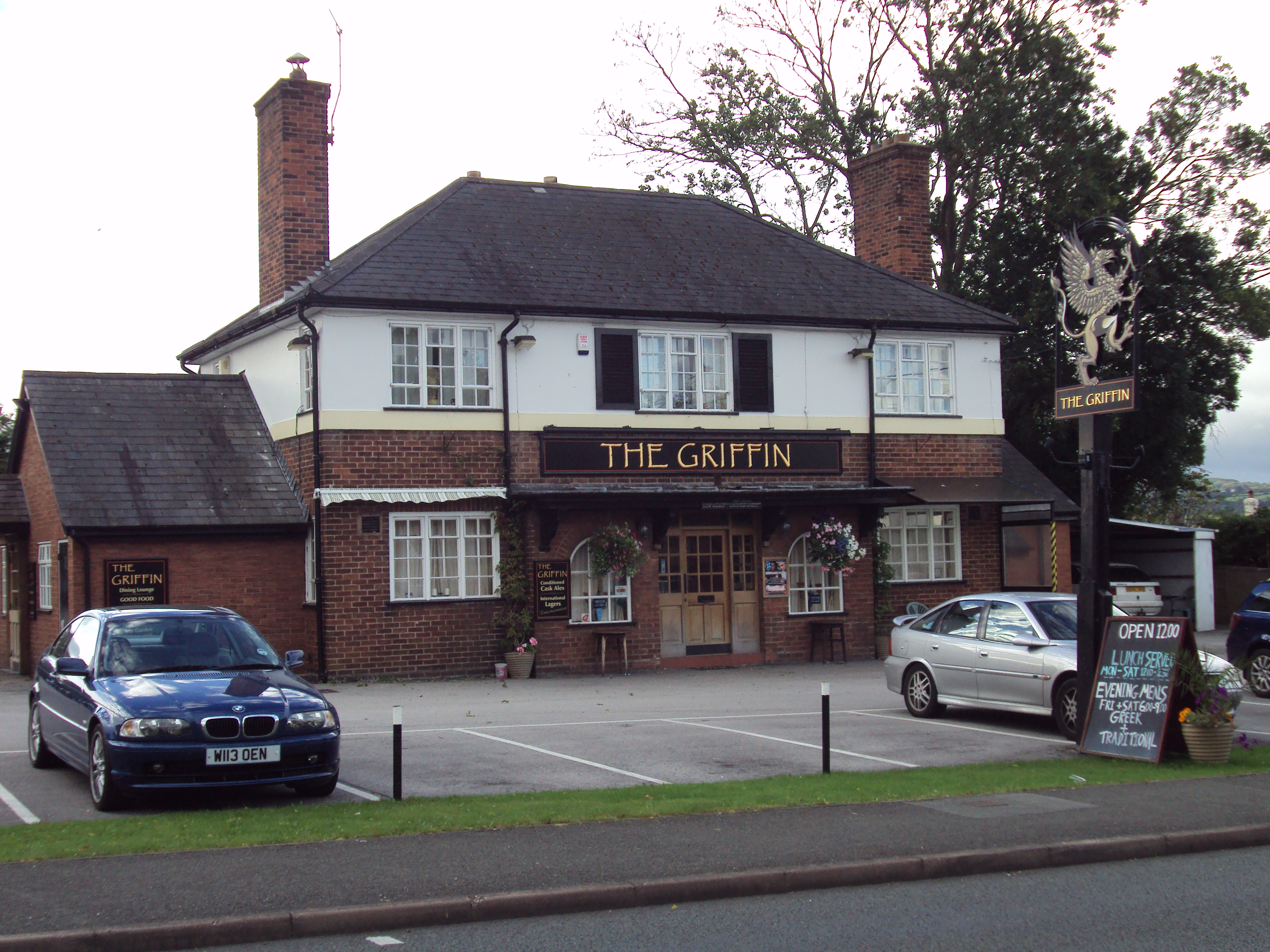
- The Griffin public house, Mynydd Isa

- Location within Flintshire
- OS grid reference: SJ2564
- Community: Argoed
- Principal area: Flintshire
- Preserved county: Clwyd
- Country: Wales
- Sovereign state: United Kingdom
- Post town: MOLD
- Postcode district: CH7
- Dialling code: +44-1352 / +44-1244
- Police: North Wales
- Fire: North Wales
- Ambulance: Welsh
- UK Parliament: Clwyd East
- Senedd Cymru – Welsh Parliament: Delyn

Mynydd Isa ([ˌmənɨ̞ð ˈɪsa]; Welsh: Mynyddisa) is a village in Flintshire, in north-east Wales. It lies between the county town of Mold, and Buckley (which it is contiguous with) in the community of Argoed which had a population of 5,627 according to the 2021 census. Mynydd Isa was originally a small hamlet on the north side of the Mold to Buckley road (now the A549 road) just downhill from the now demolished Calvinist chapel. It did not appear on Ordnance Survey maps until 1912.

Its placename is Welsh for "lowest mountain".

Another old hamlet nearby was Pant-y-Fownog, on the same road nearer Buckley (centred on the Griffin Inn); although the name was used well into the 1900s on picture postcards of the area and by the local Co-Op shop next to the Inn. The name has long since become disused (except for lending its name to a road in nearby Buckley).

Bryn-y-Baal [ˌbrɨ̞nəˈbɑːl] is an old hamlet much enlarged since the 1970s and now contiguous with but not part of Mynydd Isa. Bryn-y-Baal takes its name from a Middle English word "bale" (rhymes with "Carl" in arhotic British English) meaning small hill and Bryn (Welsh for hill), i.e. hill hill. It was later written in a Welsh language form as 'bâl' with a circumflex over the "â". In Welsh this is pronounced as a long A. This form appears on early Ordnance Survey maps. Eventually it was written in the Anglicised form 'Baal' – still correctly pronounced to rhyme with "Carl".

In the area there is a secondary school known as Argoed High School in Bryn-y-Baal and a primary school Ysgol Mynydd Isa – the Junior department being in Bryn-y-Baal (formerly Ysgol y Bryn and before that Mynydd Isa Junior School), and the Infants department (formerly known as Wat's Dyke Infant School) on a separate site in Mynydd Isa.

The local community council is Argoed Community Council (Cyngor Cymunedol Argoed) – Argoed being the name of the ancient township which had covered the area since the Middle Ages, which also gives its name to the local secondary school.

Amenities include a pub, The Griffin on Mold Road (The Mercia on Mercia Drive closed in 2010, and is now a supermarket), various shops and the village centre which houses a cafe 'Caffi Isa', a community interest group located in the old library and other clubs and associations. In the same area there is a Sainsbury's Local, a Fish Bar, a dance school and more.

The village has a large youth organisation (established in 1984) with football teams representing the village in the county league from 7 to 16 years old and adult football dating back to the 1930s; however the adult team disbanded in 2009.
