= Oakenholt =

Village in Flintshire, Wales

Coordinates: 53.23°N 03.11°W

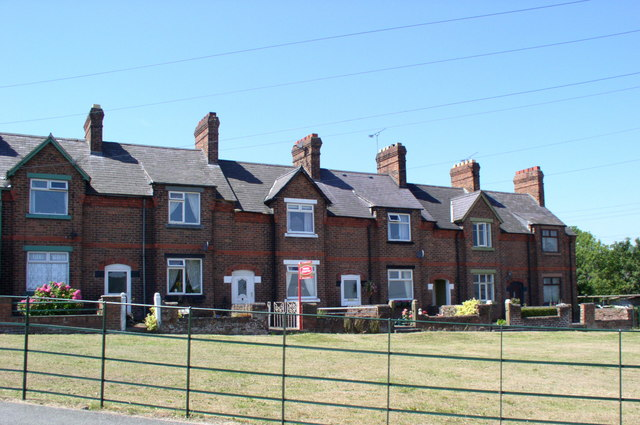
- Victorian terrace, Oakenholt

- Location within Flintshire
- Population: 2,920 (2001 Census)
- OS grid reference: SJ2671
- Community: Flint
- Principal area: Flintshire
- Preserved county: Clwyd
- Country: Wales
- Sovereign state: United Kingdom
- Post town: FLINT
- Postcode district: CH6
- Dialling code: 01352
- Police: North Wales
- Fire: North Wales
- Ambulance: Welsh
- UK Parliament: Alyn and Deeside
- Senedd Cymru – Welsh Parliament: Delyn

Oakenholt is a village in Flintshire, Wales. It is situated to the south east of the town of Flint, near the A548 road. At the 2001 Census, the population of the Flint Oakenholt Ward was 2920.

In 2017 an archaeological excavation took place in the village to find evidence of any settlement during the Roman occupation of Britain. Previous digs in the area uncovered remains of Roman roads, buildings, furnaces and coins.
