= Pentre Halkyn =

Village in Flintshire, Wales

Coordinates: 53.242°N 3.198°W

Pentre Halkyn: Welsh: Pentre Helygain
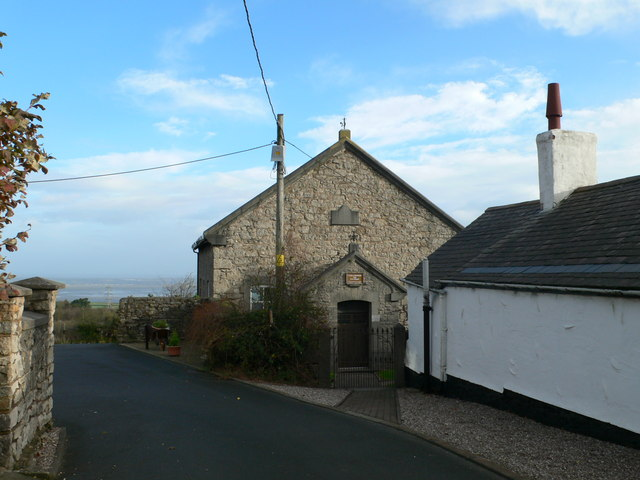
- Salem, Pentre Halkyn

- Location within Flintshire
- OS grid reference: SJ200723
- Community: Halkyn
- Principal area: Flintshire
- Preserved county: Clwyd
- Country: Wales
- Sovereign state: United Kingdom
- Post town: HOLYWELL
- Postcode district: CH8
- Dialling code: 01352
- Police: North Wales
- Fire: North Wales
- Ambulance: Welsh
- UK Parliament: Clwyd East
- Senedd Cymru – Welsh Parliament: Delyn

Pentre Halkyn (Welsh: Pentre Helygain) is a small village in Flintshire, Wales. It is situated approximately two miles from Holywell, and is off Junction 32 of the A55 North Wales Expressway. It has a quarry, a small hotel, and a local shop. The village borders on the Halkyn Mountain Site of Special Scientific Interest and Special Area of Conservation.

== Village ==
Pentre Halkyn is small hillside village, with a population of approximately 1,100. The village features a shop, a cafe, a Football Club Halkyn United F.C., Halkyn Cricket Club and a play area. It has one main road running through the middle that comes off the A55 and leads down to the town of Holywell. It also has a hotel close to the A55 called the Springfield Hotel and Health Club. The village sits on the side of a steep incline and has views of North East Wales and Merseyside, and on a clear day even Blackpool Tower can be seen.

== Mining and quarrying ==
Lead ore was first mined in Roman times and was then smelted at Flint. The lead that was produced there was stamped with the inscription Deceangli (Welsh: Tegeingl), which was the name of the Celtic British Iron Age tribe occupying the area.

In the 17th century an intensive period of lead mining begun, drawing the interest and the investment of the London Lead Company and various Derbyshire mining entrepreneurs. Shortly after, new rich veins were discovered and these were quickly exploited, bringing a large number of skilled miners especially from Derbyshire to live in Halkyn. A road, Buxton Lane, is named after the Derbyshire town. The lane leads to the Billins mine, which is immediately to the south of the Pentre Halkyn to Babell Road.

The existing villages of Pentre Halkyn, Halkyn and Rhosesmor grew rapidly in these times as more miners came to the area. New communities were developed as the villages grew, to house the newcomers. This resulted in the development of the villages and hamlets of Rhes-y-Cae, Moel-y-Crio, Wern-y-Gaer, Berthddu, Pant-y-go and Windmill. By the 19th century the lead mines were well developed and concerns arose necessitating mining techniques. This raised the problem of flooding due to the digging of deep drainage tunnels, with the most important being the Milwr tunnel that leads from Loggerheads to Bagillt.

Mining ended in the 1970s but quarrying is still an important local industry with two new large limestone quarries dominating the surrounding area. As a result of these quarries opening, new institutions were needed to support the community with new churches, chapels, a school and village halls being opened in the 19th century.

== Trig point ==
The trig point at the pinnacle of Halkyn Mountain is 290 metres above sea level. On a clear day it is possible to see Blackpool Tower in Lancashire, about 50 miles away.

== Notable people ==
- Ann Clwyd – late Cynon Valley MP
