= Sealand, Flintshire =

Village in Flintshire, Wales

Sealand
- Community
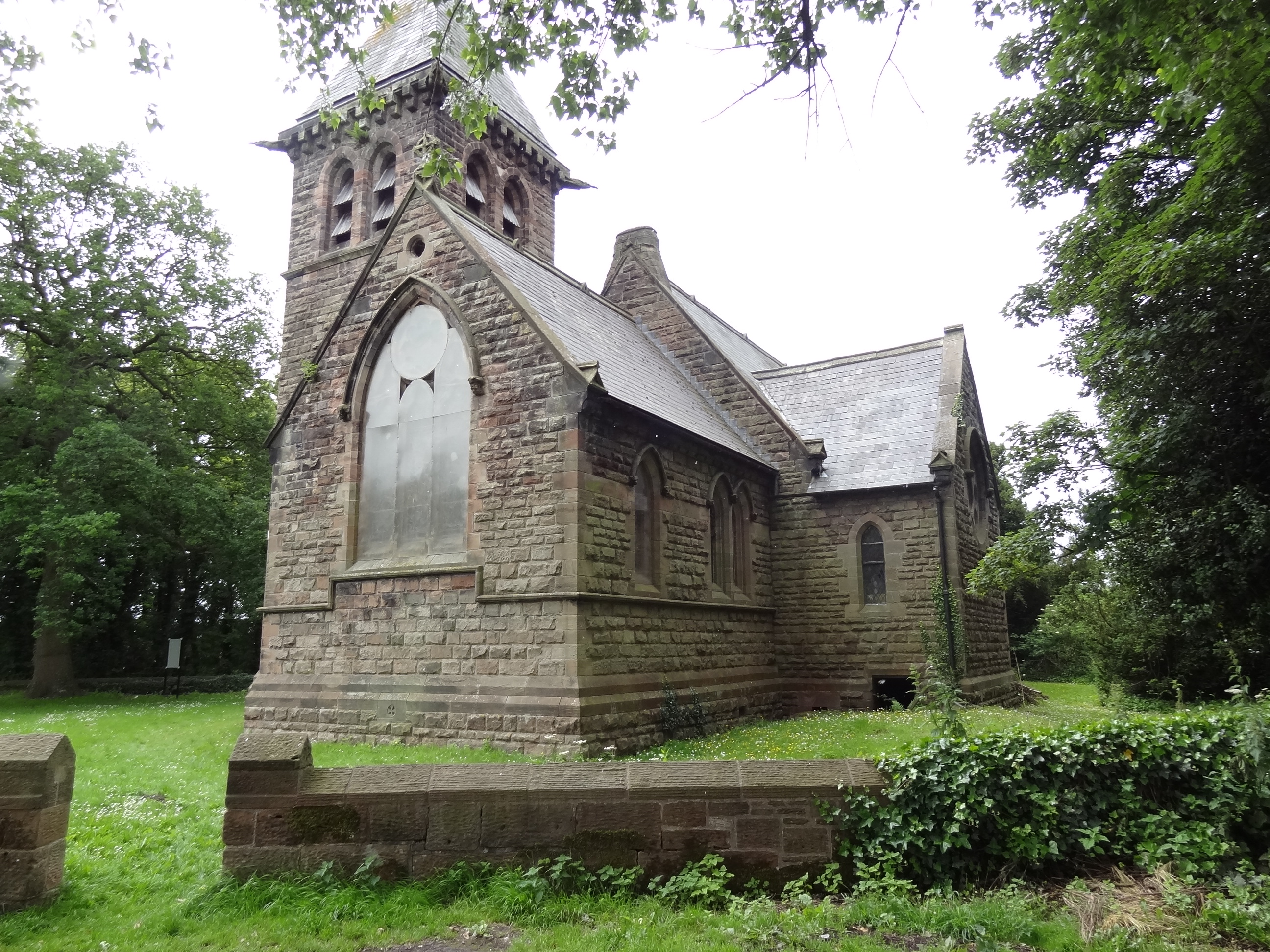
- St. Bartholomew's Church, Sealand

- Location within Flintshire
- Population: 2,996 (2011 Census)
- OS grid reference: SJ352688
- Community: Sealand
- Principal area: Flintshire
- Preserved county: Clwyd
- Country: Wales
- Sovereign state: United Kingdom
- Post town: CHESTER
- Postcode district: CH1
- Post town: DEESIDE
- Postcode district: CH5
- Dialling code: 01244
- Police: North Wales
- Fire: North Wales
- Ambulance: Welsh
- UK Parliament: Alyn and Deeside
- Senedd Cymru – Welsh Parliament: Alyn and Deeside
- Website: Council website
- List of places UK Wales Flintshire 53.212°N 2.970°W Map of the community

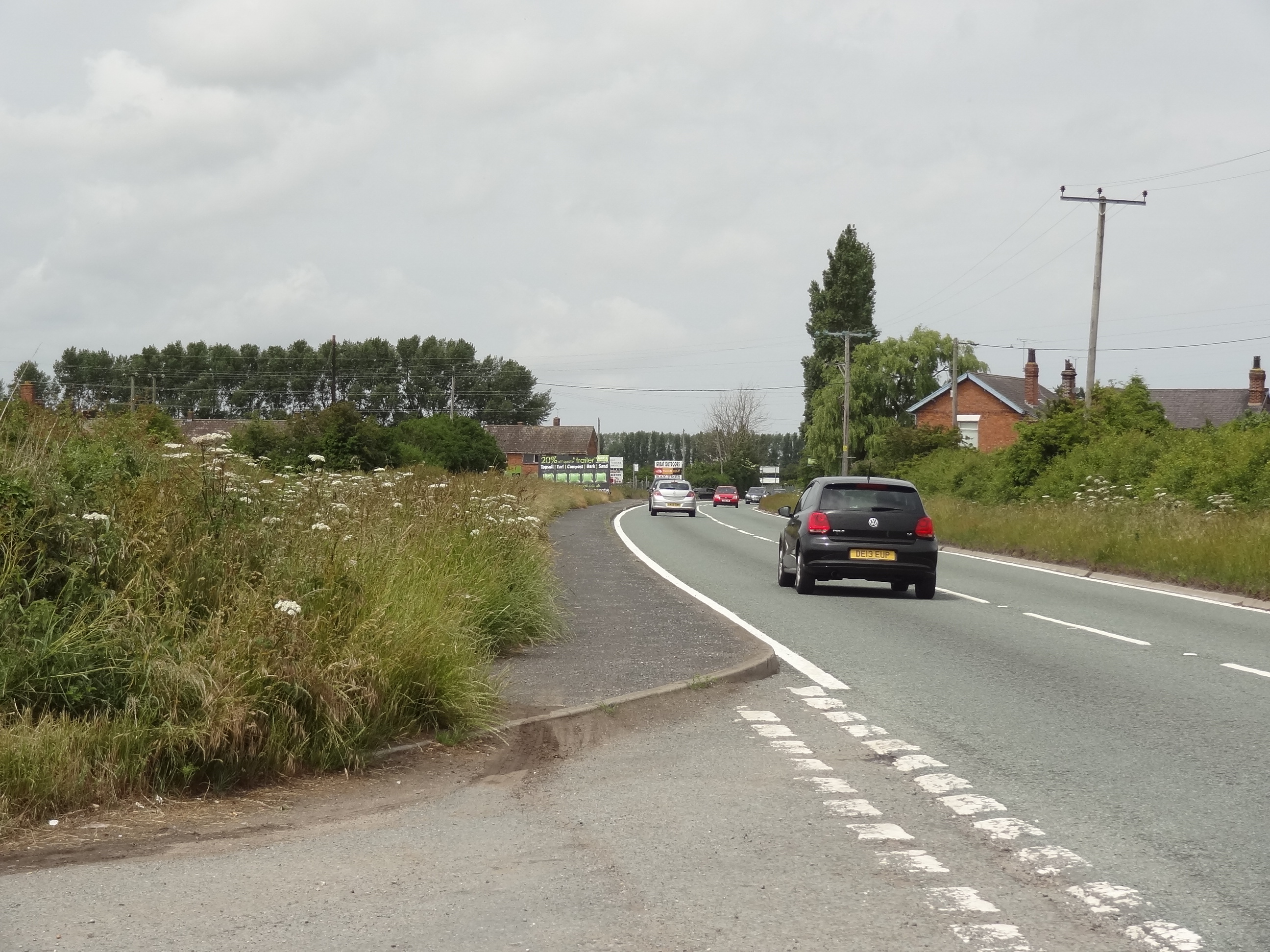
A view in Sealand, Flintshire, Wales. Fertile market gardening land. In 1700 it was tidal sand and mud flat.

Sealand is a village and community in Flintshire, north-east Wales, on the edge of the Wirral peninsula. It is west of the city of Chester, England, and is part of the Deeside conurbation on the Wales-England border. At the 2001 Census, it had a population of 2,746 (1,342 males, 1,404 females), increasing to 2,996 at the 2011 census. The community includes the villages of Garden City and Sealand, and the settlements of Higher Ferry, Sealand Manor and Sealand Road.

Sealand Manor was established by the Welsh Land Settlement Society in 1937 as an agricultural settlement. The local Society was wound up in 1961, after which the leases of the homes passed to Hawarden Rural District Council.

Sealand is on flat land formed by land reclamation of part of the head of the estuary of the River Dee which had become heavily silted-up. It is on the A548 road, near the Chester dormitory communities of Blacon and Saughall and is a popular place of residence for people from both sides of the Welsh/English border. Welsh-medium primary education is available three miles away at Ysgol Croes Atti's Shotton site (opened in 2014) whilst Welsh-medium secondary education is available nine miles away in Mold at the long established Ysgol Maes Garmon.

The River Dee flowed to the sea along the current border between Wales and England, until in the 18th century it was diverted into its present channelized course to try to improve ship access from the sea to Chester. That led to extensive land reclamation in the head of the Dee estuary. The River Dee Company (1741-1902) had a right to reclaim the marshes and build embankments following the re-alignment of the Dee.

== Timeline ==
- 1732: Nathaniel Kinderley proposed the scheme.
- 1735-1736: Nathaniel Kinderley & Company cut the new Dee channel from Chester to Golftyn.
- 1737: The new Dee channel was opened for shipping.
- 1740: Kinderley's company became known as the River Dee Company.
- 1753: First polder made: (the land where now are the) Shooting School, Sealand Manor, Garden City, about as far as Hawarden Bridge.
- 1754: Polder made: Ferry Lane Industrial Estate, Thornleigh Park, Sealand Nursery, Deeside House.
- 1768: Polder made: Bank Farm, Birchenfields Farm.
- 1790: Polder made: Yewtree Farm, Church Farm, Sealand village, Waterloo Farm, Willow Farm.
- 1826: Polder made: Old Marsh Farm, rest of low land east of where the A550 road is now.
- 1857: Polder made: where the Deeside Industrial Park is now. (In the 20th century this area was raised 2.5 meters / 8 feet by sand pumping.)
- 1861: The thousands of acres of reclaimed marshlands around Sealand and Saltney were raising £8000 in annual rent.
- 1865-1867: St Bartholomew's Church, Sealand was built.
- About 1880: West of the Dee, a polder including Beeches Farm (a little north of Hawarden Airport) was made.
- 1892: Polder made: the Shotton steelworks.

Boundaries of these polders show as old dikes across the farmland.

== Airfield ==
RAF Sealand was originally a civilian airfield and was taken over by the military in 1916 for training. No. 30 Maintenance unit was formed there in 1939. In 1951 the station was taken over by the United States Air Force, and then handed back to the RAF in 1957.

As a result of defence cuts announced in 2004, RAF Sealand was closed in April 2006. There is a housing estate on the land and a planned Industrial estate.

== In popular culture ==
Though not about the community, the 1981 song "Sealand" by Wirral band Orchestral Manoeuvres in the Dark took its title from the RAF base there. For songwriter Andy McCluskey, the name seemed to evoke the image of "a place between the land and the sea".

== See also ==
- St Bartholomew's Church, Sealand
