= Nannerch =

Village and community in Flintshire, Wales

- Village and community
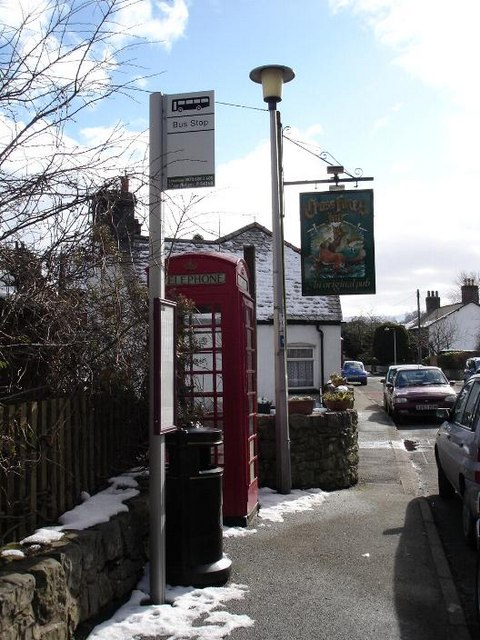
- Main road through the village

- Location within Flintshire
- Population: 443 (2021)
- OS grid reference: SJ166695
- Community: Nannerch
- Principal area: Flintshire
- Preserved county: Clwyd
- Country: Wales
- Sovereign state: United Kingdom
- Post town: MOLD
- Postcode district: CH7
- Dialling code: 01352
- Police: North Wales
- Fire: North Wales
- Ambulance: Welsh
- UK Parliament: Clwyd East
- Senedd Cymru – Welsh Parliament: Delyn
- Website: nannerch.com
- List of places UK Wales Flintshire 53.216°N 3.25°W Map of the community

Nannerch is a village and community in Flintshire, Wales, located within the Clwydian Range and Dee Valley Area of Outstanding Natural Beauty. At the 2001 Census the population of Nannerch was 531, reducing to 496 in 2011.

== History ==
Nannerch (pronounced Nan-er-ch in Welsh) is one of the ancient parishes of Flintshire, made up of the townships of Trellan, Trefechan, Trecwm and Tre Penbedw.

It is an ancient village, sitting on bedrock of Carboniferous Limestone, overlain by glacial boulder clay with glacial hollows. The limestone has been used in the construction of many local buildings. The ruins of Iron Age hill forts at Pen-y-Cloddiau and Moel Arthur are situated in the nearby hills.

== Governance ==
Nannerch Community Council consists of 8 councillors, and is not divided into wards. The Cilcain and Nannerch communities make up the Cilcain electoral ward on Flintshire County Council, which elects one councillor. Nannerch is part of the Delyn constituency and North Wales region for the Senedd, and the Clwyd East constituency for Parliament.

== Transport ==
The main A541 Mold - Denbigh road bypasses the village.

The Mold and Denbigh Junction Railway, which opened in 1869, passed through the village. Nannerch railway station was closed in 1962. and demolished shortly afterwards.

== See also ==
- 1 and 2 Tai Cochion
