= Halkyn =

Village and community in Flintshire, Wales

Halkyn: Welsh: Helygain
- Village and community
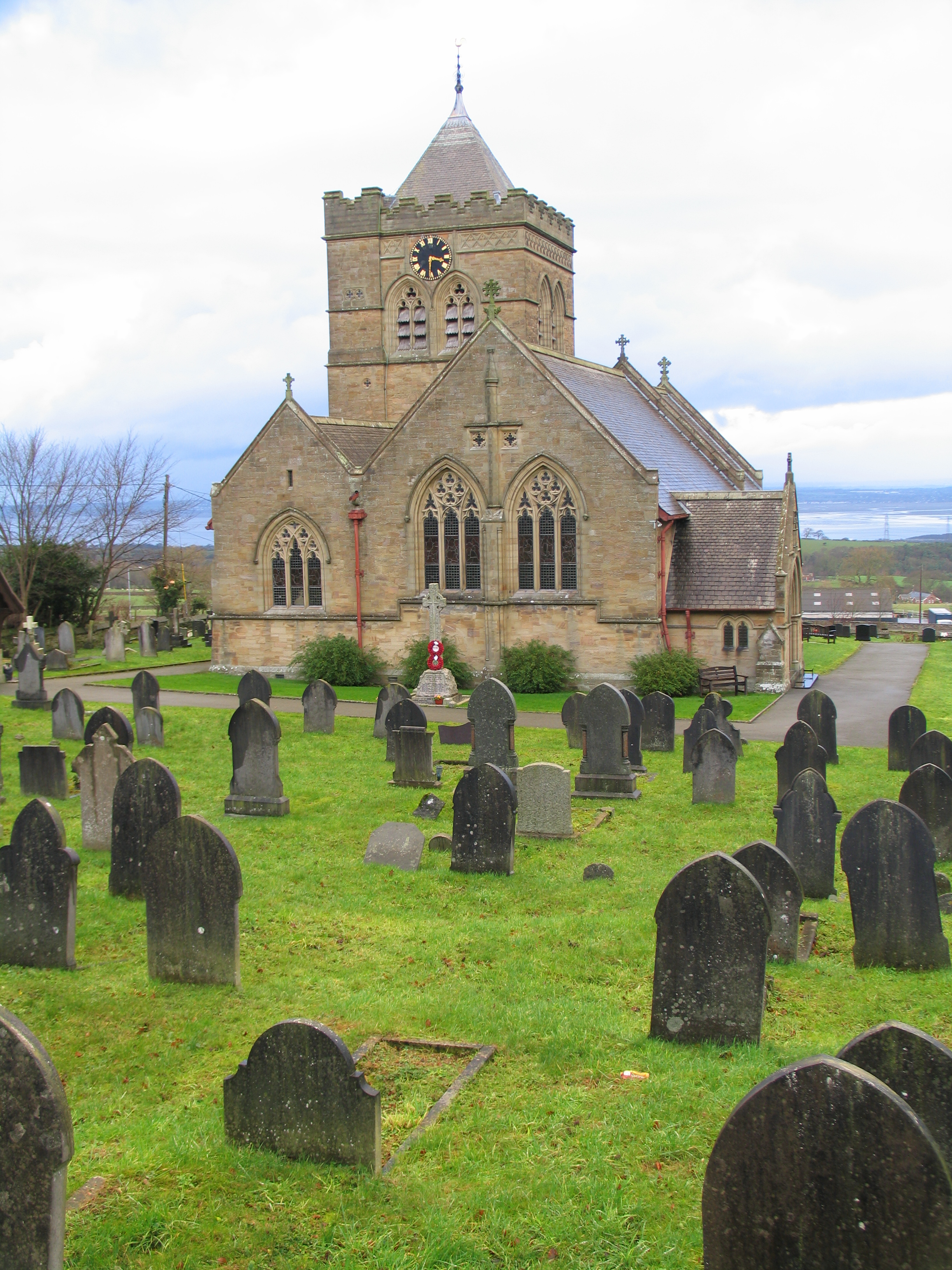
- Church of St Mary the Virgin, Halkyn, from the west

- Location within Flintshire
- Population: 2,879 (2011 Census)
- OS grid reference: SJ211714
- Community: Halkyn
- Principal area: Flintshire
- Preserved county: Clwyd
- Country: Wales
- Sovereign state: United Kingdom
- Post town: MOLD
- Postcode district: CH7
- Post town: HOLYWELL
- Postcode district: CH8
- Dialling code: 01352
- Police: North Wales
- Fire: North Wales
- Ambulance: Welsh
- UK Parliament: Clwyd East
- Senedd Cymru – Welsh Parliament: Delyn
- Website: halkyn.org.uk
- List of places UK Wales Flintshire 53.233°N 3.183°W Map of the community

Halkyn (Welsh: Helygain [heˈləgain]; locally: Lygian [ˈləgjan]) is a village and community in Flintshire, north-east Wales and situated between Pentre Halkyn, Northop and Rhosesmor. At the 2001 Census the population of the community was 2,876, increasing slightly to 2,879 at the 2011 Census. Pentre Halkyn is in the community.

== History ==
Halkyn is one of the ancient parishes of Flintshire, originally comprising the townships of Hendrefigillt, Lygan y Llan and Lygan y Wern. The area was notable during the Roman occupation for the mining of lead. The village was recorded in the Domesday Book of 1086 as Alchene, when it was then part of Cheshire, in England.

== Governance ==
An electoral ward in the same name exists. The population of this ward at the 2011 Census was 1,785. The Halkyn ward includes the villages of Halkyn, Rhes-y-cae and Rhosesmor and elects one county councillor to Flintshire County Council.

== Amenities ==
The village has a football club Halkyn United F.C., a cricket club, a post office (run as part of the Blue Bell Inn), a parish church, a library, and two public houses, the Britannia and the award-winning Blue Bell Inn.

== Notable people ==
- Dan Jones, translator of the Book of Mormon into Welsh.
