= Rhosesmor =

Village in Flintshire, Wales

Coordinates: 53.207°N 3.178°W

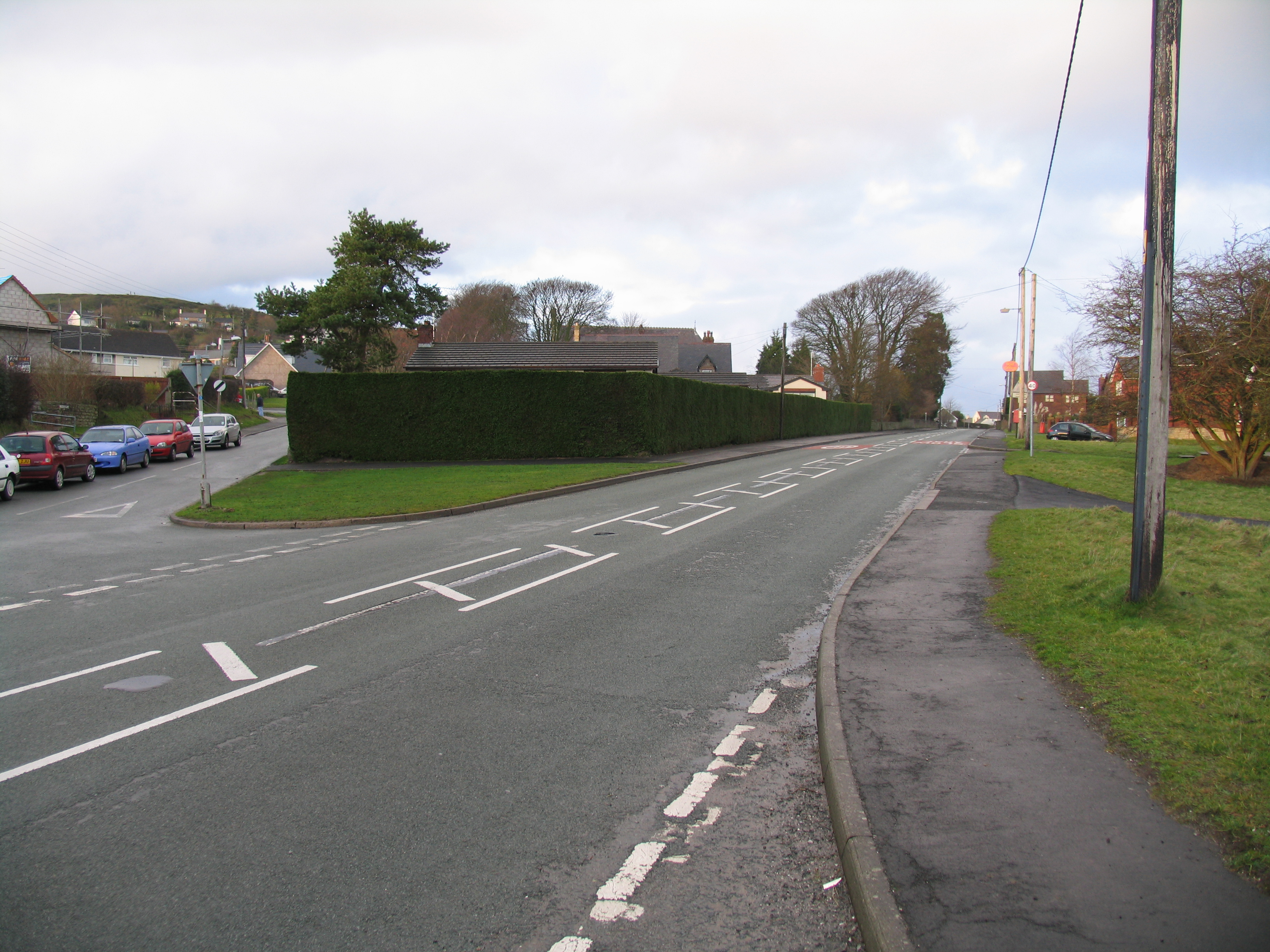
- Rhosesmor's main road

- Location within Flintshire
- OS grid reference: SJ213684
- Community: Halkyn
- Principal area: Flintshire
- Preserved county: Clwyd
- Country: Wales
- Sovereign state: United Kingdom
- Post town: MOLD
- Postcode district: CH7
- Dialling code: 01352
- Police: North Wales
- Fire: North Wales
- Ambulance: Welsh
- UK Parliament: Clwyd East
- Senedd Cymru – Welsh Parliament: Delyn

Rhosesmor is a small village near Mold, Flintshire, in north-east Wales. The village lies near the parishes of Halkyn and Rhes-y-cae. The hamlet of Wern-y-Gaer is encompassed by the boundaries of the village.

The hill fort site affords views across the Clwydian Hills to the west and the whole sweep of Wirral to the Sefton coastline and Liverpool and further east.

== History ==
The new parish of Caerfallwch (the traditional Welsh placename for the village) was created on 23 October 1876, from part of the township of Caerfallwch, which until that time had been in the parish of Northop.

The London Gazette of the 27 October 1876 defined the boundaries of the new parish:

"All that part of the parish of Northop in the county of Flint and in the diocese of Saint Asaph which is comprised within and is co-extensive with the limits of that portion of the township of Caerfallwch wherein the present incumbent of the said parish of Northop now possesses the exclusive cure of souls, or in other words, which consists of that portion of the said township of Caerfallwch which is not included within the limits of the consolidated chapelry of Saint John, Rhydymwyn, in the county and diocese aforesaid."

The Handy Guide to Mold and the Neighbourhood; Tweddel, 1890 records:

"This quiet little village, on the confines of Halkyn mountain, forms a remarkably pleasant excursion from Mold, from which it is about four miles distant. ... The highway branches off to the right, along a narrow lane that will prove attractive to the botanist, and the lover of wild flowers, for here nature displays her varied chorus, according to the season of the year, primroses, hyacinths, cowslips, wild roses, honeysuckle, ferns, foxgloves, and innumerable other wayside flowers gladden the sight, and give the air the redolence of their perfume."

A significant part of the village is now included in the designated Site of Special Scientific Interest (SSSI). The village is rich with flora, fauna and ancient hedgerows. Sheep roam freely on the mountain and often decide to sit in the middle of the road.

The village has a lead mining history and several of the buildings, particularly in the Wern-y-Gaer area of the modern village are more than three hundred years old. The Celtic hill fort of Moel-y-Gaer, which dates to pre-Roman times, is above the village.

== Geography ==
There are extensive natural and man-made tunnels, caves and caverns under the village. This is because it has been a mining centre from pre-Roman times, as well as having an interesting subterranean structure. These features are documented in various books by Cris Ebbs and have been explored by the Grosvenor Caving Club. There is also an underground lake under Rhosesmor, accessed through the Milwr tunnel, which passes beneath the area.

== Community ==
Local facilities include a church, a children's playground / park, a primary school and a village hall.
