= Afonwen =

Village in Flintshire, Wales

Coordinates: 53.2340°N 3.3035°W

Afonwen: Welsh: Afon-wen
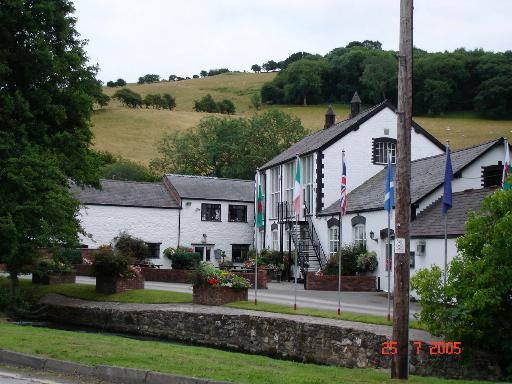
- Craft centre and Afon Chwiler at Afonwen

- Location within Flintshire
- Community: Caerwys
- Principal area: Flintshire
- Preserved county: Clwyd
- Country: Wales
- Sovereign state: United Kingdom
- Post town: MOLD
- Postcode district: CH7
- Dialling code: 01352
- Police: North Wales
- Fire: North Wales
- Ambulance: Welsh
- UK Parliament: Clwyd East
- Senedd Cymru – Welsh Parliament: Delyn

Afonwen ([ˌavɔnˈwɛn]; Welsh: Afon-wen) is a village in Flintshire, Wales. It is situated about 6 kilometres (3.7 mi) from the A55 North Wales Expressway and on the A541 Mold-Denbigh road. At the 2001 Census, the population of Afonwen was included into the civil parish of Caerwys and was 1,319, with a total ward population of 2,496.

The village's name translates to "White River". Two major paper mills operated here between 1786 and 1918. Following the closure of the mill, the site transitioned to a glove factory in 1918. The rural pass and the White River have been associated with ancient Welsh folklore and stories of "white witches".
