= Argoed, Flintshire =

Community in Flintshire, Wales

Argoed
- Community
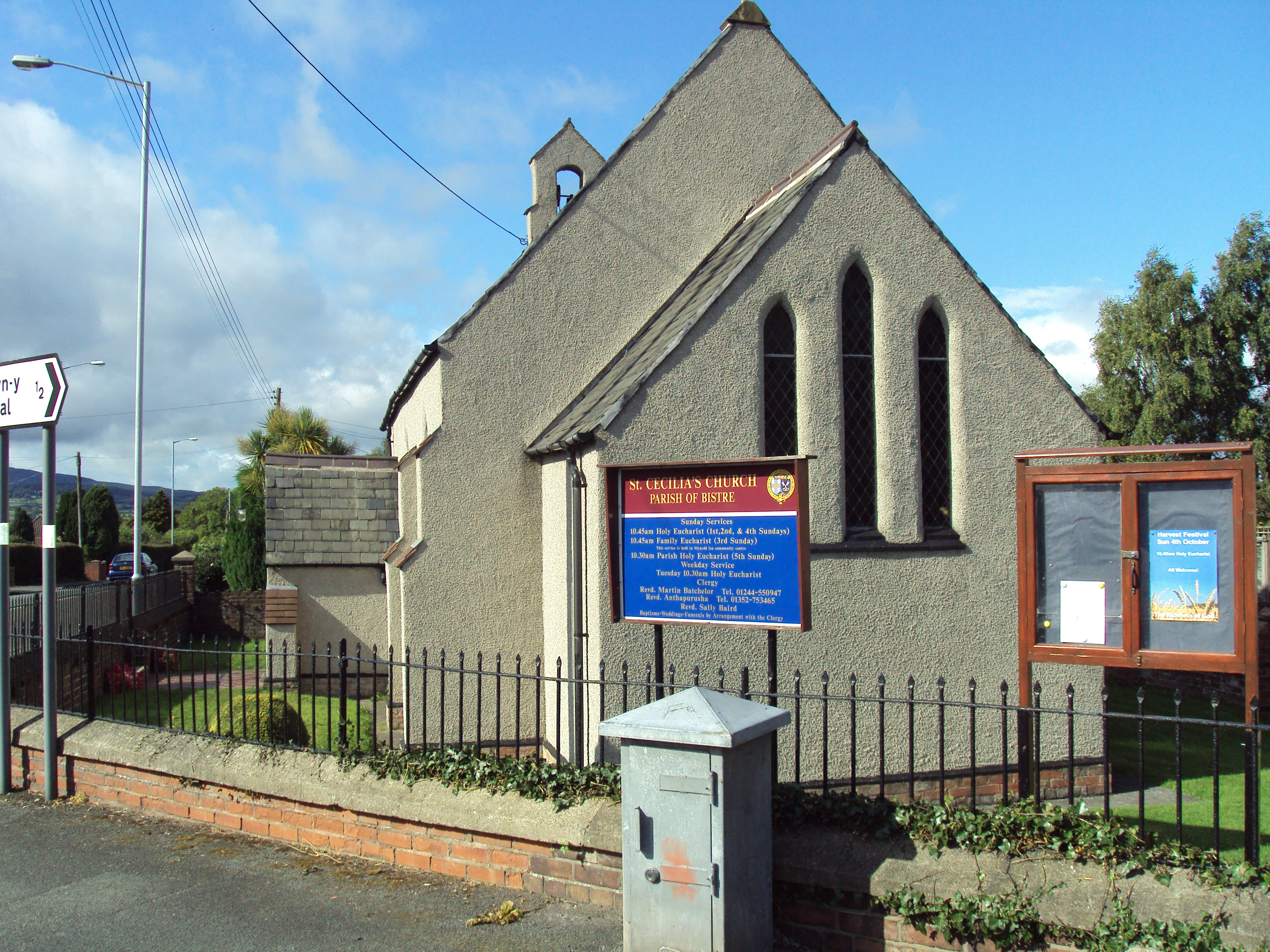
- St. Cecilia's Church, Mynydd Isa

- Location within Flintshire
- Population: 5,627 (2021)
- OS grid reference: SJ267627
  - Cardiff: 150 mi (240 km)
- Community: Argoed
- Principal area: Flintshire
- Preserved county: Clwyd
- Country: Wales
- Sovereign state: United Kingdom
- Settlements: List: Llong; Mynydd Bychan; Mynydd Isa; New Brighton
- Post town: MOLD
- Postcode district: CH7
- Dialling code: 01352
- Police: North Wales
- Fire: North Wales
- Ambulance: Welsh
- UK Parliament: Clwyd East
- Senedd Cymru – Welsh Parliament: Delyn
- Website: Council website
- List of places UK Wales Flintshire 53.15625°N 3.097888°W Map of the community

Argoed (Welsh for 'wooded area' / 'in the wood') is a community in Flintshire, Wales, located between the towns of Mold and Buckley. The largest settlement in the community is Mynydd Isa, with New Brighton and Mynydd bychan to the north and Llong on the southern boundary of the community.

The population was recorded to be 874, increasing at the 2011 census following reorganisation to 5,837, although slightly decreasing to 5,627 in 2021.

There were 179 houses in Argoed in 2001, increasing to 2,405 in 2011.

== Governance ==
The community council was formed in 1985 from part of Mold Rural Community Council. It was created as Mynydd Isa Community Council, but adopted its current name at the council's second meeting. It consists of twelve councillors, six elected from the Argoed ward and six from New Brighton.

The Flintshire County Council electoral ward of Argoed and New Brighton was created for the 2022 election. It covers the same area as the community, and elects 2 councillors.

The population of the Argoed ward at the 2011 census was 2,836.
