= Caerwys =

Town and community in Flintshire, Wales

- Town and community
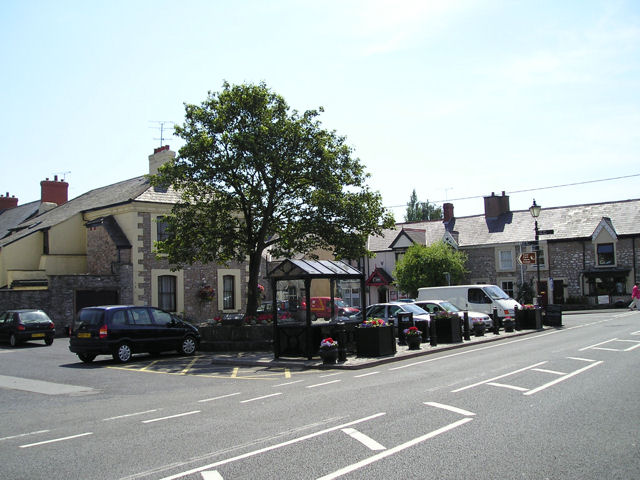
- Town Square

- Location within Flintshire
- Population: 1,243 (2021)
- OS grid reference: SJ128729
- Community: Caerwys
- Principal area: Flintshire
- Preserved county: Clwyd
- Country: Wales
- Sovereign state: United Kingdom
- Settlements: List: Afonwen; Caerwys; Croes-wian; Pant; Pen-y-cefn
- Post town: MOLD
- Postcode district: CH7
- Dialling code: 01352
- Police: North Wales
- Fire: North Wales
- Ambulance: Welsh
- UK Parliament: Clwyd East
- Senedd Cymru – Welsh Parliament: Delyn
- Website: Town website
- List of places UK Wales Flintshire 53.246°N 3.307°W Map of the community

Caerwys is a town and community in Flintshire, Wales. It is just under two miles (three kilometres) from the A55 North Wales Expressway and one mile (1.5 kilometres) from the A541 Mold-Denbigh road. At the 2001 Census, the population of Caerwys community was 1,315, with a total ward population of 2,496. Following reorganisation the community population fell at the 2011 Census to 1,283 with the ward raising to 2,569. The community includes Afonwen.

== History ==
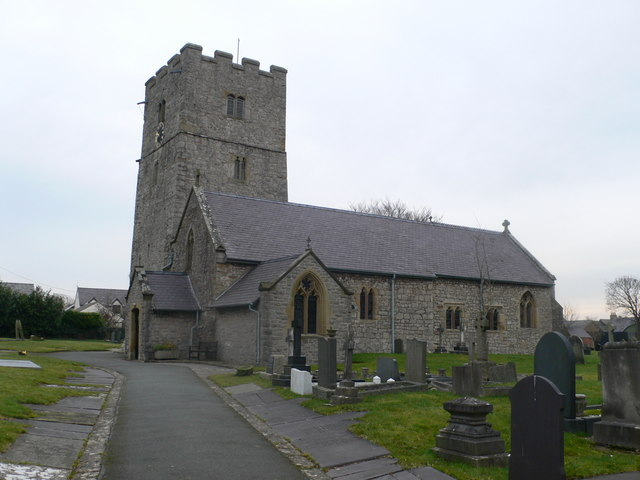
Church of St Michael

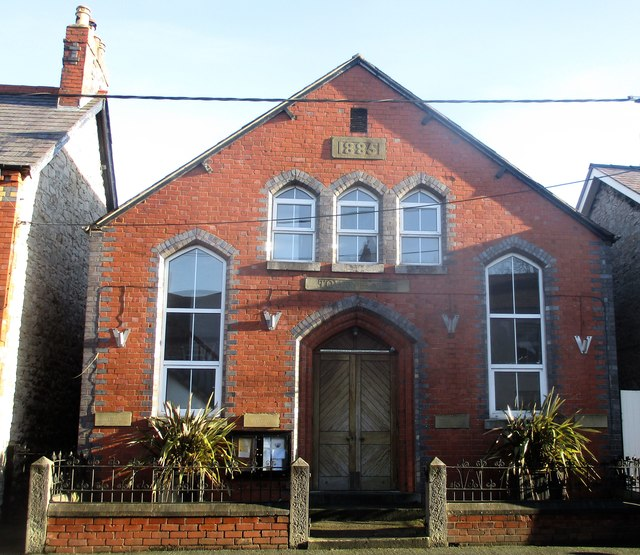
Caerwys Town Hall

Caerwys is mentioned in the Domesday Book as a small market town. The well-maintained church is dedicated to St. Michael. It has two parallel naves. Within the church is the cover slab of a tomb reputed to have been that of Elizabeth Ferrers, the wife of Dafydd ap Gruffudd, prince of Wales (d. 1283). A short, informative booklet about the church was written in 1936 and updated in 1995. As well as being surrounded by areas of outstanding natural beauty and views across mountains and valleys, the centre of Caerwys has been designated a conservation area.

In 1377 income from the Farm of Cayrouse was listed as part of the Principality issued to the Earl of Chester under the County Palatine of Chester, Caerwys being part of the Aticross Unhidated hundred.

In 1568 Queen Elizabeth I of England appointed a commission to control the activities of "minstrels, rhymers and bards", in Wales. Simwnt Fychan was summoned to meet at Caerwys and was appointed "pencerdd", i.e. the senior bard.

Caerwys and Philadelphia have important historical connections. Local doctor, Thomas Wynne, sailed to America on the ship Welcome in 1682 with William Penn. Wynne was one of the founding fathers of Philadelphia and became the first speaker of the Provisional Assembly, as well as a provincial judge. The original street plan of Philadelphia was designed on the street pattern of Caerwys. Many Welsh names crop up in the city, and several buildings built in Philadelphia resemble buildings in the Caerwys area, some of which still stand today.

Caerwys hosted two of the most important eisteddfodau of the early modern era – one in 1523, during the reign of Henry VIII of England at which Tudur Aled was present and the other, sanctioned by Elizabeth I, in 1567. Caerwys Town Hall was completed in 1885.

== Governance ==
Caerwys Town Council consists of eleven councillors, and is not divided into wards.

The Caerwys and Ysceifiog communities make up the Caerwys electoral ward on Flintshire County Council, which elects one councillor.

Caerwys is part of the Delyn constituency and North Wales region for the Senedd, and of the Clwyd East constituency for Parliament.

== Notable people ==
- Thomas Wynne (1627 in Ysceifiog – 1692), physician to William Penn, settler of Philadelphia
- John Wynne (c. 1666 in Maes-y-coed – 1743), Bishop of St Asaph and of Bath and Wells
- Thomas Jones of Denbigh (1756 at Penucha – 1820), writer and Methodist theologian.
- Angharad Llwyd (1780 at Caerwys – 1866), antiquary and prizewinner at the National Eisteddfod.
- Rowland Ellis (1841 in Caerwys – 1911), Bishop of Aberdeen and Orkney
- Myfanwy Talog (1944 in Caerwys – 1995), actress and TV presenter with the BBC

== Sport ==
The local football team Caerwys F.C. play in the Clwyd League. In the 2009/2010 season, they finished 3rd. They also have a Summer League team.
