= Grade II* listed buildings in Flintshire =

Flintshire shown within Wales

In the United Kingdom, the term listed building refers to a building or other structure officially designated as being of special architectural, historical, or cultural significance; Grade II* structures are those considered to be "particularly important buildings of more than special interest". Listing was begun by a provision in the Town and Country Planning Act 1947. Once listed, strict limitations are imposed on the modifications allowed to a building's structure or fittings. In Wales, the authority for listing under the Planning (Listed Buildings and Conservation Areas) Act 1990 rests with Cadw.

== Buildings ==
Name	Location Grid Ref. (Note: Sometimes known as OSGB36, the grid reference is based on the British national grid reference system used by the Ordnance Survey.) Geo-coordinates	Date Listed	Function	Notes	Reference Number	Image
Bryn Iorcyn Manor	Llanfynydd; SJ3004356936; 53°06′18″N 3°02′47″W	14 February 1952	House	Situated c.1km NE of Cymau at the head of a drive running W from Bryn Yorkin Road.	6	Upload Photo
Trimley Hall	Llanfynydd; SJ2775155836; 53°05′41″N 3°04′49″W	14 February 1952	Farm building	Situated c1km NW of Ffrith, reached from a series of by-roads running W from the B5101.	8	Upload Photo
St Deiniol's Parish Church	Hawarden; SJ3154565918; 53°11′09″N 3°01′33″W	7 February 1962	Church	Situated at the end of Church Lane within a walled churchyard.	12	See more images
The House of Correction	Hawarden; SJ3174665719; 53°11′03″N 3°01′22″W	7 February 1962	Lock-up	A mid-18th century lock-up traditionally ascribed to Joseph Turner. Cross Tree Lane (E. side)	21	See more images
Aston Hall	Hawarden; SJ3091967029; 53°11′45″N 3°02′08″W	7 February 1962	House	Situated off the road in its own walled grounds.	23	Upload Photo
Plas-yn-Bwl	Caergwrle, Hope; SJ3048357075; 53°06′23″N 3°02′23″W	2 July 1962	House	Located at the southern edge of Caergwrle village on an elevated site above the A 541 (Wrexham Road); situated at the end of the lane partly behind low rubble forecourt walls.	29	Upload Photo
Pack Horse Bridge	Caergwrle, Hope; SJ3061557610; 53°06′40″N 3°02′17″W	7 February 1962	Bridge	Spanning the River Alyn in the centre of Caergwrle village, at the end of Fellows Lane.	30	See more images
The Brewhouse at Fferm Farmhouse	Leeswood; SJ2791960325; 53°08′07″N 3°04′44″W	7 February 1962	Brewhouse	Situated at the end of the driveway leading to Fferm Farmhouse, to the N side of the A541 and immediately adjacent to Fferm Farmhouse.	31	Upload Photo
Rhydyn Hall	Hope; SJ3113857086; 53°06′23″N 3°01′48″W	2 July 1962	House	Overlooking the river Alyn to the E, on the line of Wat's Dyke, approximately 0.5km E of Caergwrle village centre; accessed via an unmetalled lane running S from the road.	34	Upload Photo
Top-y-Fron Hall	Connah's Quay; SJ2734469845; 53°13′14″N 3°05′23″W	13 September 1977	House	Located off the E side of the lane at the top of the hill.	55	Upload Photo
Church of St Mary	Gwaenysgor, Trelawnyd and Gwaenysgor; SJ0751981028; 53°19′05″N 3°23′23″W	11 June 1962	Church	In a walled churchyard in the centre of the village.	280	See more images
Ty Isaf	Trelawnyd and Gwaenysgor; SJ0758880933; 53°19′02″N 3°23′19″W	11 June 1962	House	At the S end of the village, in a farmyard on the W side of a minor road between Trelawnyd and Gwaenysgor.	281	Upload Photo
Leeswood Green Farm	Leeswood; SJ2635460349; 53°08′07″N 3°06′08″W	11 June 1962	Farmhouse	Situated at the end of a track off the main road, Oak Drive, which runs through Coedllai Leeswood.	286	Upload Photo
Church of SS Asaph and Kentigern	Llanasa; SJ1065181425; 53°19′20″N 3°20′34″W	11 June 1962	Church	In the centre of Llanasa surrounded by a walled churchyard.	287	See more images
Pentre Farmhouse	Llanasa; SJ0953582863; 53°20′06″N 3°21′36″W	11 June 1962	Farmhouse	Approximately 0.2km S of the Gronant village, reached by farm road from the centre of the village.	288	Upload Photo
Church of St Michael	Caerwys; SJ1273872860; 53°14′44″N 3°18′33″W	11 June 1962	Church	At the centre of a large square churchyard on the SW side of the town, with the main entrance from Pen y Cefn Road.	291	See more images
Maes-y-coed Farmhouse	Caerwys; SJ1299071490; 53°14′00″N 3°18′18″W	11 June 1962	Farmhouse	Reached down a short farm road on the S side of the A541, just W of the junction of the A541 and B5122.	293	Upload Photo
Brithdir Mawr	Cilcain; SJ1784962937; 53°09′26″N 3°13′48″W	11 June 1962	Hall House	Situated 2.5 km SW of Cilcain, reached from a minor road running W off the by road to Cilcain from Loggerheads.	298	Brithdir Mawr
Orchard Wall at Berthymaen Farm	Llanasa; SJ1254180693; 53°18′57″N 3°18′51″W	11 June 1962	Wall	On the SE side of the farmhouse and on the opposite side of the road.	300	Upload Photo
Church of St Michael and All Angels	Nannerch; SJ1667069676; 53°13′03″N 3°14′58″W	11 June 1962	Church	At the northern end of the village set back from the road.	308	See more images
Penbedw Uchaf, including attached garden wall	Nannerch; SJ1551468712; 53°12′32″N 3°15′59″W	11 June 1962	House	Approx. 1.5km SW of Nannerch village, reached by farm road on the S side of a minor road between Nannerch and Llandyrnog. The house faces S with farm buildings to the N, pond to the S and orchard to the W.	310	Upload Photo
Walgoch	Nannerch; SJ1618569149; 53°12′46″N 3°15′24″W	11 June 1962	House	Approximately 0.7km SW of Nannerch village on the S side of a minor road between Nannerch and Llandyrnog.	311	Upload Photo
St Mary's Parish Church	Nercwys; SJ2347960421; 53°08′08″N 3°08′43″W	11 June 1962	Church	Situated near the village cross-roads on a slight rise and set in its own churchyard. Village Street (W Side), Nercwys	312	See more images
Church of St Michael & All Angels	Trelawnyd, Trelawnyd and Gwaenysgor; SJ0890679634; 53°18′21″N 3°22′07″W	11 June 1962	Church	On the W side of the village and on the E side of a minor road S of London Road (A5151), the main road through the village.	316	See more images
Cross in churchyard of the Church of St Michael & All Angels	Trelawnyd, Trelawnyd and Gwaenysgor; SJ0890979618; 53°18′20″N 3°22′06″W	11 June 1962	Preaching cross	On the S side of the church.	317	Cross in churchyard of the Church of St Michael & All Angels
Northop Hall Farm (Llaneurgain)	Northop Hall; SJ2680268436; 53°12′29″N 3°05′51″W	11 June 1962	Farmhouse	To S of road, about 300m SE of crossroads with Smithy Lane.	323	Upload Photo
Coed-y-cra Uchaf	Halkyn; SJ2268270250; 53°13′25″N 3°09′34″W	11 June 1962		On the NE side of the A55 and reached by minor road from the W side by a bridge across the main road.	326	Upload Photo
Plas Uchaf	Whitford; SJ1390479243; 53°18′11″N 3°17′36″W	6 November 1962		Set down and on the W side of the lane which runs N from Whitford to Tre Mostyn.	337	Upload Photo
Bryn Sion	Ysceifiog; SJ1365571985; 53°14′16″N 3°17′43″W	11 June 1962		Approx. 0.75km NE of Afonwen and reached by private road on the W side of a minor road between Afonwen and Babell.	347	Upload Photo
Pantgwynmawr	Ysceifiog; SJ1551872233; 53°14′25″N 3°16′02″W	11 June 1962		Approx. 0.8km NNE of Ysceifiog church, on the NE side at the end of a lane N of a minor road between Ysceifiog and Lixwm.	348	Upload Photo
Llwyn-erddyn	Ysceifiog; SJ1760172636; 53°14′40″N 3°14′10″W	11 June 1962		Approx. 1.8km NNE of Lixwm and reached by private road W of a minor road between Lixwm and Brynford.	350	Upload Photo
Drybridge Lodge, Mostyn Hall	Mostyn; SJ1508180078; 53°18′39″N 3°16′34″W	12 October 1969	House	Built above a minor road between Rhewl Mostyn and Tre-Mostyn to the S of Mostyn Hall at the end of a long drive, now a footpath, from Pennsylvania Lodge in Whitford.	352	Drybridge Lodge, Mostyn Hall
Bethesda Welsh Presbyterian Chapel and schoolroom	Mold; SJ2367963780; 53°09′56″N 3°08′35″W	29 June 1981	Chapel	Built 1863. New Street	391	See more images
Parish Church of St. James	Holywell; SJ1853376276; 53°16′38″N 3°13′24″W	26 July 1951	Church	Perpendicular church, 14th century, largely rebuilt 1769-70, chancel added 1884-5. Greenfield Street	428	See more images
Holywell Junction railway station	Holywell; SJ1962277941; 53°17′32″N 3°12′26″W	10 January 1970	Railway Station	Situated at the far end of the road on the SW side of the coastal railway.	510	See more images
Stokyn Hall	Greenfield, Holywell; SJ1793678025; 53°17′34″N 3°13′57″W	19 August 1991	Country house	Set in its own grounds, close to the NW boundary of the Community Council area.	512	Stokyn Hall
Agricultural Range to S. Side of the Farmyard	Holway, Holywell; SJ1730976214; 53°16′35″N 3°14′30″W	24 February 1976		Originally a monastic grange to the Cistercian Abbey of Basingwerk. Grange, Grange Lane, Holway	514	Upload Photo
Hartsheath Hall	Leeswood; SJ2863660246; 53°08′05″N 3°04′05″W	4 October 1980	Hall	Situated in a fine nineteenth century landscape park to the N side of the A541 approximately 0.5 km to the E of Pontblyddyn.	537	Upload Photo
Coach-house and Stables to NE of Hartsheath	Leeswood; SJ2878560386; 53°08′09″N 3°03′57″W	4 October 1980	Coach house and stables	Situated in the landscape park, at end of track to NE of Hartsheath Hall.	539	Upload Photo
Soughton Hall	Sychdyn, Northop; SJ2481967354; 53°11′53″N 3°07′37″W	15 April 1985	Country House Hotel	Reached by the S driveway, a formal tree-lined avenue, and set in parkland.	547	See more images
Garden Walls, Corner Turrets, Gates and Gate Piers at Soughton Hall	Sychdyn, Northop; SJ2483867314; 53°11′51″N 3°07′36″W	15 April 1985	Walls, etc.	The walled gardens surround all 4 sides of Soughton Hall; the entrance gates are to the S.	548	See more images
Stable Block at Soughton Hall	Sychdyn, Northop; SJ2480267261; 53°11′50″N 3°07′38″W	15 April 1985	Stables	In a tree-lined enclosure to the SW of the house and facing N. The coach house range is attached at the NW corner.	549	Upload Photo
Coach-house Range at Soughton Hall	Sychdyn, Northop; SJ2478367268; 53°11′50″N 3°07′39″W	15 April 1985	Coach house	In a tree-lined enclosure to the SW of the house and attached to the stable block at the SE corner. Tall rubble retaining wall to N, beyond which are formal gardens.	550	Upload Photo
Talacre Abbey (Westbury Castle)	Talacre, Llanasa; SJ1044083375; 53°20′23″N 3°20′48″W	4 February 1987	Country House	In its own grounds E of Gronant village, on an elevated site overlooking the Dee Estuary to the N. Now renamed Westbury Castle	558	Talacre Abbey (Westbury Castle)
Riding school & stable at Talacre Abbey	Talacre, Llanasa; SJ1039083283; 53°20′20″N 3°20′50″W	4 February 1987	Stables	To the SW of the house and set into the bank of the main approach road.	559	Upload Photo
Banqueting House in Walled Garden at Talacre Abbey	Talacre, Llanasa; SJ1013683300; 53°20′20″N 3°21′04″W	4 February 1987	Banqueting house	Within the E wall of the walled garden W of the house.	560	Upload Photo
Grotto adjoining Folly Tower at Talacre Abbey	Talacre, Llanasa; SJ1051083330; 53°20′21″N 3°20′44″W	4 February 1987	Grotto	In woodland on the SE side of the house, and S of the Folly Tower.	563	Upload Photo
Home Farm at Talacre Abbey	Talacre, Llanasa; SJ1019683145; 53°20′15″N 3°21′01″W	4 February 1987	Farmhouse	On the N side of a track leading from the end of Abbey Drive in Gronant to Talacre Abbey, and approximately 350m SW of the house.	564	Upload Photo
Leeswood Hall	Leeswood; SJ2525661372; 53°08′39″N 3°07′08″W	22 October 1952	Country house	Situated on the crest of hill close to the by-road from Mold to Leeswood village. Set in an exceptional early C18 landscape park.	567	See more images
Pair of Lodges flanking N driveway to Leeswood Hall	Leeswood; SJ2544262029; 53°09′01″N 3°06′59″W	22 October 1952	Lodges	Situated facing each other across wide forecourt, linked by late C20 iron work railings. Disused N driveway to Leeswood Hall runs from lodges across meadow to S.	573	Pair of Lodges flanking N driveway to Leeswood Hall
Black Gates and Screens at Entrance to the Tower	Nercwys; SJ2424762206; 53°09′06″N 3°08′03″W	22 October 1952	Gates	Located on the W side of the main Mold-Nercwys road. Formerly Listed together with Leeswood Hall	574	Upload Photo
Parkgate Farm Farmhouse and attached Shippon	Northop; SJ2441668252; 53°12′21″N 3°07′59″W	6 March 1991	Farmhouse	On the S edge of Northop and on a triangular site bound by roads. Reached by a narrow by-road which cuts off the NE angle of the triangle. The farmhouse faces E with shippon to N.	592	Upload Photo
2 Gelli Fawr	Whitford; SJ1277978170; 53°17′36″N 3°18′36″W	22 October 1952	Cottage	On the S side of a lane which runs NW from a roundabout on the A5151. The house, now divided, is set back from the road with long front gardens. To the rear, a boundary wall divides the rear gardens and joins a former stable. No 2 is to the R.	14877	Upload Photo
Colomendy	Ysceifiog; SJ1321069390; 53°12′52″N 3°18′04″W	22 October 1952	House	Approximately 2km SSW of Ddol reached at the end of a minor road S of the A541.	14879	Upload Photo
Gwysaney	Halkyn; SJ2276666452; 53°11′22″N 3°09′27″W	22 October 1952	House	In extensive grounds on the N side of Mold and reached by private drive on the N side of the A541.	14885	See more images
Berthymaen	Llanasa; SJ1249480731; 53°18′59″N 3°18′54″W	22 October 1952	House	On the W side of a minor road on the NE side of Trelogan.	14887	Upload Photo
Maes-y-Groes Bella	Cilcain; SJ1882563322; 53°09′39″N 3°12′56″W	22 October 1952	House	Situated set back from the road 2.2 km SE of Cilcain, reached from the by road between Loggerheads and Cilcain.	14890	Maes-y-Groes Bella
Barn at Nerquis Hall, Nerquis Hall Estate	Nercwys; SJ2412460044; 53°07′56″N 3°08′08″W	12 December 1994	Barn	Located at the E side of the service court.	15214	Upload Photo
U-Shaped Agricultural Range to the W of Fron Hall	Gwernymynydd; SJ2224062104; 53°09′01″N 3°09′51″W	12 December 1994	Farm building	Located to the W of Fron Hall. Swan Lane (W side), Fron Hall	15257	Upload Photo
Garden Walls and Pavilions at Rhual (including attached Walls and Gatepiers to the Drive Entrance),	Gwernaffield; SJ2212164841; 53°10′30″N 3°10′00″W	22 October 1952	Walls and Pavilions	Largely unaltered formal gardens thought to have been built by Evan Edwards post 1660.	16135	Upload Photo
Church of St John	Rhydymwyn, Cilcain; SJ2045866924; 53°11′36″N 3°11′31″W	16 October 1995	Church	Situated in the churchyard close to the centre of the village. Church Lane	16440	See more images
Halkyn Castle and attached Stable Block	Halkyn; SJ2094570916; 53°13′46″N 3°11′09″W	26 November 1996		In extensive grounds approximately 300m S of Halkyn Church.	17792	See more images
St John the Baptist's Church	Penyffordd; SJ3049962812; 53°09′28″N 3°02′27″W	6 May 1997	Church	Situated in a churchyard on the N side of the A5104 at the N end of Penymynydd in an area also known as Pentrobin.	18470	Upload Photo
St Matthew's Church	Buckley; SJ2839664695; 53°10′28″N 3°04′22″W	8 November 1997	Church	Situated in a churchyard off the E side of Church Road in the NE part of Buckley.	18755	See more images
Plymouth House and adjoining Coach House	Northop; SJ2448968368; 53°12′25″N 3°07′55″W	17 December 1997	House	Near the E end of the High Street, approx 70m from the junction with Northop Road. Set back from the street and facing N.	19185	Upload Photo
Gazebo at Plas Teg	Hope; SJ2873959718; 53°07′48″N 3°03′59″W	5 June 1998	Gazebo	Immediately E of Plas Teg.	19762	Upload Photo
Old Court	Caerwys; SJ1280872949; 53°14′47″N 3°18′29″W	22 October 1952		Fronting the road approximately 40m E of the junction with North and South Streets.	22774	Upload Photo
Grammar School	Northop; SJ2466668518; 53°12′30″N 3°07′46″W	22 October 1952	School	Located in the churchyard and forming part of the E boundary. The church is to the SW.	24440	Grammar School
Barn at Gellilyfdy	Ysceifiog; SJ1463673887; 53°15′18″N 3°16′52″W	22 October 1952	Barn	Approx. 100m SE of the farmhouse.	24676	Upload Photo
The Roman Catholic Church of St David	Pantasaph, Whitford; SJ1607175991; 53°16′27″N 3°15′36″W	25 May 2001	Church	Adjoining the R side of Pantasaph Friary and in the grounds.	25240	See more images
Franciscan Friary	Pantasaph, Whitford; SJ1606776019; 53°16′28″N 3°15′36″W	25 May 2001	Friary	Set back from the road in grounds and approached by driveways. The Church of St David adjoins to the R. A linking range to the L joins the friary with the guest house and includes the entrance to the buildings.	25241	Franciscan Friary
Guest House including linking range at Pantasaph Friary	Pantasaph, Whitford; SJ1602476014; 53°16′28″N 3°15′39″W	25 May 2001	Friary building	Set back from the road and approached by driveways. The linking range, which includes the main entrance, joins the guest house with the friary, which is to the R.	25242	Upload Photo
1 Gelli Fawr	Whitford; SJ1278678166; 53°17′36″N 3°18′36″W	22 October 1952	House	On the S side of a lane which runs NW from a roundabout on the A5151. The house, now divided, is set back from the road with long front gardens. To the rear, a boundary wall divides the rear gardens and joins a former stable. No 1 is to the L.	25259	Upload Photo
Dovecote and adjoining range at Mostyn Hall	Mostyn; SJ1476680645; 53°18′57″N 3°16′51″W	28 March 2002	Dovecote	Forming the SE boundary of the farmyard and at right-angles to Porth Mawr.	26265	Upload Photo
South-west Farm Building at Mostyn Hall Farm	Mostyn; SJ1472680649; 53°18′57″N 3°16′53″W	28 March 2002	Farm building	Along the SW side of the farmyard at Mostyn Hall, and at right-angles to the dovecote.	26267	Upload Photo
North-east Barn at Mostyn Hall Farm with adjoining stable range and flanking wall	Mostyn; SJ1475680683; 53°18′58″N 3°16′52″W	28 March 2002	Barn	Forms the NE range of the large farmyard, and in staggered alignment with Porth Mawr, bounding the hall gardens on their SW side.	26269	Upload Photo
North-west Range at Mostyn Hall Farm	Mostyn; SJ1470380671; 53°18′58″N 3°16′55″W	28 March 2002	Farm building	Forms the NW boundary of the main yard at Mostyn Farm.	26270	Upload Photo
Church of St Mary	Broughton, Broughton and Bretton; SJ3428364028; 53°10′10″N 2°59′04″W	29 January 2003	Church	In the angle between Church Road and Chester Road (A5104), to the E of a large roundabout. Set in a large rectangular churchyard retaining some original boundary walling, the NW wall replaced when the road was widened.	80779	See more images

== See also ==
- Grade I listed buildings in Flintshire
