= Gwernaffield with Pantymwyn =

Community in Flintshire, Wales

Coordinates: 53°10′N 3°12′W

- Community
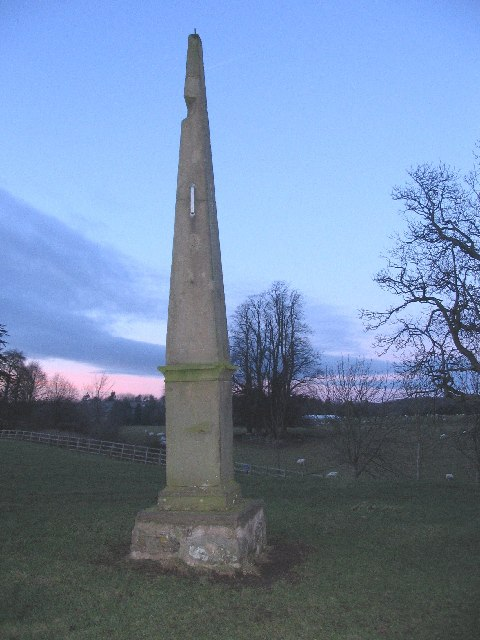
- Alleluia monument near Rhual

- Location within Flintshire
- Population: 1,885 (2021)
- OS grid reference: SJ201645
- Principal area: Flintshire
- Preserved county: Clwyd
- Country: Wales
- Sovereign state: United Kingdom
- Settlements: List: Gwernaffield; Pant-y-buarth; Pantymwyn; Pont-newydd
- Post town: Mold
- Postcode district: CH7
- Dialling code: 01352
- Police: North Wales
- Fire: North Wales
- Ambulance: Welsh
- UK Parliament: Clwyd East
- Senedd Cymru – Welsh Parliament: Delyn
- Website: Community website
- List of places UK Wales Flintshire Map of the community

Gwernaffield with Pantymwyn is a community in Flintshire, Wales with a population of 1942 as of the 2011 UK census. It includes the villages of Gwernaffield and Pantymwyn.

The community council was formed in 1985. It consists of twelve councillors, six elected from the Gwernaffield ward and six from Pantymwyn.

For Flintshire County Council, the community is part of the Gwernaffield and Gwernymynydd electoral ward, which elects two councillors.
