= Cadole =

Village in Flintshire, Wales

Coordinates: 53.15638°N 3.19066°W

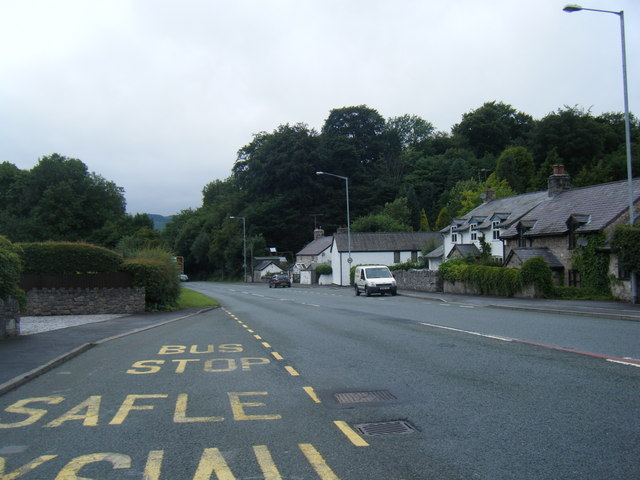
- A494 at Cadole

- Location within Flintshire
- OS grid reference: SJ204628
- Community: Gwernymynydd and Cadole
- Principal area: Flintshire
- Preserved county: Clwyd
- Country: Wales
- Sovereign state: United Kingdom
- Post town: MOLD
- Postcode district: CH7
- Dialling code: 01352
- Police: North Wales
- Fire: North Wales
- Ambulance: Welsh
- UK Parliament: Clwyd East
- Senedd Cymru – Welsh Parliament: Delyn

Cadole is a village in Flintshire, Wales. It lies west of Gwernymynydd and Mold (Yr Wyddgrug), south of Gwernaffield and to the east of the Clwydian Range, part of an Area of Outstanding Natural Beauty.

The name appears as Cat-hole, Cat Hole and Cathole on eighteenth century maps, and the village was still known by this name in living memory. The Place-Names of Flintshire states that the name was deliberately changed to its modern spelling following the gentrification of the area, so that the name could be derived from the Welsh place name elements 'Cae' (field) and 'Dôl' (meadow). One reason often given for this deliberate change was that English incomers found the name Cat-hole (or its English homographs) to be unseemly.

== Landmarks ==
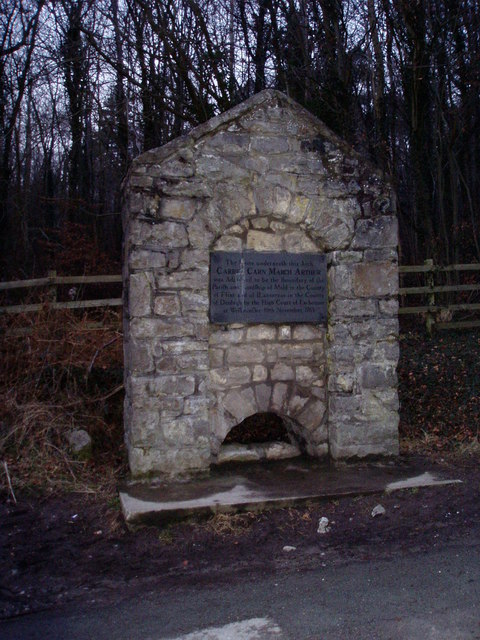
Carreg Carn March Arthur

Just across the Denbighshire boundary from Cadole, and next to the A494, is Carreg Carn March Arthur (Welsh for 'the Stone of Arthur's Horse's Hoof'), a boundary marker consisting of a stone arch over an irregularly shaped rock. A plaque on the arch reads:

The stone underneath this Arch Carreg Carn March Arthur was Adjudged to be the Boundary of the Parish and Lordship of Mold in the county of Flint and of Llanverres in the County of Denbigh by the High Court of Exchequer at Westminster 10th November 1763

This monument features in a 1796 watercolour by John Ingleby.
