= Saint Ilid =

Welsh saint

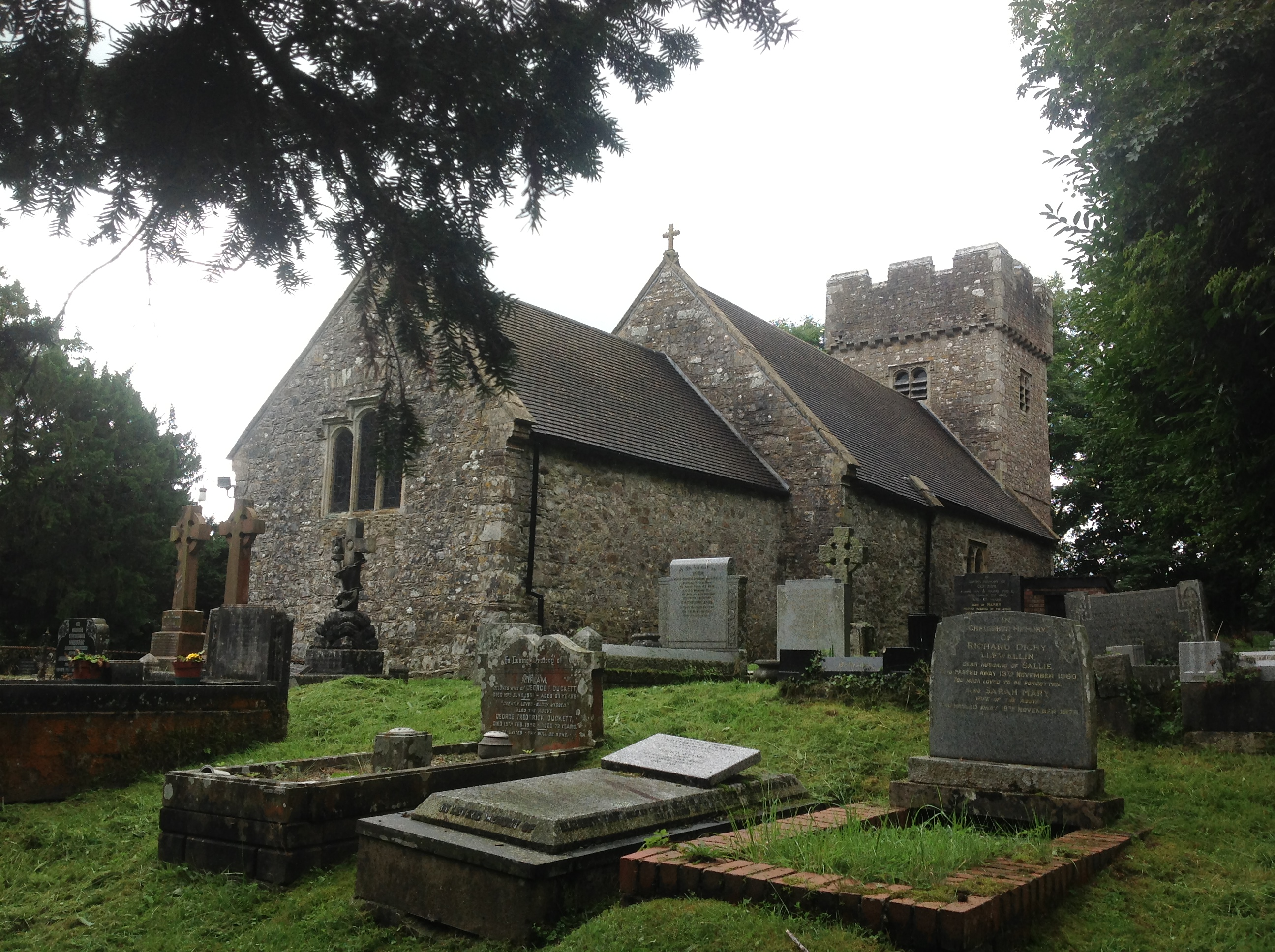
Chapel of St Ilid & St Curig - Llanilid Wales

Saint Ilid is a semi-legendary saint of Wales. He has at times been identified as Joseph of Arimathea, perhaps because he is referred to as a "man of Israel" and to have been born Jewish. Moreover, he is said to have returned from Rome with Caratacus, Saint Cyllin and Eigen and formed a religious college of twelve named Cor Eurgain (the choir of Eurgain), suggesting the early entry of Christianity into Britain. He may be commemorated in the village Llanilid. According to Thomas Morgan, Llanilid follows the tradition of Welsh place names attached to a parish in taking its title from the saint to whom the local church is dedicated. In Llanilid the local church is St. Ilid & St Curig's church, and Morgan states that this relates to Ilid a person who introduced Christianity to Wales in the 1st century. This research may be connected to that of famed literary forger Iolo Morganwg, who produced elaborate tales of Ilid going as far as stating that it was the Welsh names of Joseph of Arimathea. Morgan relates that "Llan" – "Ilid", refers to the 'parish of St Ilid'. This has been challenged by R. W. D. Fenn, who, after studying the Book of Llandaff and Nennius's Historia Brittonum writes in 1962 that the Latin equivalent of Ilid represents the name of a district, similar to Llandovery, and not a person. Fenn then writes that in 1566 Llanilid was dedicated to Ilid and Curig, whom he connects to the saints more commonly known in Christian tradition as Julietta and Quiricus. He links this through the Appendix of the Book of Llandaff which states that the church at Llanilid is first given as the 'Church of St Julitta'.

His feast day is 30 June.
