= Top-y-Fron Hall =

Country house in the community of Connah's Quay, Wales

Coordinates: 53.2207°N 3.0896°W

Top-y-Fron Hall is a country house in the community of Connah's Quay, Wales. In 1977 it became a Grade II* listed building.

== History ==
The house dates from the 18th century and is an example of the earliest brick houses in Flintshire. The architecture is early Georgian era.

The house featured in 2016 in the Channel 4 series Obsessive Compulsive Cleaners.

== See also ==
- Grade II* listed buildings in Flintshire
