= Northop Hall Cricket Club Ground =

Cricket ground in Flintshire, Wales

Coordinates: 53.20374°N 3.10265°W

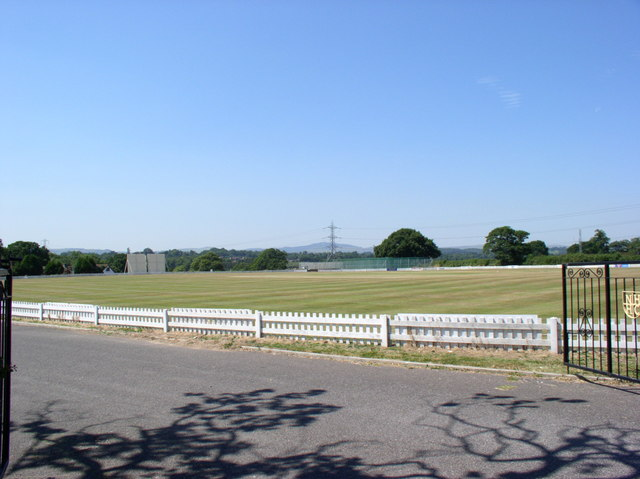

Ground information
- Location: Northop Hall, Flintshire
- Establishment: 1908 (first recorded match)

Team information
Wales Minor Counties	(1992-1995)
- As of 19 August 2010; Source: Ground profile

Northop Hall Cricket Club Ground is a cricket ground in Northop Hall, Flintshire. The first recorded match on the ground was in 1908, In 1985 Welsh Schools played Scotland Under-19s. In 1992, Wales Minor Counties played a MCCA Knockout Trophy match against Staffordshire, representing the Welsh side's first use of the ground. The following year, Wales Minor Counties played, what is to date the only Minor Counties Championship match held at the ground against Oxfordshire. In 1995, Wales Minor Counties played Cumberland in the MCCA Knockout Trophy, in what is to date the Welsh side's last visit to the ground.

The ground has also held a single List-A match which came in the 1994 NatWest Trophy which saw Wales Minor Counties play Middlesex.

In local domestic cricket, Northop Hall Cricket Club Ground is the home ground of Northop Hall Cricket Club who play in the Liverpool and District Cricket Competition.
