= Saint Eigen =

Saint Eigen, also spelled Eurgen, Eurgain or Eurgan, was the legendary, and possibly historical first female Christian saint among the Britons. Her name has doubtfully been linked to two Welsh churches and is found in manuscripts from the collection of Iolo Morganwg making historical evidence of her existence dubious and limited.

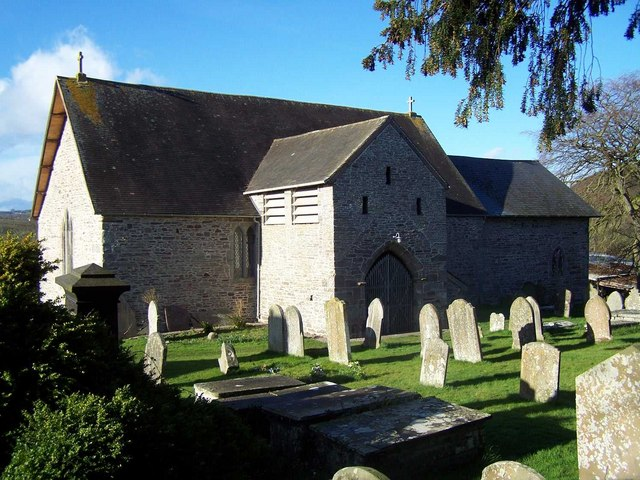
The parish church of Saint Eigon in Llanigon, Wales

Eigen is noted as the daughter of Caratacus in the History of Dunraven Manuscript, a manuscript giving the genealogy of Taliesin from the collection of Thomas Hopkin of Coychurch, one from the Havod Uchtryd collection and in an extract he claimed to have copied from the Long Book of Thomas Truman. This reference can also be found in the family records of Iestyn ab Gwrgant, where it is said of her; "She lived in the close of the first century, and was married to Sarllog, who was a lord of Caer Sarllog, or the present Old Sarum". In this manuscript, Eigen is said to have returned from Rome with Caratacus with Saint Cyllin and Saint Ilid and formed a religious college of twelve named Cor Eurgain (the choir of Eurgain), suggesting the early entry of Christianity into Britain; "the Cymry embraced the faith in Christ through the teaching of the saints of Cor-Eurgain". Attempts have also been made to identify Eigen with the Claudia mentioned by Saint Paul in the Second Epistle to Timothy, however evidence for this is largely coincidental. Some authors also claim she was called Gladys on the suggestion that this was a Welsh word for princess.

Eigen is also discussed as the first female saint in the works of Rice Rees, Jane Williams, Sabine Baring-Gould and John Williams (Ab Ithel).

In the annals of Tacitus, a daughter of Caratacus is mentioned appearing in front of the Roman Senate and Emperor Claudius in approximately 53 CE. Caratacus' daughter is never named in the record of Tacitus and she is not mentioned with her mother, father and uncles as having been given a pardon from the brutality of a Roman execution by the Emperor.

Eigen features in a cantata by Edward Elgar in 1897-8 devoted to the defeat and capture of the king by the Romans. It was first performed at the Leeds choral festival in 1898. Her name in the Cantana has variously been claimed to be both historical and derived from a neighbour of Elgar's in Malvern called Eigen Stone. Eigen, spelt as Eigon is also the subject of a modern, time-slip novel by Barbara Erskine called The Warrior's Princess, published in 2008.

The parish church of Llanigon, Wales is dedicated to "Saint Eigon", but this almost certainly refers to Eigion, brother of St Cynidr, to whom the parish church in neighbouring Glasbury was dedicated.

Another Welsh church in Northop (Welsh: Llaneurgain), Flintshire, is dedicated to "Saint Eurgain", said to have been the daughter of Prince Maelgwn Gwynedd and niece of St. Asaph. She is said to have lived in Flintshire in the 6th century CE and has a feast day on 30 June. There is evidence that the church of St Eurgain and St Peter has existed since the 6th century.
