= Tarbert House =

House in County Kerry, Ireland

Coordinates: 52.5797°N 9.3690°W

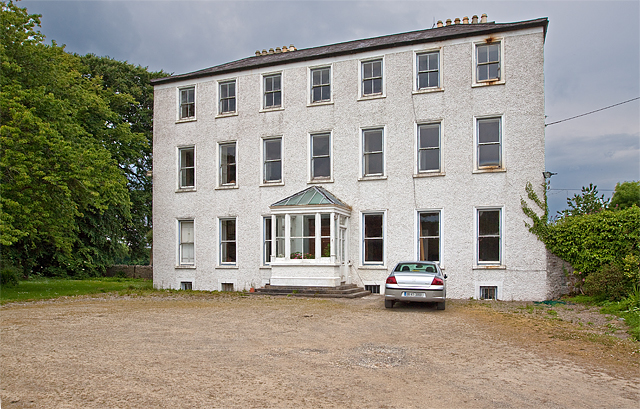
Tarbert House (2009)

Tarbert House is located in Tarbert, County Kerry, Ireland.

== History ==
The house dates from 1690. This Georgian era house in the Queen Anne style architecture was built for John Leslie. It remains the Leslie family home to this day, and is occasionally open to the public during the summer months. Past visitors to the house have included Daniel O'Connell, Charlotte Brontë, Benjamin Franklin, Lord Kitchener, Winston Churchill, and Jonathan Swift.

The house featured in 2016 in the Channel 4 series Obsessive Compulsive Cleaners.
