= Soughton Hall =

Grade II* country house & hotel in Flintshire, Wales

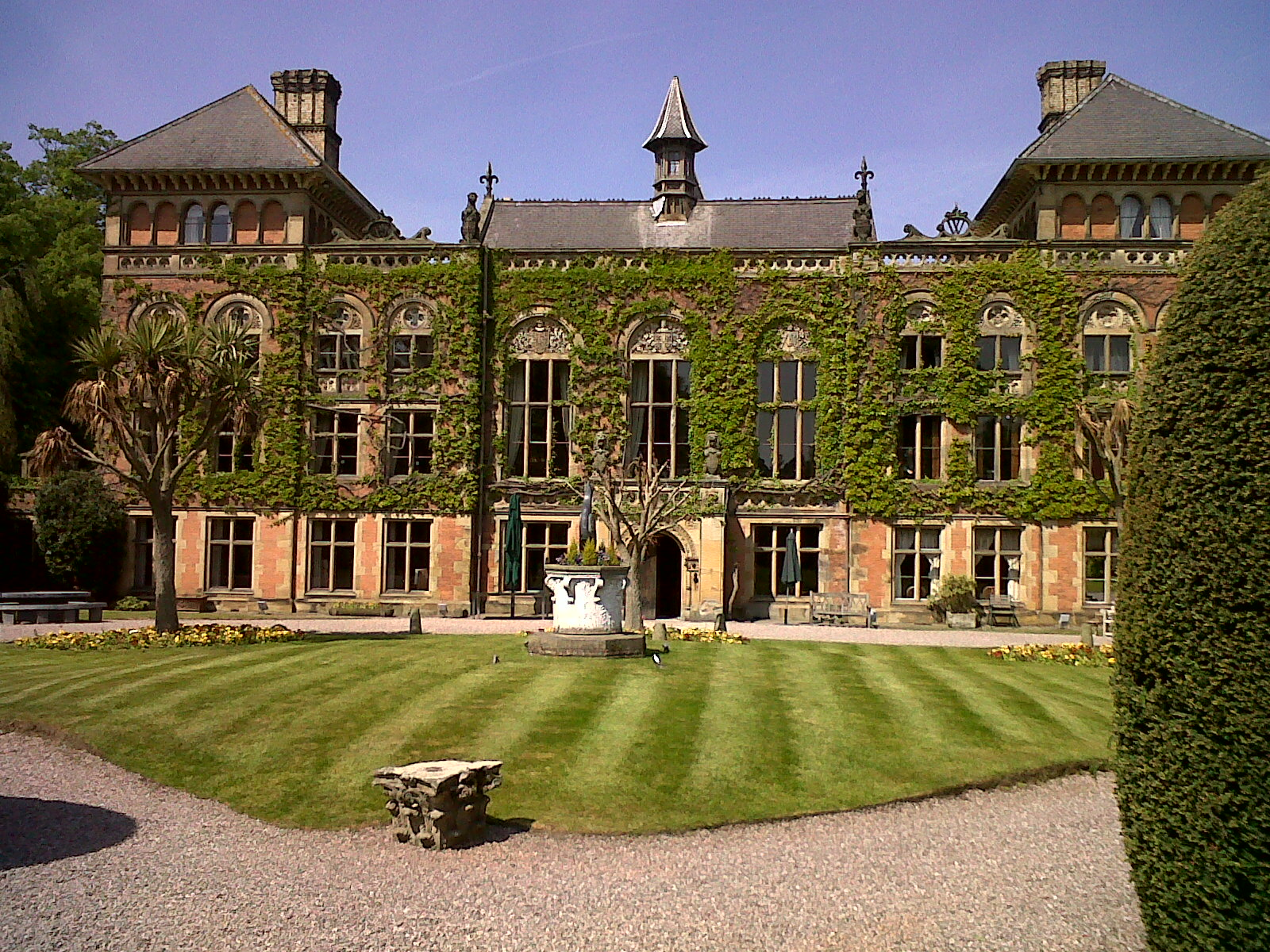
- Front elevation of Soughton Hall, May 2011
- Interactive map of the Soughton Hall area

General information
- Type: Country house
- Location: Sychdyn, Flintshire, Wales
- Coordinates: 53.197951433888°N 3.1268613718707°W
- Construction started: 1714
- Renovated: 1820/1880
- Client: Edward Conway

Design and construction
- Designations: Grade II* listed

Renovating team
- Architect: Charles Barry

Soughton Hall is a Grade II* listed country house hotel in Sychdyn (Soughton), Flintshire, Wales. William John Bankes inherited Soughton Hall in 1815.

The parks and gardens are listed as Grade II* in the Cadw/ICOMOS Register of Parks and Gardens of Special Historic Interest in Wales. Notable guests that have stayed include Luciano Pavarotti, Michael Jackson and King Juan Carlos I of Spain.

== Early history ==
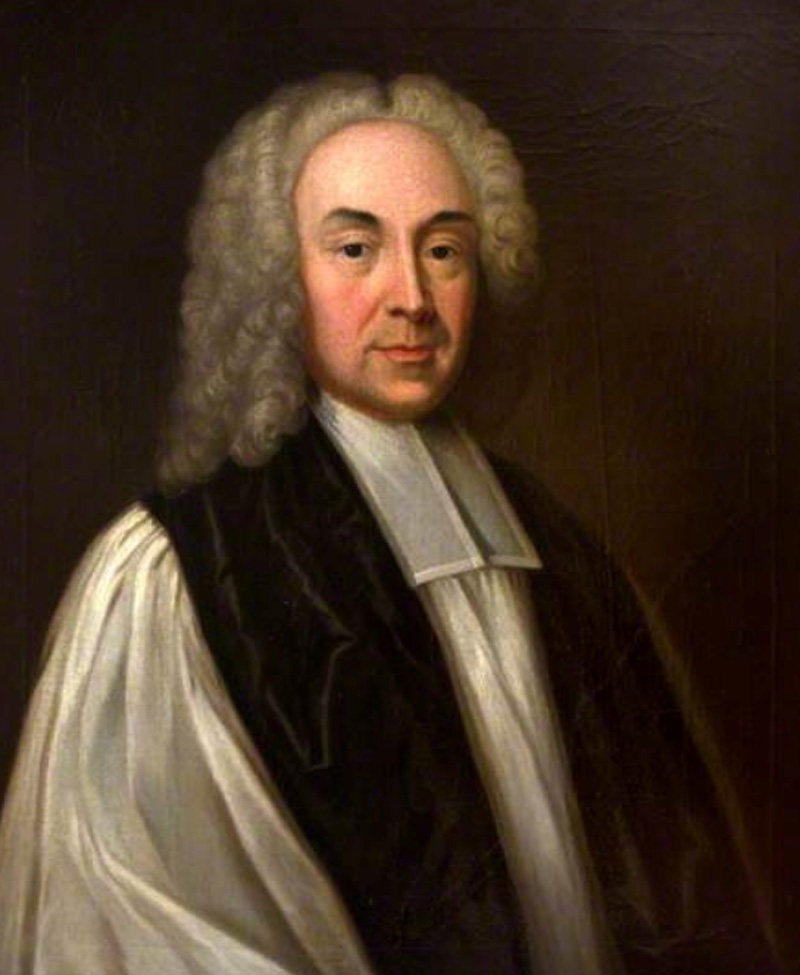
Bishop John Wynne

Edward Conway built Soughton Hall in 1714. His family had owned the estate for several generations and he inherited the land when his father John Conway died in 1689. Because of financial difficulties he was forced to sell the house in 1732 to Bishop John Wynne.

Bishop John Wynne was born in 1667. His father was Humphrey Wynne of Maes-y-coed, Caerwys. He was educated at Oxford University and in 1715 was appointed Bishop of St Asaph in Flintshire and in 1727 became Bishop of Bath and Wells in Somerset. In 1720 he married Anne Pugh, daughter and heiress of Robert Pugh of Pennarth. The couple had two sons and two daughters.

At the age of 65 in 1732 Bishop Wynne bought Soughton Hall. He was a horticulturist and planted several avenues of lime trees on the estate, many of the trees can be still seen today. After he died in 1743 his son John inherited the estate and when he died unmarried in 1801 his brother Sir William Wynne became the owner. Bishop Wynne's daughter Margaret had married Henry Bankes of Corfe Castle, Dorset. It was this marriage that brought Soughton Hall indirectly into the Bankes family because when her brother Sir William Wynne died unmarried in 1815 the Hall was inherited by her grandson William John Bankes.

== The Bankes family ==
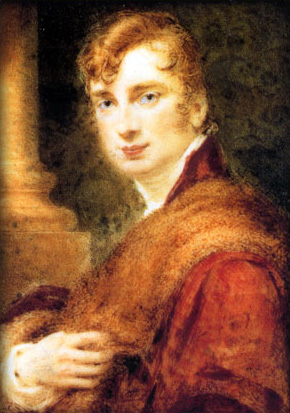
William John Bankes.

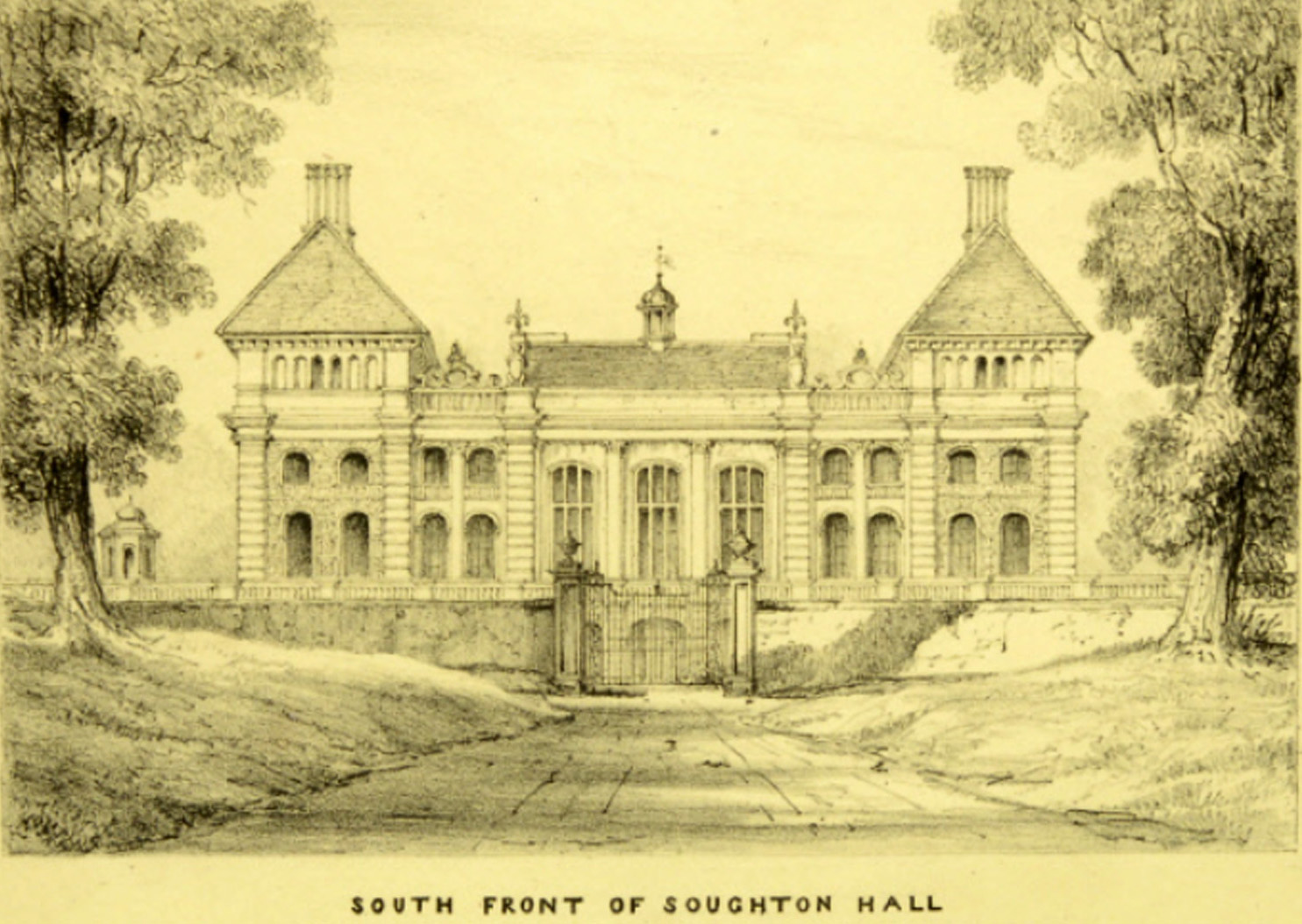
The South front of Soughton Hall circa 1820

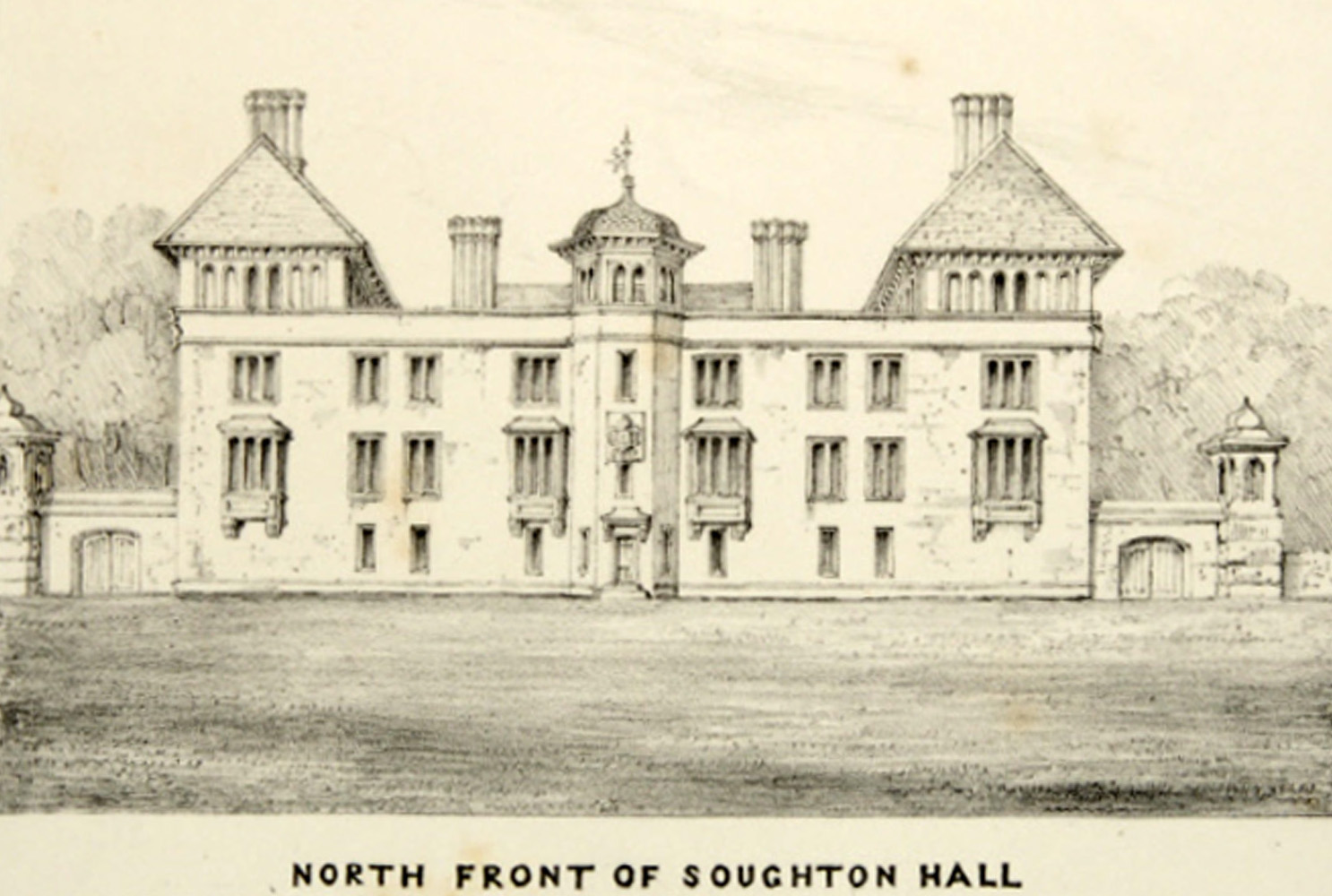
The North front of Soughton Hall circa 1820

William John Bankes was born in 1786. His father was Henry Bankes who owned Kingston Lacy. He is described by one historian in the following terms.

"William was a brilliant and eccentric man whose contemporaries feared he would dissipate his talent and very considerable scholarship by the breadth of his interests and his volatile personality. At Cambridge, rich charming and good looking he may have outshone even Byron, who was to remain a lifelong friend, by his conscious adoption of immense style, his wit and pretensions to grandeur. Extremely well read in the classics, including the classical writers of Egypt and Nubia. He left a potential career in Parliament to follow in the steps of Byron and William Beckford to Spain and Portugal to pursue a Bohemian lifestyle among the gypsies of Granada and then for the risk and adventure of travel in the Near East.”"

William inherited Soughton Hall from his great uncle Sir William Wynne in 1815 at the age of 29. At this stage he owned no other property so he decided to make the house a showpiece. After touring Europe and the Middle East between 1812 and 1820 he commissioned Charles Barry a fellow traveller to redesign the existing Soughton Hall to reflect the style of the buildings he had seen on his travels. In 1834 on the death of his father he inherited Kingston Lacy and again he commissioned Charles Barry to make major alternations to this property. In 1841 William was involved in a scandal and was forced to live the rest of his life in exile. He transferred his property his brother George Bankes who inherited it in 1855 when William died. George died in 1856 and Soughton Hall was inherited by his younger brother Reverend Edward Bankes.

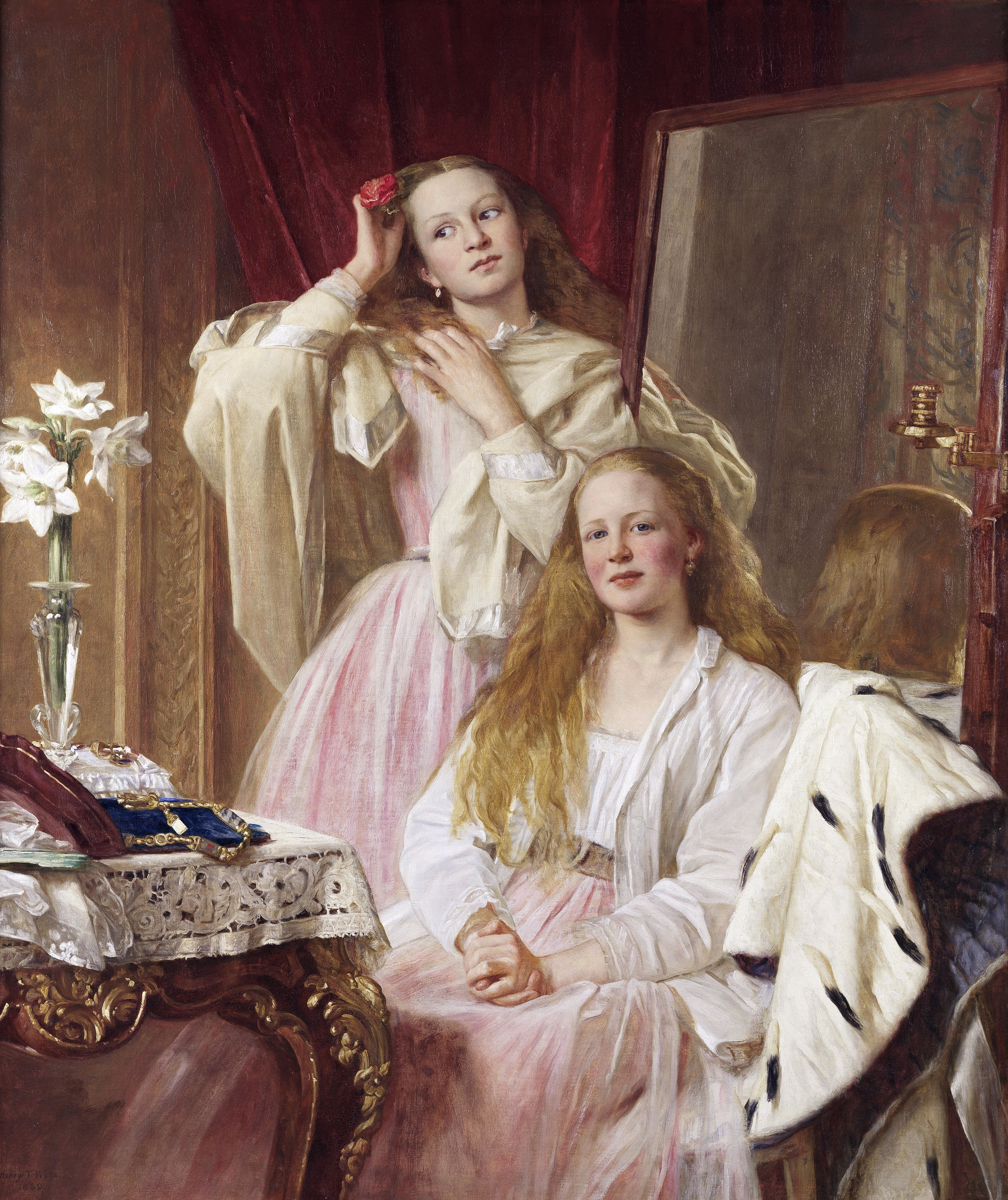
Emma and Frederica Bankes

Reverend Edward Bankes married twice and had seven children. Two of his daughters by his second marriage were Emma and Frederica who were twins. In 1869 when they were 22 years old they had their portrait painted by Henry Tanworth Wells who was a well-known English painter of that time. The painting is shown. They were born in 1847 in Bristol and lived part of their lives at Gloucester College, Oxford where their father was the rector. The family also had a villa at Weymouth where they frequently stayed. The girls were often mentioned in the social pages attending dances and balls in the area. For example, in 1866 they were at the Dorset Hunt Ball and in 1867 they were at a fancy dress ball in Bristol. In 1873 the twins were married and they had a double wedding at St Ann's Church Radipole, Dorset. Frederica married Major John George Skene (later Colonel) of the 77th Regiment of Foot who two years later inherited his father's estate called Lethenty in Scotland. Emma married her cousin Edward Alexander Cameron who was a civil engineer and the couple lived in a house called “The Towers” in Buxton, Derbyshire.

When Rev. Edward Bankes died in 1867 his son John Scott Bankes inherited Soughton Hall and made some alterations to the building. He employed John Douglas who refaced the house in red brick, and redesigned the façade. Bankes died in 1894 and his son Sir John Eldon Bankes who was a Judge of the High Court, became the owner of the Hall. He died in 1946 and his son Robert Wynne Bankes inherited the property. When his wife Mabel died in 1985 the property was sold, and it became a boutique hotel and event venue.
