= John Thomson (comedian) =

English comedian, narrator and actor (born 1969)

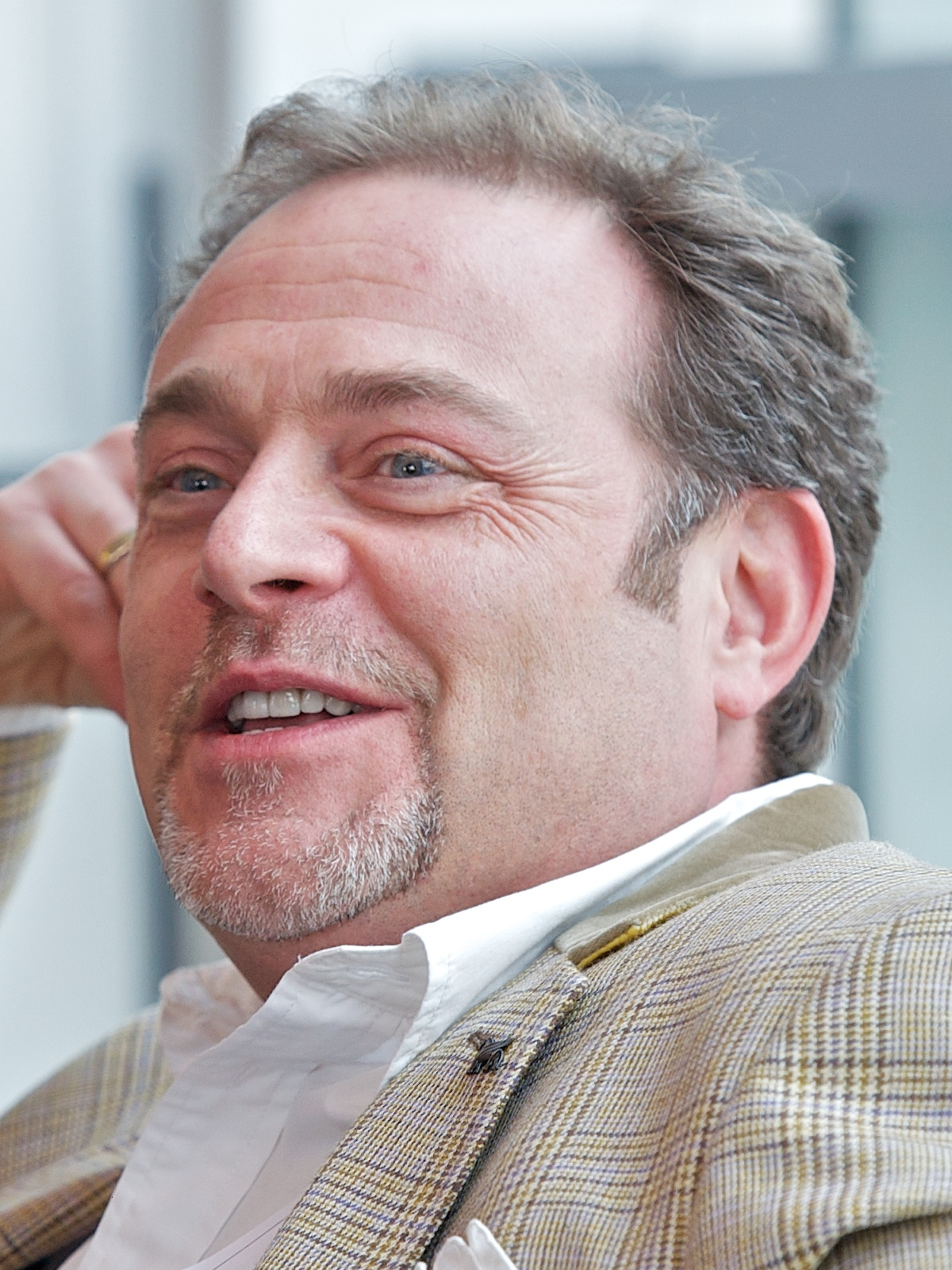
- Thomson in 2013
- Born: Patrick Francis McAleer; 2 April 1969 (age 57); Walkden, Lancashire, England
- Children: 2

Comedy career
- Years active: 1989–present
- Medium: Stand up, television
- Genres: Character comedy, improvisation

John Patrick Thomson (born Patrick Francis McAleer; 2 April 1969) is an English comedian, narrator and actor best known for his roles in The Fast Show, Men Behaving Badly, Cold Feet, 24 Hour Party People, Grimsby and Coronation Street.

== Early life ==
Thomson was born in 1969 in Walkden, Lancashire, to Mary McAleer, who gave him up for adoption six weeks later. He was adopted from the Catholic Children's Rescue Society by Andrew and Marita Thomson, a businessman and a bookseller from Didsbury. He has one younger brother, Ben (born to his adoptive parents). He attended All Hallows Catholic High School near Preston, Lancashire, leaving with three O-levels. He then attended Runshaw College between 1985 and 1987, studying for four A-levels, including theatre studies. He was described as "clearly [having] a talent for comedy".

Following this, he turned down a scholarship in America, to study drama at Manchester Polytechnic instead.

== Career ==
=== Comedy and television ===
While at university, Thomson met Steve Coogan, who secured him a job on Spitting Image. They continued to collaborate on such programmes as The Dead Good Show, a 1993 Granada TV pilot also starring Caroline Aherne, Coogan's Run, the Paul and Pauline Calf video diaries (in which he played Fat Bob) and Knowing Me, Knowing You... with Alan Partridge, for which he also wrote. He also appeared in Coogan's live shows as compère Bernard Righton and the two would be reunited in the 2002 film 24 Hour Party People. The two won the Perrier Comedy Award in 1992 for their act at the Edinburgh Fringe.

Thomson also played supporting roles in the first series of the Stewart Lee and Richard Herring vehicle, Fist of Fun.

In 1994, Thomson appeared in the BBC sketch series The Fast Show, remaining with it until it ended in 2001. Thomson played memorable characters such as Chip Cobb, the deaf stuntman, and Roger Nouveau the football fan, but it is as "Jazz Club" host Louis Balfour that he is most remembered, with the catchphrase, "Nice!" He also appeared in The Fast Show Live and the spin-off Ted and Ralph.

In 1996, he appeared opposite Maureen Lipman as Bob Acres in The Rivals at the Royal Exchange, Manchester.

He made guest appearances on various series such as Coronation Street, Soldier Soldier and Men Behaving Badly in the 1990s before being cast as Pete Gifford in the ITV comedy drama Cold Feet. Thomson was known to the producers, who had previously cast him in a one-off drama called The Perfect Match. A series was commissioned that ran until 2003 and earned him a nomination for Best TV Comedy Actor at the British Comedy Awards 2001. Granada Television filmed a comedy drama called Stan the Man in 2002 in which Thomson starred as Stanley Tully a would-be entrepreneur. Some of the filming was done in south Manchester suburbs.

After Cold Feet wrapped, Thomson appeared in the Royal Exchange's production of Hobson's Choice (helped by his acclaimed performance in The Rivals). The Independent described his performance as Willie as "an extremely well-judged performance. With the slightest physical gesture and merest facial expression he conveys disbelief, reluctance, panic and finally acceptance of his fate at the hands of manipulative Maggie". His performance led to a Manchester Evening News Award nomination for Best Actor in a Leading Role.

That same year he participated in the BBC series Comic Relief does Fame Academy, being the fourth "student" to be "expelled". and in 2004, he appeared in the musical drama Blackpool as Tony Corlette.

He has also lent his voice to the revived BBC children's series Bill and Ben and Mr Windfall in Wallace & Gromit in The Curse of the Were-Rabbit. Another television series, New Street Law, about a Manchester chambers, started in 2006. Thomson plays "lovable rogue" barrister Charlie Darling alongside co-star John Hannah. The second series began in January 2007.

In February 2007, he played Sir Alan Prentice, in Kombat Opera Presents... The Applicants, a spoof opera of the BBC series The Apprentice. The programme attracted 700,000 viewers according to unofficial overnights. In March 2007 he appeared as hypnotherapist Ray Bould in the three-part ITV thriller, Mobile. The producers had Thomson lined up for the role of DI Fleming, but he wanted to read for Bould because he "was up against a friend for the same part". Later that year he filmed a guest appearance as Nigel Pearson in a second series episode of Kingdom. He returned as a full-time cast member for the third series.

In October 2008, Thomson filmed a three-episode guest stint on the ITV soap opera Coronation Street, playing electrician-cum-children's entertainer Jesse, which aired in December. In January 2009, it was announced that he would reprise the role for six months. Jesse returned to Coronation Street in June, beginning a relationship with Eileen Grimshaw (Sue Cleaver). He left 2010, after his contract was not renewed. Later that same year, he portrayed H.V. Kershaw in The Road to Coronation Street, a dramatisation of Coronation Street's development in the 1960s.

In 2011, Thomson joined the cast of the BBC television series Waterloo Road.

Later in 2011, it was announced that Thomson would be appearing next to the original cast (with the exception of Mark Williams) in six online-only episodes of The Fast Show sponsored by lager brand, Foster's due to launch on 10 November 2011.

Also in 2011, John was a contestant on the ITV celebrity reality series 71 Degrees North.

In 2015, he joined the cast of After Hours as loveable Geoff, reuniting with his old friends Craig Cash and Caroline Aherne, who played his wife Sheila. During filming Thomson was attacked by a swan on set, footage being shown on ITV's This Morning.

Thomson was a contestant in the 2013 series of Celebrity MasterChef. Since 2015, Thomson has starred in The Keith Lemon Sketch Show, playing various characters.

He narrates the Channel 4 series Obsessive Compulsive Cleaners and in September 2015, he became the new narrator of Police Interceptors. He stars in the Sky1 comedy drama After Hours, directed by Craig Cash.

From 2016, Thomson began narrating Channel 5 show Bargain-Loving Brits in the Sun - a show about British expats who have moved to Spain to begin a new life in the sun.

On 18 November 2017, Thomson was a contestant in the reboot of The Weakest Link for Children in Need.

In 2018, Thomson was a contestant in Dara O Briain's Go 8 Bit.

In 2019, he starred in the comedy clip show, Zone of Champions.

In 2020, Thomson voiced the character of Dog in the CBeebies show, Dog Loves Books.

In 2021, Thomson participated on the second series of The Masked Singer, masked as Bush Baby. He finished in 8th place.

In December 2022, Thomson landed the role of villain Abanazar in a pantomime production of "Aladdin" at Derby Arena.

In 2024, Thomson appeared as DI Warren Bull in a 2-part episode of Silent Witness called "Grievance Culture".

=== Radio ===
In January 2008, he played Mike (Topaz) in the BBC Radio 4 comedy drama series Pick Ups. On 12 April 2008, Thomson began hosting the Saturday lunchtime slot on BBC Radio Manchester. His stint ended on 22 November 2008.

Since 2016, Thomson has been a team captain on the BBC Radio 4 panel show Gaby's Talking Pictures, presented by Gaby Roslin.

From 26 to 29 December 2023, Thomson presented a four part series for Absolute Radio titled 12 Drummers Drumming, which looked into twelve drummers from the worlds of rock, pop, jazz and rhythm and blues.

== Personal life ==
Thomson has two daughters.

== Filmography ==
Film

Year	Title	Role	Notes
1995	The Young Poisoner's Handbook	Nathan	
1997	The Man Who Knew Too Little	Dimitri	
1997	The Girl with Brains in Her Feet	Mr. Loughborough	
1998	Up 'n' Under	Stan	
1999	The Flint Street Nativity	Christian Jerrums	
1999	The Comedy Trail: A Shaggy Dog Story	Louis Balfour	TV special
2002	24 Hour Party People	Charles	
2005	Wallace & Gromit: The Curse of the Were-Rabbit	Mr. Windfall (voice)	
2008	Inkheart	Darius	
2016	Grimsby	Bob Tolliver	
2025	Fackham Hall	Bill	

Television

Year	Title	Role	Notes
1990	Spitting Image	Various characters (voices)	
1990, 2008–2010, 2024	Coronation Street	Gary (1990)	
1990, 2008–2010, 2024	Coronation Street	Jesse Chadwick (2008–2010, 2024)	
1994	Knowing Me, Knowing You...with Alan Partridge	Various characters	
1994–2001	The Fast Show	Various characters	
1995	Fist of Fun	Various characters	
1995–1997	Crapston Villas	Various characters	
1996	Men Behaving Badly	Ken	
1997–2003, 2016–2020	Cold Feet	Pete Gifford	
1998-2000	Playing the Field	Eddie Ryan	
2001–2002	Bill and Ben	Bill, Slowcoach, Whoops, Tad & Narrator (voices)	
2004	Blackpool	Terry Corlette	
2005	John Thomson's RedHotPoker	Presenter	
2005–2010	Fifi and the Flowertots	Diggly	
2007–2009	Kingdom	Nigel Pearson	
2008	Skins	Sam Brooks	
2009	Big Top	Plonky the Clown/Uncle Geoff	
2011	Death in Paradise	DI Chris Ricketts	1 episode
2011	71 Degrees North	Participant	
2011, 2013	Waterloo Road	Nelson Smith	
2013	Celebrity MasterChef	Contestant	
2013	Dementamania	Mikey Moran	
2013–2014	Strange Hill High	Various characters (voices)	
2013–	Obsessive Compulsive Cleaners	Narrator	
2015	After Hours	Geoff	
2015	Casualty	Dave Barratt	1 episode
2015	The Job Lot	Kevin	1 episode
2015–2016	Obsessive Compulsive Country House Cleaners	Narrator	
2015–2016	The Keith Lemon Sketch Show	Various characters	
2015–	Police Interceptors	Narrator	
2015–	You Saw Them Here First	Narrator	
2015–	Scream Street	Various characters (voices)	
2016	Billionaire Boy	Len	One-off TV special
2016	The Saturday Show	Guest co-presenter	1 episode
2016	Comedy Playhouse: Stop/Start	Evan	1 episode
2016	Bargain Shop Wars	Narrator	
2016	Celebrity Haunted Hotel Live	Participant	
2016	The Moonstone	Sergeant Cuff	
2016-2022	Bargain Loving Brits in the Sun	Narrator	67 episodes
2017	Trollied	Tim/Tom	
2018	Go 8 Bit	Contestant	
2018	Shane The Chef	JG (voice)	
2019	Zone of Champions	Jack Bullman	Main role
2019	A Confession	Ray	Episode 1
2019	Plebs	Mr. Adolphus	Episode: "The Paedos"
2019, 2022	Richard Osman's House of Games	Himself (participant)	10 episodes, including House of Champions
2020	Dog Loves Books	Dog (voice)	Main role
2020	Brassic	Colin Popov	2 episodes
2021-2022	Bargain Loving Brits by the Sea	Narrator	12 episodes
2021, 2022	The Masked Singer	Bush Baby	Series 2, Guest appearance in I’m A Celeb Special 2022
2021	McDonald & Dodds	Jimmy Daly	Episode: "We Need to Talk About Doreen"
2021	Midsomer Murders	Cooper Steinem	Episode: "The Stitcher Society"
2021	This Time with Alan Partridge	Joe Beasley	Season 2 Episode 2
2022	Father Brown	John Banks	Episode: "The Requiem for the Dead"
2022	Deep Heat	Enrique	Episode: "The Panther"
2022	Dodger	Farmer Grundles	2 episodes
2022	Professor T.	Steve Sanderson	Episode: "DNA of a Murderer"
2023	Sister Boniface Mysteries	Leonard Monk	Episode: "Stiff Competition"
2024	Silent Witness	DI Warren Bull	2 episodes
2024	Too Good to Be True	Geoff	Episode 1
2024	The Gentlemen	Frank	Episode: "An Unsympathetic Gentleman"
2024	Odd Squad	Bubbly Bob	Episode: "Villain of the Year"
2025	Art Detectives	William Titchfield	Episode: "Dead & Buried"
2025	The Madame Blanc Mysteries	George Alfonse	Episode: "Christmas Special 2025"
2026	Break Clause	Alan	4 episodes
