= Church of St Eurgain and St Peter =

Church in Northop, Flintshire, Wales

- Northop Parish Church
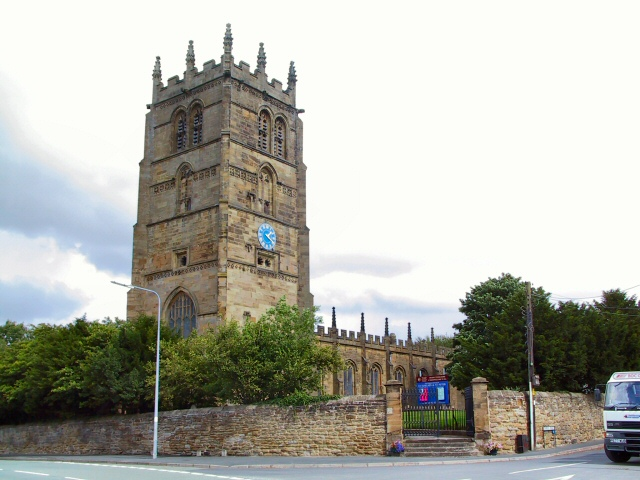
- The church and its tower from Northop Road.
- Church of St Eurgain and St Peter
- 53.2081°N 3.12985°W
- Location: Northop, Flintshire
- Country: Wales
- Denomination: Church in Wales
- Website: www.northopchurch.co.uk

History
- Dedication: Eurgain and Peter

Architecture
- Architectural type: Perpendicular

Administration
- Diocese: Diocese of St Asaph

Listed Building – Grade I
- Official name: Church of St Eurgain and St Peter
- Designated: 11 June 1962; Amended 15 August 2001
- Reference no.: 321

The Church of St Eurgain and St Peter (also known as Northop Parish Church; or the Church of Ss Eurgain and Peter) is a parish church located in Northop, Flintshire, Wales. It is a Grade I listed building. The Church in Wales church was first documented in the 13th century, with its tower likely dating to the early 16th century.

== Background and history ==
The building is located prominently on the corner of Church Road and Northop Road, in Northop, Flintshire. It is part of the Diocese of St Asaph.

It was originally solely dedicated to the mid 6th century Saint Eurgain, a niece of Saint Asaph. Eurgain's name is present in the Welsh name for Northop, Llaneurgain, the llan (enclosure) of St Eurgain. Some state the church itself was reputedly founded by the saint in the mid-6th century, however the current church is unlikely to be from the early medieval period.

The first documentation of the church was in 1254 and later in 1291. During which the church was located on the site which is now the location of its north aisle. In the 13th century, it was believed to have only consisted of a single chamber. In the 14th century, it was extended east, when a crypt was constructed in its new sanctuary. Its eastern arcade's end arch and two corbels in the nave were also of this age.

The church underwent a substantial expansion in the 15th and 16th centuries, under the guidance of the Stanley family. During the expansion, a new Perpendicular nave and chancel were added to its southern end, with a simple arcade also added. The church's Perpendicular and battlemented tower is said to have had the date 1571 inscribed on a gargoyle of the tower, although the tower is likely to be dated from the early 16th century.

From 1839 to 1840, the church was remodelled to be more Perpendicular by Chester architect and County surveyor of Flintshire, Thomas Jones. This followed reports that the church's structure had become unsafe, and in a poor state in need of repairs, by the 18th century. During the remodelling, the church was shortened, with its arcade reduced from seven to five bays. The outer walls of the nave, chancel and aisle were rebuilt, and the tower had a plaster vaulted ceiling inserted into it.

In 1850, the eastern wall was rebuilt, with the insertion of a new Geometrical window. These works were done in memory of Reverend Henry Jones, and by William Butterfield. In 1876 and 1877, the church underwent a further restoration by Chester architect, John Douglas, who added new furnishings to the building, box pews, and removed the western gallery. In the 1870s, Hardman & Co, painted and enriched the reredos and altar.

Various stained glass in the church dates to the 19th to early 20th centuries. In 1965, the western doorway was renewed.

== Structure ==
The Grade I listed building is in the Perpendicular style, and contains a western tower, north aisle, and a nave and chancel as one. The north aisle may be also described as a nave, therefore describing the building as a double-nave structure. It also has a five-bay arcade that connects to the north aisle.

The tower is of fine-coursed sandstone ashlar, with five stages. It is located at the western end of the south (main) nave. Its western side contains the main entrance to the church, located within a renewed Tudor-arched doorway.

The chancel, north aisle and nave were all remodelled in the 19th century and are now of snecked pecked sandstone. The aisle is gabled, and is lower and narrower than the nave, although of the same length. The nave and chancel contain six bays between them.

Its western door has the Tudor rose and the heraldic badges of the Beaufort and Stanley families carved into stone by it.

The church's early churchyard was rectangular. It was enlarged in 1837, 1866 and in the early 20th century. The latter extension extended it with a burial ground in the grounds' north-eastern corner. It was further extended in 1911 (marked with a wall datestone) when it passed beyond an old Grammar School. It was further expanded north-east in the 1920s.

== See also ==
- List of churches in Flintshire
- Grade I listed buildings in Flintshire
