= Pantymwyn =

Village in Flintshire, Wales

Coordinates: 53.172°N 3.206°W

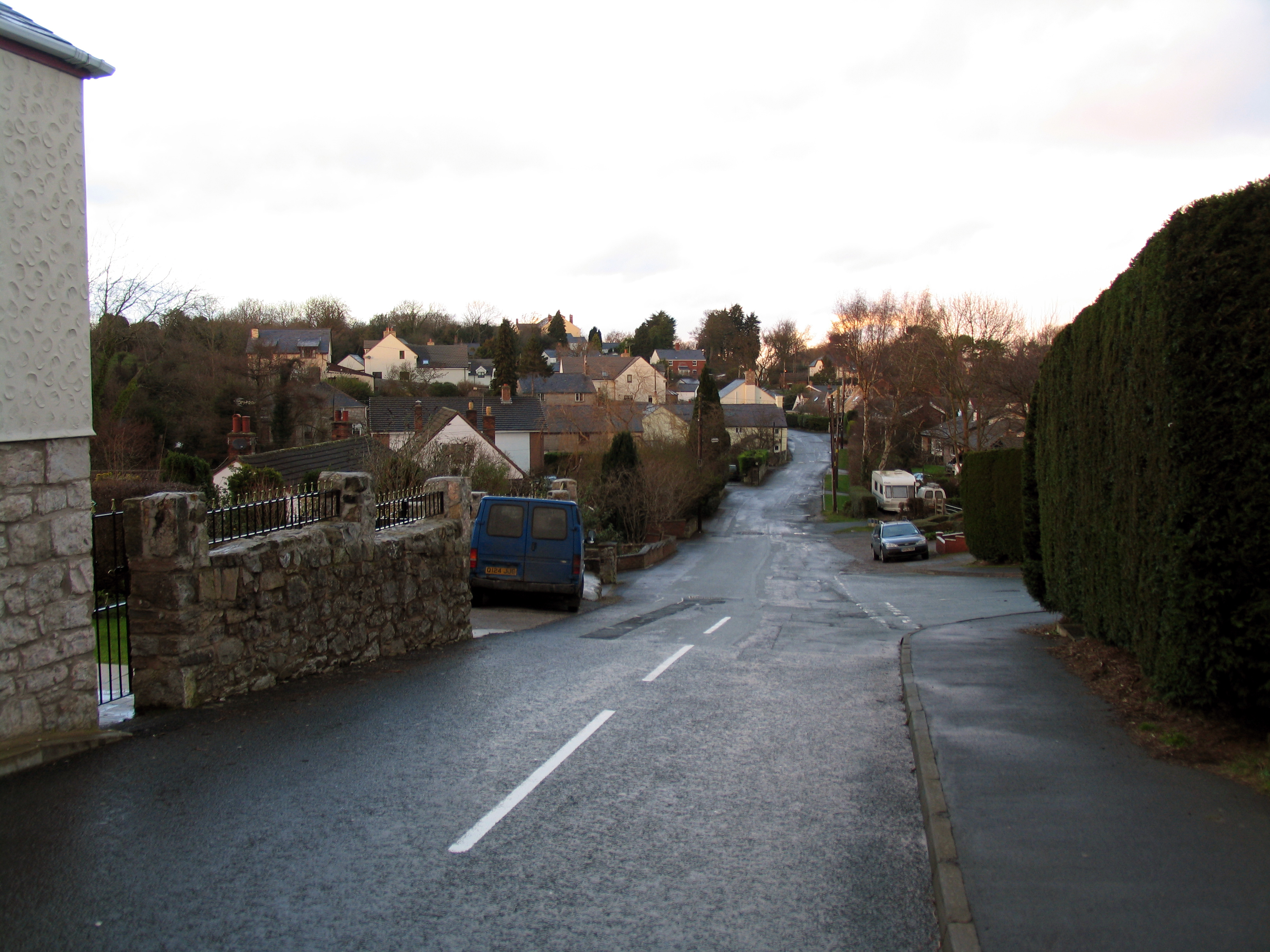
- Pen-y-Fron Road, Pantymwyn

- Location within Flintshire
- Population: 829
- OS grid reference: SJ193646
- Community: Gwernaffield with Pantymwyn
- Principal area: Flintshire
- Preserved county: Clwyd
- Country: Wales
- Sovereign state: United Kingdom
- Post town: MOLD
- Postcode district: CH7
- Dialling code: 01352
- Police: North Wales
- Fire: North Wales
- Ambulance: Welsh
- UK Parliament: Clwyd East
- Senedd Cymru – Welsh Parliament: Delyn

Pantymwyn is a small village just outside Mold in Flintshire, Wales, in the community of Gwernaffield with Pantymwyn.

The village is located within the designated Clwydian Range and Dee Valley Area of Outstanding Natural Beauty, lying on the east side of the Clwydian Range. Pantymwyn is four miles west of Mold and 16 miles west of Chester.

The village has a pub (the Crown Inn), a post office and convenience store, a garage and an 18-hole uplands golf course (the home of Mold Golf Club). During the summer, Pantymwyn holds an annual village fair. Pantymwyn adjoins Gwernaffield, the population of Pantymwyn itself is around 800 with most people born in England.

Access to the Loggerheads country park is within short walking distance, as are many walks over the Clwydian Range of mountains. The village is often visited by walkers and cyclists.

The area has a history involving lead mining and limestone quarrying.

== Transport ==
Townlynx operate the only public bus service in Pantymwyn. Route 6, which starts at the village and continues onto Mold and Chester.

GHA Coaches provide a student service to Yale College, Wrexham.

== History ==
Lead Mining may have begun during Roman times, although it wouldn't be until the 1660s, when the price of lead began increasing, that mining began being considered by the local land owners. Mining grew with the industrial revolution as technological improvements and demand increased. John Taylor, a renowned mining engineer, owned several of the mines between 1823 and 1845, and invested large sums of money into them to build water channels and water pumps. The effect these had could be seen in the 7000 tons of lead mined between 1823 and 1845. Devil's Gorge, to the west of Pantymwyn, is the result of mining through White Spar. Despite the large mining and some success, the mines often lost money, with most mining remaining speculative. Beyond 1860 and into the 20th century tunneling was stopped several times as lead prices fluctuated. The Pantybuarth continued to be mined into the 1970s, making it the last lead vein to be mined in Wales.

Limestone quarrying is also carried out in the area, with several quarries being marked on an 1871 map. Quarrying has gradually declined in the area, although it does continue.

== Notable residents ==
Coldplay guitarist Jonny Buckland moved to Pantymwyn in 1981 as a child, and attended the Ysgol y Waun school.
