= Obsessive Compulsive Cleaners =

British television series (2013–2016)

- Narrated by: John Thomson
- No. of series: 5

Original release
- Network: Channel 4
- Release: February 2013 – April 2016

Obsessive Compulsive Cleaners is a Channel 4 television series about people with obsessive–compulsive disorder, narrated by John Thomson.

The first series ran from February to March 2013, the second from October to December 2013, the third from October to December 2014, the fourth from September to October 2015, and the fifth from March to April 2016.

A three-part special called Obsessive Compulsive Cleaners: Country House Rescue aired in June to July 2015. This mini-series features featured places such as Forcett Hall, Tarbert House, Top-y-Fron Hall and Plas Teg.

The programme was made by independent production company Betty.

== Controversy ==
The British charity OCD Action has noted that many people have contacted them about the show: "For the most part, people have been upset and frustrated about the way in which the programme portrays OCD. We share this frustration."

Another British charity OCD-UK also spoke out against the show: "OCD-UK felt the only message delivered by this programme was to add to the misconceptions, confusion and misunderstanding the general viewing audience have about what OCD is, and what OCD isn't, further adding to the stigma that those with this insidious illness feel. [...] OCD should never be promoted as entertainment value, it is a serious disabling illness, and those that battle the anxiety of OCD on a daily basis deserve far more respect than Channel 4 is affording them with such programmes."

== Reception ==
Christopher Howse, writing for The Daily Telegraph, pilloried the show, writing: "Mindless rubbish has its place in the schedules, but I can't lighten up or chillax in the face of this gruesome farrago. Voluntarily watching Obsessive Compulsive Cleaners is a hate crime if there ever was one, and I wish doing so attracted stern penalties."
