= St Mary's Church, Northop Hall =

Church in Flintshire, Wales

Coordinates: 53.2024°N 3.0946°W

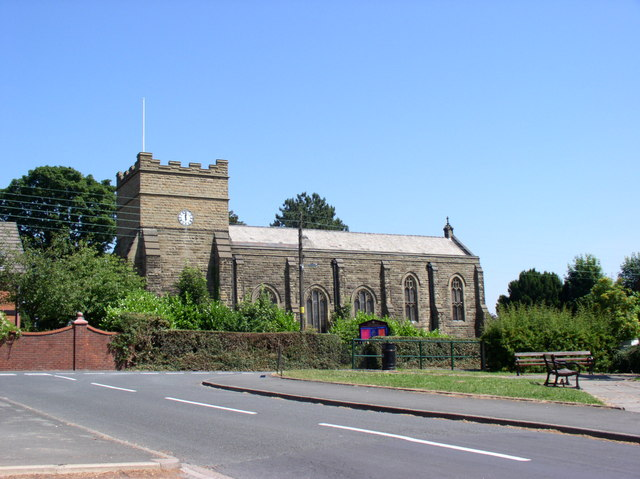
St Mary's, Northop Hall

St Mary's Church, Northop Hall is a redundant church within the village of Northop Hall, Flintshire, North Wales.

The church was built 1911–12 of a design by L.W. Barnard of Cheltenham, a prolific architect. The original design was to include a tower, but this was never fully built. A rather abbreviated top was only added in 1962.

Of particular note are the barrel ceiling and the organ which is of outstanding quality. The instrument was built in 1931 by Messrs. Rushworth & Dreaper, Liverpool, and the opening recital was given by Dr. Middleton, then organist at Chester Cathedral. By utilising the church's reverberant acoustics, the organ's power is perfectly matched to the building into which it has been installed. To mark the 75th anniversary of its construction, well-attended organ recitals were given in 2006. The choristers of St. Asaph Cathedral also sang evensong in the church that year, accompanied by John Hosking on the organ.

The church is now redundant following closure in 2019. It is currently for sale and likely to be either maintained or demolished due to it not being a listed building.
