= Northop Hall Country House Hotel =

Hotel in Flintshire, Wales

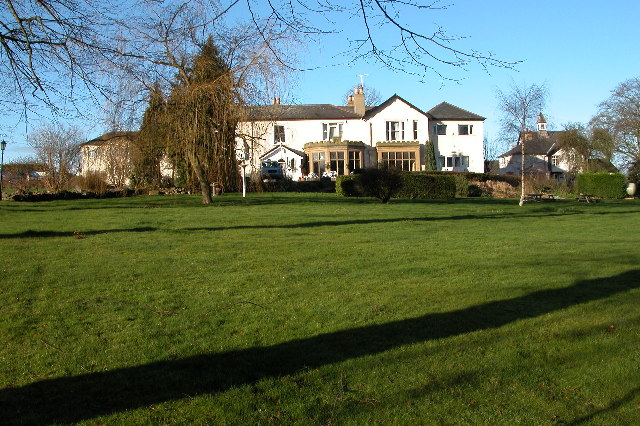
- The hotel

- Location within Flintshire

General information
- Location: Northop Hall, Flintshire, Wales
- Coordinates: 53°12′2″N 3°5′34″W
- Owner: Paymán Holdings 3 Ltd

Other information
- Number of rooms: 38
- Number of restaurants: 1

Website
- https://northophallhotel.com/

Northop Hall Country House Hotel (Formerly Known as Brook Park) is country house, now run as a hotel in Flintshire, just south of Northop Hall, northeastern Wales. The estate is set in 9 acres with a tree-lined driveway. It was originally occupied by the Watkinson family, a Yorkshire mining and landowning family, originally from Lightcliffe.

John Watkinson, the original owner of the house, came to the area from Lightcliffe, West Yorkshire, to manage the family's Welsh mining interests.

After his death, it passed down to his daughter Marian Kershaw nee Watkinson, who died in 1912, then the house was inhabited by Herbert Kershaw, a relative and barrister, who moved to the house to take care of his nieces and nephew. After Herbert died in 1949, the house was passed to his nephew Arthur, who had by this time moved to Australia to play cricket, had the contents of the house moved to New South Wales, and eventually sold the property in the 1950s.

In the 1960s the house had been transformed into the Checkpoint Country Club, being a very fashionable venue until the late 1970s, when it became the Chequers Hotel, and finally Northop Hall Country House Hotel by the 1990s.

The country house was built in 1872. The interior is elegant, with an original Canadian pine staircase, 38 bedrooms, and two conference style rooms, including the Gallery and Library Rooms.

In 2020, during the COVID-19 pandemic, the hotel was left derelict. It was purchased by Paymán Holdings 3 Ltd director Na'ím Anís Paymán in 2022 and had reopened to guests by August 2023.

A planning application was submitted to house 400 asylum seekers on the site. Flintshire County Council rejected the application in September 2023.

As of February 2026, it operates as a hotel offering bed and breakfast accommodation.
