= St Michael's Church, Trelawnyd =

- St Michael and All Angels Church
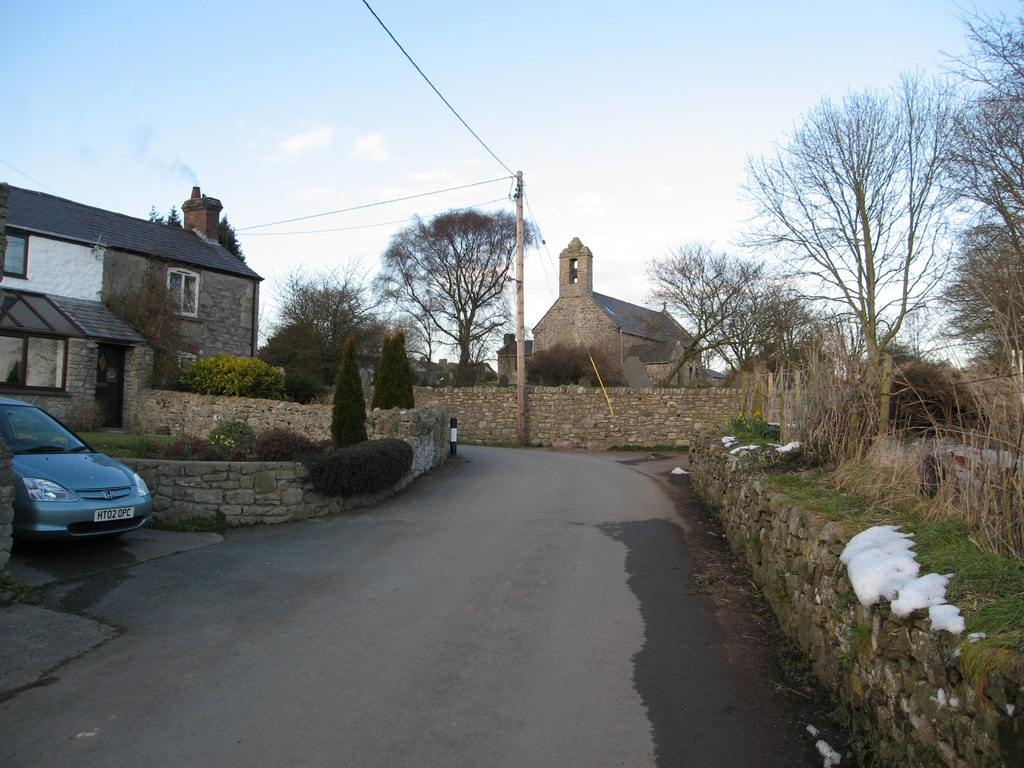
- St Michael's Church, Trelawnyd
- 53.3058°N 3.3686°W
- Location: Trelawnyd, Flintshire
- Country: Wales
- Denomination: Anglican

History
- Status: Parish church
- Dedication: St Michael and All Angels

Architecture
- Functional status: Closed
- Heritage designation: Grade II*
- Designated: 6 November 1962
- Architect(s): Douglas and Fordham, Douglas, Minshall and Muspratt (Restorations)
- Architectural type: Church
- Style: Gothic, Gothic Revival
- Groundbreaking: 1724
- Completed: 1917
- Closed: March 2022

Specifications
- Length: 55 feet (17 m)
- Width: 19 feet (6 m)
- Materials: Limestone with sandstone dressings Slate roof with stone ridge tiles

Administration
- Province: Church in Wales
- Diocese: St Asaph
- Archdeaconry: St Asaph
- Deanery: St Asaph
- Parish: Trelawnyd

Clergy
- Vicar: Rev Canon R. W. Rowland

St Michael's Church, Trelawnyd, is in the village of Trelawnyd, Flintshire, Wales. Former Anglican parish church. Previously in the benefice of Dyserth and Trelawnyd and Cwm, the deanery of St Asaph, the archdeaconry of St Asaph, and the diocese of St Asaph. The church is designated by Cadw as a Grade II* listed building.

== History ==
The first documentary reference to the church is in 1291 but the present church was not built until 1724. During a restoration in 1863 a gallery was added to the west end, the roof was re-slated and the walls were plastered. In 1895–97 a major restoration was carried out by the Chester firm of Douglas and Fordham when the plaster and the gallery were removed, and a new east window was installed. The other windows were replaced, and a new pulpit, lectern and pews were added. The arch of the porch was replaced, a stone cross was added to the east gable and the bell turret was remodelled. In 1917 a vestry was added to the north side of the church by the same firm of architects, now known as Douglas, Minshall and Muspratt.

== Architecture ==
=== Structure ===
The church is built in limestone with sandstone dressings. The roof is of slate with stone ridge tiles. Its plan consists of a nave and chancel in one chamber, a south porch, a north vestry and a bellcote with a single bell at the west.

=== Fittings and furniture ===
In the vestry is a 14th-century sepulchral slab, which is set upside-down. The stained glass in the east window is by Hemming and dates from 1897. A window in the north wall was dedicated on Ascension Day 1930. A pair of windows in the chancel, made by Shrigley and Hunt, was dedicated in 1969. The octagonal font consists of a medieval bowl set in a modern base. The oak cover dates was added in 1968. The lectern was given in 1899, the altar in 1929, and the pulpit was bought from Kinmel School in 1936. The organ, built by the Positive Organ Company, was installed in 1920 and electrified in 1951–52.

== External features ==
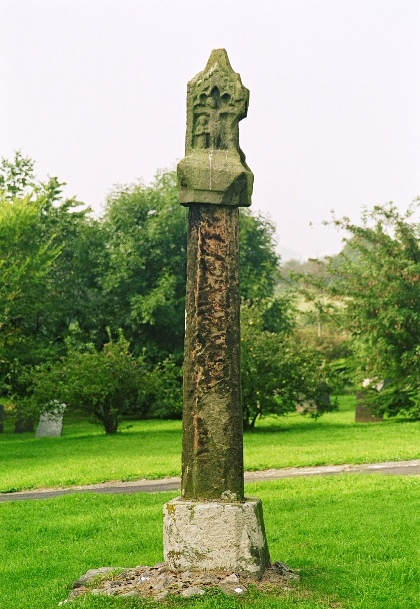
Churchyard cross

In the churchyard is a preaching cross dating from the 14th century which is a scheduled ancient monument. A square plinth is set on a circular concrete base. In this is set a sandstone chamfered shaft, rectangular in cross-section, which is about 3.5m high. On the head are cinquefoil panels, those on the east and west sides containing depictions of the Crucifixion. Also in the churchyard are four structures listed at Grade II. To the south of the porch of the church is a sundial dated 1768. It consists of a baluster on a circular plinth carrying a circular table with an octagonal brass sundial. To the west of the tower is an 18th-century monument in Baroque style marking the site of the Nerquis Hall vault. It is in white marble and consists of an altar-tomb on a plinth, with memorial plaques. On the top is a sarcophagus decorated with gadrooning, and with a ball finial. Also in the churchyard is a former 19th-century bier-house. It is built in stone and brick and has a corrugated iron roof. The building is in a single storey, and has a doorway and two ventilation slits, now blocked. The churchyard gates and walls are also listed. The gate piers are simple and in sandstone with conical caps. The gates are in wrought iron and decorated with fleur-de-lis and arrow motifs. There is also a smaller pedestrian gateway in similar style.

== See also ==
- List of church restorations, amendments and furniture by John Douglas
