= William Wynne (judge) =

English judge and academic

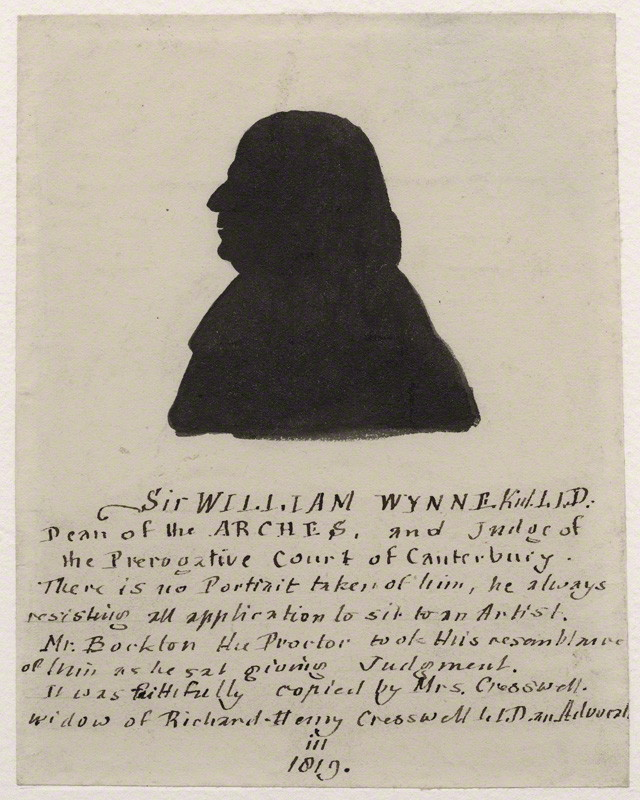
Sir William Wynne, posthumous silhouette

Sir William Wynne (1729–1815) was an English judge and academic, Dean of the Arches 1788 to 1809, and Master of Trinity Hall, Cambridge from 1803.

== Life ==
The son of John Wynne and his wife Anne Pugh, he matriculated at Trinity Hall, Cambridge in 1747, graduating LL.B. in 1752, LL.D. in 1757. He became a Fellow of the college in 1755.

Wynne was admitted as an advocate of the Court of Arches in 1757, where his practice was largely on marriage and probate matters. He contested unsuccessfully the 1764 election for the Master of his college, losing out to Sir James Marriott. In 1788 he was knighted and became Dean of the Arches. In 1803 he was elected Master, and made improvements in the College. He was elected a Fellow of the Royal Society in 1794.
