= Northop Hall =

Village and community in Flintshire, Wales

Northop Hall: Welsh: Pentre-moch
- Village and community
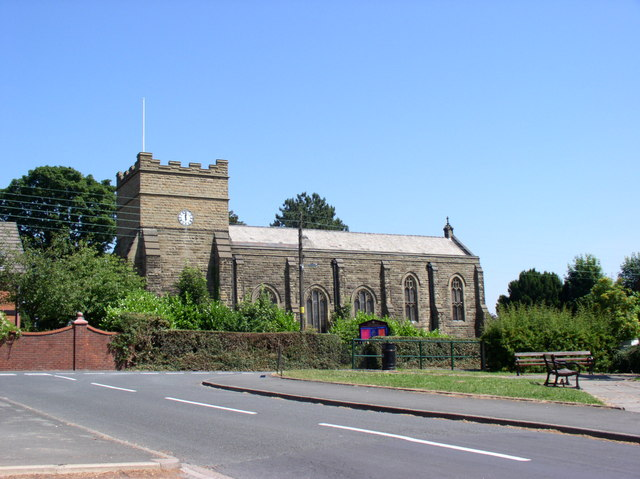
- St. Mary's Church, Northop Hall

- Location within Flintshire
- Population: 1,530 (2011 Census)
- OS grid reference: SJ275677
- Principal area: Flintshire
- Preserved county: Clwyd
- Country: Wales
- Sovereign state: United Kingdom
- Post town: MOLD
- Postcode district: CH7
- Dialling code: 01244
- Police: North Wales
- Fire: North Wales
- Ambulance: Welsh
- UK Parliament: Clwyd East
- Senedd Cymru – Welsh Parliament: Delyn
- Website: Council website
- List of places UK Wales Flintshire 53.201°N 3.086°W Map of the community

Northop Hall (Welsh: Pentre-moch, lit. 'pigs village') is a village and community near Connah's Quay in Flintshire, Wales. Located to the east of Northop, near the A55 North Wales Expressway, the village is largely residential in character. At the 2001 Census, the village of Northop Hall had a population of 1,665, falling to 1,530 at the 2011 census.

The village has one pub, The Top Monkey (formerly known as The Boar's Head); until recently there was a second, the Black Lion, and they were universally known locally as the 'Top Monkey' and 'Bottom Monkey'. There are active cricket and hockey clubs.

The hall that gives the village its name is a 13th-century manor house which is located in close proximity to Smithy Lane and the Mold to Connah's Quay road. It was the most important house in Northop parish. It was occupied by local aristocracy including the Evans family, ancestors of author George Eliot. The original Northop Hall is now a private house and not to be confused with Northop Hall Country House Hotel which is Victorian and located elsewhere in the village.

It previously had no recognised Welsh name. In April 2025, Pentre-moch (Welsh for 'pigs village') was proposed by the community council for use as its Welsh name, which was commonly used in Welsh during the 17th–19th centuries. It refers to a 13th century farm located near the Northop Hall manor, which in turn gives the settlement its English name. Neuadd Llaneurgain, a direct translation of the English name, has also been proposed and had also received local support. In July 2026, Pentre-moch was approved by the council as the place's Welsh name, with permission granted in September 2026.

== Landmarks ==
- St Mary's Church, Northop Hall
- Northop Hall Country House Hotel
- Northop Hall Girls F.C.
- Northop Hall Cricket Club Ground
