= Rhydyn Hall =

- Location within Flintshire
- 53.1067°N 3.0310°W
- Type: House
- Location: Flintshire, Wales
- OS grid reference: SJ 3107 5710

History
- Built: early 18th century

Listed Building – Grade II*
- Official name: Rhydyn Hall
- Designated: 7 February 1962
- Reference no.: 34
- Community: Hope

Rhydyn Hall (or Rhyddyn Hall), near Caergwrle in Flintshire, Wales, is an 18th-century building with two storeys with a later wing to the north-west. It has a slate roof, Doric porch and iron verandahs, and was designated a Grade II* listed building in 1962 as a good example of an early 18th century gentry house with good surviving interior detail.

Following a partial fire, the decorators left graffiti dated July 18, 1839 to record the completion of the work for the owner Richard Golightly. Some minor remodelling was carried out around 1900 when the Hall was developed into a spa and hotel.
