= Cyllin =

Legendary 1st-century AD British chieftain

Cyllin was a legendary, and possibly historical British king of the 1st century AD, early Christian saint and the last pendragon of Great Britain. His existence is based on very limited evidence. Richard Williams Morgan claimed that a reference to him as a son of Caratacus was found in the family records of Iestyn ab Gwrgant and used this as evidence of early entry of Christianity to Britain;

Cyllin ab Caradog, a wise and just king. In his days many of the Cymry embraced the faith in Christ through the teaching of the saints of Cor-Eurgain, and many godly men from the countries of Greece and Rome were in Cambria. He first of the Cymry gave infants names; for before, names were not given except to adults, and then from something characteristic in their bodies, minds, or manners.

Reference to Cyllin is also given in Iolo Morganwg's "Third series" of forged Welsh Triads. He is also discussed in the works of Rice Rees, Jane Williams, Sabine Baring-Gould and John Williams (Ab Ithel) as brother of Saint Eigen and father of King Coel. He is also noted in a manuscript giving the genealogy of Taliesin from the collection of Thomas Hopkin of Coychurch along with one from the Havod Uchtryd collection where he is called Cynan, a name often associated with Conan Meriadoc.

Preceded by Caratacus	King of Siluria	Succeeded by --
