= Northop =

Village and community in Flintshire, Wales

Northop: Welsh: Llaneurgain
- Village and community
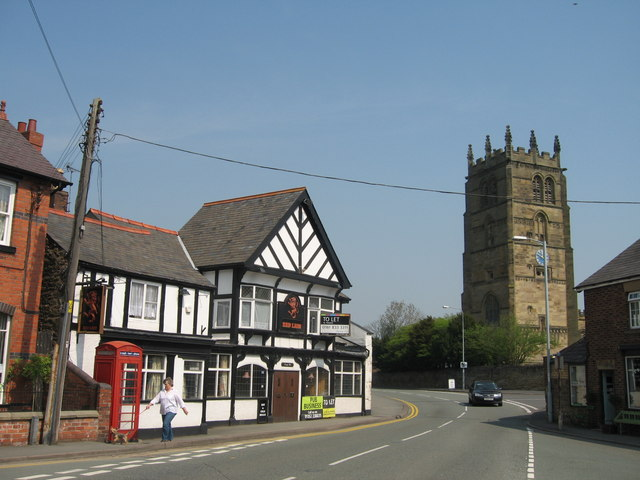
- St Eurgain and St Peter's Church and The Red Lion

- Location within Flintshire
- Population: 3,049 (2011 Census)
- OS grid reference: SJ246681
- Principal area: Flintshire
- Preserved county: Clwyd
- Country: Wales
- Sovereign state: United Kingdom
- Post town: MOLD
- Postcode district: CH7
- Dialling code: 01352
- Police: North Wales
- Fire: North Wales
- Ambulance: Welsh
- UK Parliament: Clwyd East
- Senedd Cymru – Welsh Parliament: Clwyd
- Website: northopcc.org.uk
- List of places UK Wales Flintshire 53.204°N 3.130°W Map of the community

Northop (Welsh: Llaneurgain) is a village, community and electoral ward situated in Flintshire, Wales, approximately 12 miles west of the city of Chester, midway between Mold and Flint, and situated just off junction 33 of the A55 North Wales Expressway. At the 2001 Census, the population of Northop was 2,983, increasing to 3,049 at the 2011 census. The community includes Sychdyn.

The village is home to two pubs, a cricket club, and a golf course. At the centre of the village stands the church of St Eurgain and St Peter, towering 98 feet above the village. Northop College based in Northop, offering horticultural courses for students of all ages, in areas such as Animal Care, floristry, Horse Care, Horticulture and agricultural machinery. Wrexham University has a campus based in Northop; this is the university's home for land-based and rural education, and a centre for courses on animal studies and biodiversity.

== Toponymy ==
The English name seems to be derived from North Hope, to distinguish it from the nearby village of Hope, which has also been known as East Hoped. Another source claims the name originates from North and Thorpe, the latter word meaning village or town in the Saxon language. Written in ancient records as Northorpe, the name Northop was in use after the surrender of Chester to Egbert of Wessex, circa AD 828, when Flintshire was brought under Saxon rule.

The Welsh placename for Northop, Llaneurgain translates as 'the holy enclosure of Eurgain'. It refers to Eurgain, a niece of Saint Asaph, and the local church, the Church of St Eurgain and St Peter, commemorates her.

== St Eurgain and St Peter's Church ==
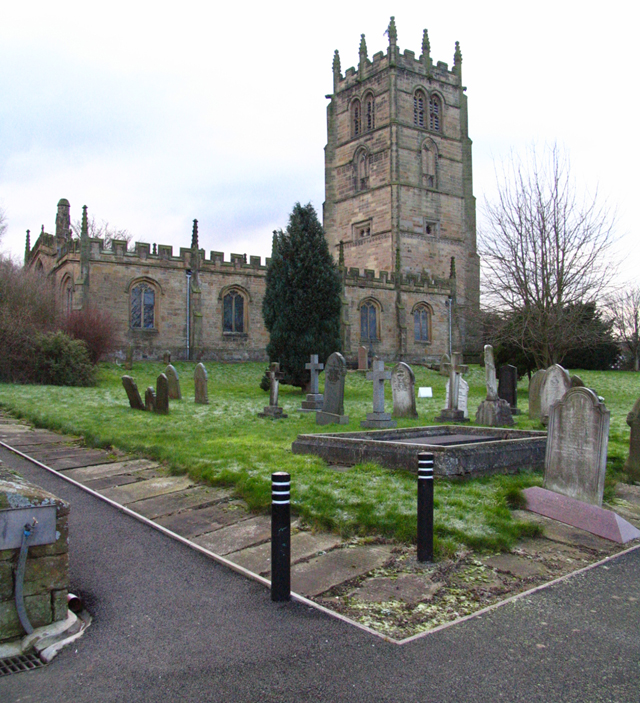
St Eurgain and St Peter

There has been evidence of a church in Northop since the 6th century. It is said that Eurgain, a niece of Saint Asaph, passed through Northop and founded the church here on a Celtic mound, upon which it still stands. Records indicate that there was a stone church erected here during the 12th century, with the tower being completed to its 98-foot height in 1571. The present building was extensively rebuilt during 1840, with further alterations being carried out in 1877.

The churchyard of St Eurgain and St Peter still houses the old grammar school for Northop, constructed during the 16th century.

St Eurgain and St Peter's church is the seat of the Parish of Northop, which comprises the districts of Northop, Northop Hall, Sychdyn, Halkyn, Rhosesmor, and Flint Mountain. Formerly it also included Connah's Quay. It is a member of the diocese of St Asaph, Church in Wales.

The church is a Grade I listed building.

== Present ==
The village shop also incorporates a one-counter post office. There are two pubs, one at either end of the High Street: the Red Lion, and The Boot, the last remaining coaching inn in the village that served the Chester-Holyhead stagecoach route. There is also a hairdresser and an MOT garage.

Northop previously had a larger number of shops and services, but due to retail developments in neighbouring towns these have disappeared, including: butchers; fish and chip shop;tea shop; cobblers; Smithy; and a working men's club.

Northop is also an electoral ward, coterminous with the community. It elects one county councillor to Flintshire County Council.

The community has a community council. In December 2025, the council was renamed from Northop Community Council to Northop and Sychdyn Community Council, to reference the village of Sychdyn.

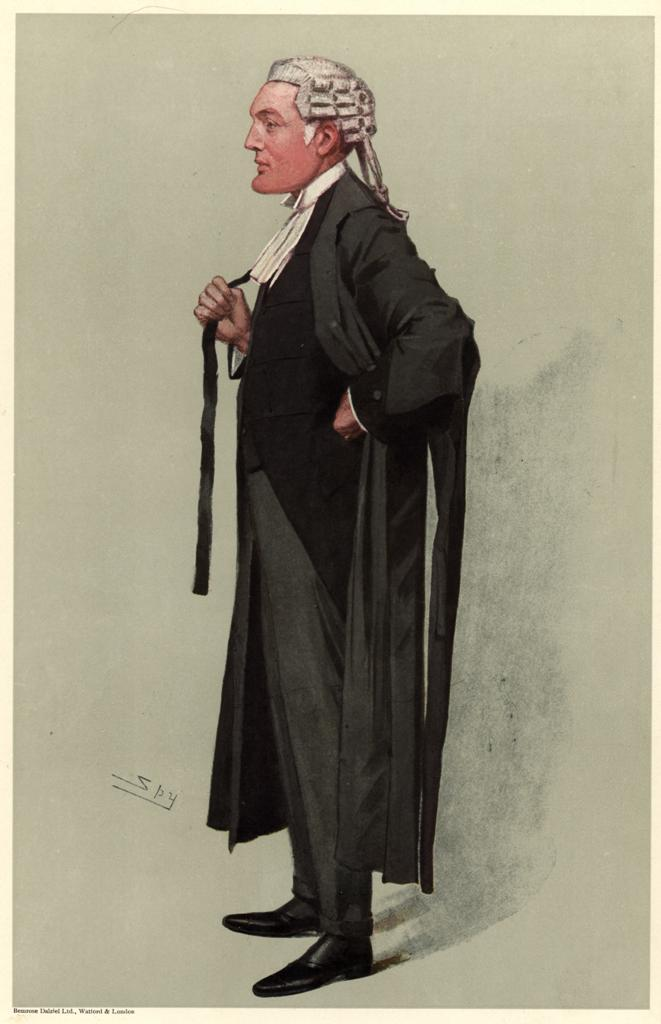
Bankes JE, Vanity Fair, 1906

== Notable people ==
- William Parry (died 1585), courtier and spy, planned to assassinate Elizabeth I and was executed.
- Thomas Edwards (1779–1858), writer and lexicographer.
- Sir John Eldon Bankes (1854–1946), judge of the King's Bench Division of the High Court of Justice
- Thomas Bartley (1908 in Northop Hall – 1964), Test match umpire.
- Kerry Peers (born 1964 in Northop Hall), actress, she played Suzi Croft in The Bill
- Rob Roberts (born 1979 Northop Hall), former Member of Parliament (MP) for Delyn

== Northop Silver Band ==
In 1892, a group of young men met at Soughton (now Sychdyn) and committed themselves to playing for a year with the newly formed silver band. Within two years they had relocated to nearby Northop. The bands' first contest success was in 1921 at Flint. The band at that time rehearsed at the Boot Inn which now supplies refreshments after practices.

The band has played at some prestigious venues, including the Liverpool Philharmonic Hall, St. David's Hall, in Cardiff and the Royal Albert Hall in London. The 1980s saw the band become 'international' with a visit to Menden in Germany. Recently band members joined forces with Parc and Dare Band from South Wales in a return visit to Germany to play at a Police Festival in Hamburg.
