= Gwernymynydd =

Village in Flintshire, Wales

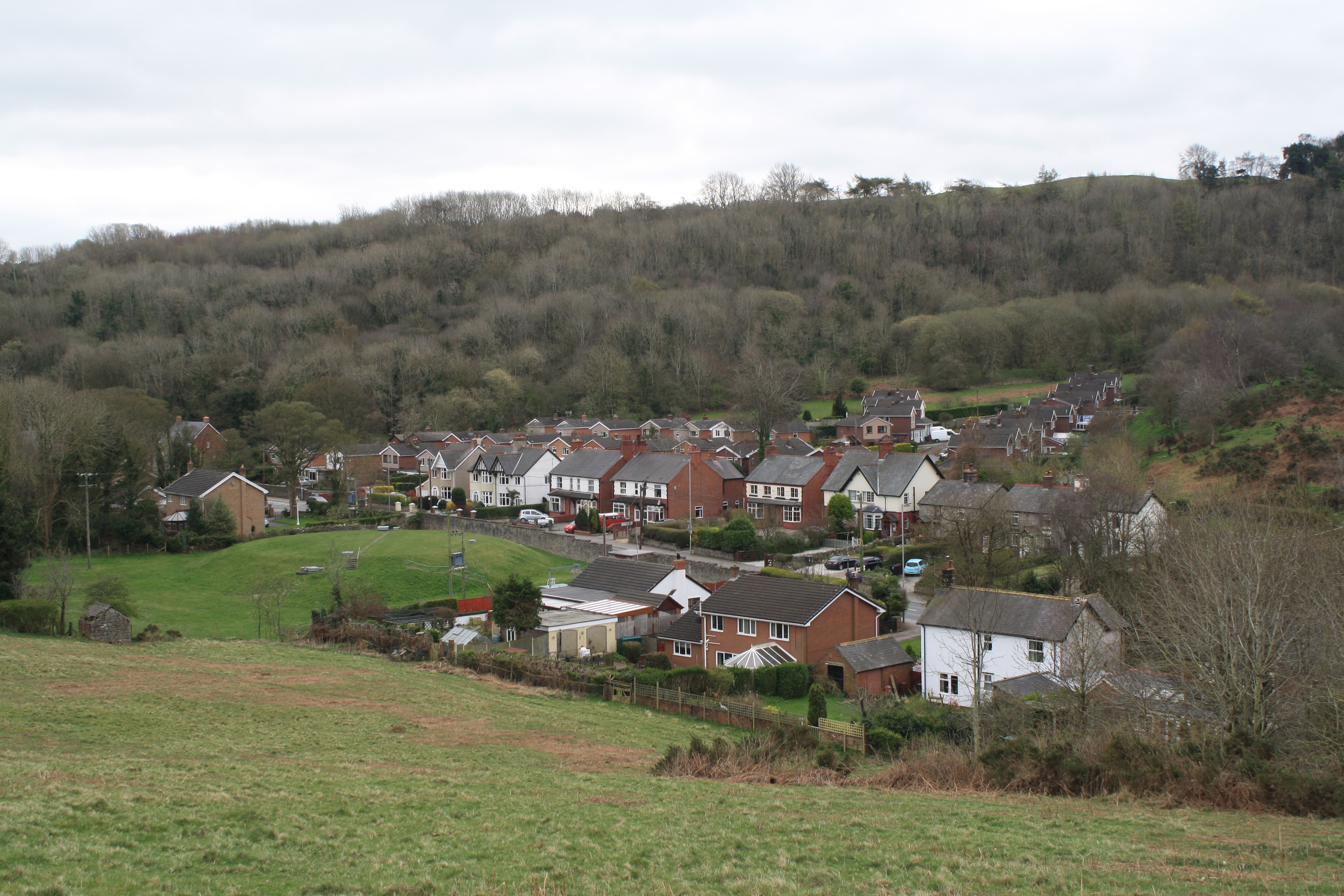
- Overlooking Gwernymynydd

- Location within Flintshire
- Population: 1,082 (2021)
- OS grid reference: SJ217626
- Community: Gwernymynydd and Cadole
- Principal area: Flintshire
- Preserved county: Clwyd
- Country: Wales
- Sovereign state: United Kingdom
- Settlements: Cadole, Gwernymynydd
- Post town: MOLD
- Postcode district: CH7
- Dialling code: 01352
- Police: North Wales
- Fire: North Wales
- Ambulance: Welsh
- UK Parliament: Clwyd East
- Senedd Cymru – Welsh Parliament: Delyn
- Website: Council website
- List of places UK Wales Flintshire 53.155°N 3.171°W Map of the Gwernymynyddand Cadole community

Gwernymynydd (Welsh for 'Alder trees on the mountain') is a village, just outside the market town of Mold, in Flintshire, Wales. It forms part of the Gwernymynydd and Cadole (sometimes shortened to Gwernymynydd) community. At its highest point it is 1000 feet above sea level. It has two pubs (The Swan and The Owain Glyndwr) and a once-busy garage, now a coach depot, home to Eagles & Crawford. Gwernymynydd is also home to a farm, a community centre, and a village primary school. Neighbouring communities include Gwernaffield, Llanferres, Nercwys, and Mold. The population at the 2011 census was 1,141.

== History ==
The current A494 follows a route used for thousands of years. In 1989 a metal detectorist discovered a group of Bronze Age axes in an area of rough ground on Hafod Moor. The finder and the landowner donated the finds to the County Council. The group consisted of four tanged axes known as palstaves; two later socketed axes and a bronze bi-valve (two piece) mould. They are dated to around 900-700 BC. The reasons for the burial are unknown but it is thought it could have been a Trader’s or Founder’s hoard where objects are buried for trading or being melted down at a later date.

Little remains of the village's industrial history; the worked-out Cambrian limestone quarry was once owned by Lever Brothers of Port Sunlight, manufacturers of VIM, a scouring powder made from the silicaceous sandstone quarried here, which was ideal for the purpose. Lever's took over the Cambrian Works and Quarry in 1905 and stayed for half a century.

Like many villages of the early 20th century, Gwernymynydd had a local benefactor, the Waln family of Fron Hall. Mold Hospital was given by them, some of its modern equipment including, it is thought, an operating table.

Ambrose Waln started a boys' scout troop, providing equipment, kit and premises. The family were generous landlords, and also employed a large household staff, plus agricultural workers.

Following the end of World War I, the Walns, having lost one of their family members in action, were instrumental in having a cenotaph erected in Gwernymynydd, at the site of the old drinking fountain. This was at the roadside between Fron Hall drive and the Twmpath on the Mold-Ruthin road (now the A494). The water for the drinking fountain came from a spring in a field behind it. This water had always been considered pure, long before the days of the fountain. Local people believed that this was not surface water, liable to contamination, but water filtered at its source through the silica rocks above. In order to establish this, quantities of peppermint were put in the mine and sure enough, eventually the spring water tasted of peppermint.

The Village Field, adjacent to the village centre, and now legally protected from development by Fields in Trust, was a gift to Gwernymynydd residents from the Waln family.

The original village school, also adjacent to the field, was replaced by a new modern building in the 1950s (now the Village Centre). The old school was converted into a house but retained several features, including the school bell that hangs near the roof. It is currently used on Remembrance Day, when it is struck eleven times at the start of the service at the War Memorial, (now situated in the grounds of the Centre, having been moved a few years ago for safety reasons. A large stone marks the original site on the A494).

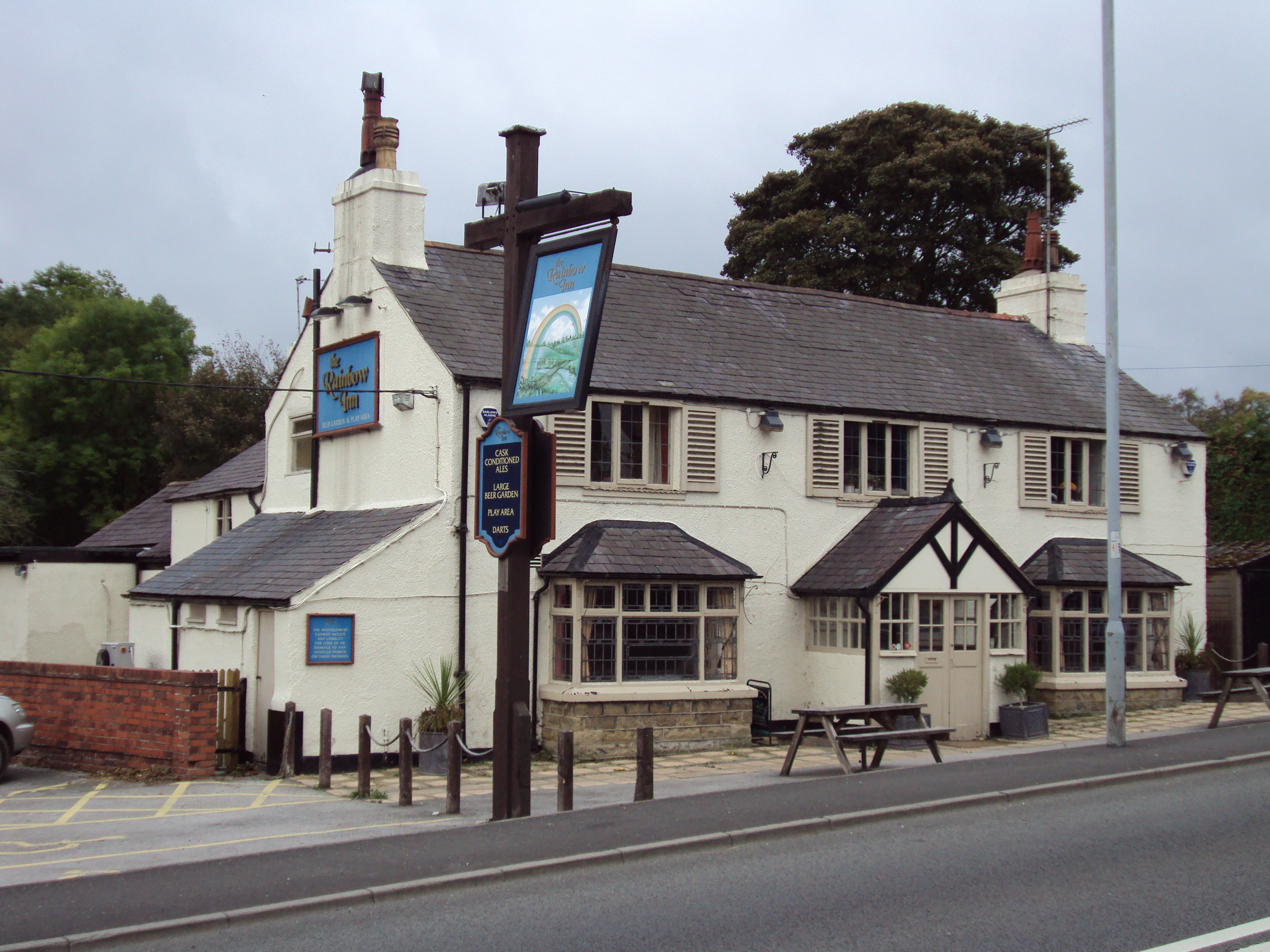
The former ''Rainbow Inn'' public house, Gwernymynydd

The Rainbow Inn was a well known feature at the top of Gwernymynydd hill for motorists heading west. It was demolished in 2019 as part of a new housing development. As a condition of the planning permission, in order to retain the landmark, the Inn building was replaced by housing of a similar appearance and footprint.

== Governance ==
Gwernymynydd and Cadole Community Council (or Gwernymynydd Community Council) consists of 11 elected councillors.

For Flintshire County Council, the community is part of the Gwernaffield and Gwernymynydd electoral ward, which elects two councillors and had a population of 3,512 in the 2021 census.

It is part of the Delyn constituency and North Wales region for the Senedd, and the Clwyd East constituency for Parliament.

== Village Centre ==
The Village Centre, situated on the left hand side of the A494 approaching the village from Mold (postcode CH7 4AF) is used by local groups and is available for public hire. In 2016, the Village Centre Committee took on a 25-year lease for the property. The Centre has a large hall area, kitchen, toilets and a small committee room. Outside there are two football pitches with changing rooms, a dog walking area as well as a memorial garden, wild flower patch and orchard.
