= Sychdyn =

Village in Wales

Coordinates: 53.18924°N 3.13889°W

Soughton: Welsh: Sychdyn
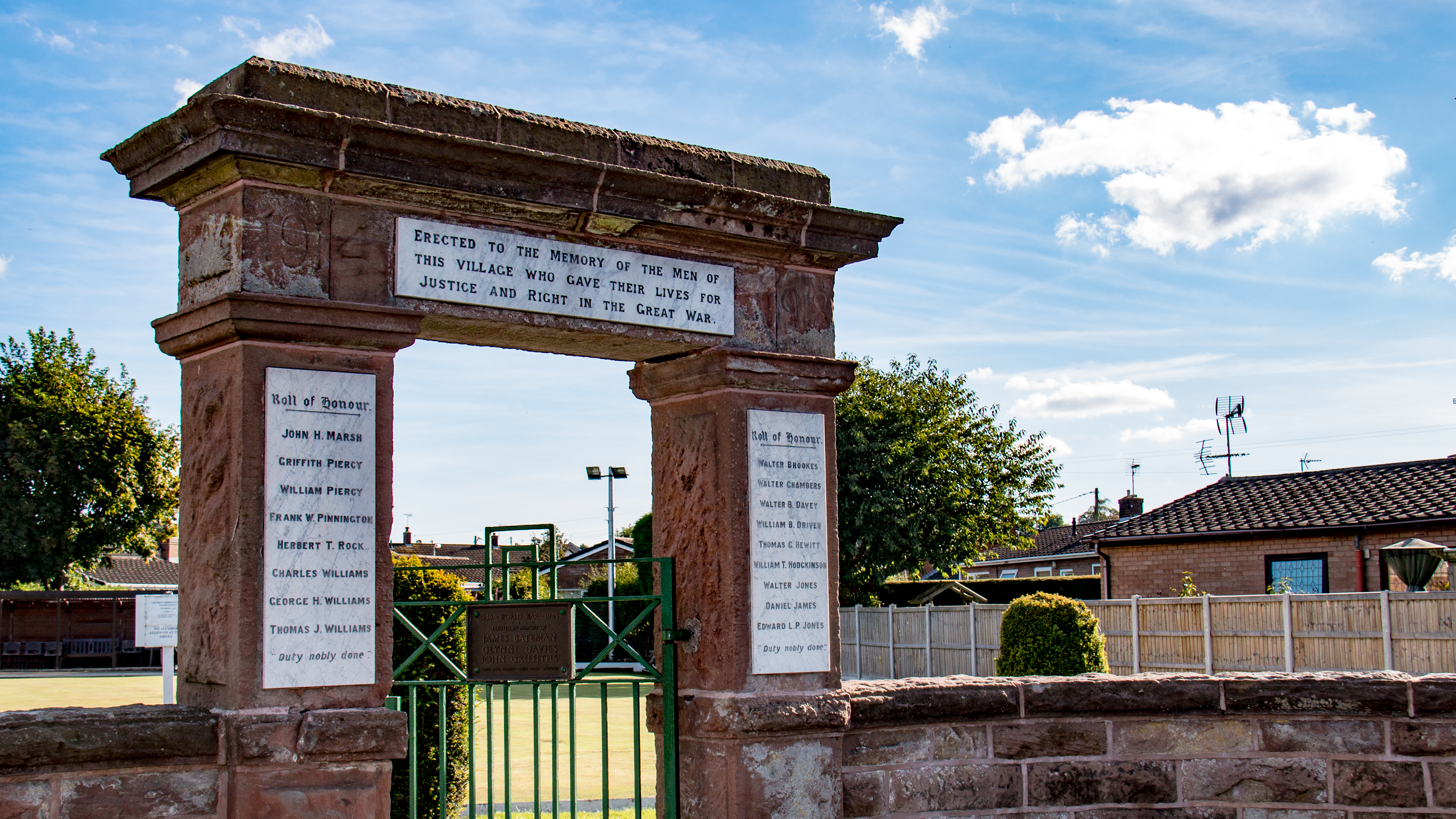
- Sychdyn War Memorial

- Location within Flintshire
- OS grid reference: SJ240664
- Community: Northop
- Principal area: Flintshire
- Preserved county: Clwyd
- Country: Wales
- Sovereign state: United Kingdom
- Post town: MOLD
- Postcode district: CH7
- Dialling code: 01352
- Police: North Wales
- Fire: North Wales
- Ambulance: Welsh
- UK Parliament: Clwyd East
- Senedd Cymru – Welsh Parliament: Delyn

Sychdyn, or Soughton, is a village in the community of Northop, in Flintshire, Wales. It is situated on the A5119 road, and is just over 1000 yards (1 km) north of the county town of Mold.

== Toponymy ==
Soughton (from Old English sog tun, "bog settlement") is the traditional name for the village in English, is still occasionally used and appears on road signs. However the cymricised form Sychdyn, recorded in c.1700 in Edward Lhuyd's Parochialia, has been the name used by Flintshire County Council since 1954, Northop Community Council, as well as by the BBC, local media (depending on publication usage is mixed), Ordnance Survey and the Welsh Language Commissioner. The spelling "Sychtyn" was also used earlier in the 20th century.

In December 2025, the community council that covers the village but named after nearby Northop was renamed from Northop Community Council to Northop and Sychdyn Community Council, to reference the village.

== History ==
In 1086, the village was listed in Domesday Book as a small settlement situated within the hundred of Ati's Cross and the county of Cheshire. However, it was back under Welsh control by the following century, and Llywelyn ap Gruffudd is on record as having visited in the late thirteenth century.

Sychdyn, which is surrounded by farmland and undisturbed woodland, is today a commuter village with residents working in nearby Chester, Wrexham, Liverpool or Manchester. The village contains the 'Cross Keys Pub' public house, a convenience store, Bryn Seion Chapel (now sold and no longer a Chapel), horse riding school, and a primary school, Sychdyn County Primary.

Soughton Hall is a large country mansion-turned-hotel situated on the northern outskirts of the village. Notable guests that have stayed here include Luciano Pavarotti, Michael Jackson, King Juan Carlos I of Spain and Richard Burton. The 2022 film The Eternal Daughter, starring Tilda Swinton and directed by Joanna Hogg, was filmed entirely in and around Soughton Hall in October and November 2020, during the COVID-19 pandemic. Lower Soughton Hall is situated about 1 mile (1.5 km) to the north of Soughton Hall, and is currently owned by the footballer Michael Owen.

Sychdyn Memorial Hall is the home to many different societies including the Youth Club and Red Dragon Lans. The hall can be hired out for special occasions. Sychdyn also has a bowling green, football pitch and all-weather pitch, which can be booked for games and matches. The bowling green is entered via a War Memorial Arch, which was erected to those who died serving in the First World War.

Sychdyn Carnival takes place each year to raise funds to maintain and upkeep the village playground, this is held on the main playing field, where the Rose Queen is crowned after the carnival procession's annual parade through the village.

Sychdyn has a football team which currently plays in the Clwyd League East Championship Division, playing their home games at The Rec in Mold.

Former professional footballer Harry Beadles died at Sychdyn in retirement in 1958.
