= Gwernaffield =

Village in Flintshire, Wales

Coordinates: 53.171°N 3.190°W

Gwernaffield: Welsh: Y Waun
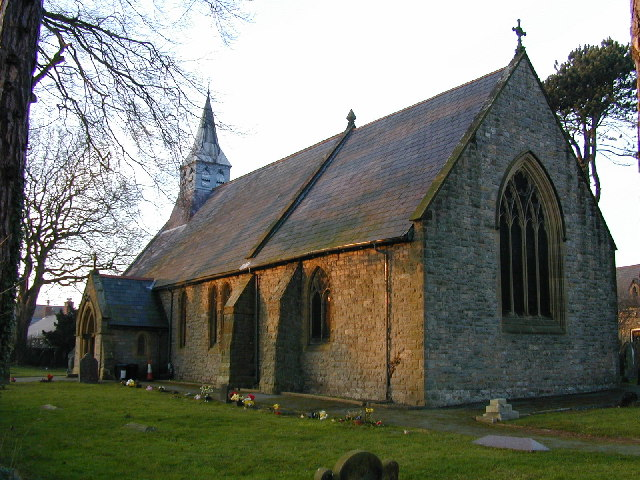
- Holy Trinity Church, Gwernaffield

- Location within Flintshire
- Population: 1,942 (2011)
- OS grid reference: SJ204644
- Community: Gwernaffield with Pantymwyn
- Principal area: Flintshire
- Preserved county: Clwyd
- Country: Wales
- Sovereign state: United Kingdom
- Post town: MOLD
- Postcode district: CH7
- Dialling code: 01352
- Police: North Wales
- Fire: North Wales
- Ambulance: Welsh
- UK Parliament: Clwyd East
- Senedd Cymru – Welsh Parliament: Delyn

Gwernaffield (Welsh: Y Waun) is a village and electoral ward in Flintshire, Wales. It lies about three miles west of Mold on the eastern side of the Clwydian Range. The village is part of the community of Gwernaffield with Pantymwyn, which has an area of 7.53 km^{2} and is bordered by the River Alyn on three sides. The community includes the neighbouring village of Pantymwyn and had a population of 1,851 at the time of the 2001 census, increasing to 1,942 at the 2011 census. The name of the village comes from gwern (Welsh for 'alder-grove'), feld (Old English for 'field') and gwaun (Welsh for 'moorland'). Gwernaffield, which adjoins Pantymwyn, Itself had a population of around 900.

== History ==
The village was first mentioned in the 15th century. In 1736, an obelisk was erected near Maesgarmon farm where, according to tradition, Saint Garmon defeated an army of Saxons and Picts in the 5th century. The village began to grow in the late 18th century as lead mines and limestone quarries were developed in the area. The last lead mine closed in the 1970s. In the 20th century rectangular blocks of commuter housing were built in the village.

== Notable buildings ==
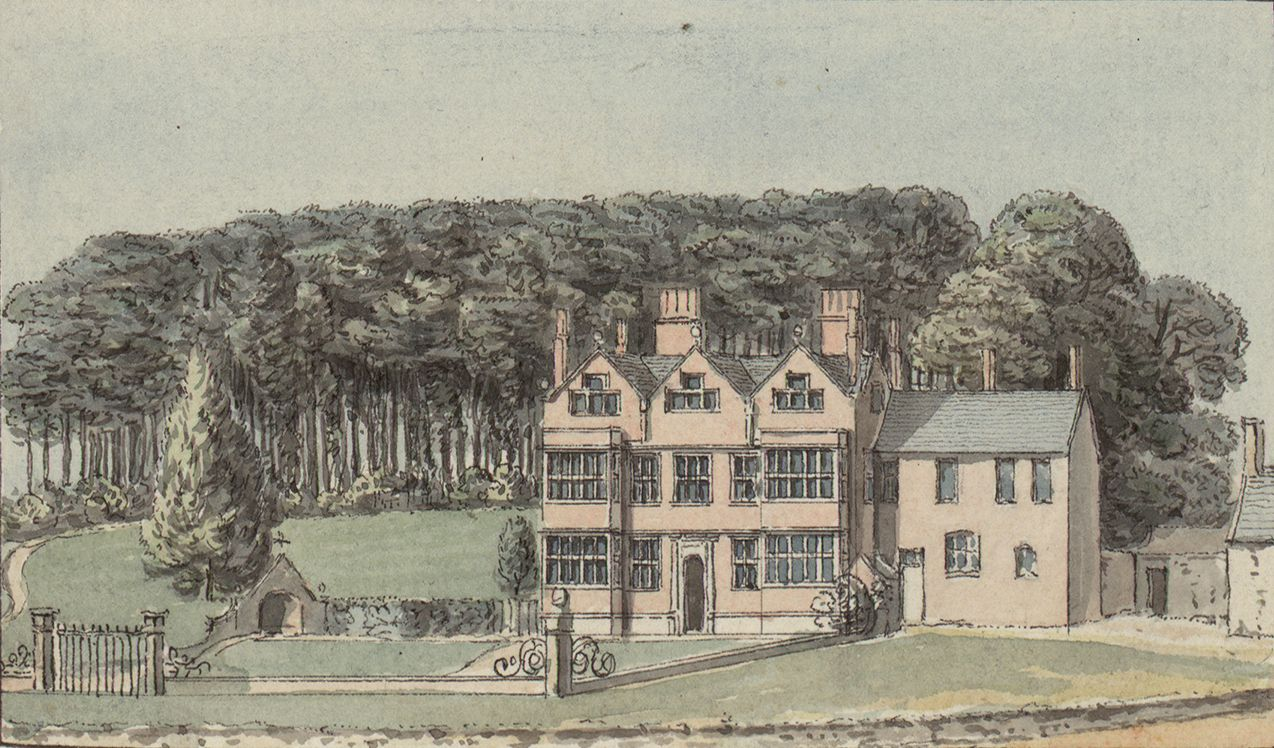
Rhual estate

In 1634, a large brick house was built at the Rhual estate; today it is the oldest house in the village. The village's first church and school were built alongside each other in 1838. The church was deliberately burned down in 1860 but a new building opened in 1872. The old school is now used as a parish hall after a new school, Ysgol y Waun, was opened in 1973. The village had two pubs until recently, the Miners Arms which closed in 2007 and the Hand Inn which remains open.
