= Lloc =

Village in Flintshire, Wales

Coordinates: 53°16′55″N 3°17′29″W

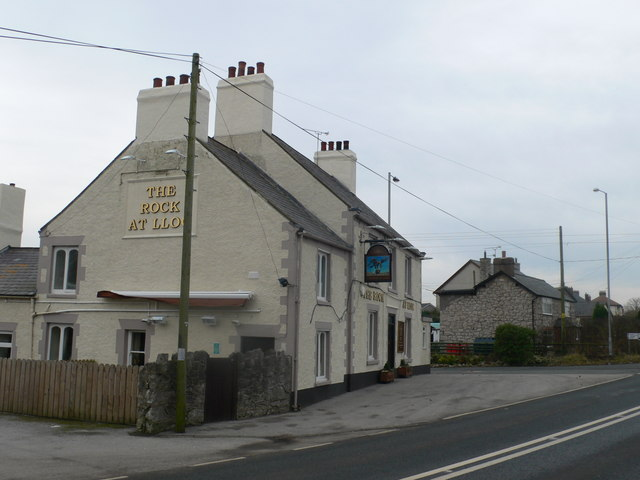
- The Rock at Lloc (former) public house. Now a private dwelling.

- Location within Flintshire
- Population: 307 (2011)
- OS grid reference: SJ140768
- Community: Whitford
- Principal area: Flintshire
- Preserved county: Clwyd
- Country: Wales
- Sovereign state: United Kingdom
- Post town: HOLYWELL
- Postcode district: CH8
- Dialling code: 01352
- Police: North Wales
- Fire: North Wales
- Ambulance: Welsh
- UK Parliament: Clwyd East
- Senedd Cymru – Welsh Parliament: Delyn

Lloc is a small village in Flintshire, north Wales. It is located within the community of Whitford. It lies north of the Clwydian Range, just east of the border with Denbighshire.

There is a local newspaper "Five Villages Chronicle", delivered to a group of villages described as the "Five Villages", which includes Lloc and the neighbouring villages of Carmel, Gorsedd, Pantasaph, and Whitford since 1987.
