= Whitford, Flintshire =

Village and community in Flintshire, Wales

Whitford: Welsh: Chwitffordd
- Village and community
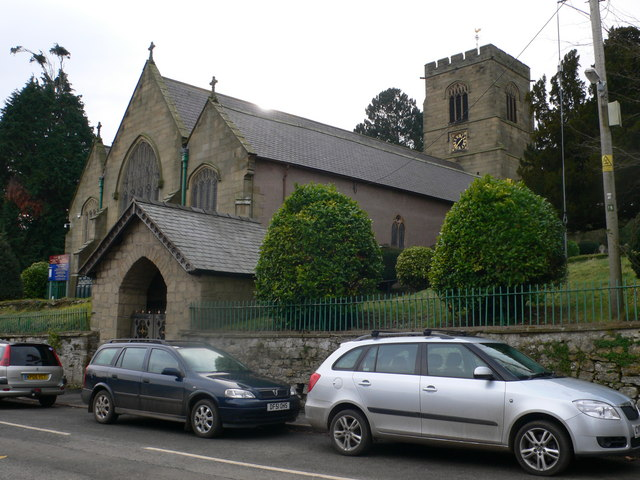
- Church of St. Mary and St. Beuno, Whitford

- Location within Flintshire
- Population: 2,332 (2011)
- OS grid reference: SJ142782
- Principal area: Flintshire
- Preserved county: Clwyd
- Country: Wales
- Sovereign state: United Kingdom
- Post town: HOLYWELL
- Postcode district: CH8
- Dialling code: 01352
- Police: North Wales
- Fire: North Wales
- Ambulance: Welsh
- UK Parliament: Clwyd East
- Senedd Cymru – Welsh Parliament: Delyn
- Website: Council website
- List of places UK Wales Flintshire 53.294°N 3.286°W Map of the community

Whitford (Welsh: Chwitffordd) is a village, community and an electoral ward near Holywell in Flintshire, northeast Wales. The population of both the community and the ward taken at the 2011 census was 2,332. The community includes the villages of Carmel, Lloc, Gorsedd and Pantasaph.

Whitford first enters recorded history with its entry in the Domesday Book (1086) as, 'Widford'. The name is English in origin, translating as, perhaps unsurprisingly, 'White Ford'. Ellis Davies, amongst others, attributes this to the foaming of the waters at a ford at nearby Glanrafon. As is often the case, the name evolved through the centuries that followed, and in 1240 the village was known as, 'Quitfordia'. In the same century it was known as 'Chwtforth', 'Chwitforth' and by the 13th century, 'Wittefordd' – a name with a Welsh flavour, if confused as a consequence. 'Whitford' was first recorded a little later in the 13th century, and by some miracle, seems to have managed to hang on to this name ever since.

Whitford’s history before the Norman Conquest is little known, though there is good reason to believe that St Beuno may well have been the founder of the Church of St Mary and St Beuno, which would set a 7th century foundation for the village. The abundance of Bronze Age tumuli and cairns about the village, and the nearby Mesolithic settlements as Dyserth, Hendre and Prestatyn would suggest Whitford stands in a very ancient environment.

Today, Whitford is chiefly known for its close association with the Pennant Family, most notably Thomas Pennant (1728 -1798), the antiquarian travel writer to whom all those with a fascination with North East Wales owes an immeasurable debt. He lived at nearby Downing Hall, which became a sort of ground zero for his research. The influence of the Mostyn Family at Whitford is also keenly felt.

The Whitford electoral ward is coterminous with the community and elects one county councillor to Flintshire County Council.
