= Pantasaph =

Village in Flintshire, Wales

Coordinates: 53.274°N 3.259°W

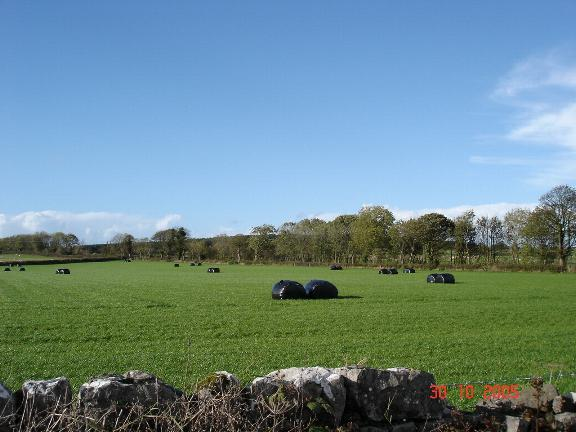
- Farmland at Pantasaph

- Location within Flintshire
- OS grid reference: SJ161760
- Principal area: Flintshire
- Preserved county: Flintshire
- Country: Wales
- Sovereign state: United Kingdom
- Post town: HOLYWELL
- Postcode district: CH8
- Dialling code: 01352
- Police: North Wales
- Fire: North Wales
- Ambulance: Welsh
- UK Parliament: Clwyd East
- Senedd Cymru – Welsh Parliament: Delyn

Pantasaph is a small village in Flintshire, north-east Wales, two miles south of Holywell in the community of Whitford. Its name translates into English as Asaph's Hollow.

== History ==
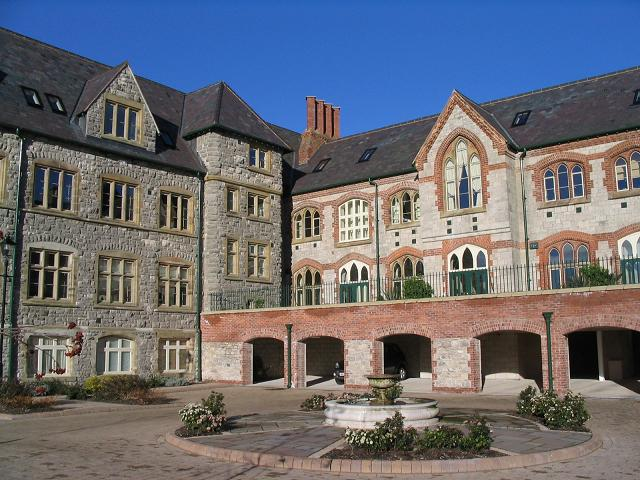
St Clares Court

The abbey lands at one point belonged to the nearby Basingwerk Abbey. Pantasaph came into the possession of the Pennant family at the Dissolution of the Monasteries. The land passed down in the family until 1846, when the sole heiress Louisa married Rudolph, Viscount Feilding, heir to the 7th Earl of Denbigh. They both converted to Roman Catholicism and decided to donate St David's Church, which they had recently built for Pantasaph, to the Catholic Church. This caused a considerably outcry at the time. It was accepted by the Friars Minor Capuchin of Great Britain as their mother house and opened in 1852. The church was designed by T H Wyatt and modified, to make it more specifically suited to Catholic use, by Augustus Pugin, who designed the high altar, the pulpit, the baptismal font, the reredos in the Lady Chapel and a statue of the Madonna and Child. The altar, reredos and statue had been exhibited in the 'Mediaeval Court' at the Great Exhibition of 1851. The pulpit was removed and destroyed during a post-Vatican II re-ordering in the 1960s. The graveyard holds the remains of three British soldiers shot for cowardice during World War I.

From St David's Church and the Friary, the Capuchins went on to start missions in other places in North Wales that became churches in their own right, such as Immaculate Conception Church in Flint in 1854 and St Anthony of Padua Church in Saltney from 1862.

The village is also the location of the former St Clare's Convent which included a boarding school, a hospital and an orphanage. It was built by a Father Seraphin of Bruges, who brought the first group of sisters to it in 1861. It closed in 1977, having at its peak housed some 500 orphans. The site lay derelict for a number of years and was damaged by fire in 1985, but has since been partly demolished and the remainder restored as luxury accommodation. It is now a designated conservation area.

The poet Francis Thompson spent some time recovering from illness at Pantasaph in the 1890s, lodging in a house beside the friary gates, at the post office and at Crecas Cottage between Pantasaph and Carmel.

== Friary ==
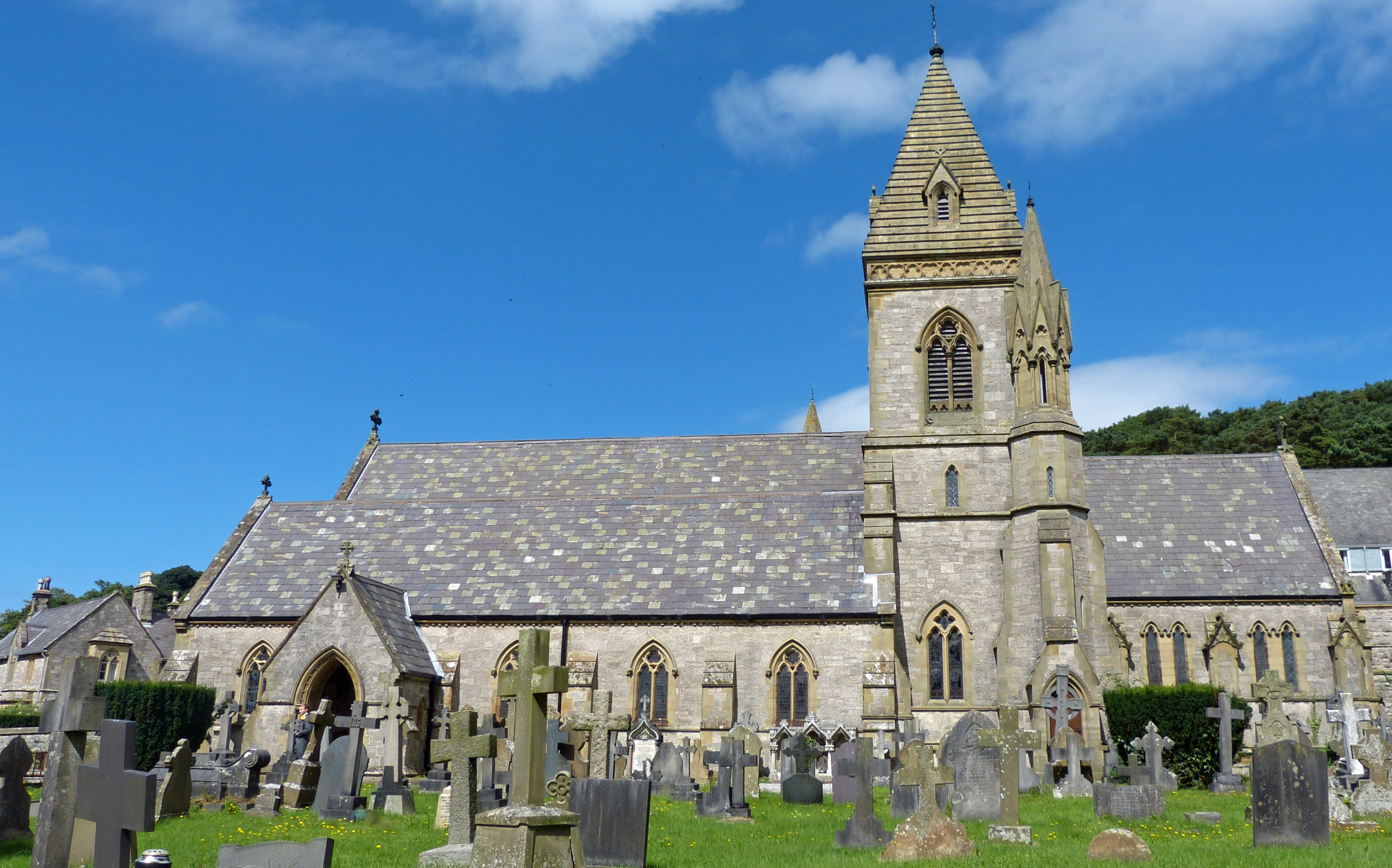
St David's Friary Church

The first friars occupied the original presbytery, (now called Denbigh House), designed by Wyatt as the vicarage to what was to be an Anglican church. Following the consecration of St David's church, the friary was constructed in Collegiate Gothic style between 1858 and 1865. A wing was added to the east in 1899 to form an L-shaped range with a turret in the angle. Built in two storeys with attics and basements it is constructed of snecked grey stone with sandstone dressings and steep slate roofs.

St David's church and the friary complex have all been awarded grade II* listed status. The friary became a large Franciscan Retreat Centre, and the friars returned to live in Denbigh House, their original home at Pantasaph. The Retreat Centre closed in December 2017.

On the wooded hill behind the complex a 19th-century zig-zag path links a landscaped Lourdes Grotto and Stations of the Cross leading to a large Calvary hill on the hilltop. An inscription at the site reads, "Special indulgences are granted by the Holy See to all who shall devoutly visit this Calvary or make the Stations or who looking from a distance to this cross shall say a Hail Mary for the conversion of England."

The Stations of the Cross are listed as Grade II in the Cadw/ICOMOS Register of Parks and Gardens of Special Historic Interest in Wales.

The Friary gardens house the National Padre Pio Centre.

== Friary and shrine ==
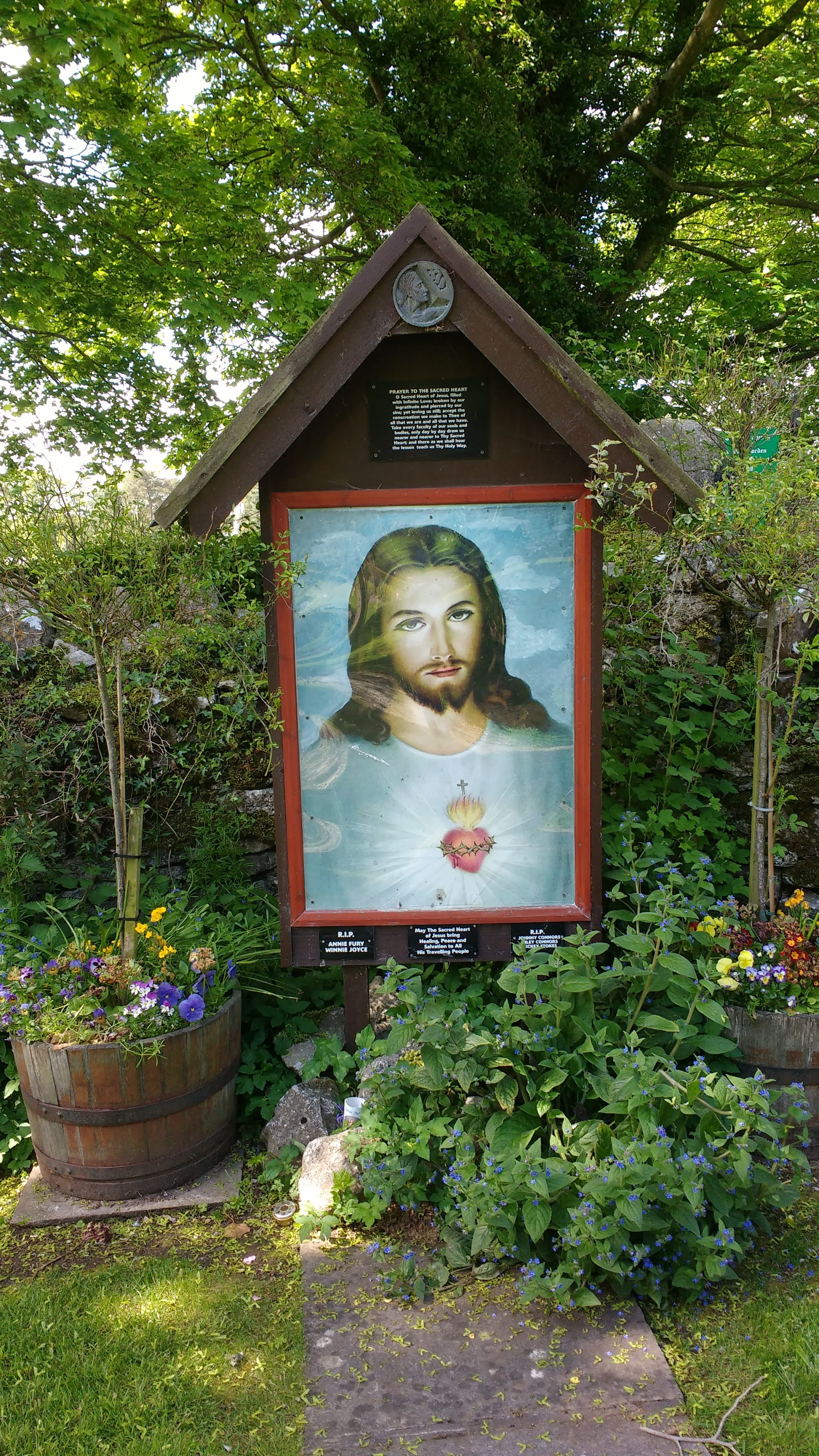
Divine Mercy Picture, Pantasaph Friary

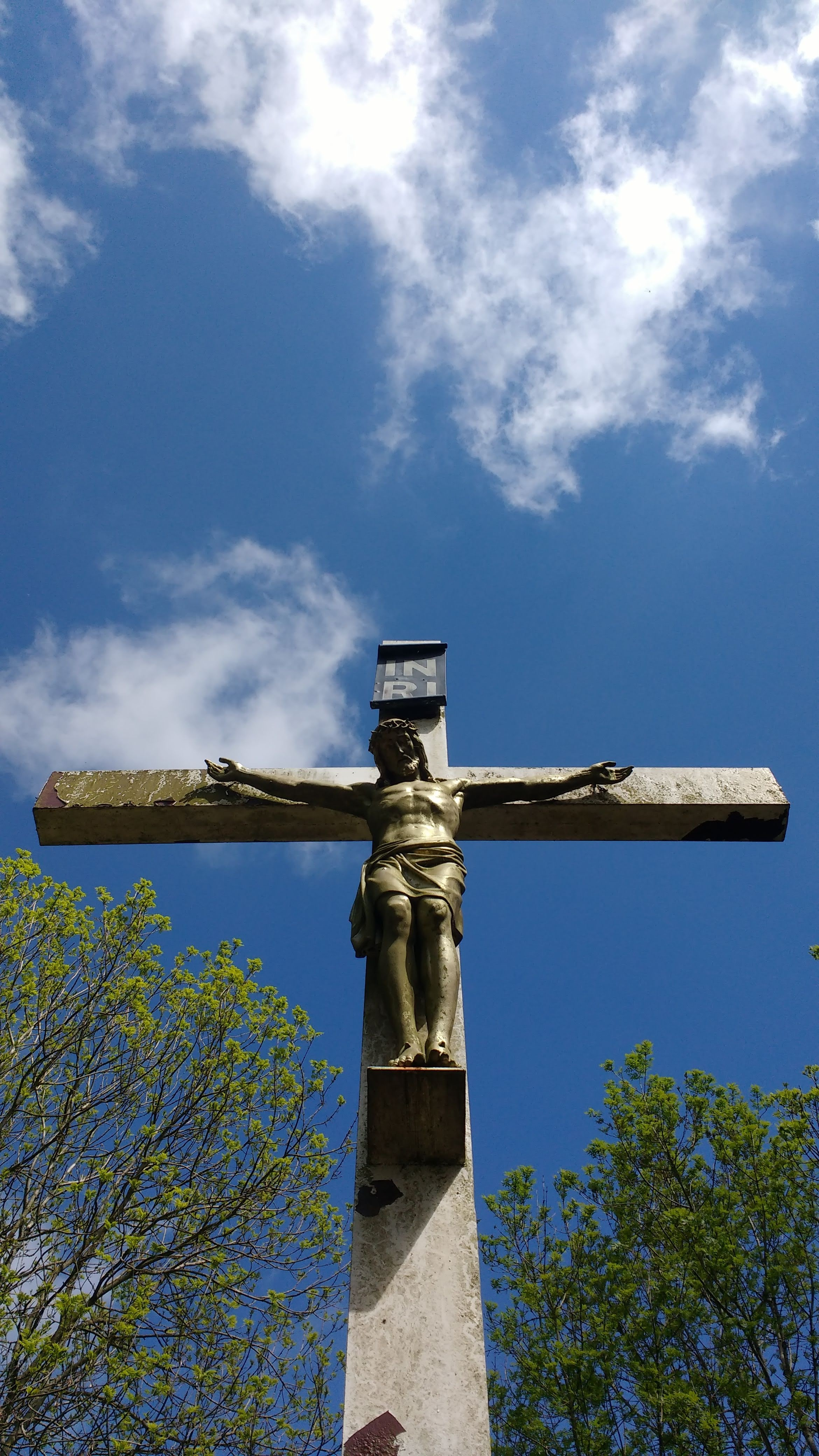
Pantasaph, The Friary. Hill top

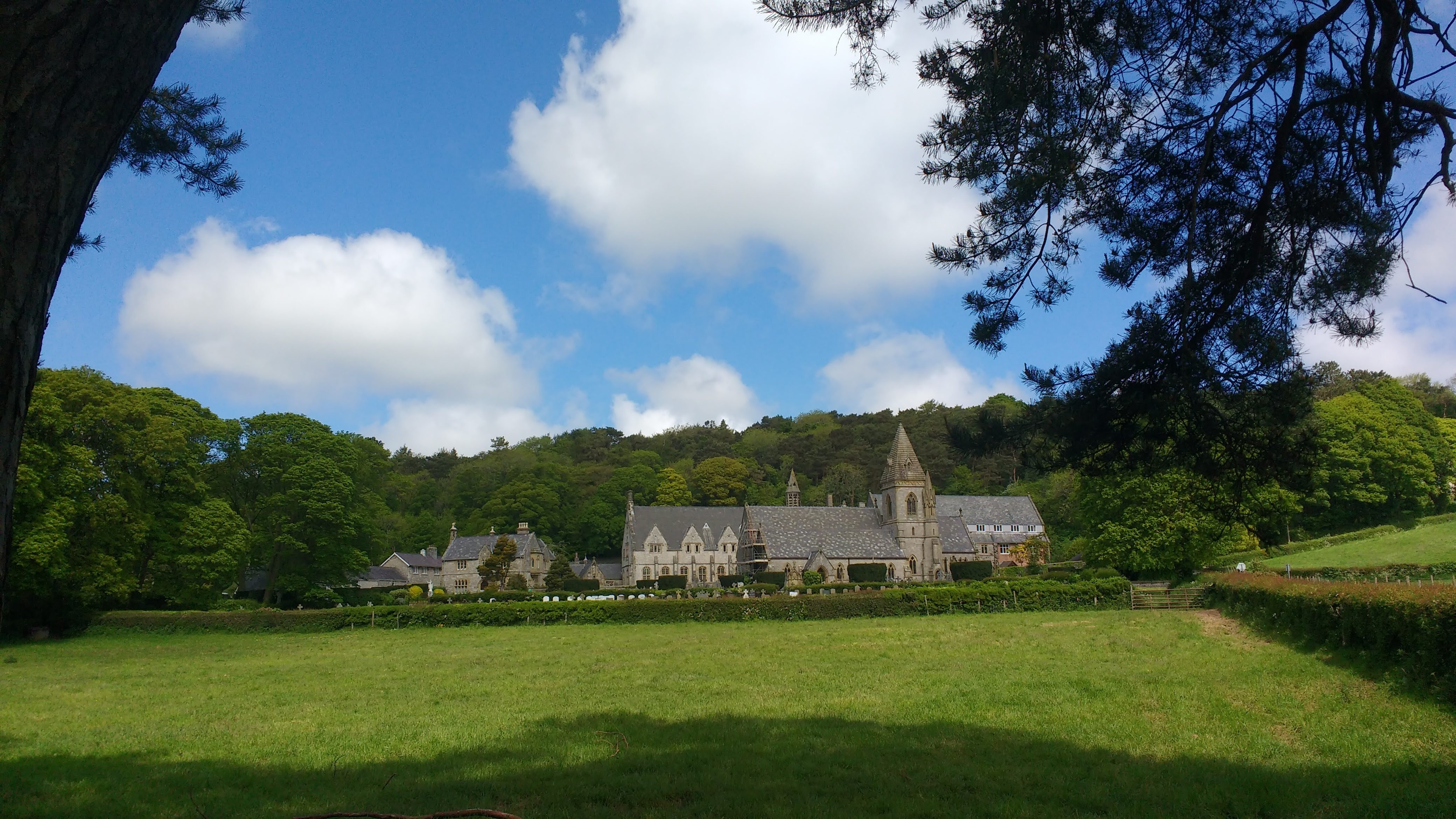
The Friary, Pantasaph, 2019

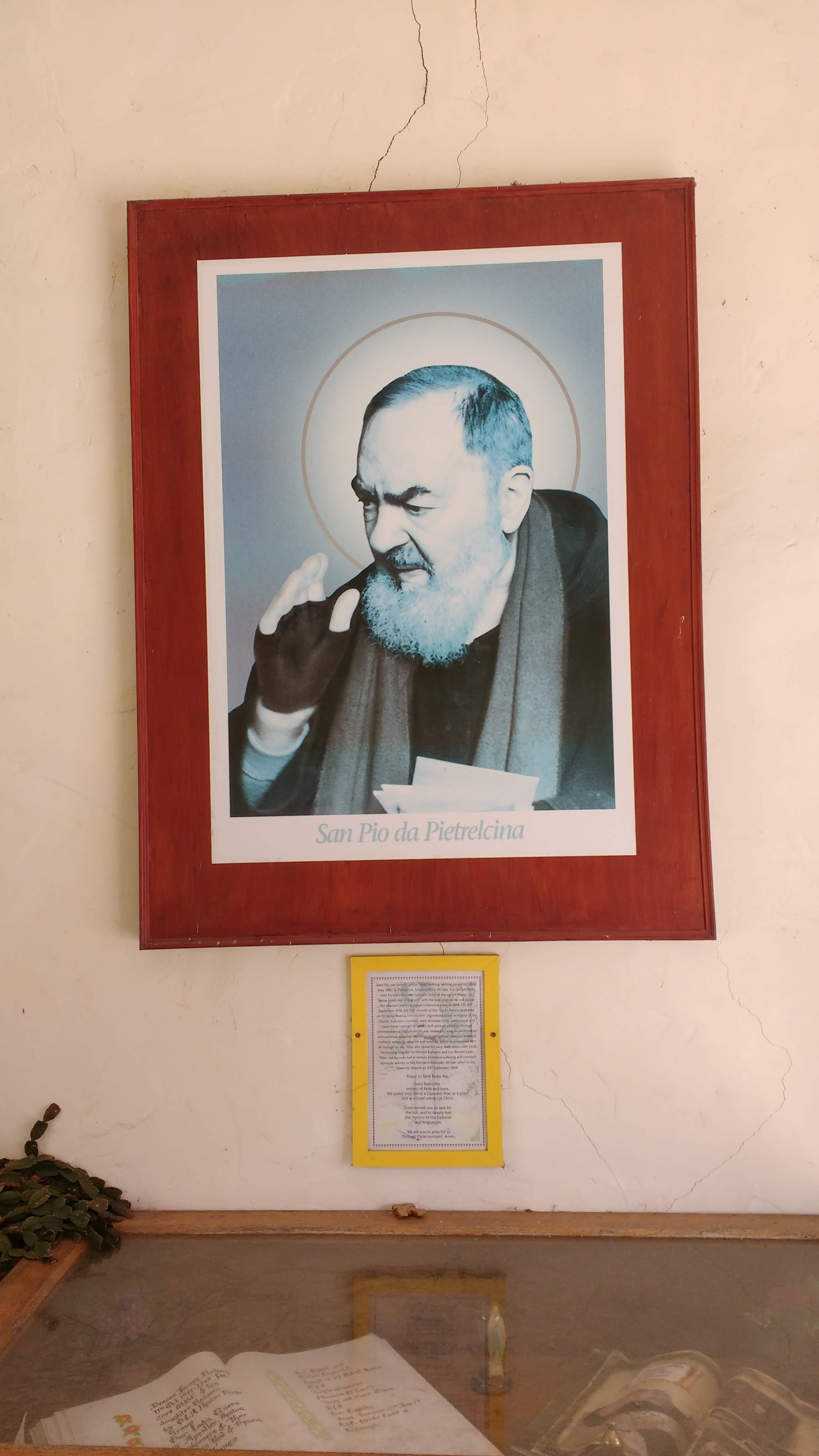
St Padre Pio, Pantasaph
