= Carmel & District Cricket Club =

Welsh cricket team

- Sport: Cricket
- Founded: 1965
- Home ground: Pen-y-Gelli Cricket Ground
- Captain: Barry Mcgauty
- Website: www.carmelcc.co.uk

Carmel & District Cricket Club is a cricket team based in Flintshire North Wales. They play competitive cricket in the North Wales Cricket League. They are the only Welsh village team to have defeated an international cricket team, and staged matches between national teams at their Pen-y-Gelli ground.

== History ==
Carmel was founded as the result of a public meeting for those interested in the formation of a cricket club in September 1965. The main people behind the meeting were Norman Cross-Parry, Meirion Griffith and Bill Parker.

The club initially played at Golch ground in the village of Carmel between Lloc and Holywell.

The club's first match took place against a now defunct team made of workers from BJ Construction. The inaugural season also saw matches against Abergele, St Asaph and Northop Hall.

Eventually the Golch site was sold and the club successfully applied to the Sports Council and Delyn Borough Council for grant-aid to re-establish the club on another ground.

A 7.23-acre (29,300 m^{2}) site with good quality soil for a cricket square was found. Carmel began their first season at their new Pen-y-Gelli ground in 1991 and Conwy CC provided the opponents in the inaugural match. Backed by club secretary Stan Taylor, Carmel continued to develop their facilities and in July 1998 former England cricket international Tom Cartwright and Mrs Dorothy Taylor opened the new pavilion.

Carmel forayed into international cricket beginning with the Iron Curtain Cricket Tour in 2007 under the captaincy of Timothy Abraham. The touring side played Estonia in Tallinn and Latvia in Riga. Carmel defeated Estonia in the final of the Helsinki Sixes tournament in Finland, but lost twice in longer matches against the team.

A match against Russia in the Russian National Baseball Stadium in Moscow that became the tour highlight when they became the first touring side to ever visit the city.

In June 2008 the Carmel Touring XI again went overseas for the 'Ottoman Empire Tour' where they defeated Romania in Bucharest and Bulgaria in Sofia. Carmel represented 'Wales' in the Vienna World Cup Sixes competition where they were beaten in the semi-finals by an Austro-Pakistani team.

July 2008 saw Carmel stage their biggest project yet with the establishing of an eight-team European Twenty20 Championship tournament that featured Estonia and Russia. Also involved were the national teams of Slovakia, Croatia, Czech Republic and Poland as well as a Cricket Board of Wales representative side.

The tournament, which was supported by the International Cricket Council, was won by Estonia who beat Czech Republic in a dramatic last-over victory. Carmel staged the European Twenty20 tournament again in July 2009 and the national cricket teams of Croatia, Hungary, Bulgaria, Russia as well as the Island of Alderney were among those to take part. The tournament was won by a team that represented the Flanders region after they defeated hosts Carmel in a low-scoring final. Croatia won the 'plate' competition after they defeated English club side New Victoria who had replaced Estonia after they pulled out of the event. In the week preceding the EuroTwenty20 Carmel faced prestigious touring side Crusaders Australia led by Swan Richards.

Carmel's Touring XI undertook their most ambitious tour in May and June 2009 where they played in six countries in 11 days. After victory at the Lille Twenty20 tournament in France the team recorded victories over Slovakia in Hajske and over Hungary in Budapest.

One of the biggest honours for the club's touring side came later in the trip when they played the first ever international cricket match in Serbia where they ran out winners in a 40-over contest against a Belgrade Cricket Association XI. Carmel subsequently played the first international match in Macedonia when they took on a Macedonian XI in Skopje. The first of two Twenty20 clashes between the two sides was broadcast live in its entirety on national television station Sky Net.

Carmel's Touring XI toured Austria, Slovenia, and Croatia in 2010, Poland, Lithuania and Latvia in 2012, Romania and Switzerland in 2013. In 2014 they played the first ever game of cricket in Montenegro against Porto Montenegro Cricket Club as well as returning to Austria, Slovenia and Austria.

On 8 October 2009 the club lost Peter Ferguson, who died from cancer. Ferguson made 1,169 appearances, scoring 12,000 runs and 1,443 wickets.

In January 2010 the club staged an international 'Snow cricket' match at the club's Pen-y-Gelli between the club's English and Welsh players. The match ended in a tie. The club was the first team in the North Wales Cricket League to embrace social networking sites Facebook and Twitter

Carmel's First XI captain for the 2015 season is Barry Mcgauty, Second XI skipper is Christopher Jones and Third XI captain is Nick Hughes.
