= Thornton Hough =

Coordinates: 53.322°N 3.047°W

- Village
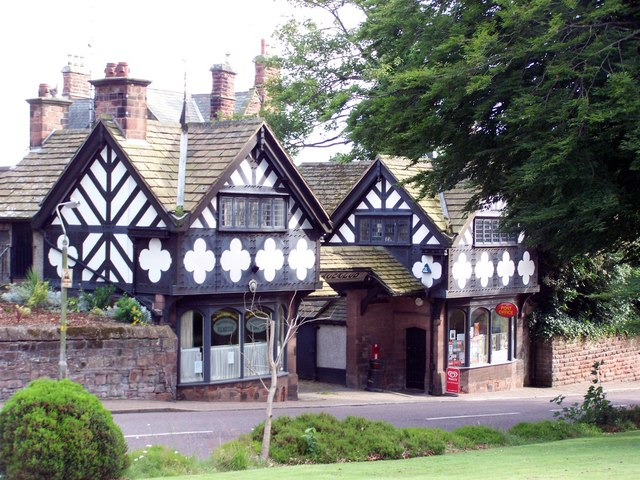
- Thornton Hough Village Club and Bar

- Location within Merseyside
- Population: 770 (2001 census)
- OS grid reference: SJ303811
  - London: 176 mi (283 km) SE
- Metropolitan borough: Wirral
- Metropolitan county: Merseyside
- Region: North West
- Country: England
- Sovereign state: United Kingdom
- Post town: Wirral
- Postcode district: CH63
- Dialling code: 0151
- ISO 3166 code: GB-WRL
- Police: Merseyside
- Fire: Merseyside
- Ambulance: North West
- UK Parliament: Wirral West

Thornton Hough (/ˈhʌf/) is a village in the Wirral district of Merseyside, England. The village lies in the more rural inland part of the Wirral Peninsula and is of pre-Norman Conquest origins. The village grew during the ownership of Joseph Hirst into a small model village and was later acquired by William Lever, founder of Lever Brothers, the predecessor of Unilever. Thornton Hough is roughly 10 miles (16 km) from Liverpool and 12 miles (19 km) from Chester. It is part of the Clatterbridge ward and is in the parliamentary constituency of Wirral South.

At the 2001 census, Thornton Hough had 770 inhabitants.

== History ==
The name Thornton means "thorn-tree farm/settlement" and likely derives from the Old English words þorn (hawthorn tree) and tūn (a farmstead or settlement). It is mentioned in the Domesday Book of 1086 as Torintone, under the ownership of Robert of Rhuddlan. The present name of the village was established when the daughter of local landowner Roger de Thorneton, married Richard de Hoghe during the reign of Edward II.

By the beginning of the 19th century, Thornton Hough formed part of the Neston Estate owned by Baron Mostyn of Mostyn, Flintshire. The population of the parish was recorded as 165 in 1801, 164 in 1851, 547 in 1901 and 506 in 1951.

Joseph Hirst, a Yorkshire woollen millowner, bought farmland land in 1866 and began the development of a small model village, building a church, a school and 'Wilshaw Terrace'. The village was bought and expanded by William Lever who developed housing for family, estate workers and company staff in a similar way to Port Sunlight, building another shop, the school, a social club and the Congregational church. Development continued in the early 20th century.

== Geography ==
Thornton Hough is in the central part of the Wirral Peninsula, approximately 11 km (6.8 mi) south-south-east of the Irish Sea at Leasowe Lighthouse, 3.5 km (2.2 mi) north-east of the Dee Estuary at Parkgate and about 6 km (3.7 mi) west-south-west of the River Mersey at Bromborough. The centre of the village is situated at an elevation of between 50 and 55 m (164 and 180 ft) above sea level.

== Landmarks ==
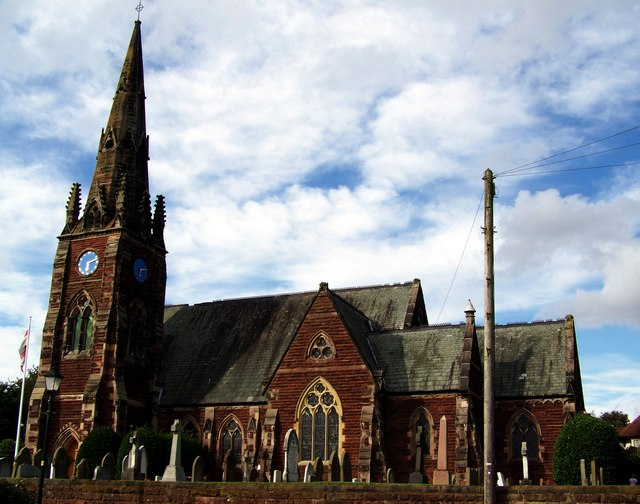
All Saints Church

Thornton Hough and the villages of Brimstage and Raby are in an Area of Special Landscape Value, a protective designation to preserve the character and appearance of the area There are 22 listed buildings in the village which was made a conservation area in 1979.

Hirst employed Kirk and Sons of Huddersfield to design All Saints Church and its vicarage, a school and school master's house and Wilshaw Terrace before 1870. All Saints, the parish church, is a grade II listed building built in 1867, it has a spire and tower displaying five clock faces. The north transept window, designed by H. Gustave Hiller is a memorial to Joseph Hirt.

Lever's architects used a wide variety of building materials including red and buff sandstone, brick, timber framing, render and pebbledash with roofs made of clay tiles or thick stone slates which creates the impression that the village appears to be older than it is. Lever used several architects, including John Douglas. The firm of Grayson and Ould designed the Village Club and Post Office, Weald House, several houses in The Folds and rebuilt Thornton House in 1895 and designed its lodges and stables. Jonathon Simpson built the Lever School and his son, James Lomax-Simpson, rebuilt the Smithy, designed D’Arcy Cottages and extensions to Thornton House. He also designed Saint George's United Reformed Church, a reproduction Romanesque style church in 1906. William and Segar Owen designed various houses including Thicketford.

Thornton Hall, once the home of wealthy shipping merchants, the Bamford Brothers of Liverpool, is believed to have been built in the mid-1800s. It was transformed into a hotel in 1954 and many of its original features remain intact including oak carvings and the ornate mother of pearl embossed ceiling in the Italian Room.

Thornton Manor, built in an Elizabethan style dates from the 1840s, and was once the home of Lord Leverhulme. From 2005 the house and gardens underwent extensive renovation. The building is now a wedding venue and provides facilities for corporate functions.

Thornton House, a grade II listed building built by Douglas & Fordham in 1893 is a two-storey timber-framed house in a mock-Tudor style on a stone base. Thicketford built in 1892 is preserved in a largely unaltered condition.

Hesketh Grange, a grade II listed building, was built in 1894 for Leverhulme's father.

== Governance ==
Thornton Hough was a township and chapelry in the parish of Neston, of the Wirral Hundred. It became a civil parish in 1866. Historically within the county of Cheshire, it was part of the Wirral Rural District between 1894 and 1933. In 1933 the parish was absorbed into the urban district of Bebington, which subsequently became the Municipal Borough of Bebington in 1937. After 1933 Thornton Hough was therefore an urban parish and so had no parish council, instead being directly administered as part of Bebington. Further changes occurred on 1 April 1974, when local government reorganisation resulted in most of Wirral, including Thornton Hough, being transferred from Cheshire to metropolitan borough of Wirral in the newly formed county of Merseyside, No successor parish was created for the former borough of Bebington.

As of 2026, Thornton Hough is within the Clatterbridge Ward of the Metropolitan Borough of Wirral. The village is represented nationally through the parliamentary constituency of Wirral South.

== Community ==
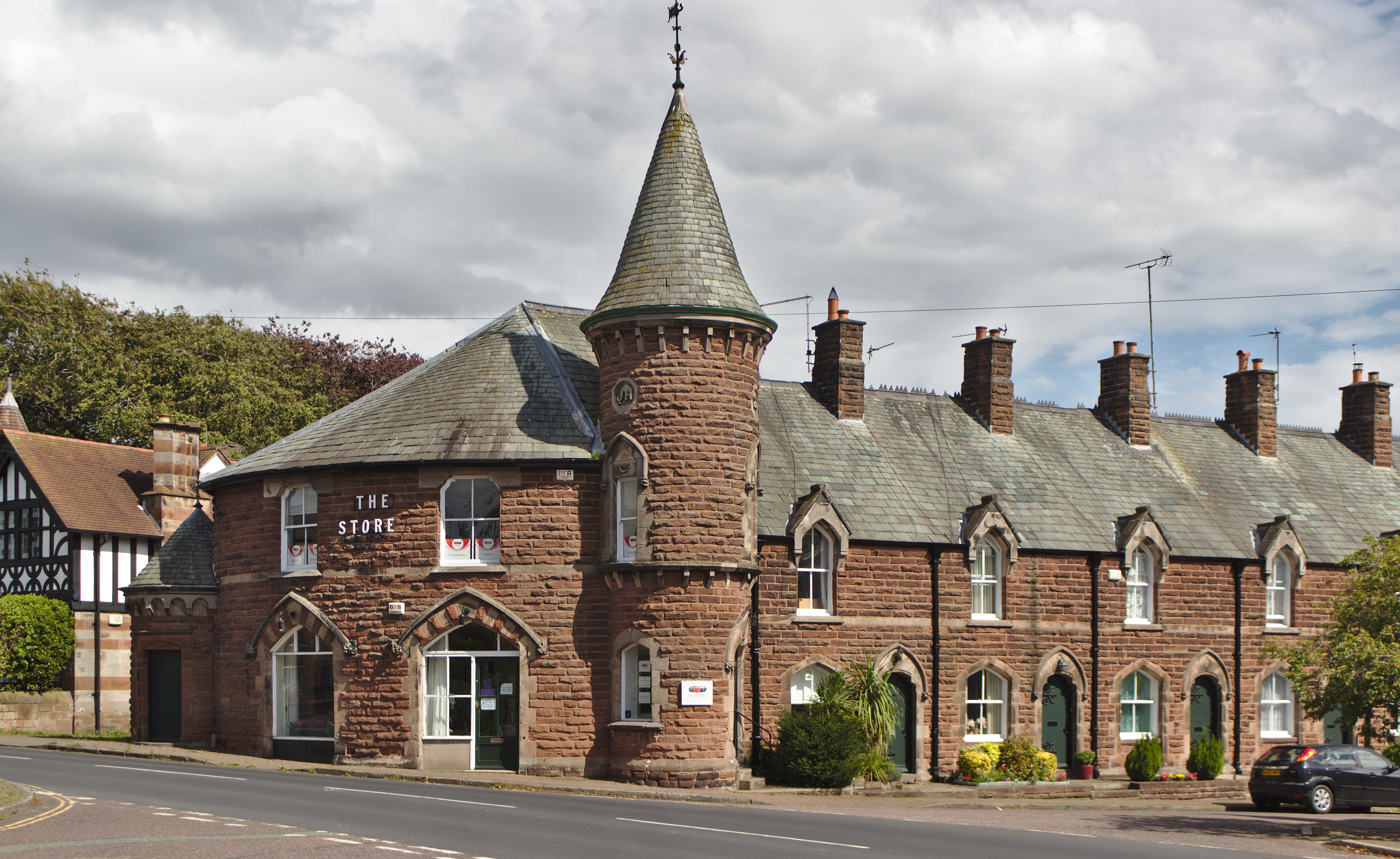
The Stores and Wilshaw Terrace

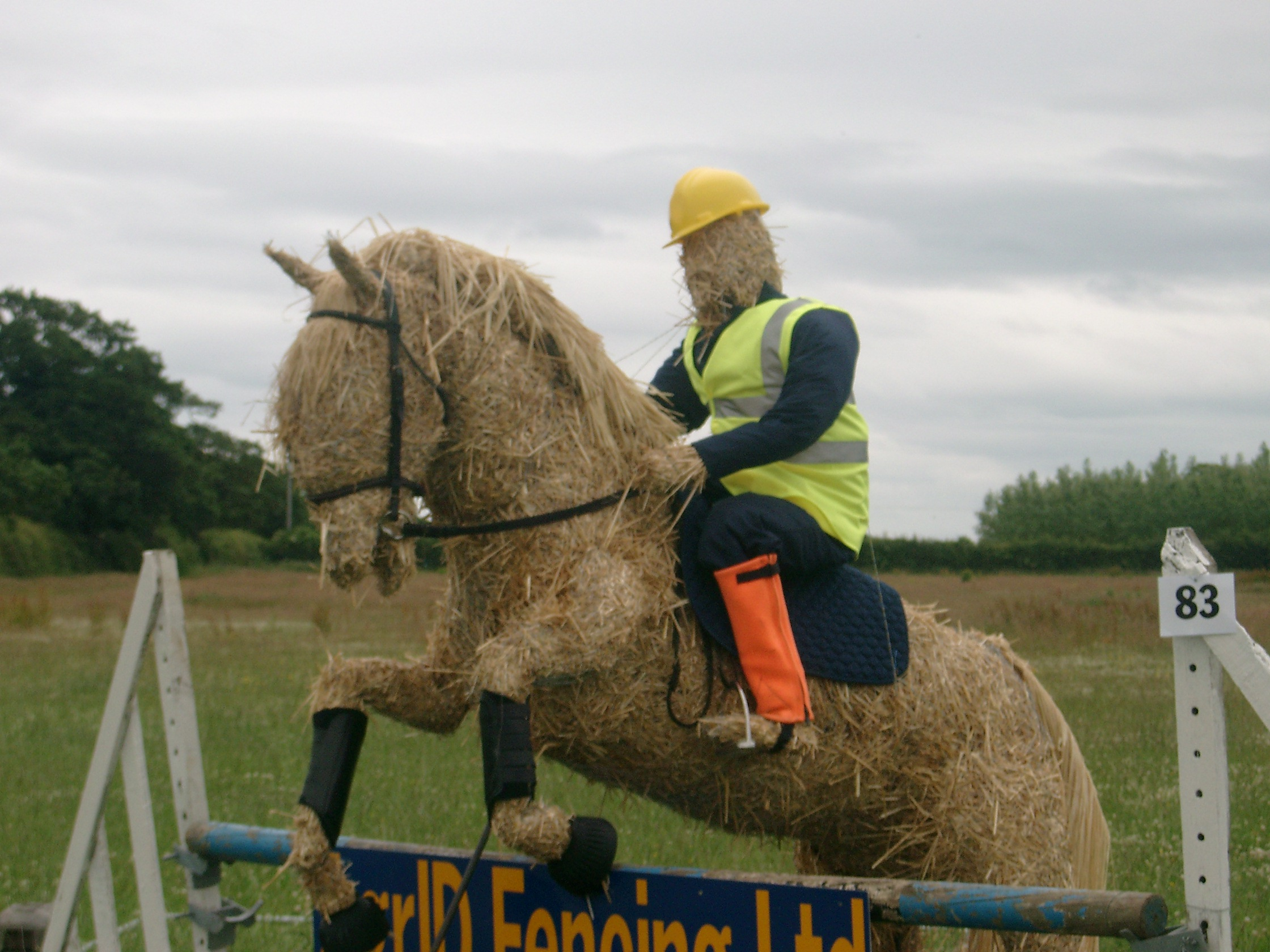
A scarecrow festival entrant from 2005

Thornton Hough's central feature is the village green with its cricket pitch and pavilion, tennis courts, and a children's play area.

The local primary school is Thornton Hough Primary School located on St George's Way and is the catchment school for children living in Thornton Hough, Raby Mere, Raby and Brimstage. This school building was originally built to serve as a military building, but was turned over for school usage after the Second World War. The original playground has been reduced in size due to the building extensions of decking and garden areas.

The Parish Hall was the original village school until it closed in 1953, it has a Victorian exterior, although its interior has been updated. The Village Hall is a large extension to the original wooden hall belonging to St George's Church and was built in the 1970s by Collins Construction. It is referred to as the New Village Hall to set it apart from the Parish Hall which is used for the fortnightly youth club. Since it opened, the hall has been used for a variety of local events and as a venue for parties. The hall is used by the badminton club, play-school, Cubs, Scouts, Rainbows, Brownies and Guides.

The village has a number of shops and a post office next to which is the British Legion, known as "the Men's Club" as women were barred except for on two days per year. The Village Stores struggled to compete with the bigger and cheaper supermarkets before its closure in 2007. It is now Jennifer O'Neill Cakes and Dragonfly Couture Stationery, 'The Seven Stars', is a traditional public house established in the 1840s on what was once a turnpike route between Birkenhead and Neston. In 1905 the smithy moved from its original site into a half timbered building and was extant in 2009.

Just outside the village is 'The Red Fox', a public house and restaurant on the border of Thornton Hough and Neston.

=== Culture ===
The Thornton Hough Scarecrow Festival was held between 1999 and 2006. Residents participating made scarecrows of varying designs and quality, which were judged at the end of a week-long open season. The festival also included a fête on the village green. By 2006, when the festival attracted over 35,000 visitors, it had raised £75,000 for village projects.

In 2017 the village green was used as a location for the film Tolkien.

== Notable people ==
- William Lever, 1st Viscount Leverhulme, industrialist, lived at Thornton Manor
- William Lever, 2nd Viscount Leverhulme, co-founder of Unilever, born and raised in Thornton Hough

== Gallery ==
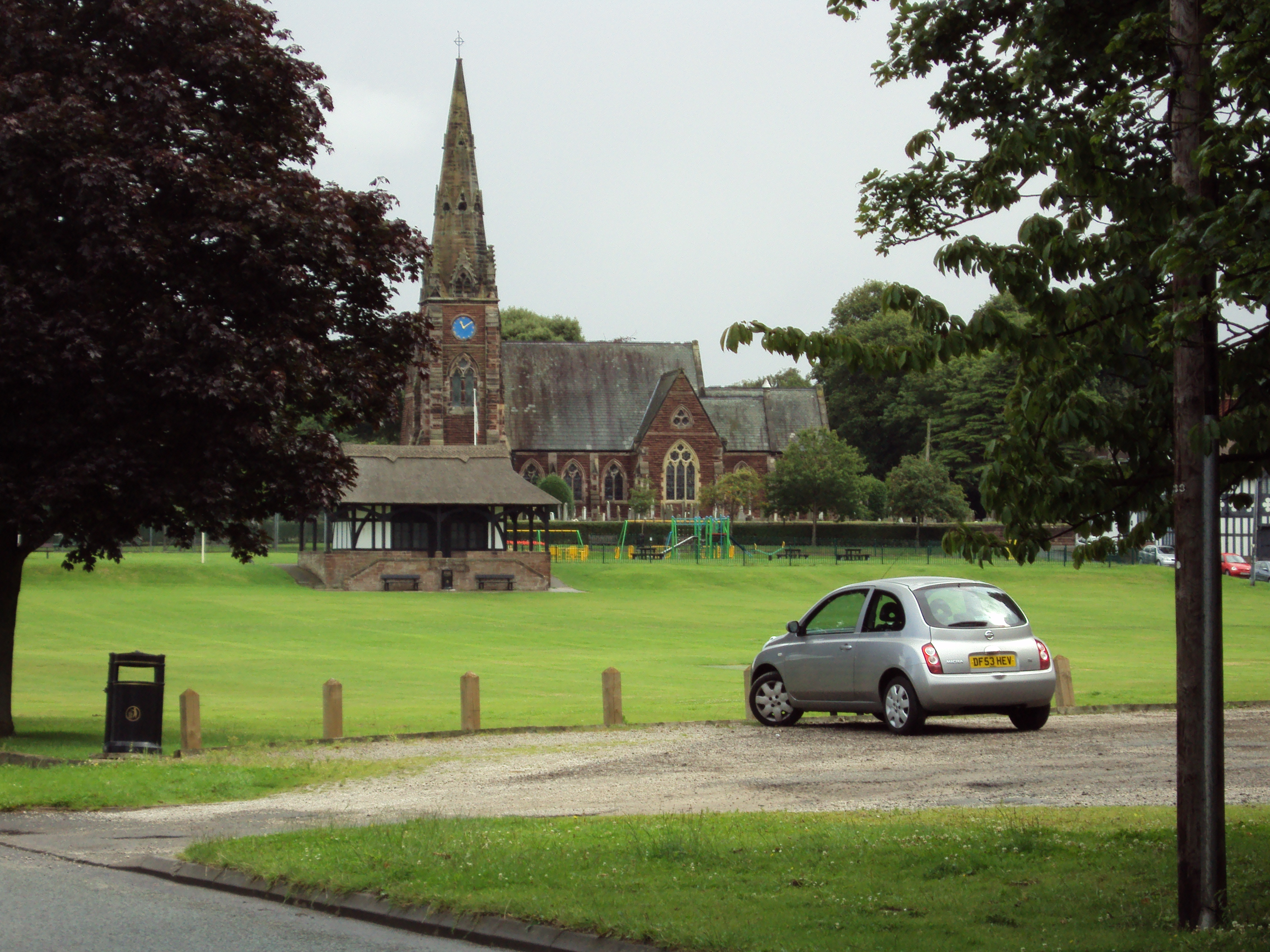
The village green

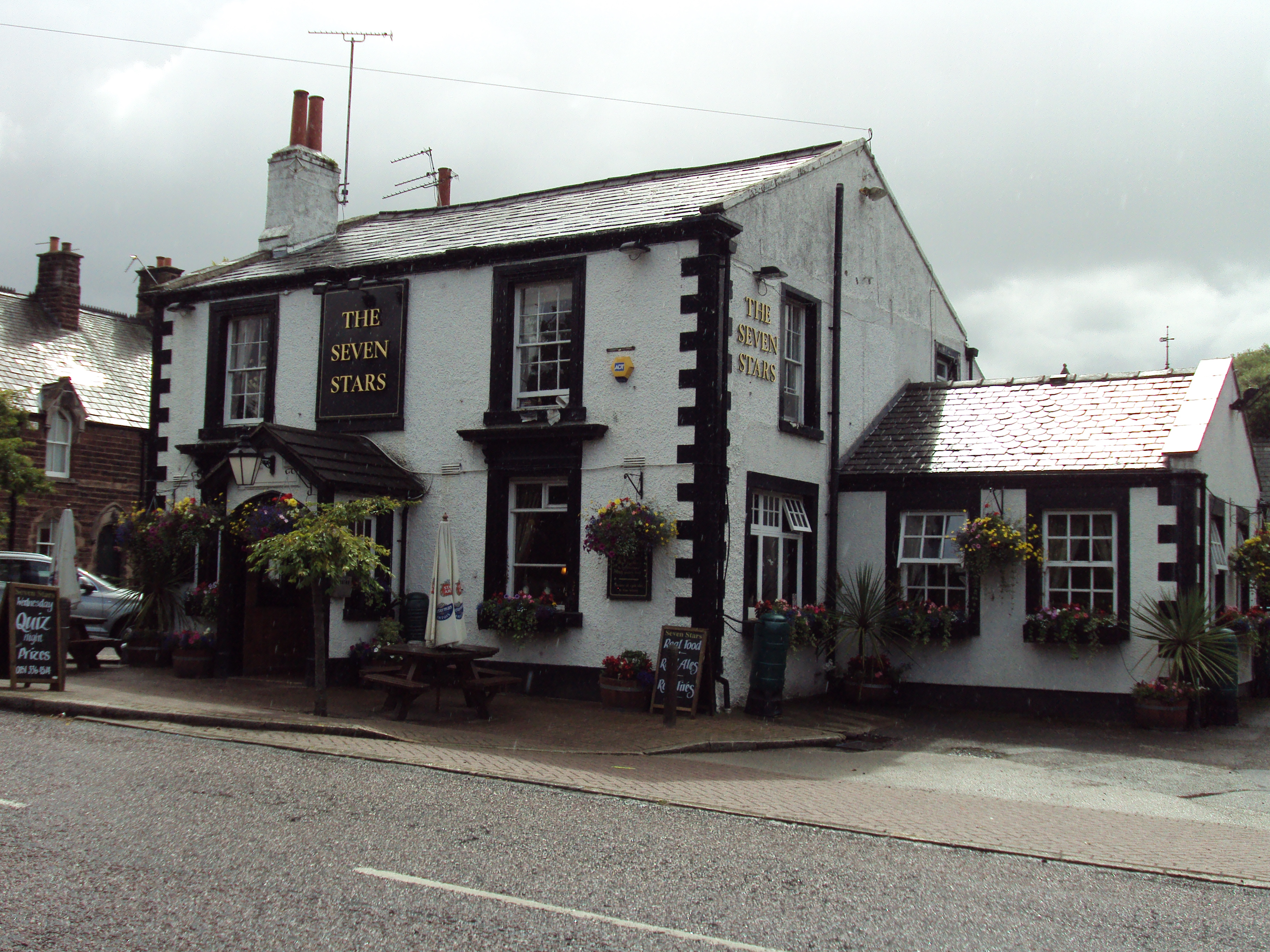
The Seven Stars public house

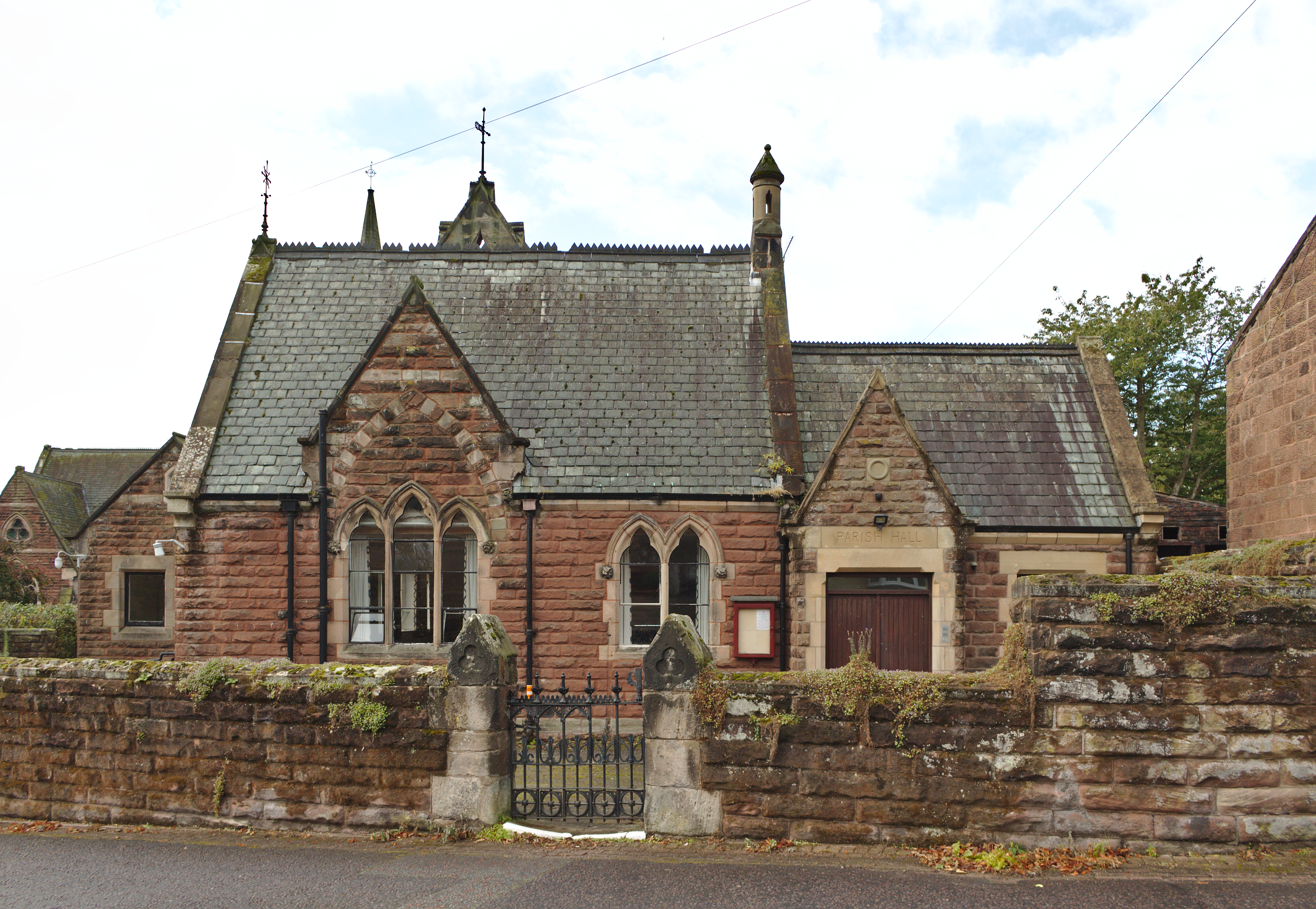
The Parish Hall

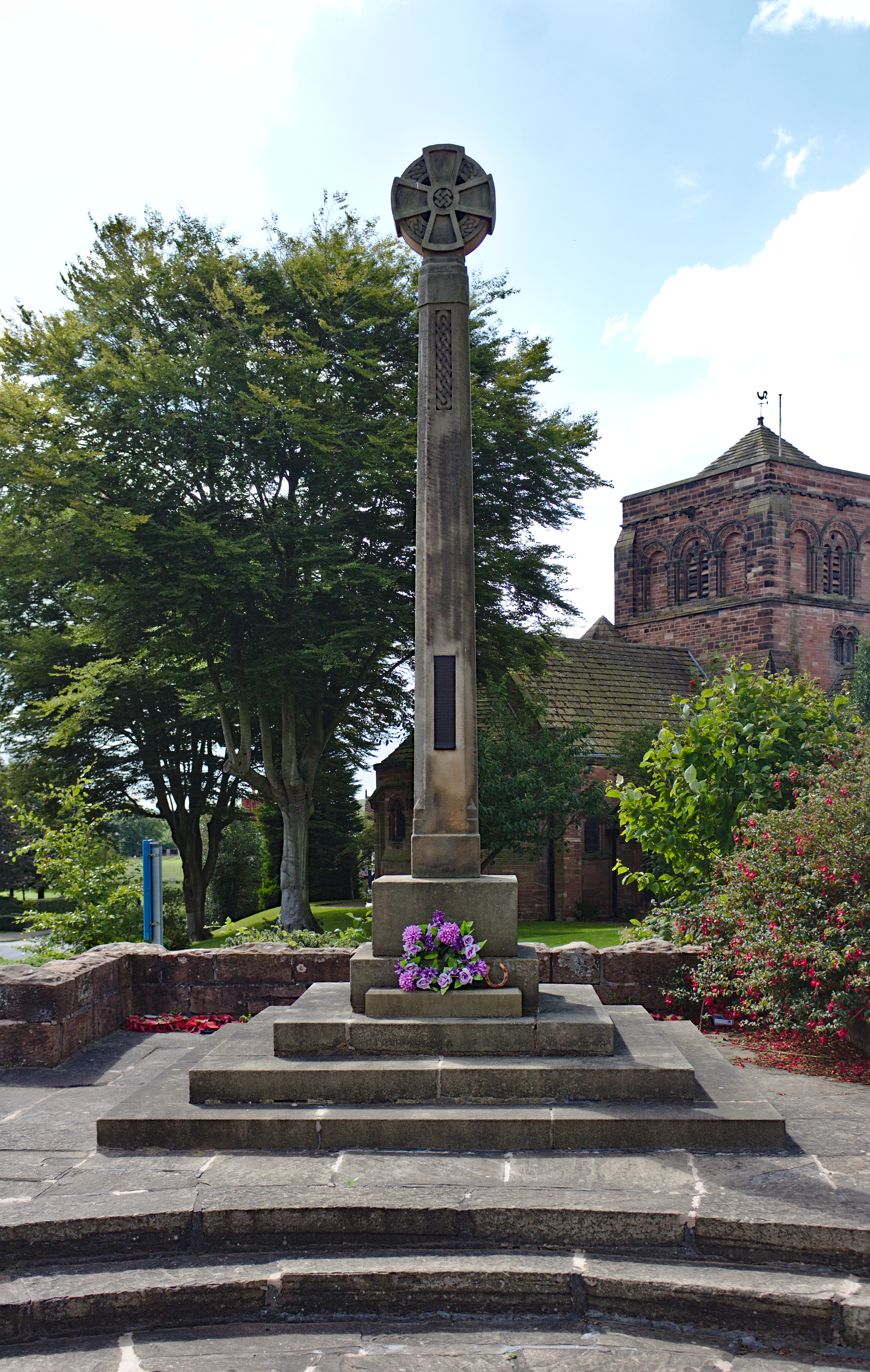
The War Memorial, by Ernest Prestwich.

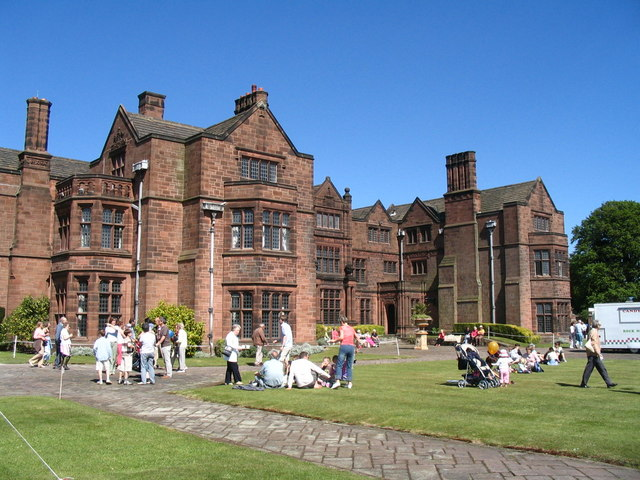
An open day at Thornton Manor in 2005

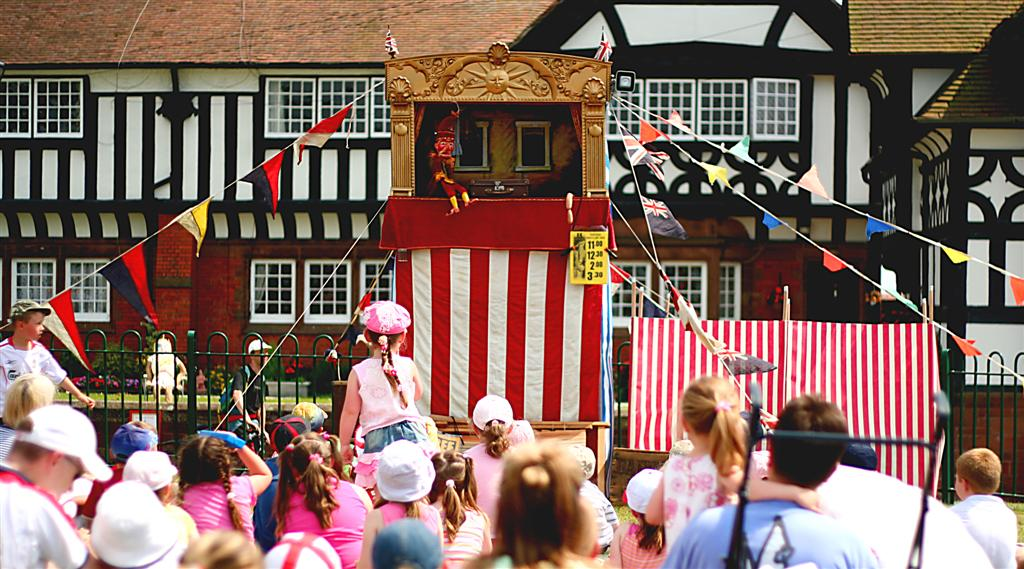
A Punch and Judy show on the village green

== See also ==
- Listed buildings in Thornton Hough

== Bibliography ==
- Mortimer, William Williams (1847). The History of the Hundred of Wirral. London: Whittaker & Co. pp243-244.
