= Raby Mere =

Coordinates: 53.3205°N 2.9977°W

- Hamlet
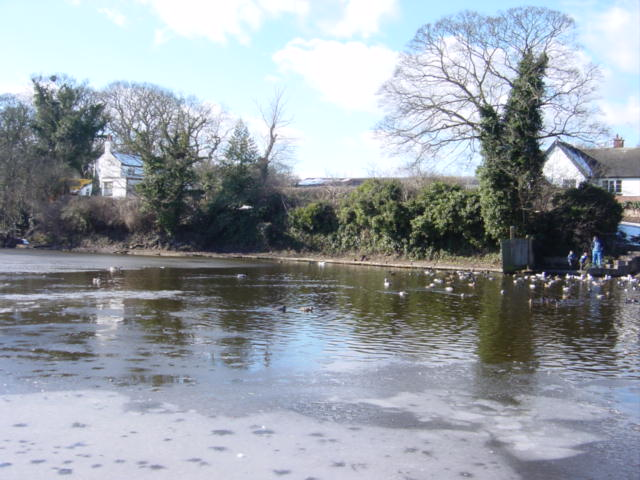
- Ice and ducks on Raby Mere

- Location within Merseyside
- Population: 750 (2011 Census)
- OS grid reference: SJ336808
  - London: 174 mi (280 km) SE
- Metropolitan borough: Wirral
- Metropolitan county: Merseyside
- Region: North West
- Country: England
- Sovereign state: United Kingdom
- Post town: WIRRAL
- Postcode district: CH63 0
- Dialling code: 0151
- ISO 3166 code: GB-WRL
- Police: Merseyside
- Fire: Merseyside
- Ambulance: North West
- UK Parliament: Wirral West

Raby Mere is a hamlet on the Wirral Peninsula, England. Adjacent to the Green Belt, woodland and open countryside, it is known for its mere, a lake that has been used for leisure purposes for many years. The hamlet of Raby is located two miles (three kilometres) west.

Since local government reorganisation on 1 April 1974, Raby Mere has been situated administratively within the Metropolitan Borough of Wirral. It is in the Clatterbridge Ward in the parliamentary constituency of Wirral South. At the time of the 2011 Census, Raby Mere, with its small residential area of exclusively detached homes, had a total population of 750.

== Geography ==
Raby Mere is in the south-eastern part of the Wirral Peninsula, approximately 13 km (8 mi) south-southeast of the Irish Sea at Wallasey, about 7.5 km (4 3/4 mi) east of the Dee Estuary at Gayton and about 3.5 km (2 1/4 mi) west of the River Mersey at Eastham. The mere is at an elevation of around 24 m (79 ft) above sea level.

== Community ==
The parish churches are All Saints Church, Thornton Hough and St George's Church, Thornton Hough. The local primary school is Thornton Hough Primary.

== Transport ==
=== Road ===
The M53 motorway runs along the western side of Raby Mere. The nearest access point is at Junction 4 of the motorway, about two kilometres (1 1/4 mi) north.

=== Bus ===
The hamlet is served by the Number 84 bus that runs Mondays to Saturdays every two hours during the day from Heswall to Raby Mere via Clatterbridge, Spital and Bromborough run by Avon Buses.
