= Municipal Borough of Bebington =

Former local government area in the UK

Bebington Bebington and Bromborough (1922–1933)
- Urban district (1922–1937); Municipal borough (1937–1974)
- Bebington Municipal Borough within Cheshire in 1970
- Area
  - 1931: 12,284 acres
  - Coordinates: 53.350°N 3.003°W
- Population
  - 1931: 31,877
- History
  - Created: 1922
  - Abolished: 1974
  - Succeeded by: Metropolitan Borough of Wirral
- Government
  - HQ: Lower Bebington
  - Motto: Civitatis Fortuna Cives - The fortune of the state depends on the citizens.

Bebington was a local government district on the Wirral Peninsula, in Cheshire, England.

It was the local authority for the towns of Bebington and Bromborough. New Ferry and Port Sunlight were also within its boundaries. The district included the civil parishes of Bebington-cum-Bromborough, Brimstage, Eastham, Poulton cum Spital, Raby, Storeton and Thornton Hough.

There had previously been three local government districts in the area: Higher Bebington (created 1859), Lower Bebington (created 1863), and Bromborough (created 1873), each of which were converted into urban districts under the Local Government Act 1894. The three districts were merged into a single Bebington and Bromborough Urban District in 1922.

Bebington and Bromborough Urban District was renamed Bebington in 1933, when its territory was also significantly enlarged to take in the surrounding parishes of Storeton, Poulton cum Spital, Brimstage, Thornton Hough, Raby, and Eastham. The urban district was raised to the status of a municipal borough in 1937.

The council was granted a coat of arms on 3 January 1934. The shield featured two wheatsheaves, an emblem of the county of Cheshire, and a ship to represent the borough's proximity to the River Mersey and the Manchester Ship Canal. The saltire of St. Andrew in the upper-centre depicts the dedication of Bebington parish church. Bromborough Cross is featured at the top of the crest.

On 1 April 1974, under the Local Government Act 1972, the municipal borough was abolished and its area was absorbed into the Metropolitan Borough of Wirral, in the metropolitan county of Merseyside.
