= Crusaders Australia =

Team information
- City: Melbourne, Australia
- Founded: 1977
- Official website: crusaderscricketaustralia.com.au

Crusaders Australia is a wandering cricket team founded by Swan Richards OAM, David Richards OAM and the late Ray Steele and the former Australian wicket keeper, late Ben Barnett in 1977 who undertake bi-annual tours around to help facilitate the development of promising Australian cricketers and the Outright foundation which helps the youth development and the long form of the game, that is Test Cricket by pairing these young men with and against some first class players. They play against some of the major schools around Melbourne every week.

They have been represented since by more than 2500 players, in more than 1500 games on numerous tours to England and Europe. Current players to have come through the Crusaders system include Clinton McKay, Rob Quiney and Aiden Blizzard, Simon O'Donnell, Peter McIntyre, Darren Barry, Damien Fleming, Shane Warne, Paul Reiffel, and Matthew Elliott also having graduated from the Crusaders. Some English players like Chris Schofield, Paul Collingwood, Vikram Solanki, Jamie Dalrymple have also played for The Crusaders while they were on ECB / Crusaders scholarship.

In Australia, Crusaders have played against the national teams of England, Pakistan, South Africa and New Zealand over the years.

The Crusaders have played matches in Hong Kong Singapore, France, Austria, Slovenia and Belgium in recent years. They have also played against prestigious teams in the UK including Marylebone Cricket Club, Royal Household Cricket Club and Welsh side Carmel & District Cricket Club.

== See also ==
- List of cricket clubs in Australia
