= Listed buildings in Thornton Hough =

Thornton Hough is a village in Wirral, Merseyside, England. It contains 40 buildings that are recorded in the National Heritage List for England as designated listed buildings. Of these, three are listed at Grade II*, the middle of the three grades, and the others are at Grade II, the lowest grade. The village was developed into a model village in the second half of the 19th century and the early 20th century by two industrialists, first by Joseph Hirst, a textile manufacturer from Yorkshire, and later by Lord Leverhulme, the soap manufacturer who also created the model village of Port Sunlight. Most of the listed buildings were constructed for them, including the two churches. The only listed building pre-dating the works of the industrialists are a public house, and Thornton Manor, which was greatly expanded by Lord Leverhulme.

== Key ==
Grade	Criteria
II*	Particularly important buildings of more than special interest
II	Buildings of national importance and special interest

== Buildings ==
Name and location	Photograph	Date	Notes	Grade
Seven Stars public house and 1–2 Church Road; 53.32103°N 3.04437°W		Early 19th century	A public house with two attached houses. The public house is roughcast with stone dressings and a slate roof, it is in two storeys with a three-bay front. The ground floor windows are casements, and in the upper floor they are sashes. The entrance porch is gabled. The houses each have one bay; No. 1 has horizontally-sliding sash windows, and No. 2 has casements and a 20th-century porch.	II
Thornton Manor; 53.32768°N 3.05176°W		c. 1840s–1850s	Originally a Victorian country house, it was enlarged for Lord Leverhulme by Jonathan Simpson in about 1891, by Douglas and Fordham and by Grayson and Ould in about 1896, in 1899–1902 by J. J. Talbot, and in 1912–14 by J. Lomax-Simpson. It is built in sandstone with stone-slate roofs, it is mainly in three storeys with a basement, and is in Jacobean style. The house has a complex irregular plan, and has been converted into a venue for weddings and conferences.	II*
All Saints Vicarage; 53.32055°N 3.04509°W	—	c. 1866–68	The vicarage was designed by John Kirk and Sons. It is in stone with a tiled roof, in two storeys with an attic, and three bays. The first bay projects forward and is gabled, there is a gabled dormer in the third bay, and the windows are sashes.	II
Copley; 53.32537°N 3.05107°W	—	c. 1866–68	A country house for Stephen Williamson, in sandstone with slate roofs, and in Scottish Baronial style. The house has an L-shaped plan, it is in two storeys with attics and a basement, and has a northwest four-storey tower. Many of its interior features have been retained.	II
Copley Cottages; 53.32577°N 3.05034°W	—	c. 1866–68	The cottages are at the entrance to the estate yard. They are in sandstone with slate roofs, in Gothic style with Scottish Baronial influences, and have two storeys. The windows are mullioned and contain sashes. The attached estate walls are included in the listing.	II
School and master's house 53.32077°N 3.04419°W	—	c. 1866–68	The former school and attached house are by John Kirk and Sons, and later used as a community centre. The building is in stone with slate roofs and a tiled crest. There are five bays and a projecting porch wing. The first bay has one storey and the others are in a single storey. The first and fifth bays have coped gables with iron finials, and above the central window is a gablet.	II
Copley Lodge; 53.32454°N 3.04966°W	—	1867	The lodge is in sandstone with a slate roof and is in Gothic style. It has n L-shaped plan and is in 1 1/2 storeys. Each front is gabled, the entrance is in the angle, and the windows are sashes. Above the entrance is shield containing the date. The attached wall is included in the listing.	II
All Saints Church; 53.32028°N 3.04450°W		1867–68	The church was built for Joseph Hirst and designed by John Kirk and Sons in Geometrical style. It is in sandstone and has a slate roof with a tiled ridge. The church has a cruciform plan, and consists of a nave, a porch, south transepts, a chancel with a north organ loft and a south vestry, and a southwest steeple. The steeple has a tower with five clock faces, pinnacles, and a broach spire with two tiers of lucarnes.	II
The Stores, 1–6 Wilshaw Terrace and Rowan Cottage; 53.32113°N 3.04407°W		1870	A terrace of seven houses and a shop on a corner site by John Kirk and Sons for Joseph Hirst. They are in stone with slate roofs, and have two storeys. There are seven bays on Church Road, a two-bay shop on Thornton Common Road, and a turret on the corner between them. The turret is round, it is in two storeys containing roundels with the date and the initials "JH", and has a cornice on brackets and a conical roof. The shop has two shop fronts and a single-storey turret to the left. In the terrace the windows have segmental pointed heads, they contain sashes, and in the upper floor they are in coped gablets. The end bay is lower, it has a canted bay window, and a 20th-century dormer.	II
1 and 2 Manor Cottages; 53.32930°N 3.05212°W	—	c. 1873	A pair of semi-detached cottages in sandstone with a Welsh slate roof and a terracotta ridge crest. They are in 1 1/2 storeys and have a symmetrical two-bay front. The ground floor windows are mullioned and transomed, and the upper floor windows are in dormers with gables containing bargeboards and lattice fretwork. The boundary wall is included in the listing.	II
3 Manor Cottages; 53.32814°N 3.05218°W	—	c. 1891	The cottage in the estate of Thornton Manor is in sandstone with a slate roof. It consists of a two-storey cottage with a single-storey extension. The cottage has three bays, a central doorway with a fanlight, and sash windows, those in the upper storey in gabled dormers. The extension has a hipped roof, and on the front is a doorway, a sash window, and a mullioned window.	II
1 and 3 The Folds; 53.31982°N 3.04484°W	—	c. 1892	Two houses by Grayson and Ould; they are timber-framed on a stone base, and have roofs of stone-slate and tile. The houses have three bays, the first two bays with a single storey, and the third bay with two storeys and a jettied gable. The windows are casements. There is a canopy above the doorway, and an oriel window in the third bay.	II
5–11 The Folds; 53.31960°N 3.04497°W	—	c. 1892	A terrace of four houses by Grayson and Ould in two storeys. They are in brick with stone dressings, the upper storey is timber-framed, and the roofs are tiled. The outer bays have canted bay windows, jettied gables with pargetting, and decorated bressumers and bargeboards. The ground floor windows are mullioned, and in the upper floor they are casements.	II
13 and 15 The Folds; 53.31958°N 3.04526°W	—	c. 1892	Two houses by Grayson and Ould, partly timber-framed on a stone base, and partly in stone, with a hipped tile roof. They are in one storey with attics and have a two-bay front. The first bay projects forward, and has a canted oriel window in the ground floor, a four-light window above, and a jettied gable. The second bay contains a mullioned window in the ground floor, and a gabled half-dormer above.	II
17–23 The Folds; 53.31938°N 3.04534°W	—	c. 1892	A terrace of four houses by Grayson and Ould. They are partly timber-framed on a stone base, and partly in stone, the gables are shingled, and the roofs are tiled. The houses have one storey and attics, and are in four bays, the outer bays projecting forward with jettied gables, and with canted oriel windows in the upper floor. The other bays have jettied gabled dormers, and in the ground floor the windows are mullioned.	II
25 and 27 The Folds; 53.31935°N 3.04564°W	—	c. 1892	Two houses by Grayson and Ould with one storey and attics, two bays, and tiled roofs. The first bay is timber-framed and has casement windows and a jettied gable with decorated bargeboards. The second bay is in brick with stone dressings. In the ground floor is a mullioned window, and above is a canted oriel window in a gabled half-dormer.	II
1 Neston Road; 53.32071°N 3.04603°W	—	1893	A timber-framed house on a stone base with a tiled roof by Douglas and Fordham. It has two storeys and an attic, and each front has two bays. The upper floor and the gables are jettied, and the gables have decorative brackets, bressumers and bargeboards. The main gable has a finial consisting of a figure holding a weathervane. The windows are casements, and the chimney stack has a zig-zag pattern.	II
2 Neston Road; 53.32071°N 3.04603°W	—	1893	A house by Douglas and Fordham in brick with stone dressings and a tiled roof. It has two storeys and a three-bay front, and has a shaped gable with a finial. The windows have elliptical heads, hood moulds, and plastered tympani, and contain casements. Above the door is a canopy on brackets.	II
3 and 4 Neston Road; 53.32067°N 3.04615°W	—	1893	A pair of houses by Douglas and Fordham in two storeys and three bays. The lower floor is in stone, the upper floor is jettied and pargetted, and the roof is in stone-slate. The central doorway has a four-centred arch with carved spandrels. Flanking it are bay windows, and in the upper floor are a central casement window and canted oriel windows.	II
5 Neston Road; 53.32064°N 3.04626°W	—	1893	A timber-framed house on a stone base with a tiled roof by Douglas and Fordham. It has two storeys and an attic, and a single-bay front. The first floor and the gable are jettied. In the ground floor is a canted oriel window, and an entrance with a Tudor arched head. Above there are decorative bressumers and bargeboards.	II
6 and 7 Neston Road; 53.32061°N 3.04640°W	—	1893	Two houses by Douglas and Fordham, each of which has two storeys, two bays and mullioned windows. The ground floor of No. 6 is in stone and the upper storey is in brick. The right bay projects forward under a shaped gable and contains a datestone. No. 7 is in brick with some diapering, both bays project forward under a gable.	II
Hesketh Grange; 53.32310°N 3.04933°W	—	1894	A house by Grayson and Ould for the family of Lord Leverhulme, with two storeys and an L-shaped plan. The ground floor is in stone, the upper floor is heavily pargetted, and the roof is in stone-slate. The windows in the ground floor are mullioned, and those in the upper floor are casements. On the entrance front are gables, one of which contains an oriel window.	II
North Lodge and stables, Hesketh Grange; 53.32370°N 3.04871°W	—	1894	The lodge and stables were designed by Grayson and Ould. The lodge has a front of two bays, it is in one storey with an attic, the ground floor is in stone, the upper parts are timber-framed, and the roof is tiled. It has a gabled porch, casement windows, a bay window and gabled dormers. The stables are in two storeys and four bays. The upper storey is plastered, and the roof is in stone-slate. There are mullioned windows and gabled dormers.	II
South Lodge, Hesketh Grange; 53.32274°N 3.04807°W	—	1894	The lodge was designed by Grayson and Ould, and is in stone with a shingle roof. It has one storey and an attic, with two bays on the fronts and one bay on the sides. The windows are casements, one on the ground floor being mullioned, and those in the upper floor in gabled dormers.	II
Thornton House; 53.32070°N 3.04246°W	—	1895	A house, later divided into five apartments, rebuilt by Grayson and Ould, and extended in 1906 by J. Lomax-Simpson. It is in two storeys, the lower storey in stone, the upper storey partly timber-framed, and the roofs in stone-slate. The house has an L-shaped plan, the main block having a garden front of seven bays, and the service block with six bays. The entrance is recessed, and is round-headed. Some windows are mullioned, others are transomed. Other features include jettied gables, oriel windows, a balcony, and a bay window.	II
North Lodge, Thornton House; 53.32225°N 3.04301°W	—	1895	The lodge by Grayson and Ould is timber-framed on a stone base and has a stone-slate roof. It has one storey and an attic, the upper parts being jettied, and there are two bays. The ground floor windows are canted oriels with transoms, and the upper storey contains gabled dormers with jettied gables. The entrance is in a gabled porch.	II
South Lodge, Thornton House; 53.32137°N 3.04399°W	—	1895	The lodge by Grayson and Ould has one storey and an attic, a three-bay front, and a tiled gambrel roof. The ground floor is in bands of red and buff stone, and the first bay contains a round-headed window. The second bay is canted, its attic is shingled, and it has a pyramidal roof. The third bay projects forward, it has a canted bay window in the ground floor, above which is a jettied timber-framed gable containing a mullioned and transomed window. On the left side is a timber-framed gable and a round-headed entrance.	II
Stables, Thornton House; 53.32119°N 3.04359°W	—	1895	The former stables, later converted into two houses, are by Grayson and Ould, in red and buff stone, and with tiled roofs. They consist of a main block with one storey and attics, and two single-storey wings. The windows are casements and some are mullioned. The main block has dormers with coped gables. Elsewhere is a former carriage entrance, a dormer with a pyramidal roof, and a round turret with a conical roof.	II
1–6 Manor Road; 53.32102°N 3.04598°W	—	1890s	A terrace of six houses by William and Segar Owen. They have two storeys with an irregular plan, they are built partly in stone and partly in timber framing, and have tiled roofs. The designs of the houses varies; some have mullioned windows, some are gabled, and some have porches with Tuscan columns.	II
2 Raby Road; 53.31966°N 3.04452°W	—	1890s	A timber-framed house by Grayson and Ould, standing on a stone base, and with a stone-slate roof. It is in a single storey with two bays. There is a central gabled porch containing a bench. Flanking it are canted oriel windows.	II
3 Raby Road; 53.31966°N 3.04452°W	—	1890s	A timber-framed house by Grayson and Ould, standing on a stone base, and with a stone-slate roof. It is in a single storey with two bays. There is a central gabled porch containing a bench. Flanking it are canted oriel windows with hipped shingled roofs.	II
4 and 5 Raby Road; 53.31959°N 3.04431°W	—	1890s	Two houses by Grayson and Ould on a corner site. They are timber-framed on a stone base, and have stone-slate roofs. The houses are in a single storey, and have fronts of two and three bays. No. 4 has a central gabled porch containing a bench. No. 5 has close studding and a jettied gable.	II
Laundry, Thornton Manor; 53.32819°N 3.05146°W	—	1901	The former laundry is in sandstone with a slate roof and terracotta ridge copings. The front has three bays and a Tudor arched doorway. The windows are mullioned, two to the left of the doorway, and one to the right, above which is a gabled dormer. In the gable are inscribed initials and the date.	II
Village Club and Post Office; 53.32086°N 3.04501°W		c. 1904	Originally the Liberal Club, and later a shop and a club, it is by Grayson and Ould. The building is timber-framed on a stone base with stone-slate roofs, it has two storeys, and is in a U-shaped plan, with two wings joined by a screen. The wings contain large four-light canted bay windows in the ground floor. The upper floor is jettied and gabled, with five-light casement windows. The doorways have Tudor arches.	II
Smithy; 53.32036°N 3.04729°W		1905	The smithy is by J. Lomax-Simpson and stands on a road junction. It is timber-framed on a stone base and has a hipped stone-slate roof with gablets. The smithy is in a single storey and has four bays, the middle two bays being recessed. The first bay contains a three-light window, and in the fourth bay is a projecting five-light window.	II
1–4 Raby Road; 53.31937°N 3.04379°W	—	1906	A terrace of four houses by J. Lomax-Simpson in two storeys and five bays and with a slate roof. The first bay is in stone, it projects forward and is gabled, and has a two-storey bay window. The second and third bays are roughcast with a jettied upper storey, There are casement windows in the ground floor and half-dormers above. The fourth bay has a jettied gable, a canted ground floor and an oriel window above, and the fifth bay is in stone with a canted angle.	II
St George's Church; 53.32115°N 3.04550°W		1906–07	A Congregational church by J. Lomax-Simpson for Lord Leverhulme in Neo-Norman style. It is in sandstone with stone-slate roofs, and has a cruciform plan consisting of a nave, transepts, a chancel with an apse and a porch, a vestry, and a tower over the crossing. The tower has buttresses, blind arcading, a corbelled parapet, a pyramidal roof, and an octagonal stair turret.	II*
Stone shelter, St George's Church; 53.32088°N 3.04555°W		1906–07	The shelter was designed by J. Lomax-Simpson, it is in stone, and has a stone-slate roof. The shelter has a hexagonal plan, clasping buttresses, and six round-headed arches. At the top is a corbel table, a parapet, and a pyramidal roof. Inside is a ribbed dome, and a central boss carved with a dragon.	II
Gatehouse and walls, Thornton Manor; 53.32735°N 3.05092°W		1910	The gatehouse was designed by J. Lomax-Simpson. It is in two storeys and has three bays, with an entry in the ground floor of the middle bay. The ground floor is in sandstone, the upper floor is timber-framed, and there is a stone-slate roof. In the ground floor, the outer bays are canted and contain mullioned windows. In the central bay of the upper floor is an oriel window, above it is a gable with carved bargeboards, and in the outer bays are mullioned windows. The attached walls contain gate piers with ball finials.	II*
War memorial 53.32119°N 3.04469°W	—	1921	The war memorial is in the churchyard of St George's Church. It is in red sandstone, and consists of a wheel-headed cross that has a tall tapering shaft, with a stepped cap, chamfered corners, and a moulded base. The fronts of the cross and the shaft are carved with a Celtic knot design. The shaft stands on a two-stepped plinth on a base of three steps, and at the foot of the cross is a bronze plaque with an inscription and the names of those lost in the First World War. Around the base of cross are Darley Dale slabs surrounded by a low sandstone wall.	II
