= Brimstage Hall and Tower =

Historic site in Brimstage, Wirral, England

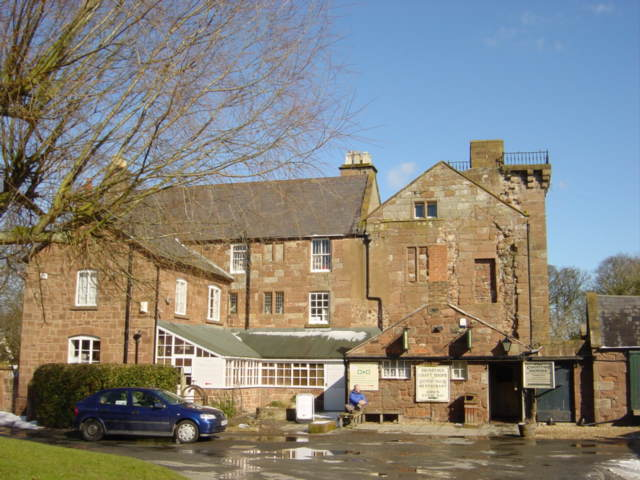
- Coordinates: 53.336602°N 3.046332°W
- Built: c. 1398

Listed Building – Grade I
- Designated: 27 December 1962
- Reference no.: 1183702

Brimstage Hall and Tower is a Grade I listed 14th century building located in Brimstage, Wirral, England. The building is composed of a 16th-century hall; rebuilt on the site of a former 12th century hall, as well as a connecting tower built in 1398. Today the area has been redeveloped, with the building's courtyard converted into restaurants and gift shops.

== History ==
The exact date of the site's construction is unknown as well as its original purpose, however estimates suggest it was built some time between 1175 and 1350 and contained a moat with high embankments. Sir Hugh Hulse and his wife Marjory are recorded as the hall's first occupants with documents showing the granting of permission for the construction of a tower on 11 February 1398.

In 1432, the estate was inherited by the Troutbeck family, with Sir William Troutbeck occupying Brimstage Hall and later dying in the War of the Roses. In 2014 the site was redeveloped into a shopping area and now includes a series of shops, restaurants and a maize maze.

== Cheshire Cat ==
In a vaulted chamber at the base of the tower, which was possibly used as a chapel, there is a roughly-cut corbel which resembles a smiling cat, although it may actually be a red lion rampant.

In his memoirs, Lewis Carroll wrote that he "saw a Cheshire cat with a gigantic smile at Brimstage carved into the wall". This is therefore believed to be the inspiration for the Cheshire Cat character in his book Alice's Adventures in Wonderland.
