= Brimstage =

Coordinates: 53.3316°N 3.0622°W

- Village
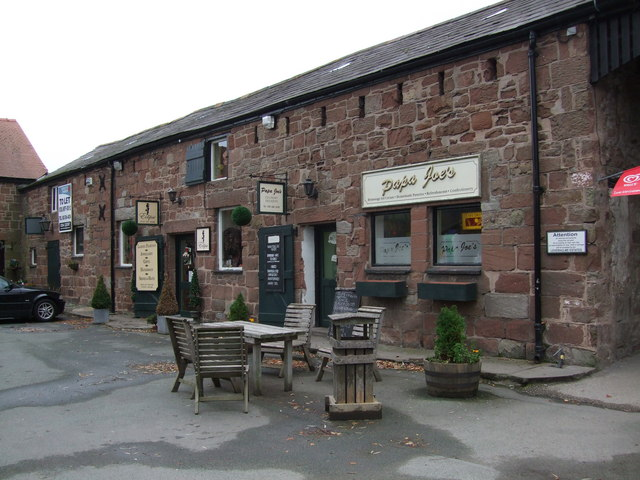
- Brimstage Craft Centre

- Location within Merseyside
- Population: 100 (2001 census)
- OS grid reference: SJ304826
  - London: 177 mi (285 km) SE
- Metropolitan borough: Wirral
- Metropolitan county: Merseyside
- Region: North West
- Country: England
- Sovereign state: United Kingdom
- Post town: WIRRAL
- Postcode district: CH63
- Dialling code: 0151
- ISO 3166 code: GB-WRL
- Police: Merseyside
- Fire: Merseyside
- Ambulance: North West
- UK Parliament: Wirral West

Brimstage (locally /ˈbrɪmstɪdʒ/) is a village and former civil parish in the Wirral district, in the county of Merseyside, England. It is in the centremost part of the Wirral Peninsula, approximately 3 miles (4.8 km) east of Heswall and 3 miles (4.8 km) south west of Bebington. Administratively, it is within the Clatterbridge Ward and is in the parliamentary constituency of Wirral South.

At the time of the 2001 census, Brimstage had a population of 100.

== History ==
The name Brimstage likely means "Bruna's place or riverbank"; the Old English word stæð meaning a river-bank, shore or landing place. Over time, the name has been spelt as Brunestathe (1260), Brimstache (1275), Brunstach (1326), Bronstathe (1348) and Brynstat (1387).

In 1288, Sir Roger de Domville is said to have 'listened for the word Brunstath' (an old name for Brimstage, which he held as lord) during proceedings at Chester. The Domvilles were a Cheshire family of some standing, owning land in Oxton, as well as Brimstage. The Domville family left the village when the Hulse family took residence, circa 1378.

The population has been recorded as 127 in 1801, 126 in 1851, peaking at 181 in 1901 and reducing to 135 in 1951.

There were two pubs in Brimstage, the 'Red Cat' and the 'Pig and Whistle'. The 'Red Cat' was knocked down and never rebuilt while the 'Pig and Whistle' is thought to have been the now named Rose Cottage adjacent to the Pig and Whistle field.

== Geography ==
Brimstage is in the central part of the Wirral Peninsula, approximately 10 km (6.2 mi) south-south-east of the Irish Sea at Leasowe Lighthouse, about 4.5 km (2.8 mi) east-north-east of the Dee Estuary at Gayton and about 4.5 km (2.8 mi) west-north-west of the River Mersey at Port Sunlight. The village is situated at an elevation of around 40 m (130 ft) above sea level.

== Governance ==
Brimstage was formerly a township in the parish of Bromborough, of the Wirral Hundred. It became a civil parish in 1866. Historically within the county of Cheshire, it was part of the Wirral Rural District between 1894 and 1933, subsequently moving within the boundaries of a jurisdiction that would become the Municipal Borough of Bebington. Further changes occurred on 1 April 1974, when local government reorganisation resulted in most of Wirral, including Brimstage, transfer from Cheshire to the newly formed county of Merseyside, the civil parish was abolished on 1 April 1974.

As of 2026, Brimstage is within the Clatterbridge Ward of the Metropolitan Borough of Wirral. The village is represented nationally through the parliamentary constituency of Wirral South.

== Landmarks ==
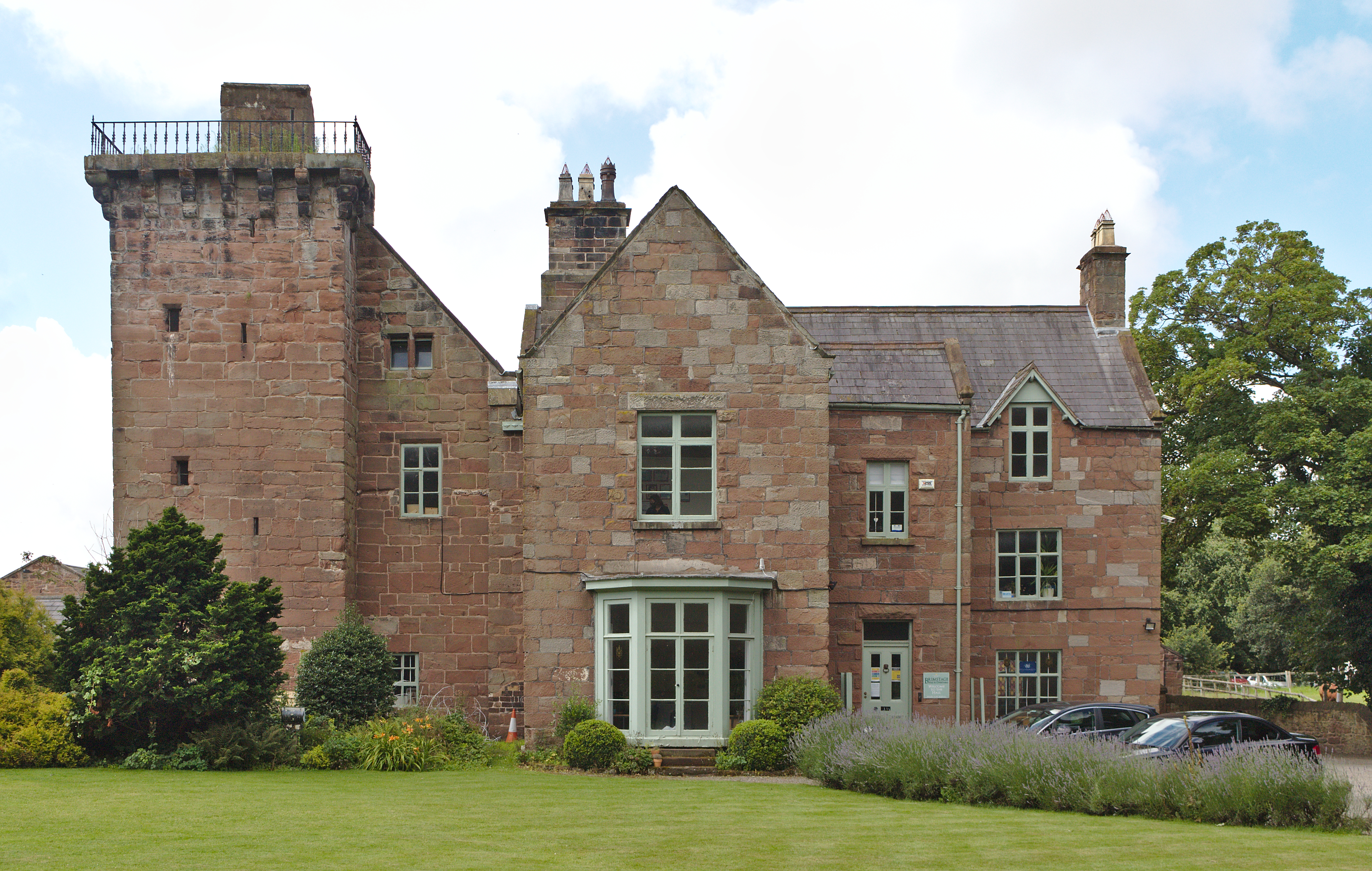
Brimstage Hall and Tower

Although the exact date of construction is unknown, Brimstage Hall is believed to have been built between the 12th century and 14th century, making it one of the oldest buildings on Merseyside. Originally the site was enclosed by a moat and high embankment. The building's first known occupants were Sir Hugh Hulse and his wife, who were granted the right to construct a private chapel in 1398. Further modifications were made in during the 16th century, with a north wing added in the 19th century. The building was designated Grade I listed building in 1962.

== Community ==
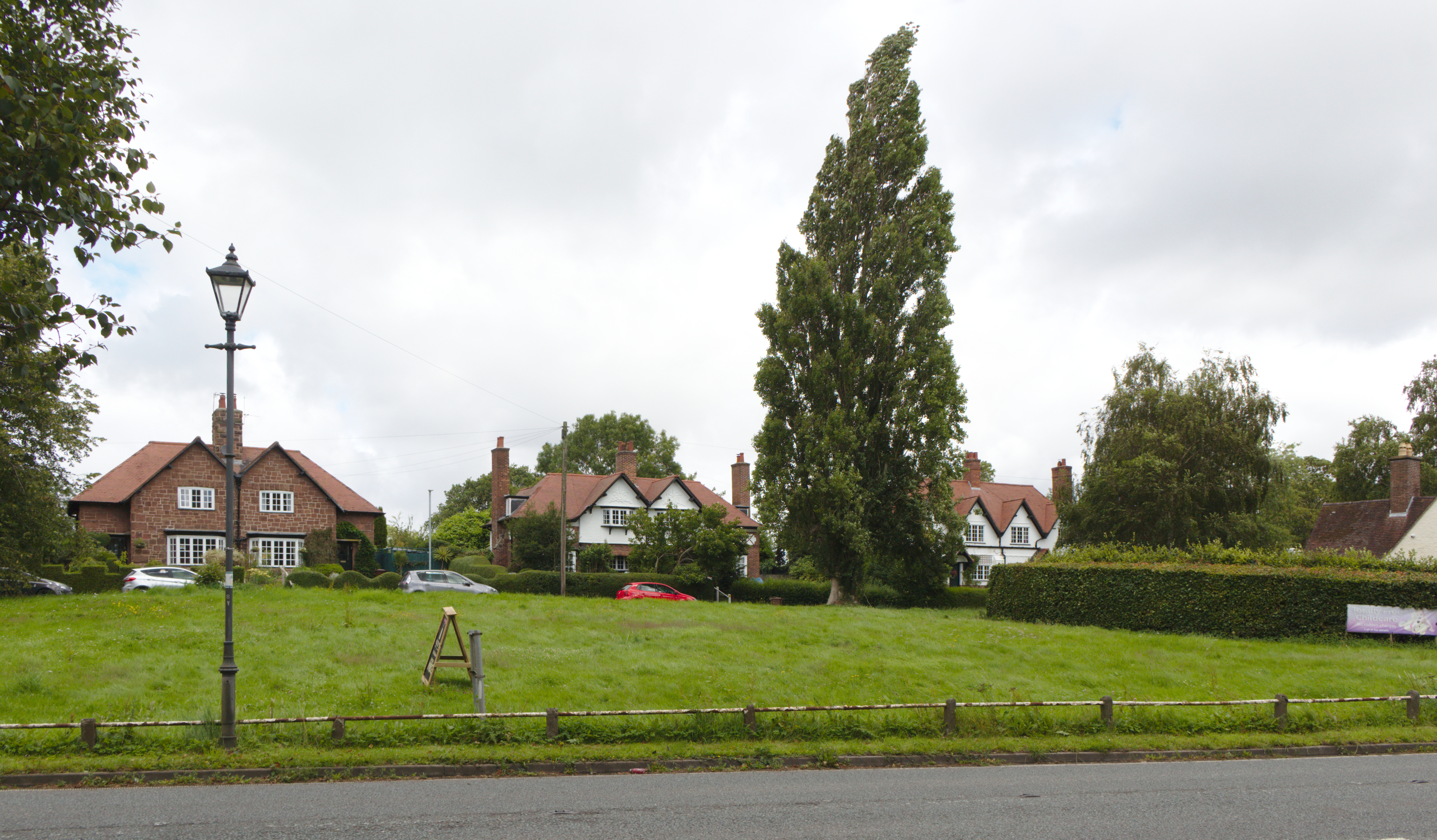
Brimstage village green

Brimstage is a rural community centred on a small village green, consisting of Brimstage Hall, numerous farms and a small number of dwellings. The hall's courtyard hosts a vibrant retail community. The Brimstage Maze site includes a 7 acre maze, several outdoor activities for children and an indoor soft play area.

In 2006 the former dairy at Home farm was refurbished to become the home of Brimstage Brewery - Wirral's first commercial brewery since the closure of Birkenhead Brewery in the 1960s.

Brimstage, along with the neighbouring villages of Raby and Thornton Hough, are within an Area of Special Landscape Value, a protective designation to preserve the character and appearance of the area. This is part of the Wirral Unitary Development Plan.

== Transport ==
The village is on the A5137 Brimstage Road, to the west of junction 4 of the M53 motorway.

Bus services operating along Brimstage Road and Talbot Avenue to the west of the village, as of 2015:

Number	Route	Operator	Days of operation
85	Clatterbridge Hospital - Heswall	Avon Buses	Monday - Saturday
86	Heswall - Mill Park	Avon Buses	Monday-Saturday evenings
87	Heswall - Eastham Ferry	Avon Buses	Sunday
113	New Ferry - Heswall	A2B Travel	Monday-Saturday early evenings
113	Heswall - Clatterbridge Hospital	A2B Travel	Once a Monday-Saturday evening

== Bibliography ==
- Mortimer, William Williams (1847). The History of the Hundred of Wirral. London: Whittaker & Co. pp210-212.
