= European Twenty20 Championship =

The European Twenty20 Championship is a cricket tournament played for the first time in July 2007 in Belfast, Northern Ireland. It was the first international Twenty20 tournament ahead of the inaugural Twenty20 World Championship later in the same year.

The event took place from 20 July to 22 July 2007 and the participating teams were Denmark, Ireland, the Netherlands and Scotland.

The inaugural tournament, scheduled for July 2007, was actually cancelled just 2 months before the staging of the event. The cancellation was a result of the ODI series between the Netherlands, Ireland and the West Indies, due to take place immediately before the European Twenty20 Championship, being extended to include Scotland. As a result of most of the participating players being amateurs and needing to request leave from their respective professions it was decided to cancel the tournament.

An innovative European Twenty20 tournament was staged at Carmel & District Cricket Club in July 2008. This eight-team tournament was supported by the International Cricket Council and featured representative international teams from Czech Republic, Slovakia, Croatia, Russia and Estonia as well as the hosts and a Cricket Board of Wales team.

The tournament was won by Estonia who defeated the Czech Republic in the final. The event is also scheduled to be staged at Carmel again in July 2009.
