= Listed buildings in Raby, Merseyside =

Raby is a village in Wirral, Merseyside, England. It contains eight buildings that are recorded in the National Heritage List for England as designated listed buildings, all of which are listed at Grade II. This grade is the lowest of the three gradings given to listed buildings and is applied to "buildings of national importance and special interest". The listed buildings consist of farmhouses, farm buildings, cottages, and a public house.

Name and location	Photograph	Date	Notes
Jasmine Cottage; 53.31032°N 3.03571°W	—	1611	A stone cottage with one storey and an attic. It has four bays, the first two bays thatched and the third and fourth, which are extensions, with a slate roof, the third bay being taller. The windows are casements.
Wheatsheaf Inn; 53.31147°N 3.03554°W		1611	A timber-framed public house with brick infill on a stone base, and with a thatched roof. It is in one storey with attics, and has a two-bay front with a lower two-bay outbuilding to the right. The windows are casements, and in the attic are eyebrow dormers.
Building, White House Farm; 53.31153°N 3.03638°W	—	17th century	Originally a timber-framed cottage, later encased in sandstone, brick and render. It has 1 1/2 storeys and a corrugated iron roof. The windows include a four-light casement.
Pear Tree Cottage; 53.31369°N 3.03463°W	—	17th century	A stone house with a thatched roof, it is in a single storey, and has two bays and a rear wing. The windows are casements.
Corner Farm Farmhouse; 53.31147°N 3.03554°W	—	1723	A brick farmhouse with a tiled roof, it is in one storey with an attic and has a three-bay front, the left bay being gabled. The windows in the ground floor are sashes, and in the upper floor they are casements, those in the central and right bays being in gabled half-dormers. The doorway in the central bay has a fanlight.
Farm building, Corner Farm; 53.31120°N 3.03554°W	—	18th century	The farm building is in brick on a stone base, it has a stone wing at the right end and a slate roof. The north end is a barn, and the rest contains stables. They contain entrances and ventilation holes.
Chicken Corner Farm; 53.31624°N 3.02458°W		18th century	A stone house with a thatched roof in a single storey with attics and two bays. It contains two doorways and casement windows, those in the attics in eyebrow dormers. To the left is a two-bay single-storey stone outbuilding with a slate roof.
Stanacres; 53.31806°N 3.03397°W	—	1849–51	A country house in Gothic style by Charles Verelst, later divided into two houses. It is in sandstone with slate roof, and has 2 1/2 storeys and gables of differing sizes. The entrance front has three bays with a central porch. Most of the windows are sashes, some are mullioned and transomed, and there are casement dormers and a bay window.
