= CH postcode area =

Postcode area within the United Kingdom

Chester
- Postcode area
- Coordinates: 53.293°N 3.024°W
- Country: United Kingdom
- Postcode area: CH
- Postcode area name: Chester
- Post towns: 13
- Postcode districts: 37
- Postcode sectors: 213
- Postcodes (live): 18,790
- Postcodes (total): 24,203
- Statistics as at May 2020

The CH postcode area, also known as the Chester postcode area, is a group of 37 postcode districts in North West England and North East Wales. Together the districts cover west Cheshire, the Wirral part of Merseyside, and east Flintshire. Its thirteen post towns are Bagillt, Birkenhead, Buckley, Chester, Deeside, Ellesmere Port, Flint, Holywell, Mold, Neston, Prenton, Wallasey, and Wirral.

The postcodes for the Wirral Peninsula were originally covered by the L postcode area, until they were transferred to the CH postcode area in 1999. The postcode numbers were unchanged, for example L41 became CH41.

Mail for the CH postcode area is processed at Chester Mail Centre, along with mail for the LL and SY postcode areas.

== Coverage ==
The approximate coverage of the postcode districts:

| Postcode district | Post town | Coverage | Local authority area(s) |
|---|---|---|---|
| CH1 | CHESTER | Blacon, Chester, Higher Ferry, Capenhurst, Backford | Cheshire West and Chester, Flintshire |
| CH2 | CHESTER | Backford, Chester, Elton, Hoole, Ince, Mickle Trafford, Moston, Newton, Upton-by-Chester | Cheshire West and Chester |
| CH3 | CHESTER | Boughton, Chester, Huntington, Mouldsworth, Tarvin, Tattenhall, Farndon, Waverton, Saighton, Upton-by-Chester | Cheshire West and Chester |
| CH4 | CHESTER | Chester, Curzon Park, Handbridge, Lache, Pulford, Penyffordd, Broughton, Saltney | Cheshire West and Chester, Flintshire |
| CH5 | DEESIDE | Connah's Quay, Shotton, Queensferry, Sealand, Garden City, Sandycroft, Hawarden, Ewloe, Mancot | Flintshire |
| CH6 | BAGILLT | Bagillt | Flintshire |
| CH6 | FLINT | Flint, Oakenholt, Flint Mountain | Flintshire |
| CH7 | BUCKLEY | Buckley | Flintshire, Denbighshire |
| CH7 | MOLD | Mold, Leeswood, Treuddyn, Llanarmon-yn-Ial, Caerwys, Northop Hall | Flintshire, Denbighshire |
| CH8 | HOLYWELL | Holywell, Trelogan, Milwr, Holway, Carmel, Lloc, Bryn Celyn, Greenfield, Halkyn, Lixwm, Talacre | Flintshire |
| CH25 | BIRKENHEAD | PO Boxes | non-geographic |
| CH26 | PRENTON | PO Boxes | non-geographic |
| CH27 | WALLASEY | PO Boxes | non-geographic |
| CH28 | WIRRAL | PO Boxes in Moreton | non-geographic |
| CH29 | WIRRAL | PO Boxes in Hoylake | non-geographic |
| CH30 | WIRRAL | PO Boxes in Upton | non-geographic |
| CH31 | WIRRAL | PO Boxes in Heswall | non-geographic |
| CH32 | WIRRAL | PO Boxes in New Ferry | non-geographic |
| CH33 | NESTON | PO Boxes | non-geographic |
| CH34 | ELLESMERE PORT | PO Boxes | non-geographic |
| CH41 | BIRKENHEAD | Birkenhead, Claughton, Seacombe, Tranmere, Woodside | Wirral |
| CH42 | BIRKENHEAD | Birkenhead, Oxton, Prenton, Rock Ferry | Wirral |
| CH43 | PRENTON | Beechwood, Bidston, Noctorum, Oxton, Prenton | Wirral |
| CH44 | WALLASEY | Egremont, Liscard, Poulton, Seacombe, Wallasey | Wirral |
| CH45 | WALLASEY | New Brighton, Wallasey, Wallasey Village | Wirral |
| CH46 | WIRRAL | Leasowe, Moreton, Saughall Massie | Wirral |
| CH47 | WIRRAL | Hoylake, Meols | Wirral |
| CH48 | WIRRAL | Caldy, Frankby, Grange, Hoylake, Newton, West Kirby | Wirral |
| CH49 | WIRRAL | Greasby, Landican, Saughall Massie, Upton, Woodchurch | Wirral |
| CH60 | WIRRAL | Heswall, Gayton | Wirral |
| CH61 | WIRRAL | Barnston, Heswall (part), Irby, Pensby, Thingwall, Thurstaston | Wirral |
| CH62 | WIRRAL | Bromborough, Eastham, New Ferry, Port Sunlight, Spital | Wirral |
| CH63 | WIRRAL | Brimstage, Bromborough, Clatterbridge, Higher Bebington, Lower Bebington, Raby, Raby Mere, Spital, Storeton, Thornton Hough | Wirral |
| CH64 | NESTON | Parkgate, Neston, Willaston, Little Neston, Ness, Puddington, Burton | Cheshire West and Chester |
| CH65 | ELLESMERE PORT | Ellesmere Port, Great Sutton, Whitby, Wolverham | Cheshire West and Chester |
| CH66 | ELLESMERE PORT | Childer Thornton, Ellesmere Port, Great Sutton, Hooton, Ledsham, Little Sutton, Overpool, Whitby | Cheshire West and Chester |
| CH88 | CHESTER | North West Securities Bank | non-geographic |
| CH90 | ELLESMERE PORT | | non-geographic |
| CH99 | CHESTER | Benefits Agency, St. Michaels Financial Services & Chargecard | non-geographic |

== Map ==
CH postcode area map, showing postcode districts in red and post towns in grey text, with links to nearby CW, L, LL, SY and WA postcode areas.

== See also ==
- List of postcode areas in the United Kingdom
- Postcode Address File
