= All Saints Church, Thornton Hough =

Coordinates: 53.3203°N 3.0445°W

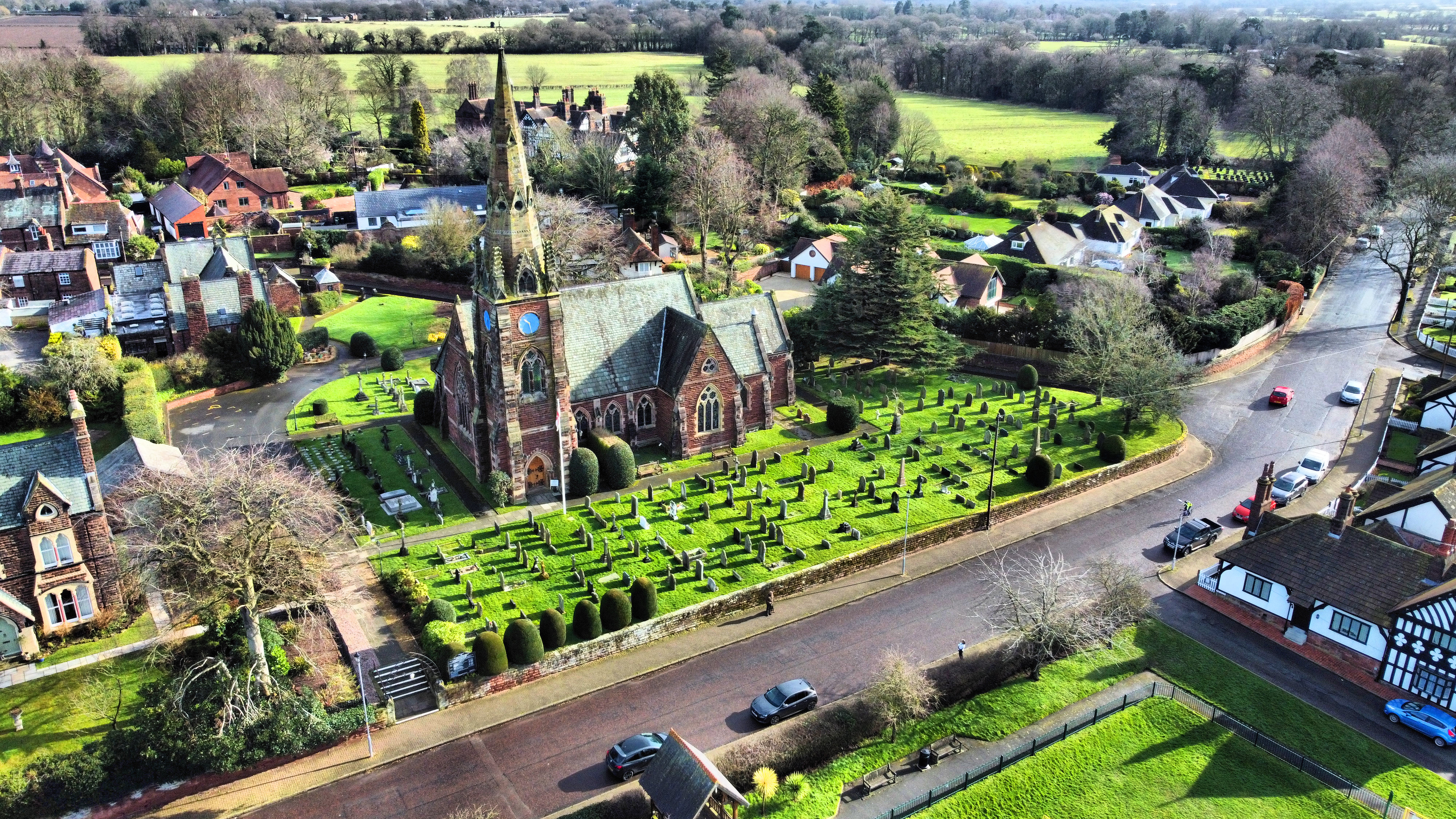

- Location in Merseyside
- OS grid reference: SJ 305 809
- Location: Raby Road, Thornton Hough, Merseyside
- Country: England
- Denomination: Anglican
- Website: www.allsaintsth.org.uk/welcome.htm

History
- Status: Parish church
- Founded: 1867
- Founder: Joseph Hirst
- Consecrated: 5 May 1868

Architecture
- Functional status: Active
- Heritage designation: Grade II
- Designated: 2 October 1986
- Architect(s): John Kirk and Sons
- Architectural type: Church
- Style: Gothic Revival
- Groundbreaking: 1867
- Completed: 1868
- Construction cost: £8,500

Specifications
- Materials: Sandstone, slate roof

Administration
- Province: York
- Diocese: Chester
- Archdeaconry: Chester
- Deanery: Wirral, South
- Parish: All Saints, Thornton Hough

Clergy
- Vicar: Revd Vicky Barrett

All Saints Church is in Raby Road, Thornton Hough, Merseyside, England. It is an active Anglican parish church in the Deanery of Wirral, South, the archdeaconry of Chester, and the diocese of Chester. The church is recorded in the National Heritage List for England as a designated Grade II listed building.

== History ==
All Saints was built in 1867–68, and paid for by Joseph Hirst. It was designed by the Huddersfield architects John Kirk and Sons. Joseph Hirst was a woollen mill owner from Wilshaw near Huddersfield, whose wife came from Chester, and he had bought a house near Thornton Hough as a place to recuperate from his business stresses. He bought land in the village to build the church for £600, and laid its foundation stone in March 1867. The cost of the church, excluding the cost of the land, amounted to about £8,500 (equivalent to £830,000 as of 2025). It was consecrated on 5 May 1868 by the Rt Revd William Jacobson, bishop of Chester. In addition to paying for the building of the church, Hirst also paid for the vicarage, the school, and the school house. In addition he paid for a school and school house at Raby, a village nearby. In the early 20th century a vestry was added by Jonathan Simpson.

== Architecture ==
=== Exterior ===
The church is constructed in rock-faced red sandstone with dressings in lighter stone. It is roofed in slate with a red tile ridge. Its architectural style is Geometrical, and it has a cruciform plan. The church consists of a four-bay nave with a northwest porch, north and south transepts, a chancel with a north organ loft and a south vestry, and a southwest tower with a broach spire. The tower has angle buttresses, two-light windows and clock faces. There is a total of five clock faces, with an additional higher one on the south side because Hirst could not see the lower face from his house. At the top of the tower is a cornice with pinnacles, and two tiers of lucarnes on the spire. The spire rises to a height of 120 feet (37 m) Along the sides of the church is a Lombard frieze, buttresses, and two-light windows containing Geometrical tracery. The west window has five lights. In the transepts are three-light windows with a spherical triangle window above. The chancel has a three-light east window, and two-light windows along the sides. There is a lancet window in the organ loft, and a three-light window in the vestry.

=== Interior ===
Inside the church the font and reredos are in Caen stone, they were both made by T. Ruddock, and they depict biblical scenes. The stained glass includes the east window of 1868 by Clayton and Bell. In the south transept is a window by H. G. Hiller dated 1912, which depicts Saint Michael and angels. The west window is by an unknown artist, it is a war memorial dating from about 1920, and again it depicts Saint Michael. Elsewhere there are windows by Powell's, and by A. R. Fisher (1978), William Davies (1997), and Petri Anderson (2003). In the south transept is an ornate Gothic monument to Joseph Hirst who died in 1874. The original pipe organ was made by Gray and Davison. This was replaced in 1912 by a two-manual organ by Norman and Beard. It was revoiced in 1985 by George Sixsmith.

== See also ==
- Listed buildings in Thornton Hough
