= St George's United Reformed Church, Thornton Hough =

St George's Church, Thornton Hough
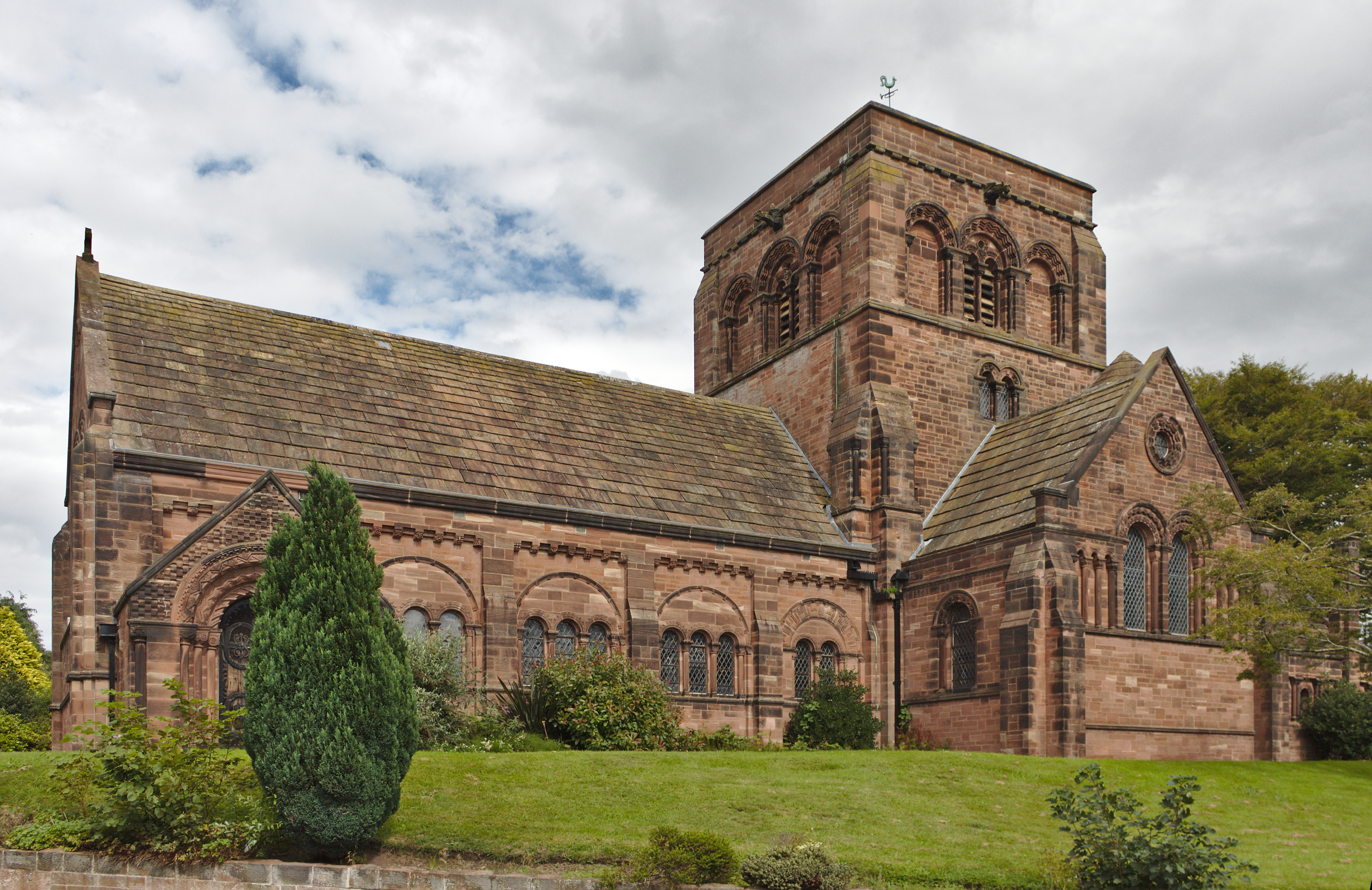
- St George's Church, Thornton Hough

- Location in Merseyside
- 53.3211°N 3.0454°W
- OS grid reference: SJ 305 810
- Location: Manor Road, Thornton Hough, Wirral, Merseyside
- Country: England
- Denomination: United Reformed Church
- Website: St George, Thornton Hough

History
- Founder: Lord Leverhulme

Architecture
- Functional status: Active
- Heritage designation: Grade II*
- Designated: 2 December 1986
- Architect: J. Lomax-Simpson
- Architectural type: Church
- Style: Neo-Norman
- Groundbreaking: 1906
- Completed: 1907

Specifications
- Materials: Sandstone, stone-slate roofs

St George's Church is in Manor Road, Thornton Hough, Wirral, Merseyside, England. Formerly home to a congregation of the United Reformed Church, the church closed in July 2021 and the building is now privately owned. It is recorded in the National Heritage List for England as a designated Grade II* listed building.

== History ==
The church was designed by J. Lomax-Simpson and built in 1906–07 for Lord Leverhulme. It is in Neo-Norman style, reflecting Lord Leverhulme's Nonconformity.

== Architecture ==
=== Exterior ===
St George's is constructed in sandstone with stone-slate roofs. The church has a cruciform plan consisting of a five-bay nave, north and south transepts, a chancel with an apse and a north porch, a south vestry, and a tower over the crossing. All the windows are round-headed; the windows along the sides of the church and at the west end have three lights, and those at the east end have two. The windows in the transepts are paired, with a round window above. At the west end are two gabled porches with round-headed entrances. The tower has angle buttresses, and in the bell stage are two-light bell openings and blind arcading. On top of the tower is a corbelled parapet and a recessed pyramidal roof. To the southeast of the tower is an octagonal stair turret with blind arcading and a pyramidal roof.

=== Interior ===
The interior of the church is richly and elaborately decorated, the sculptor being Edward O. Griffith. His work includes the capitals, which are decorated with biblical scenes. The altar contains a frieze, roundels, and arcading with marble columns. The wooden altar rail was carved by Hatch of Lancaster, and contains columns, all of which are different. Both the pulpit and the font are in Caen stone, and are Norman in style. The pews are decorated with cable moulding. The stained glass in the apse windows dates from 1926 and is by Burlison and Grylls. In the windows on the south of the church is glass by Hardman & Co. dated 1907, and by Heaton, Butler and Bayne from about 1919. The two-manual pipe organ was made in 1907 by Norman and Beard.

== External features ==
At the southwest corner of the churchyard is a hexagonal covered entranceway. This was also designed by Lomax-Simpson, built in 1906–07, and constructed in sandstone with a stone-slate roof. It has Neo-Norman detailing. There is a round-headed arch on each side, with buttresses, two gargoyles, and a parapet on a corbel table. It has a pyramidal roof. Inside is a ribbed dome with a central boss carved with a dragon. The structure is designated as a Grade II listed building.

== See also ==
- Grade II* listed buildings in Merseyside
- Listed buildings in Thornton Hough
