= Raby, Merseyside =

Coordinates: 53.312°N 3.038°W

Raby
- Hamlet
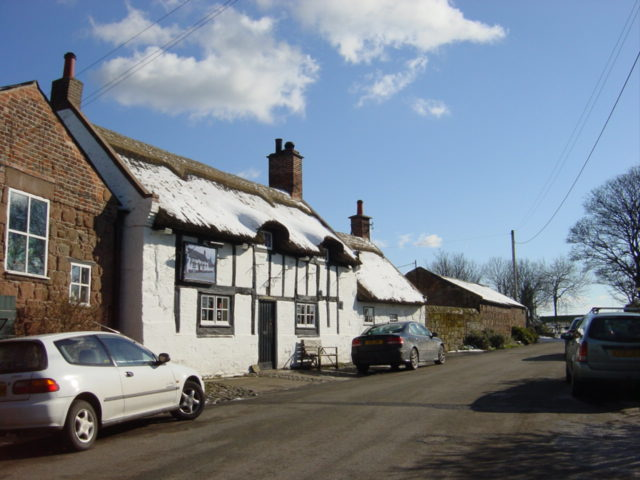
- The Wheatsheaf Inn, The Green, Raby

- Location within Merseyside
- Population: 100 (2001 Census)
- OS grid reference: SJ309799
  - London: 175 mi (282 km) SE
- Metropolitan borough: Wirral
- Metropolitan county: Merseyside
- Region: North West
- Country: England
- Sovereign state: United Kingdom
- Post town: Wirral
- Postcode district: CH63
- Dialling code: 0151
- ISO 3166 code: GB-WRL
- Police: Merseyside
- Fire: Merseyside
- Ambulance: North West
- UK Parliament: Wirral West

Raby (locally /ˈreɪbi/) is a hamlet in the Wirral district of Merseyside, England. It is on the Wirral Peninsula, in the Clatterbridge Ward. The settlement is within the parliamentary constituency of Wirral South. Raby is a former civil parish, but since 1974 has been directly administered by Wirral Council

Raby is close to Merseyside's boundary with Cheshire and is around 4 km (2.5 mi) North East of Neston and 5 km (3.1 mi) South West of Bebington. The hamlet of Raby Mere is 3.6 km (2.2 mi) to the east.

At the time of the United Kingdom Census 2001, Raby had a total population of 100.

== Geography ==
Raby is in the central part of the Wirral Peninsula, approximately 12.5 km (7.8 mi) south-south-east of the Irish Sea at Leasowe Lighthouse, 3.5 km (2.2 mi) east-north-east of the Dee Estuary at Parkgate and about 5.5 km (3.4 mi) west of the River Mersey at Eastham. The hamlet is situated at around 50 m (160 ft) above sea level.

== History ==
The name Raby is of Viking origin, derived from the Old Norse Ra-byr, meaning 'boundary settlement'. It is believed to be so named because it lay close to the 10th- and 11th-century border between the Norse colony in Wirral to the north, centred on Thingwall, and Anglo-Saxon Mercia to the south. It was part of the Wirral Hundred.

Raby was formerly a township in the parish of Neston and the county palatine of Chester. From 1866 Raby was a civil parish in its own right. In 1933 the parish was incorporated into the urban district of Bebington and was thereafter administered as part of that town (which became a municipal borough in 1937). The civil parish continued to exist until 1974, but as an urban parish with no parish council. The parish had a population of 131 in 1801, 195 in 1851, 350 in 1901 and 308 in 1951.

The borough of Bebington was abolished in 1974 under the Local Government Act 1972 and was incorporated into the new metropolitan borough of Wirral and Merseyside. No successor parish was created for the former borough and Raby is therefore directly administered by Wirral Council.

== Community ==
Raby is a rural community, comprising a few houses, two farms and an old, thatched public house, the 'Wheatsheaf', which is well known in the locality.

Raby, along with the neighbouring villages of Brimstage and Thornton Hough, are within an Area of Special Landscape Value, a protective designation to preserve the character and appearance of the area. This is part of the Wirral Unitary Development Plan of the Metropolitan Borough of Wirral.

The parish church is All Saints Church, Thornton Hough. The local primary school is Thornton Hough Primary.

== Transport ==
=== Road ===
Raby is accessible from the A540 to the south-west, the B5151 to the east and the B5136 to the north.

=== Bus ===
Services operating in the Raby Area as of 2015:

| Number | Route | Operator | Days of operation |
|---|---|---|---|
| 85 | Clatterbridge Hospital - Heswall | Avon Buses | Monday - Saturday |

=== Rail ===
The nearest station to Raby is Bromborough railway station, about 3.5 km (2.2 mi) to the east. This station is on the Wirral Line of the Merseyrail network, with frequent services to Liverpool, Chester and Ellesmere Port.

== See also ==
- Listed buildings in Raby, Merseyside

== Bibliography ==
- Mortimer, William Williams (1847). The History of the Hundred of Wirral. London: Whittaker & Co. pp244-245.
