= Gorsedd, Flintshire =

Village in Flintshire, Wales

Coordinates: 53.280°N 3.273°W

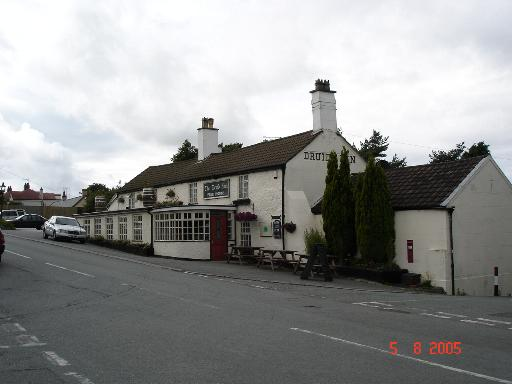
The Druid Inn, Gorsedd

Gorsedd is a village in Flintshire, Wales, in the community of Whitford, with a population of 391 in the 2011 census.
