= Holway, Flintshire =

Housing estate in Flintshire, Wales

Coordinates: 53.282200°N 3.235°W

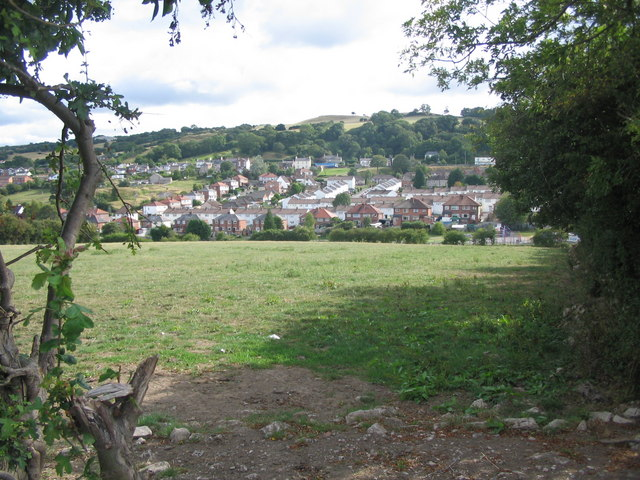
Holway in 2006

Holway is a housing estate in Flintshire, Wales. It is to the east of Carmel and to the north of the North Wales expressway.

== History ==
Holway has had problems with anti-social behaviour.
