= Carmel, Flintshire =

Village in Flintshire, Wales

Coordinates: 53.278°N 3.238°W

Carmel
- Location within Flintshire
- OS grid reference: SJ174764
- Principal area: Flintshire
- Preserved county: Clwyd
- Country: Wales
- Sovereign state: United Kingdom
- Post town: HOLYWELL
- Postcode district: CH8
- Dialling code: 01352
- Police: North Wales
- Fire: North Wales
- Ambulance: Welsh
- UK Parliament: Clwyd East
- Senedd Cymru – Welsh Parliament: Delyn

Carmel is a small village in Flintshire, Wales, just outside Holywell. Carmel has a primary school and a village hall. The village had two functioning chapels – Carmel Calvinistic Methodist Chapel, from which the village gets its name, and Seion Congregationalist Chapel. Both are now closed. Carmel & District Cricket Club played their matches in the village until the 1990s when they moved to a new ground a short distance away. Carmel is in Whitford Community and west of Holway.

== Famous people ==
Actor Sir Jonathan Pryce hails from Carmel. He once opened a school hall in the village.

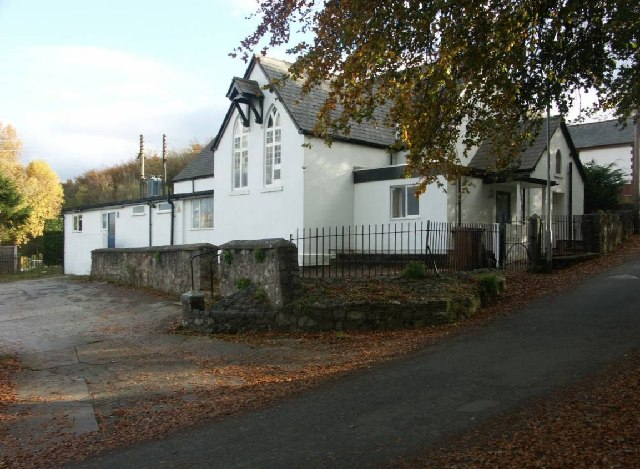
Old British School
