= Mold Railway =

Former British railway company

Coordinates: 53°8′21″N 3°1′28″W

The Mold Railway was a railway company that built a line in north-east Wales. The line linked Mold to Chester and it opened on 14 August 1849. The company built a mineral branch line to Ffrith, opened in November 1849. Mold itself was an important regional centre, and contained considerable mineral resources.

The London and North Western Railway took over the company in 1859. As the mineral industry developed, steelmaking at Brymbo became dominant, and the LNWR arranged with the Great Western Railway to connect to that place.

The passenger service closed in 1962, and in 1972 all rail activity ceased except for serving the Synthite factory just north of Mold; total closure followed in 1983.

== Route ==
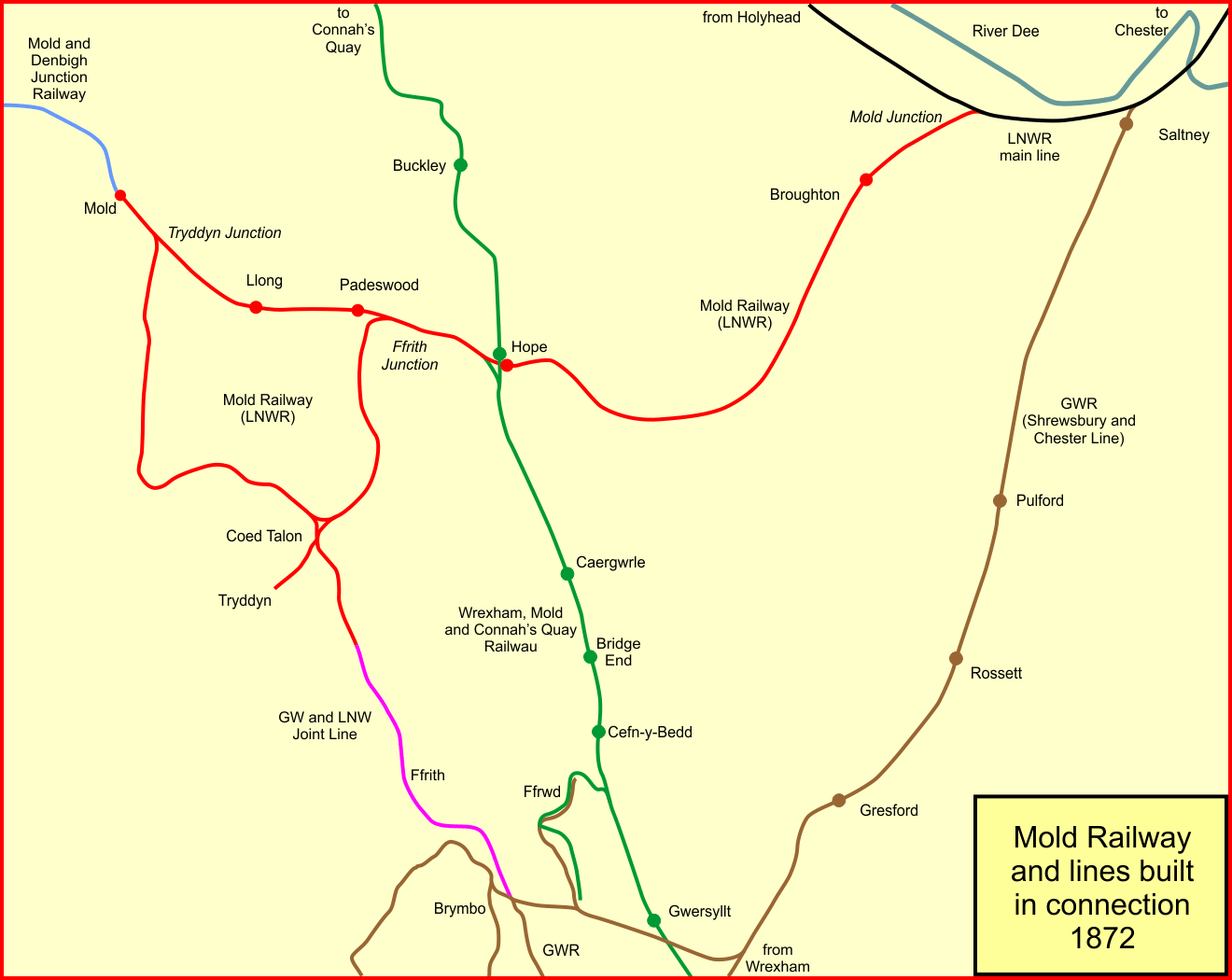
The Mold railway

The Chester and Holyhead Railway opened its route in 1848 from Chester to Bangor, and to Holyhead in 1850. Its promoters saw the Irish Mail traffic as the dominant purpose of their line. However, Mold was an important regional centre with considerable mineral resources locally, and the Mold Railway was authorised by the Mold Railway Act 1847 (10 & 11 Vict. c. clxii) on 9 July 1847. The company's capital was to be £180,000, and it would run from the junction at Saltney (west of Chester), to Mold, with a branch to Ffrith where there were large mineral deposits.

The construction of the C&HR main line, and in particular the Britannia Bridge, consumed all of the C&HR's available financial resources and more, and as many directors and shareholders were common between the C&HR and the Mold Railway, the latter was not well provided with funds. This led to a slowing down of construction progress in 1848, and deferment of the Ffrith branch beyond Coed Talon. The C&HR became impatient as it had been relying on this feeder to its system, and it acquired the Mold Railway Company, by the action of a clause in the Mold Railway Act 1847; this was effective on 30 March 1849.

== History ==
=== Early days ===
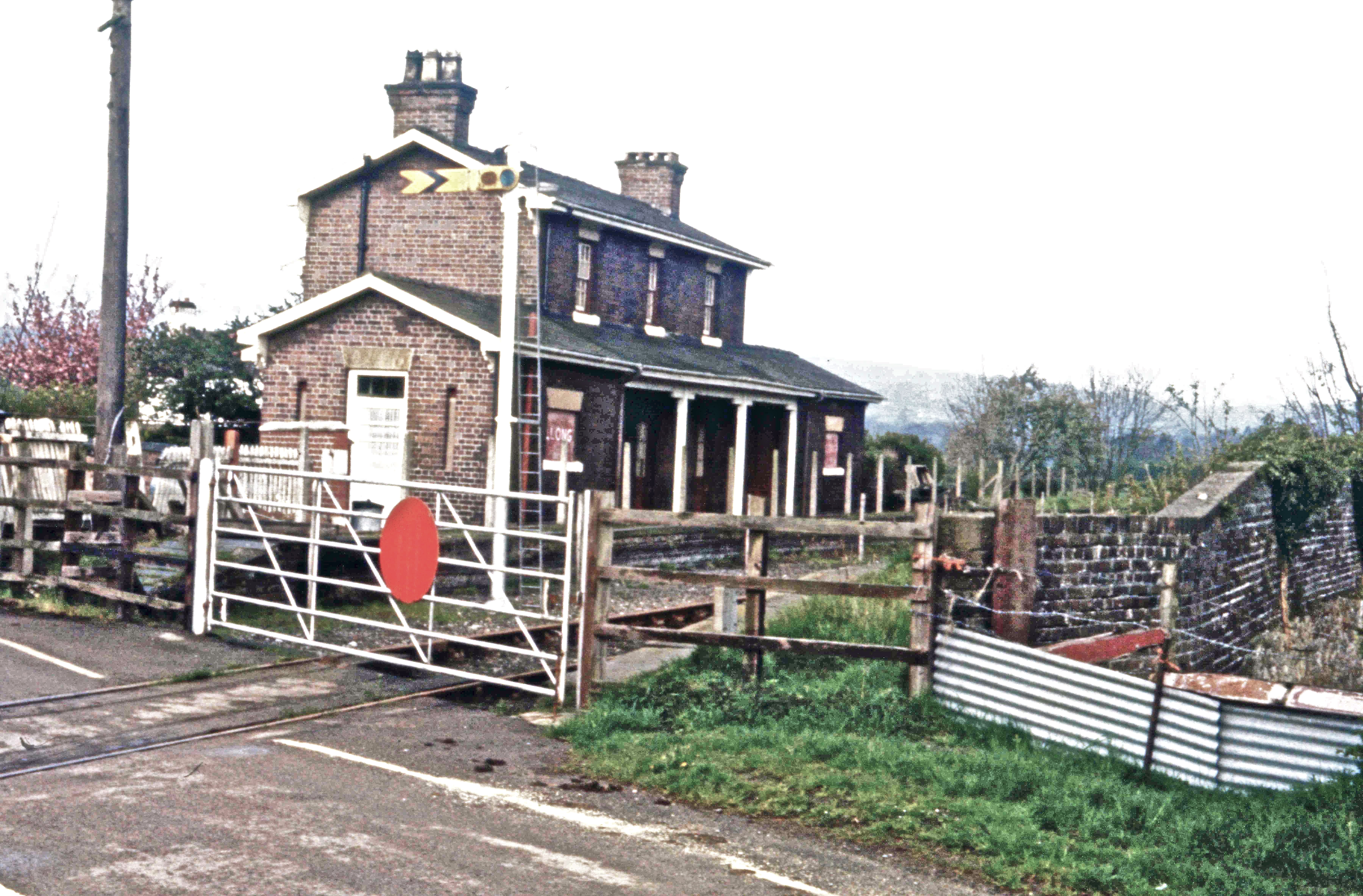
Llong station in June 1980

The contractor for the construction of the line agreed to take most of his payment in shares, in effect funding the line himself, and it was opened on 14 August 1849; in common with the main part of the C&HR it was worked by the London and North Western Railway. The line left the Chester to Holyhead line at Saltney Junction, a little west of Chester, and there were intermediate stations at Broughton, Hope and Llong. The line was 10 miles (16 km) long, of which the first 7 miles (11 km) was double track.

A branch was constructed southwards from a trailing Ffrith Junction, near Padeswood, to Coed Talon, from where a private line extended to Nerquis, where there was a coal pit. The steeply graded branch line opened on 14 September 1849; part of the parliamentary authorisation was to continue to limestone quarries at Ffrith, but for the time being that was left in abeyance. The mine and quarry owner Edward Oakley worked the branch with his own engine, Diamond. A station was opened at Padeswood (on the Mold main line) in 1851. In 1852 the C&HR took over the branch line and the LNWR worked it.

Passenger services appear to have started as soon as the line opened, as the Chester railway timetable (published weekly in the Chester Chronicle) shows two trains each way between Chester and Mold as early as 17 August 1849. In mid-October 1849 this was increased to three trains each way. Bradshaw's Guide for 1850 shows the passenger train service: there were three trains each way to and from Chester on weekdays, and two on Sundays. The first class single fare was 2s 6d and the cheapest fare 1s 1d. In the spring of 1859 the timetable was increased to four trains a day each way (two on Sundays). In the investigation into an accident that took place on the 9:25 Chester to Mold service in March 1868 it was reported that the John o' Gaunt locomotive (which suffered a boiler tube failure) was hauling 12 passenger coaches.

=== 1859-1923: Takeover by the LNWR ===
The Chester and Holyhead Railway had become increasingly beholden to the London and North Western Railway, which had been working it. The Mold Railway was a dependency of the C&HR, and the two companies were acquired by the LNWR. The London and North Western Railway (Additional Works) Act 1858 (21 & 22 Vict. c. cxxxi) authorised the absorption, and it took effect on 1 January 1859. (Note: The takeover was of the active railway; the Mold Railway Company remained in existence until full amalgamation in 1879.) Further coal pits were opened at Coed Talon in 1861, and there was an oil production plant, the Coppa Oil Company, which opened in 1865. The oil was extracted from local coal.

When the Mold and Denbigh Junction Railway opened in 1869, through traffic on the line was heavy, and the remaining single track at the Mold end of the main line was doubled to cope. The Ffrith line suffered from severe gradients, the ruling gradient being 1 in 40; no passenger train ever worked over the section from Ffrith Junction to Coed Talon. The LNWR decided to make a new connection to the pits around Coed Talon; by an act of Parliament of 16 July 1866 the LNWR was empowered to build from a new junction near Mold (Tryddyn Junction) to join the former line near Tryddyn, including adoption of part of the Nerquis line, though curves wee eased. The line opened as far as Oak Pits Colliery on 16 March 1869, and on to Coed Talon on 8 July 1870; there was a triangular junction there.

In 1887 the Tryddyn line was closed, although it reopened in 1923. Four trains a day every weekday ran over the line from Mold to Coed Talon from 1 January 1892. They were extended to Brymbo over the joint line on 2 May 1898, four trains running each way daily.

By 1895, Mold was the centre of a local network. The Mold to Chester service was nine trains weekdays, one additional Saturday train. Many of the trains came through from Denbigh or made a good connection from there. There was a limited stop morning train to Chester and back in the evening. There is no reference to a Sunday service. There were three daily trains, with one additional on Saturday, from Mold to Coed Talon.

Rear notes that in 1904 "Two goods trains each way were shown working over the Padeswood, Coppa and Coed Talon branches for the same period [July 1904], although the timings of the up trains varied between weekdays and Saturdays. On the Mold, Coed Talon and Brymbo branch there were four passenger trains each way daily, and an extra train each way on Wednesday and Saturday evenings". By 1919 the mineral trains had reduced to one daily.

==== Wrexham, Mold and Connah's Quay Railway ====
In 1866 the main line of the WM&CQR opened; it ran from Wrexham to a wharf on the River Dee at Connah's Quay. Its primary traffic was to be minerals, but passenger accommodation was provided. The WM&CQR crossed the Mold Railway near Hope. An Exchange Platform was provided on each line, although the accommodation was primitive. At first there was no access to and from the stations, other than from a train on the other line.

A connecting curve was provided at the intersection by the WM&CQR, enabling its trains to run towards Mold; however the LNWR did not encourage this incursion, and passenger traffic never used the line. Passengers were conveyed to and from Mold by horse omnibus.

==== Wrexham and Minera Joint Railway ====
The North Wales Coalfield saw a south-eastward extension from the area, and the Great Western Railway dominated a network of branch lines in the Brymbo area served that part of the coalfield. The GWR had a route between Wrexham and Minera (where there were mineral resources), but the route had two rope-worked inclines on it. The Wrexham and Minera Railway was a satellite of the GWR, created to provide a route with easier gradients, and it opened in 1862. In 1865 the W&MR got authorisation in the Wrexham and Minera Railway Act 1865 (28 & 29 Vict. c. cclx) to build a line to Tryddyn, near Coed Talon; the objective was for the GWR to get access to the minerals around Mold. This line was called the Wrexham and Minera Extension Railway, but it was never built under that name. The following year the LNWR and the GWR agreed to build the connecting line jointly, giving the LNWR access to Brymbo, an important steel-making town on the original W&MR. The line was retitled the Wrexham and Minera Joint Railway, although it did not approach close to either Wrexham or Minera. This change was authorised by the Wrexham and Minera Railway Act 1866 (29 & 30 Vict. c. lxxxvii) of 11 June 1866.

There was some delay in building the line, and it actually opened on 27 January 1872. By this time the W&MR had been vested in the GWR. In a further change of plan, the joint section only reached from Brymbo to a boundary about halfway to Coed Talon; north-west of that point the new line was totally LNWR. The boundary was at Pantystain, immediately north-west of the level crossing on the present-day A5101 road. According to Boyd there was a boundary stone at the location.

=== 1923-1983: Grouping of the railways and closure ===
In 1923 the main line railways of Great Britain were grouped, under the Railways Act 1921, into one or other of four new, larger companies. The LNWR was a constituent of the new London Midland and Scottish Railway. This then became the London Midland Region of British Railways.

The original Ffrith branch (from Ffrith Junction to Coed Talon) closed on 29 July 1934, prompted by a derailment at Pontblyddyn. However, in 1939 there were still five daily goods trains between Mold Junction and Hope Junction for interchange with the London and North Eastern Railway (as successor to the WM&CQR) there.

The Mold to Brymbo passenger trains reduced to two per day after World War II, but the service was discontinued on 27 March 1950, and the line from Coed Talon to Ffrith closed completely on 1 May 1952. The passenger service between Chester and Mold ceased on 30 April 1962 and freight between Mold and Coed-Talon on 27/7/63.

Ordinary goods services were progressively withdrawn in the 1960s, and after 1972 the line only carried a single specialised traffic. From 1950 there was a formaldehyde production factory just north of Mold, operated by Synthite Limited. In order to maintain rail connection to the company's sidings, goods trains ran from Mold and over the WM&CQR connection at Pen-y-ffordd to Wrexham. That traffic came to an end so far as rail movements were concerned on 15 March 1983. (Note: The factory is still in operation as of 2019, but does not have a rail connection.)

=== 21st century ===
In January 2019, the Campaign for Better Transport released a report identifying the line as a priority 2 for reopening. Priority 2 is for those lines which require further development or a change in circumstances (such as housing developments).

== Stations ==
=== Main line ===
Ordered from east to west, the stations on the line are:

- Saltney Ferry – there were separate platforms alongside the North Wales Main Line only used by Mold trains; opened 1 January 1891 and closed 30 April 1962.
- Mold Junction, where the route diverged from the North Wales Main Line
- Broughton; opened 14 August 1849; renamed Broughton Hall 1861; renamed Broughton & Bretton 1908; closed 30 April 1962; workmen used until 2 September 1963 (Quick) or 4 July 1964 for workmen at the adjoining aircraft factory (Rear).
- Kinnerton; opened 2 March 1891; closed 30 April 1962.
- Hope; opened 14 August 1849; renamed Hope & Pen-y-Ffordd 1912; closed 30 April 1962.
- Hope Passenger Exchange; opened 18 September 1867; renamed Hope Exchange High Level 1868; renamed Hope 1953; closed 1 September 1958.
- Ffrith Junction – where the branch to Coed Talon diverged; also known as Padeswood Junction.
- Padeswood – opened October 1850; renamed Padeswood & Buckley 1894; closed 6 January 1958.
- Llong – opened 14 August 1849; then closed 1 January 1917; then reopened 5 May 1919; closed 30 April 1962.
- Tryddyn Junction – where the lines from Brymbo and Coed Talon converged.
- Mold – the terminus of the line; opened 14 August 1849 and closed 30 April 1962.

=== Brymbo line ===
- Tryddyn Junction – where the line diverges from the main line.
- Coed Talon – opened 1 January 1892; closed 27 March 1950.
- The boundary between the LNWR line and the Joint Line.
- Llanfynydd – opened 2 May 1898; closed 27 March 1950.
- Ffrith – opened 2 May 1898; closed 27 March 1950.
- Brymbo (GWR station) – opened 24 May 1882; closed 27 March 1950.
