= Llanfynydd railway station =

Former railway station in Flintshire, Wales

Llanfynydd

General information
- Location: Llanfynydd, Flintshire; Wales
- Coordinates: 53.1012°N 3.0777°W
- Grid reference: SJ279566
- Platforms: 1

Other information
- Status: Disused

History
- Original company: Wrexham and Minera Railway
- Pre-grouping: LNWR and GWR joint
- Post-grouping: LMS and GWR joint

Key dates
- 2 May 1898: Opened
- 27 March 1950: Closed to passengers
- 1 May 1952: Closed
Location

Llanfynydd railway station was a station in Llanfynydd, Flintshire, Wales. The station was opened on 2 May 1898, closed to passengers on 27 March 1950 and closed completely on 1 May 1952.

Preceding station	Disused railways	Following station
Coed Talon; Line and station closed	LNWR and GWR joint Wrexham and Minera Railway	Ffrith; Line and station closed
