= The Lodge Halt railway station =

Former railway station in Wrexham, Wales

The Lodge Halt

General information
- Location: Brymbo, Wrexham; Wales
- Coordinates: 53.0682°N 3.0436°W
- Grid reference: SJ302527
- Platforms: 2

Other information
- Status: Disused

History
- Original company: Great Western Railway
- Pre-grouping: Great Western Railway
- Post-grouping: Great Western Railway

Key dates
- 1 July 1906: Opened
- 1 January 1931: Closed
Location

The Lodge Halt railway station was a station in Brymbo, Wrexham, Wales. The station was opened on 1 July 1906 and closed on 1 January 1931.

Preceding station	Disused railways	Following station
Brymbo (WMR); Line and station closed	Great Western Railway; Wrexham and Minera Railway	Plas Power (WMR); Line and station closed
