= Ffrith railway station =

Former railway station in Wales

Ffrith
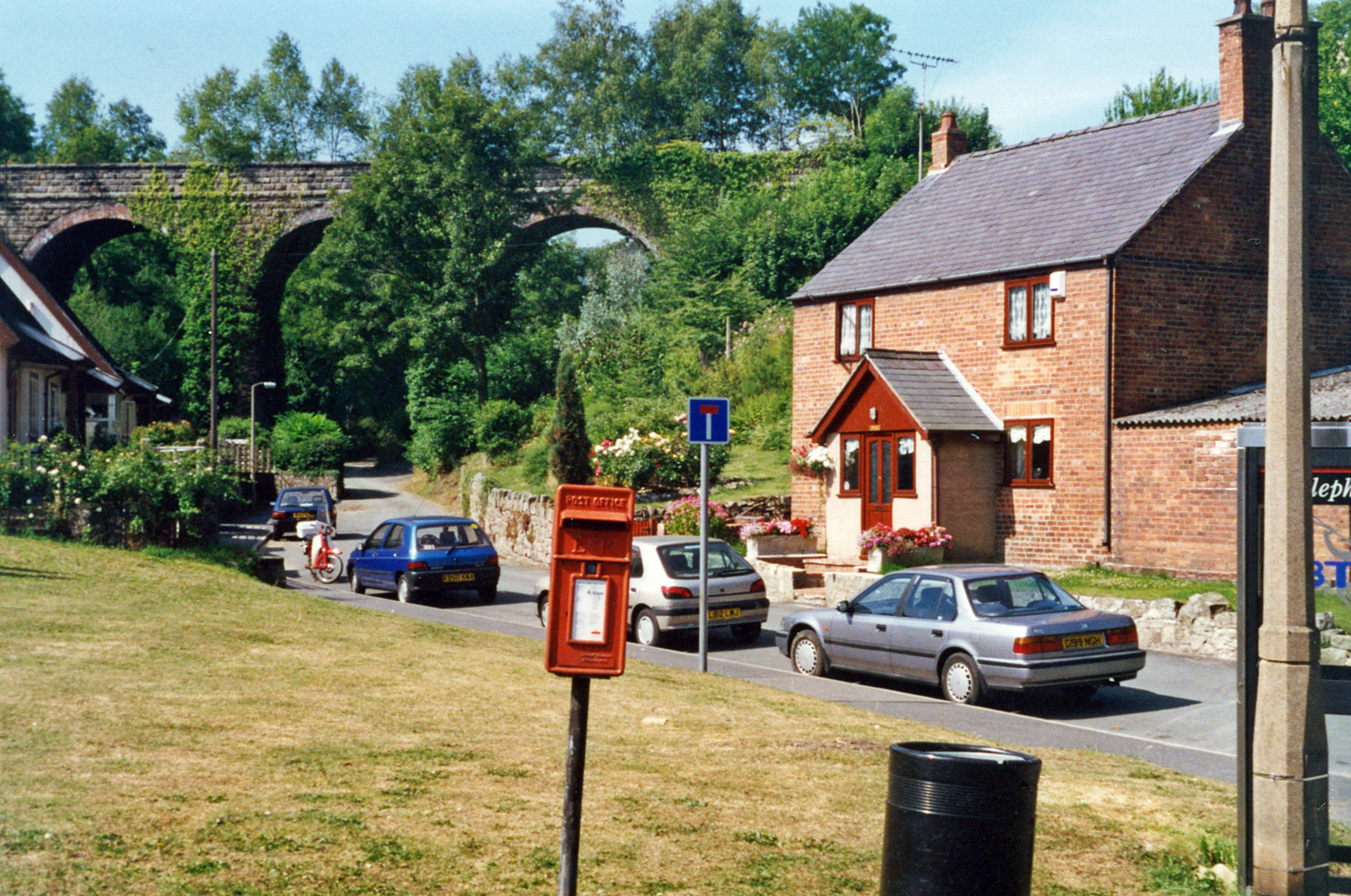
- Location of Ffrith station

General information
- Location: Ffrith, Flintshire; Wales
- Coordinates: 53.0911°N 3.0722°W
- Grid reference: SJ283554
- Platforms: 1

Other information
- Status: Disused

History
- Original company: Wrexham and Minera Railway
- Pre-grouping: LNWR and GWR joint
- Post-grouping: LMS and GWR joint

Key dates
- 2 May 1898: Opened
- 27 March 1950: Closed
Location

Ffrith railway station was a station in Ffrith, Flintshire, Wales. The station was opened on 2 May 1898 and closed on 27 March 1950.

Preceding station	Disused railways	Following station
Llanfynydd; Line and station closed	LNWR and GWR joint Wrexham and Minera Railway	Brymbo (WMR); Line and station closed
