= Brymbo railway station (Great Western Railway) =

Disused railway station in Wales

Brymbo (WMR)
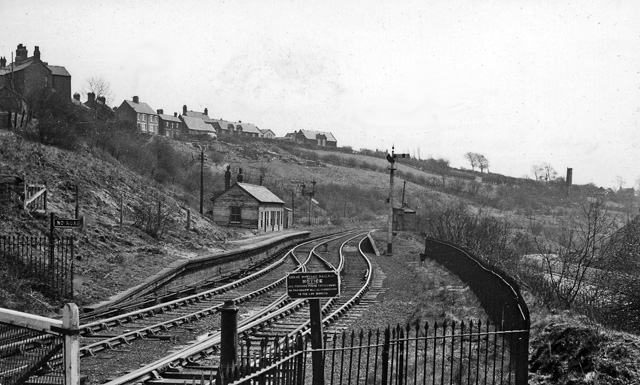
- The site of the station in 1962

General information
- Location: Brymbo, Wrexham; Wales
- Coordinates: 53.0746°N 3.0476°W
- Grid reference: SJ298535
- Platforms: 2

Other information
- Status: Disused

History
- Original company: Great Western Railway
- Pre-grouping: Great Western Railway
- Post-grouping: Great Western Railway

Key dates
- 24 May 1882: Opened
- 27 March 1950: Closed to passengers
- 2 November 1964: Closed
Location

Brymbo railway station was a station in Brymbo, Wrexham, Wales. The station was opened on 24 May 1882, closed to passengers on 27 March 1950 and closed completely on 2 November 1964.

Preceding station	Disused railways	Following station
Ffrith; Line and station closed	Great Western Railway; Wrexham and Minera Railway	The Lodge Halt; Line and station closed
Brymbo West Crossing Halt; Line and station closed	Great Western Railway; Wrexham and Minera Railway	The Lodge Halt; Line and station closed
