= Tanyfron =

Village in Wrexham County Borough, Wales

Coordinates: 53.062°N 3.051°W

Tanyfron: Welsh: Tan-y-fron
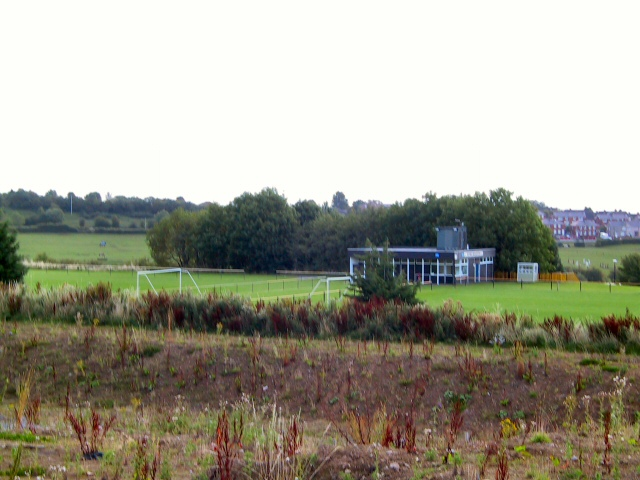
- Sports Grounds, Tanyfron

- Location within Wrexham
- OS grid reference: SJ296522
- Community: Brymbo
- Principal area: Wrexham
- Preserved county: Clwyd
- Country: Wales
- Sovereign state: United Kingdom
- Post town: WREXHAM
- Postcode district: LL11
- Dialling code: 01978
- Police: North Wales
- Fire: North Wales
- Ambulance: Welsh
- UK Parliament: Clwyd South
- Senedd Cymru – Welsh Parliament: Clwyd South

Tanyfron (Welsh: Tan-y-fron) is a village in Wrexham County Borough in Wales. At the time of the 2001 census, the population of area Wrexham 006A, which includes Tanyfron and a number of other small settlements, was 1,347. The village is part of the local government Community of Brymbo and is in the Vron electoral ward. The built-up area had a population of well over 2,000 as of the 2011 census.

== History ==
Tanyfron developed largely in order to provide accommodation for the families of miners. The shafts of the Vron Colliery, immediately to the west of today's village and taking its name from the adjacent Vron Farm, were first sunk in 1806 by Rogers of Coedpoeth; it was purchased in 1840 by the surveyor and engineer William Low. The initial small settlement of miners' houses, called Vron (an anglicised version of the Welsh word fron, "hillside", "slope"), was joined in the 1890s by a larger village to the east called Tan-y-fron ("under the hillside"). Most of the residents worked in the collieries at Vron or Plas Power, or in the nearby Brymbo Steelworks.

A church dedicated to St. Alban was opened in 1897 as a "chapel of ease" for the parish church at Southsea. There were also formerly two nonconformist chapels, Mynydd Seion (Wesleyan, built in 1896) and Cana (Congregationalist).

The colliery was served by two railways, a spur of the Great Western Railway's Wrexham and Minera Branch and a branch of the Wrexham, Mold and Connah's Quay Railway. The embankment of the latter is now a footpath still known locally as "the Line".

The Vron Colliery suffered financial problems throughout its history and was eventually closed in 1930; the colliery spoil tips, known locally as the "Bonc" (from the Welsh word for "hillock"), were finally cleared in the late 1980s. The major local employer, the Steelworks, expanded across the hillside to Tanyfron in 1976, but closed in 1990 with serious economic effects for the village.

Harold Tudor (1908-1988), the British Council official credited with starting the Llangollen International Musical Eisteddfod, was born in Tanyfron, where his parents lived on St Alban's Road.

== The village today ==
Tanyfron still has both a small primary school and St Alban's church. Some housing development has taken place in the village, and in the village of Vron, during the 1990s and after. This led to protests in 2006 when the former school playing field was sold off for residential development.

As of 2010, St Alban's church has been closed, and has been put up for sale by the Church in Wales.
