= Llanfynydd, Flintshire =

Village and community in Flintshire, Wales

Llanfynydd
- Village and community
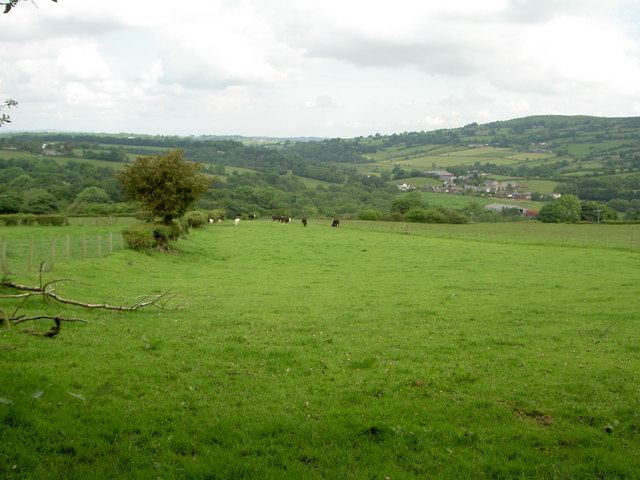
- View towards Llanfynydd

- Location within Flintshire
- Population: 1,850 (2011)
- OS grid reference: SJ279567
- Community: Llanfynydd
- Principal area: Flintshire
- Preserved county: Clwyd
- Country: Wales
- Sovereign state: United Kingdom
- Post town: MOLD
- Postcode district: CH7
- Post town: WREXHAM
- Postcode district: LL11
- Postcode district: LL12
- Dialling code: 01978
- Police: North Wales
- Fire: North Wales
- Ambulance: Welsh
- UK Parliament: Alyn and Deeside
- Senedd Cymru – Welsh Parliament: Alyn and Deeside
- Website: llanfynydd.org.uk
- List of places UK Wales Flintshire 53.102604°N 3.078343°W Map of the community

Llanfynydd is a village, local government community and electoral ward in Flintshire, Wales. Its name is derived from the Welsh words llan ("enclosure" or "parish"), and mynydd ("mountain").

== Description ==
The community, which includes the villages of Llanfynydd, Cymau, Cefn-y-Bedd and Ffrith along with a number of smaller hamlets, had a population of 1,752 at the 2001 census, increasing to 1,850 at the 2011 census.

The village is situated in the valley of the River Cegidog beneath Hope Mountain.

== History ==
The area has been inhabited since early times. A cairn near Cymau, known in the past as Arffedogaid y Wrach but now destroyed, probably represented a prehistoric burial site. Offa's Dyke runs through the valley, and evidence of earlier Roman settlement has been found at the nearby Ffrith site, suggesting a substantial civilian community with a connection to the XX Legion. The Roman presence was first noted by the antiquarian William Camden in the 16th century.

Llanfynydd's administrative history is actually fairly modern, as the parish was first created on 7 February 1845 out of the old townships of Uwchmynydd Ucha and Uwchmynydd Isa and part of the township of Cymau. These townships had previously been in the parish of Hope. The church, now dedicated to St. Michael, was designed by John Lloyd and originally consecrated in 1843: it was badly damaged by fire in 1892. Many of the parish registers were destroyed in the fire.

The modern village of Llanfynydd developed in the 19th century, when there was quarrying and mining in the area. In common with most Welsh villages of the era, a Nonconformist chapel (Penuel, Welsh Congregationalist) was built. A railway, the Wrexham and Minera Joint Railway, was opened from Brymbo through Llanfynydd to Coed Talon near Mold in the 1870s. With the introduction of passenger services, a station was provided at Llanfynydd in 1898. The station was eventually closed in 1950, and the line closed completely in 1952.

Llanfynydd village has a small primary school and a pub, the Cross Keys.

== Governance ==
The community of Llanfynydd, governed by Llanfynydd Community Council and divided into Cefn-y-Bedd, Cymau, Ffrith and Pontybodkin wards, was created out of the old civil parish in 1974. Between 1974 and 1996 Llanfynydd, previously in the historic county of Flintshire, was part of the new county of Clwyd; it is now in the modern unitary authority of Flintshire.

Llanfynydd is also an electoral ward, coterminous with the community. It elects one county councillor to Flintshire County Council. At the May 2017 elections the Labour Party gained the seat from the Conservatives.

== Big cat sightings ==
The area has a history of big cat sightings going back as far as 2006, when Tiger King star Carole Baskin wrote on Big Cat Rescue’s website: “Earlier this year there were confirmed reports and prints of a puma near Treuddyn and Leeswood near Mold".

In 2013, a resident of Treuddyn saw an all-black big cat moving through a paddock in the early hours of the morning.

In November 2020, a Caergwrle resident captured a black puma on camera crossing the old railway line between Llanfynydd and Pontybodkin.
