= Coed Talon railway station =

Former railway station in Wales

Coed Talon
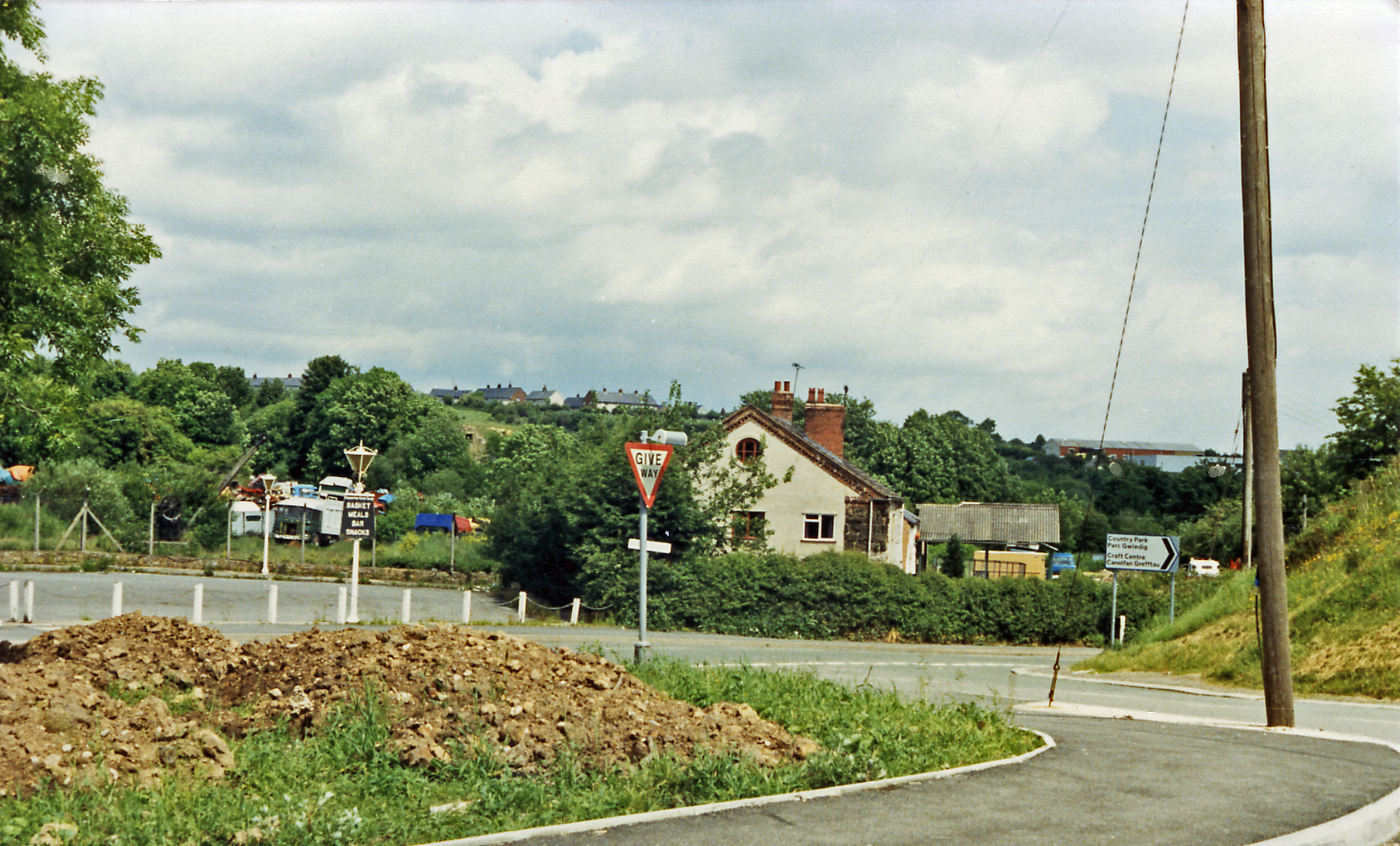
- The site of the station in 1986

General information
- Location: Coed Talon, Flintshire; Wales
- Coordinates: 53.1229°N 3.0942°W
- Grid reference: SJ268590
- Platforms: 1

Other information
- Status: Disused

History
- Original company: Wrexham and Minera Railway
- Pre-grouping: LNWR and GWR joint
- Post-grouping: LMS and GWR joint

Key dates
- 1 January 1892: Opened
- 27 March 1950: Closed to passengers
- 22 July 1963: Closed
Location

Coed Talon railway station was a station in Coed Talon, Flintshire, Wales. The station was opened on 1 January 1892, closed to passengers on 27 March 1950 and closed completely on 22 July 1963.

Preceding station	Disused railways	Following station
Mold; Line and station closed	LNWR and GWR joint Wrexham and Minera Railway	Llanfynydd; Line and station closed
Penyffordd; Line and station open	LNWR and GWR joint Wrexham and Minera Railway (Line closed 1935)	Llanfynydd; Line and station closed
Hope Exchange Low Level; Line and station closed	LNWR and GWR joint Wrexham and Minera Railway (Line closed 1935)	Llanfynydd; Line and station closed
