= LL postcode area =

Postcode area within the United Kingdom

Llandudno
- Postcode area
- Location within the United Kingdom
- Coordinates: 53.129°N 3.728°W
- Sovereign state: United Kingdom
- Postcode area: LL
- Postcode area name: Llandudno
- Post towns: 62
- Postcode districts: 67
- Postcode sectors: 150
- Postcodes (live): 20,121
- Postcodes (total): 24,296
- Statistics as at May 2020

The LL postcode area, also known as the Llandudno postcode area, is a group of 67 postcode districts, within 62 post towns. These cover the majority of north and north-west Wales, plus a very small part of the English county of Shropshire. The districts start at LL11 so as to avoid confusion with Liverpool postcodes (LL1–9 would resemble L11–19).

Mail for the LL postcode area is processed at Chester Mail Centre, along with mail for the CH and SY postcode areas.

== Post towns ==
The post towns are:

- Aberdovey
- Abergele
- Amlwch
- Arthog
- Bala
- Bangor
- Barmouth
- Beaumaris
- Benllech
- Betws-y-Coed
- Blaenau Ffestiniog
- Bodorgan
- Brynteg
- Caernarfon
- Cemaes Bay
- Colwyn Bay
- Conwy
- Corwen
- Criccieth
- Denbigh
- Dolgellau
- Dolwyddelan
- Dulas
- Dyffryn Ardudwy
- Fairbourne
- Gaerwen
- Garndolbenmaen
- Harlech
- Holyhead
- Llanbedr
- Llanbedrgoch
- Llandudno
- Llandudno Junction
- Llanerchymedd
- Llanfairfechan
- Llanfairpwllgwyngyll
- Llangefni
- Llangollen
- Llanrwst
- Llwyngwril
- Marianglas
- Menai Bridge
- Moelfre
- Penmaenmawr
- Penrhyndeudraeth
- Pentraeth
- Penysarn
- Porthmadog
- Prestatyn
- Pwllheli
- Rhosgoch
- Rhosneigr
- Rhyl
- Ruthin
- St Asaph
- Talsarnau
- Talybont
- Towyn
- Trefriw
- Ty Croes
- Tyn-y-Gongl
- Tywyn
- Wrexham
- Y Felinheli

== Coverage ==
The approximate coverage of the postcode districts:

Postcode district	Post town	Coverage	Local authority area(s)
LL11	WREXHAM	Wrexham, Coedpoeth, Llandegla, Minera, Bradley, Gwersyllt, Rhosrobin, Stansty, Brymbo, Bwlchgwyn, Cymau, Ffrith, Llanfynydd, Gwynfryn, Tanyfron, Brynteg	Denbighshire, Flintshire, Wrexham
LL12	WREXHAM	Wrexham, Caergwrle, Cefn-y-bedd, Cymau, Gresford, Hope, Llay, Marford, Rossett	Flintshire, Wrexham
LL13	WREXHAM	Wrexham, Abenbury, Bowling Bank, Holt, Llan-y-Pwll, Pentre Maelor, Ridley Wood, Bangor-on-Dee, Gyfelia, Marchwiel, Overton, Penley, Worthenbury, Johnstown	Wrexham
LL14	WREXHAM	Wrexham, Rhosllanerchrugog, Cefn Mawr, Ponciau, Rhostyllen, Chirk, Ruabon	Shropshire, Wrexham
LL15	RUTHIN	Ruthin, Bontuchel, Clawddnewydd, Clocaenog, Cyffylliog, Gellifor, Graigfechan, Llanbedr Dyffryn Clwyd, Llanelidan, Llanfair Dyffryn Clwyd, Pwllglas, Rhewl	Denbighshire
LL16	DENBIGH	Denbigh, Bodfari, Llandyrnog, Llanrhaeadr, Bylchau, Groes, Henllan, Llannefydd, Llansannan, Nantglyn, The Green, Trefnant	Conwy, Denbighshire
LL17	ST. ASAPH	St Asaph, Allt Goch, Rhuallt, Tremeirchion, Waen	Conwy, Denbighshire
LL18	RHYL	Rhyl, Bodelwyddan, Cwm Dyserth, Kinmel Bay, Dyserth, Gwaenysgor, Rhuddlan, Trelawnyd	Conwy, Denbighshire, Flintshire
LL19	PRESTATYN	Prestatyn, Gronant	Denbighshire, Flintshire
LL20	LLANGOLLEN	Froncysyllte, Garth, Glyn Ceiriog, Llanarmon Dyffryn Ceiriog, Llwynmawr, Pandy, Pontfadog, Rhewl, Tregeiriog, Trevor, Llangollen, Eglwyseg, Llantysilio	Denbighshire, Wrexham
LL21	CORWEN	Corwen, Cynwyd, Glan-yr-afon, Glasfryn, Llandrillo, Llangwm, Maerdy, Ty Nant, Betws Gwerfil Goch, Bryneglwys, Carrog, Cerrigydrudion, Clawdd Poncen, Derwen, Glyndyfrdwy, Gwyddelwern, Llanfihangel Glyn Myfyr, Llidiart-y-Parc, Melin-y-Wig	Conwy, Denbighshire, Gwynedd
LL22	ABERGELE	Abergele, Towyn, Betws Yn Rhos, Gwytherin, Llanddulas, Llanfairtalhaiarn, Llangernyw, Moelfre, Pandy Tudur, Rhyd-y-Foel, Glascoed, St. George	Denbighshire, Conwy
LL23	BALA	Bala, Llandderfel, Llanfor, Llanuwchllyn, Sarnau	Gwynedd
LL24	BETWS-Y-COED	Betws-y-Coed, Capel Curig, Cwm Penmachno, Penmachno, Pentre Du, Pentrefoelas, Ysbyty Ifan	Conwy
LL25	DOLWYDDELAN	Dolwyddelan	Conwy
LL26	LLANRWST	Llanrwst, Capel Garmon, Llanddoged, Melin-y-Coed, Maenan	Conwy
LL27	TREFRIW	Trefriw	Conwy
LL28	COLWYN BAY	Colwyn Bay, Rhos-on-Sea, Eglwysbach, Glan Conwy, Mochdre, Tal-y-Cafn	Conwy
LL29	COLWYN BAY	Colwyn Bay, Llanelian, Llysfaen, Old Colwyn	Conwy
LL30	LLANDUDNO	Llanrhos, Llandudno, Penrhyn Bay	Conwy
LL31	LLANDUDNO JUNCTION	Glanwydden, Llangystennin, Llandudno Junction	Conwy
LL31	CONWY	Deganwy	Conwy
LL32	CONWY	Conwy, Dolgarrog, Groesffordd, Henryd, Rowen, Tal-y-Bont, Tyn-y-Groes	Conwy
LL33	LLANFAIRFECHAN	Abergwyngregyn, Llanfairfechan	Conwy, Gwynedd
LL34	PENMAENMAWR	Penmaenmawr, Dwygyfylchi	Conwy
LL35	ABERDYFI / ABERDOVEY	Aberdyfi	Gwynedd
LL36	TYWYN	Tywyn, Abergynolwyn, Bryncrug, Llanegryn, Rhoslefain	Gwynedd
LL37	LLWYNGWRIL	Llwyngwril	Gwynedd
LL38	FAIRBOURNE	Fairbourne, Friog	Gwynedd
LL39	ARTHOG	Arthog	Gwynedd
LL40	DOLGELLAU	Dolgellau, Brithdir, Drws Y Nant, Ganllwyd, Llanelltyd, Llanfachreth, Rhydymain, Tabor	Gwynedd
LL41	BLAENAU FFESTINIOG	Blaenau Ffestiniog, Talwaenydd, Ffestiniog, Gellilydan, Maentwrog, Manod, Trawsfynydd	Gwynedd
LL42	BARMOUTH	Barmouth, Llanaber	Gwynedd
LL43	TALYBONT	Talybont	Gwynedd
LL44	DYFFRYN ARDUDWY	Dyffryn Ardudwy	Gwynedd
LL45	LLANBEDR	Llanbedr	Gwynedd
LL46	HARLECH	Harlech, Llanfair	Gwynedd
LL47	TALSARNAU	Talsarnau, Soar, Ynys	Gwynedd
LL48	PENRHYNDEUDRAETH	Penrhyndeudraeth, Llanfrothen, Minffordd	Gwynedd
LL49	PORTHMADOG	Porthmadog, Borth-y-Gest, Morfa Bychan, Penmorfa, Prenteg, Tremadog	Gwynedd
LL51	GARNDOLBENMAEN	Garndolbenmaen	Gwynedd
LL52	CRICCIETH	Criccieth, Llanystumdwy, Pentrefelin, Rhoslan	Gwynedd
LL53	PWLLHELI	Pwllheli, Efailnewydd, Llannor, Abererch, Chwilog, Llithfaen, Nefyn, Pistyll, Plas Gwyn, Y Ffor, Abersoch, Bwlchtocyn, Llanbedrog, Mynytho, Penrhos, Rhydyclafdy, Aberdaron, Boduan, Botwnnog, Edern, Morfa Nefyn, Sarn, Tudweiliog	Gwynedd
LL54	CAERNARFON	Caernarfon, Clynnogfawr, Llanaelhaearn, Llandwrog, Pontllyfni, Saron, Trefor, Llanllyfni, Aberdesach, Nantlle, Penygroes, Rhyd Ddu, Talysarn, Bontnewydd, Carmel, Dinas, Groeslon, Rhosgadfan, Rhostryfan	Gwynedd
LL55	CAERNARFON	Caernarfon, Bethel (Gwynedd), Bontnewydd, Caeathro, Brynrefail, Clwt-y-Bont, Deiniolen, Penisarwaun, Beddgelert, Ceunant, Cwm-y-glo, Llanberis, Llanrug, Nant Gwynant, Nant Peris, Waunfawr	Gwynedd
LL56	Y FELINHELI	Y Felinheli	Gwynedd
LL57	BANGOR	Bangor, Llanllechid, Rachub, Talybont, Bethesda, Glasinfryn, Llandygai, Mynydd Llandygai, Rhiwlas, Tregarth	Gwynedd
LL58	BEAUMARIS	Beaumaris, Llanddona, Llanfaes, Llangoed, Penmon	Isle of Anglesey
LL59	MENAI BRIDGE	Menai Bridge, Llandegfan, Llansadwrn	Isle of Anglesey
LL60	GAERWEN	Gaerwen, Llanddaniel, Llangaffo, Star	Isle of Anglesey
LL61	LLANFAIRPWLLGWYNGYLL	Llanfairpwllgwyngyll, Brynsiencyn, Dwyran, Newborough, Penmynydd	Isle of Anglesey
LL62	BODORGAN	Bodorgan, Bethel (Anglesey), Hermon, Llangristiolus, Malltraeth, Trefdraeth	Isle of Anglesey
LL63	TY CROES	Ty Croes, Aberffraw, Llanfaelog	Isle of Anglesey
LL64	RHOSNEIGR	Rhosneigr	Isle of Anglesey
LL65	HOLYHEAD	Holyhead, Trearddur Bay, Four Mile Bridge, Rhoscolyn, Bodedern, Bryngwran, Caergeiliog, Llanynghenedl, Trefor, Valley, Gwalchmai, Llanddeusant, Llanfachraeth, Llanfaethlu, Llanfairynghornwy, Llanrhyddlad, Rhydwyn	Isle of Anglesey
LL66	RHOSGOCH	Rhosgoch	Isle of Anglesey
LL67	CEMAES BAY	Cemaes Bay, Tregele	Isle of Anglesey
LL68	AMLWCH	Amlwch, Bull Bay, Carreglefn, Llanfechell, Rhosybol	Isle of Anglesey
LL69	PENYSARN	Penysarn	Isle of Anglesey
LL70	DULAS	Dulas	Isle of Anglesey
LL71	LLANERCHYMEDD	Llanerchymedd	Isle of Anglesey
LL72	MOELFRE	Moelfre	Isle of Anglesey
LL73	MARIANGLAS	Marianglas	Isle of Anglesey
LL74	TYN-Y-GONGL	Tyn-y-Gongl, Benllech	Isle of Anglesey
LL75	PENTRAETH	Pentraeth, Red Wharf Bay, Rhoscefnhir	Isle of Anglesey
LL76	LLANBEDRGOCH	Llanbedrgoch	Isle of Anglesey
LL77	LLANGEFNI	Bodffordd, Rhostrehwfa, Talwrn, Llangefni	Isle of Anglesey
LL78	BRYNTEG	Brynteg	Isle of Anglesey

== Map ==
LL postcode area map, showing postcode districts in red and post towns in grey text, with links to nearby CH and SY postcode areas.

Detailed map of postcode districts and post towns in eastern Anglesey

== See also ==
- Postcode Address File
- List of postcode areas in the United Kingdom
