= Cymau =

Village in Flintshire, Wales

Coordinates: 53.094°N 3.053°W

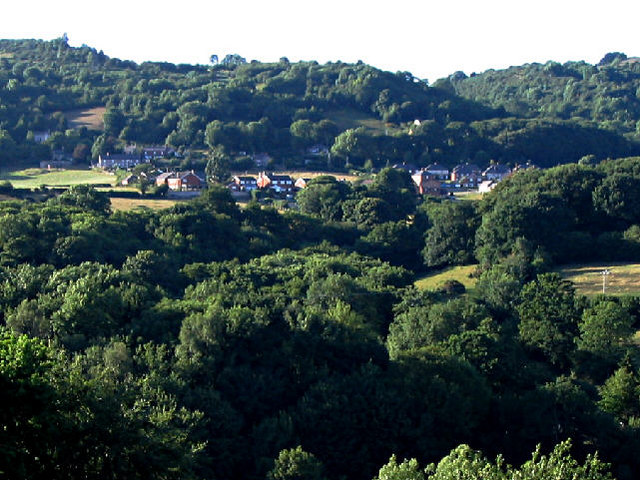
- Cymau, seen from the south

- Location within Flintshire
- OS grid reference: SJ294558
- Principal area: Flintshire
- Preserved county: Clwyd
- Country: Wales
- Sovereign state: United Kingdom
- Post town: WREXHAM
- Postcode district: LL11
- Dialling code: 01978
- Police: North Wales
- Fire: North Wales
- Ambulance: Welsh
- UK Parliament: Alyn and Deeside
- Senedd Cymru – Welsh Parliament: Alyn and Deeside

Cymau is a small village situated in the community of Llanfynydd, Flintshire on the edge of the mountains of northeast Wales.

The placename Cymau is a less common plural form of Welsh cwm, "valley"; this seems to have been rendered as cyme in the Welsh dialect of Flintshire, still reflected in the local colloquial pronunciation of the name as "Cymee".

The village is located on the side of Hope Mountain, a land feature that can be seen for miles around. Neighbouring villages include Ffrith to the west and Brymbo to the south. The nearest settlements are Wrexham to the south-east and Mold towards the north-west.

The area is known for its scenery and hill-walking routes. The summit of Hope Mountain offers views of the Cheshire Plain and, in the opposite direction, it is possible to see sunsets behind the Welsh hills.

The population of Cymau is around 350. The village had a pub (The Old Talbot Inn, now closed) and one parish church with a roof made from corrugated iron and also a chapel. The former village post office and general store closed in 2009.

During the winter months, despite the local bus being occasionally unable to traverse the terrain, the village remains reasonably accessible.
