= Croes Newydd =

Former railway site in Wrexham, Wales

Coordinates: 53°02′40″N 3°00′20″W

Croes Newydd was a large steam locomotive shed, marshalling yard and junction in Wrexham, in Wales.

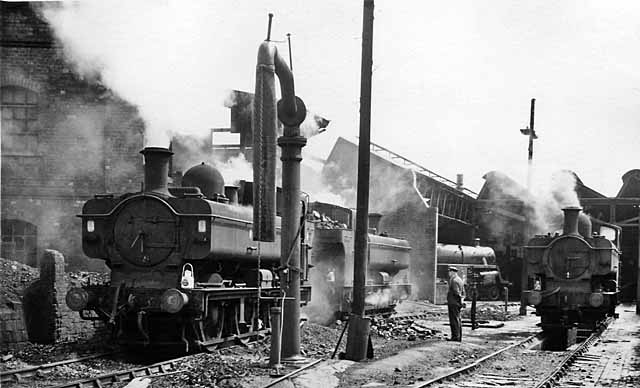
Croes Newydd Locomotive Yard in 1966

== History ==
The Wrexham and Minera Railway was opened on 22 May 1862, with little ceremony except a note from the Traffic Manager of the Great Western Railway stating that from that date all traffic on that line would be invoiced to or from Croesnewydd station instead of Wheatsheaf. This new station was a goods station "situated at the side of the highway leading from Croesnewydd to the Ruthin Road a short distance from the canal". Six sidings were provided here able to accommodate hundreds of wagons, and dealt with the weighing of goods from several collieries, including the Minera limeworks, Broughton Hall iron works, Brymbo furnaces, and other goods on the line.

Wrexham's Croes Newydd locomotive shed was the last of the GWR 'northlight' designs, being a roundhouse and depending on a central turntable for access. It was built by the Great Western Railway and opened in 1902, to replace outdated facilities at Wheatsheaf junction. It was located in the centre of a large fork junction, with the Chester to Shrewsbury line running along one edge, and the branch being the Wrexham and Minera Branch. The sheds also featured a GWR combined water tower and coaling stage, a design which was later to become standardised.

While the 'northlight' design was meant to allow maximum sunlight, the skylight windows quickly became sooty and black, reducing lighting conditions. The sheds stored several locomotives known as "workhorses" as they did the goods work. The last of these locomotives were the BR Standard 9F locomotives, the last of the British steam locomotives.

Under the cutbacks of BR in the 1960s, the shed finally closed in 1967.However, it was the last shed on the entire BR system to house working standard gauge GWR locomotives, with 56XX tank locomotives on the roster well into 1966.

=== After closure ===
Up until the late 1970s, sidings on the north curve of the former depot site were used for stabling diesel locos at weekends including Class 25s and Class 40s in association with Brymbo steelworks duties. However, with the closure of the Brymbo branch on 1/10/82 this practice ceased as a regular stabling point. Between closure and the 1980s, Wrexham Corporation (now Wrexham County Borough Council) opened a yard and depot on part of the site. This was home to the town and surrounding area's rock salt store, as well as the grit spreaders that dispersed it in cold weather. Also kept here were all thegrass cutting equipment and road maintenance equipment. After sustaining damage from a minor fire in one of the buildings, the depot was closed and relocated to the nearby Wrexham Industrial Estate in 2009.

In the 1990s, sidings to the southwest of the triangle were developed as a suburban housing estate; Named Llys-David-Lord (David Lord Court), named after David Lord, a famed aviator. Such was the pace of putting up fencing that the siding points continued under the newly erected fence line! Apart from the sidings, the only thing left was an old BR brake van. In the 2000s, the nearby Wrexham Maelor Hospital extended its car park onto the site of the marshalling yard to the west of the triangle.

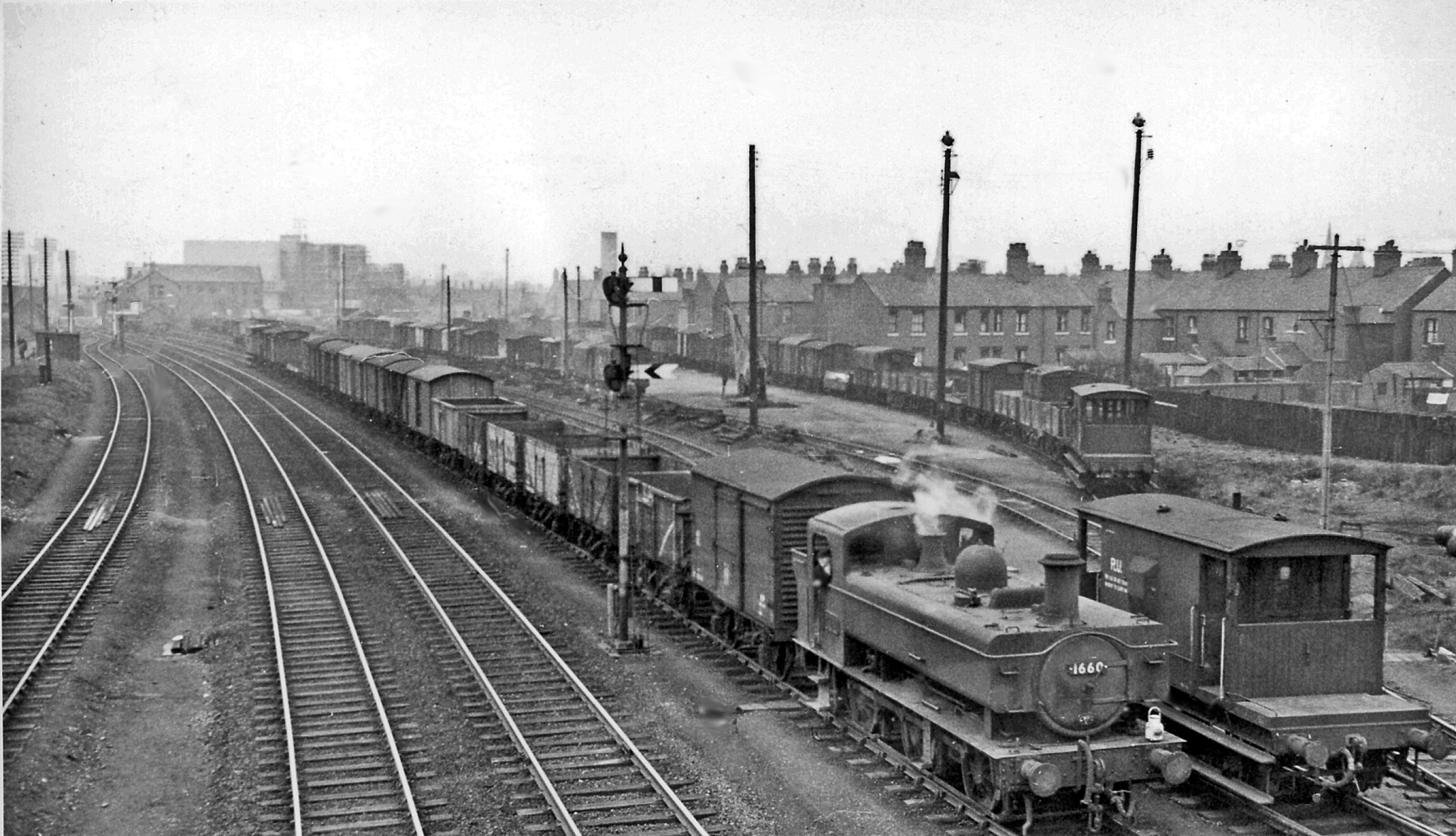
The sidings were used into the 1990s, when they were developed into Llys-David-Lord.

== Present status ==
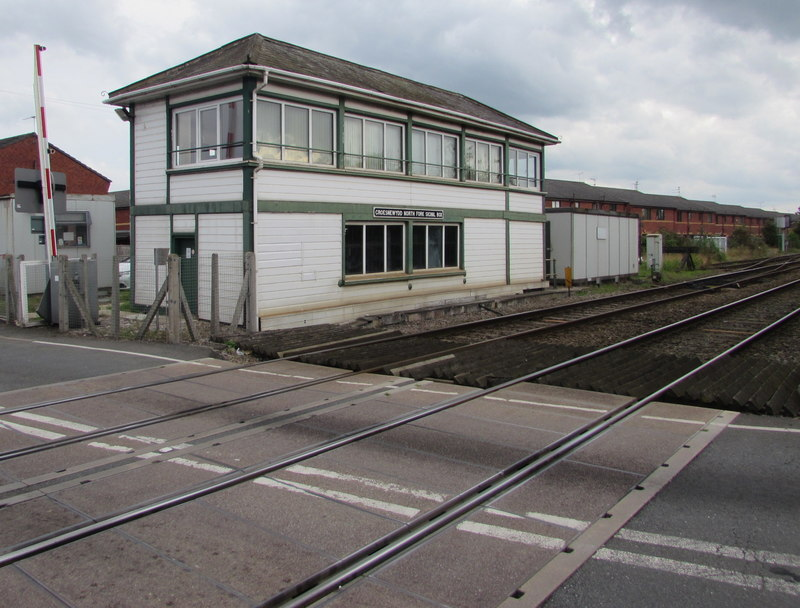
The Croesnewydd North Fork Signalbox

Now that the shed and marshalling yard were gone, the only remaining features were the Croes Newydd North and South Fork signal boxes. However the closure of the Wrexham and Minera Railway closed the South Fork signal box, leaving the North Fork box as the only remaining box in the Wrexham area.

In 2010, Morrisons, a national supermarket chain, announced its intention to develop a majority of the remaining vacant land into a supermarket and adjoining car park. This will be the first time in almost fifty years that the land has been occupied, and is being subjected to intense environmental rules, as over the years, the untamed scrub land and low lying debris from the original usage have formed natural habitats for a wide array of species. Some of the site will be retained as scrubland for possible future usage, and the route of the Northern fork of the Junction will be used as a path and cycleway to the level crossing near the North Fork Signal Box. This forms part of a route following the route of the Wrexham and Minera Railway as far as Moss Valley.

== Accidents and incidents ==
- 14 February 1925, Locomotive Chargeman James Waring, got his foot trapped in a wing rail of a crossing as wagons where sliding down the tracks. He was hit by a wagon and fell with his left arm across the rail, this arm was then ran over and amputated. 7 July 1928, Waring was now a shed chargeman. He was moving three wagons by gravity and was hit by a fourth which he had not seen. This accident resulted in his death.
