= River Cegidog =

River in north-east Wales

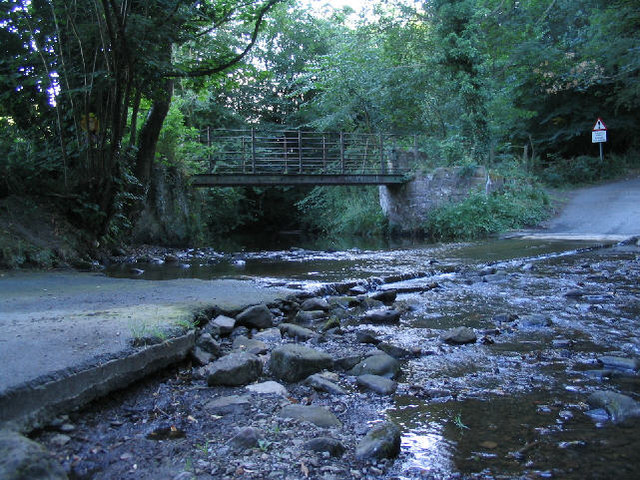
- Ford across the Cegidog, near Ffrith.
- Etymology: From Welsh cegidog, "abounding with hemlock" (cegid), "hemlock place"
- Native name: Afon Cegidog (Welsh)

Location
- Country: Wales

Physical characteristics
- Source
  - location: near Rhydtalog, Flintshire
  - coordinates: 53°4′33.185″N 3°8′52.202″W
  - elevation: 320 m (1,050 ft)
- Mouth: confluence with River Alyn
  - location: Sydallt, Wrexham County Borough
  - coordinates: 53°5′35.402″N 3°1′38.403″W
  - elevation: 60 m (200 ft)

The River Cegidog (Welsh: Afon Cegidog) is a river in north-east Wales. It flows mainly through Flintshire but towards the end of its course it forms the border between Flintshire and Wrexham County Borough.

Its source lies in the hills of southernmost Flintshire to the east of Rhydtalog village. It flows in a roughly north-easterly direction before turning south-east through the villages of Llanfynydd and Ffrith where the Nant-y-Ffrith stream flows into it. It then heads north-east again through a wooded valley before joining the River Alyn at Cefn-y-bedd.

The name of the river indicates a place where hemlock grows.
