= Ffrith =

Village in Flintshire, Wales

Coordinates: 53.090103°N 3.069071°W

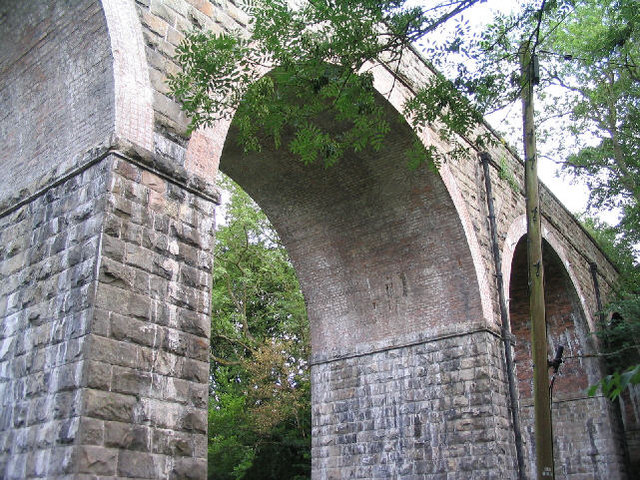
- Ffrith viaduct, built across the Nant-y-Ffrith stream, on the former Wrexham and Minera Railway

- Location within Flintshire
- OS grid reference: SJ285553
- Community: Llanfynydd
- Principal area: Flintshire
- Preserved county: Clwyd
- Country: Wales
- Sovereign state: United Kingdom
- Post town: WREXHAM
- Postcode district: LL11
- Dialling code: 01978
- Police: North Wales
- Fire: North Wales
- Ambulance: Welsh
- UK Parliament: Alyn and Deeside
- Senedd Cymru – Welsh Parliament: Alyn and Deeside

Ffrith is a small village in the community of Llanfynydd in Flintshire, north-east Wales.

== Name ==
The name Ffrith (the Welsh double "f" is pronounced simply as "f") reflects a spelling and pronunciation particular to Flintshire: it is derived from a North Welsh word meaning variously a "pasture", "enclosure" or "forest" and borrowed originally from the Middle English word "frith", meaning a forest or game preserve. The name Belmont or Bell Mount was also commonly used for the village in the 19th century. In local usage the village is usually referred to as "the Ffrith".

== Location ==
The village is situated in the southernmost part of the county in the wooded valley of the River Cegidog at the point where the Nant-y-Ffrith stream flows into it. Neighbouring villages include Cymau to the east, Brymbo to the south-east and Llanfynydd, one mile to the north. The nearest major settlements are Wrexham to the south-east and Mold towards the north-west.

== History ==
Archaeological excavations have revealed evidence of Roman presence in the area. A Roman villa was built here, a Roman road is thought to have passed through and lead mining may have taken place. Several centuries later, Offa's Dyke was constructed across the area.

In 2005 the archaeological television programme Time Team led a dig in the area in conjunction with the Clwyd-Powys Archaeological Trust. Several excavations were conducted throughout the village. Evidence indicates it was a substantial Roman settlement.

In the nineteenth century, the village's size and importance grew as quarrying for limestone and silica and mining for lead and fireclay became more significant. A railway line, the Wrexham and Minera Joint Railway was built through the village and a small station, a number of shops and several pubs opened.

Industry in the area declined through the twentieth century, with the last fireclay level closing in the late 1960s. The railway ceased operation in 1952. A large stone viaduct still stands near the village. The village shops have all closed.

There is a rare example of a packhorse bridge dating from at least the eighteenth century in the village. Welsh groundsel was first discovered near Ffrith in 1948.
