= Coed Talon =

Village in Flintshire, Wales

Coordinates: 53.122°N 3.094°W

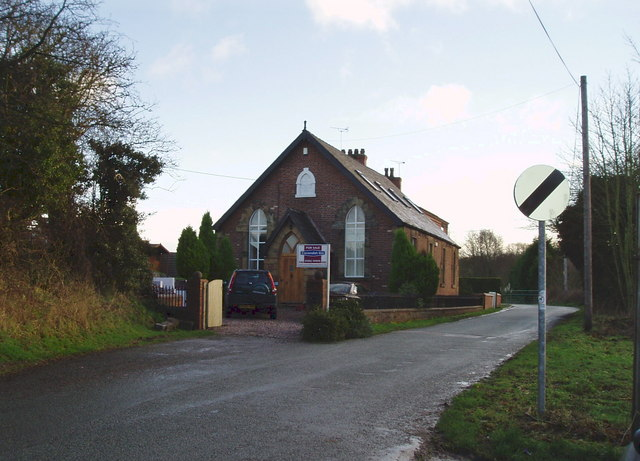
- Former Calvinistic Methodist chapel in Coed Talon

- Location within Flintshire
- OS grid reference: SJ267589
- Community: Treuddyn
- Principal area: Flintshire
- Preserved county: Clwyd
- Country: Wales
- Sovereign state: United Kingdom
- Post town: MOLD
- Postcode district: CH7
- Dialling code: 01352
- Police: North Wales
- Fire: North Wales
- Ambulance: Welsh
- UK Parliament: Alyn and Deeside
- Senedd Cymru – Welsh Parliament: Alyn and Deeside

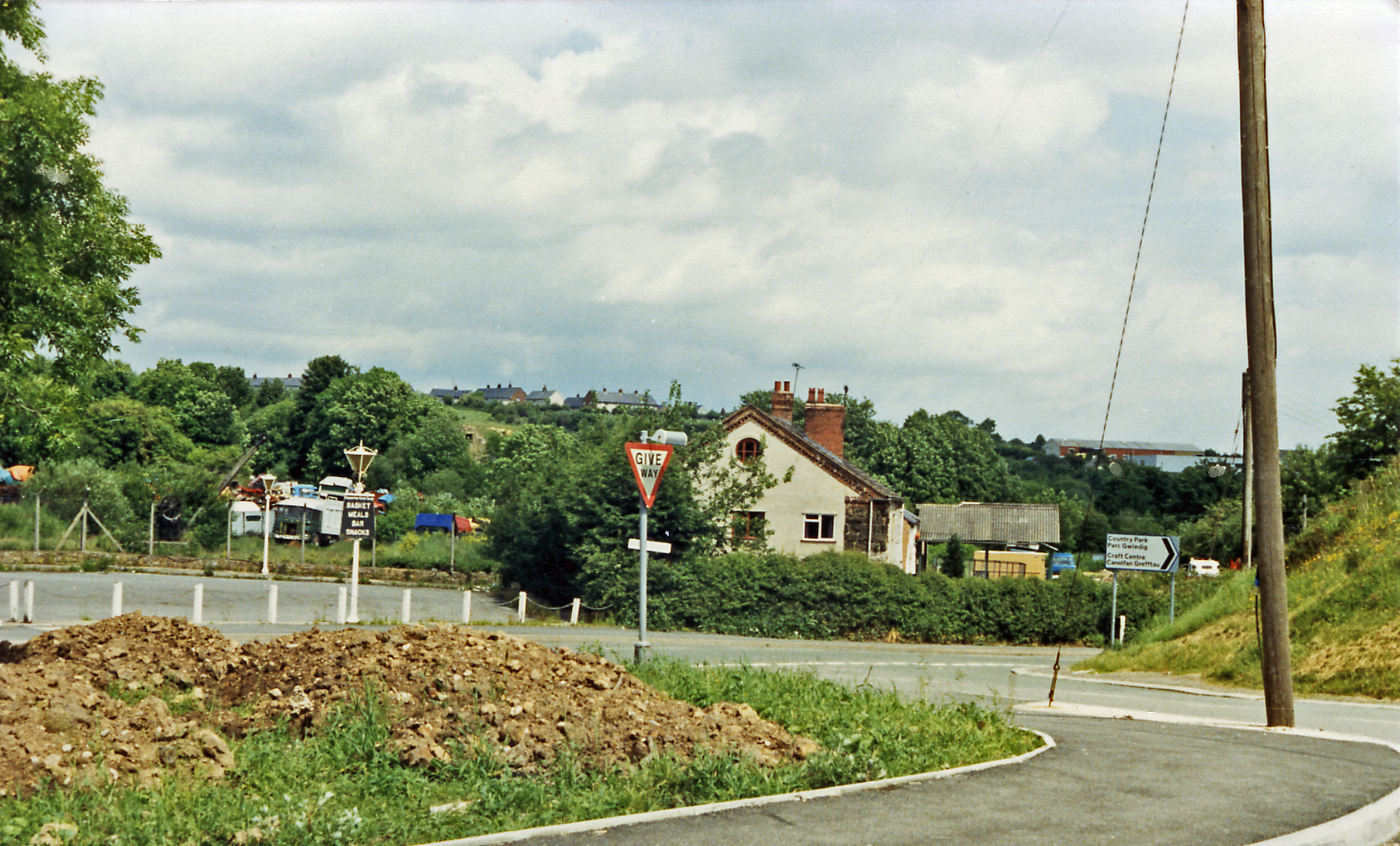
Site of Coed Talon railway station, 1986

Coed Talon (also spelt "Coed-talon") is a small, formerly industrial village between Leeswood and Treuddyn in Flintshire, Wales. Its name is derived from the Welsh word coed ("wood") and the word talwrn, anglicised to "Talon", meaning a "hillside devoid of trees" or "threshing-floor" (perhaps referring to a wood beneath a bare hillside). Other translations of "Talwrn" suggest the words "lumber", "spot" or "field" (reference from University of Wales translation tool).

== History ==
The area, about four miles from the market town of Mold, was primarily agricultural until the nineteenth century, when following the discovery of coal and iron ore seams, an ironworks and a series of collieries were opened. In 1892, a bed of fireclay was discovered and a brickworks was subsequently opened. There was also a silica quarry nearby at Waun y Llyn.

The industries were served by a branch of the London and North Western Railway, who in 1892 introduced a passenger service to Coed Talon, running over part of the Wrexham and Minera Joint Railway to Brymbo in Denbighshire.

The station closed in 1950 and the line to Brymbo was taken out of use shortly afterwards, though goods trains from Mold continued until 1963.

In the 1950s, Coed Talon had a sawmill which was operated by the Jones family at Liverpool House which is still present on the main road through the village. Talon Jones was the main operator of the sawmill (son of Jonathon and Elizabeth Jones who may have owned areas of Coed Talon). It is unknown if Talon Jones was named after the village or vice versa, however, it is interesting that some translations of Talon (or Talwrn) refer to lumber (sawn wood).

== Recent developments ==
The village still has a pub called the Railway Inn. The small-scale colliery workings at Coed Talon operated until 1987, and were subsequently worked by the opencast method. A brickworks also continued in operation at Coed Talon until relatively recently. The village's hotel was sold and converted into dwellings in the 2000s. The steam train used to pass by Coed Talon CP School in the 1950s on its way to & from the Silica Works. Due to the village's close proximity to Treuddyn (and its Welsh-language primary school, Ysgol Terrig), the numbers of Welsh speakers are above the county's average and continue to grow.
