= Wrexham and Minera Railway =

Former railway line

The Wrexham and Minera Railway or Wrexham and Minera Branch was a railway line in North Wales between the city of Wrexham, the village of Brymbo where it served the Brymbo Steelworks, and the lead mines and limeworks at Minera. A further branch ran from Brymbo to Coed Talon, where it connected with lines to Mold. The system was constructed in several stages between 1844 and 1872, while the various lines making up the system closed in 1952, 1972 and 1982.

A directly competing route to Brymbo was opened by the Wrexham, Mold and Connah's Quay Railway in the 1880s. It closed in stages between 1954 and 1970.

== History ==
The railway was one of several constructed to serve the intensive quarrying, mining and iron founding operations in the area west of Wrexham, which were undergoing considerable expansion in the mid 19th century thanks to exploitation of the underlying Middle Coal Measures.

=== Construction ===
The section of line between Brymbo and Minera had originally been part of the former North Wales Mineral Railway, built in 1844 and later incorporated into the Great Western Railway. This line's operation was constrained by the rope-worked inclines, locally known as "brakes", and had two tunnels along its route through the hilly country between Wheatsheaf Junction, near Wrexham, and Brymbo.

Wrexham and Minera Railway Act 1861
- Act of Parliament
- Parliament of the United Kingdom
- Long title: An Act for making a Railway from Wrexham to Minera, and for other Purposes.
- Citation: 24 & 25 Vict. c. xxxii

Dates
- Royal assent: 17 May 1861

As a result of the expanding traffic on the line and the bottleneck created by the inclines, an act of Parliament the Wrexham and Minera Railway Act 1861 (24 & 25 Vict. c. xxxii) proposed that a new railway, the Wrexham and Minera Railway, would be constructed from Croes Newydd, at Wrexham on the main Shrewsbury-Chester line of the Great Western Railway to Brymbo, where it would join the GWR's existing route to Minera. The new railway company would have a capital of £48,000 in total (£36,000 of which would be in shares) and the power to enter into agreement with GWR on operational matters and division of receipts.

George Robert Jebb, who had previously worked on the Shrewsbury-Chester route, was appointed Resident Engineer. After 18 months construction the line was opened without ceremony on 22 May 1862. The new trackbed was dual track and joined the old single track formation just past Brymbo tunnel, thereby removing the use of both tunnels, the Brymbo tunnel was described as "delapidated". The new line involved the construction of twelve bridges, and a large area with six new sidings was provided at Croes Newydd goods station which took over from Wheatsheaf station for invoicing traffic on the line. In June 1866 the line was jointly leased to the GWR and LNWR, within whose "sphere of influence" it fell. A short branch was also constructed through to the colliery at Vron, owned by William Low, one of the Wrexham and Minera company's directors.

In the 1870s a further extension, the Wrexham and Minera Joint Railway, was built from Brymbo through to an end-on connection with the LNWR's Ffrith Branch, which ran from Llanfynydd to Coed Talon near Mold. This line was jointly operated by the GWR and the LNWR - the only line in North Wales to be so operated. The completion of this link through the Cegidog valley not only gave the GWR a route to Mold, but allowed the LNWR access to the North Wales Coalfield.

The construction of the Wrexham-Brymbo line led to the immediate abandonment of the North Wales Mineral Railway's original Brymbo (or "Brake") tunnel and incline. There was a successful application to use one end of the Brymbo tunnel to store explosives in 1872, in which it was stated that the centre of the tunnel had fallen in due to "undermining of the ground". The lower section of the NWMR route from Wheatsheaf Junction, through Summerhill Tunnel, to the collieries in the Moss valley remained in use as the Wheat Sheaf and Ffrwd Branch until 1908.

=== Introduction of passenger services ===
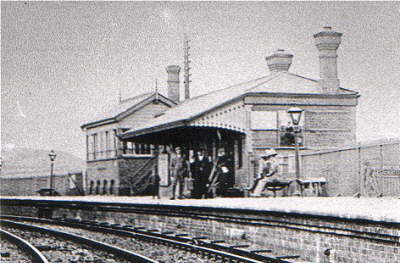
Coedpoeth Station, 1900

Between 1882 and 1905 the GWR gradually introduced passenger services between Wrexham and Minera, in response to requests from local communities. Halts or stations were located at Plas Power (Southsea), the Lodge, Brymbo, Brymbo West, Pentresaeson (for Bwlchgwyn), Coedpoeth, and Vicarage Crossing (Minera), with a passenger terminus at the rather remote Berwig Halt. From 1905 the GWR began operating a railmotor service, with as many as fifteen workings on Saturdays. The LNWR ran its own passenger trains from Mold south to the joint station at Brymbo.

In 1905, the businesses of Coedpoeth campaigned for the Great Western Railway company to lay a new branch from the existing Coedpoeth Station into the village centre. Local business claimed the station was too far away (being effectively located in Minera) to serve them properly and was of little convenience. Regardless, their petition failed miserably. This may have been because the gradient was simply too steep for conventional rail, as well as the little profit for a large undertaking. Despite this situation, Coedpoeth station remained a main focal point for the area, serving several villages with a combined population of around 9000 people.

At the top end of the line, there was a mile-long spur, the New Brighton branch, along the flank of Esclusham Mountain serving the Delafield Minera Leadmines (which operated their own locomotive Henrietta, a Manning Wardle 0-6-0). The mines closed in 1910 and the spur was pulled up, only to be opened again for several years from 1920 to serve silica clay beds.

=== Route ===
The line ran west from Croes Newydd, steadily climbing through the farmland west of Wrexham. Shortly beyond Croes Newydd yard, the GWR's Moss Valley branch (serving several collieries near Moss, with a spur running as far as Ffrwd north of Brymbo) diverged. The main Brymbo branch continued westwards passing the industrial villages of New Broughton and Southsea, where there were connections to more collieries. Swinging northwards and still climbing, it ran along the eastern side of a rather steep valley to Brymbo, where the joint line to Coed Talon diverged just beyond the main joint station. At Brymbo Middle signalbox a short trailing branch south-west to Vron served the collieries there, passing through the steelworks en route. The section from Brymbo West onwards to Minera remained solely in GWR ownership: traversing the rural area west of Brymbo, it passed the brickworks at Cae-llo and the steel company's siding at the Smelt mine, where fireclay and coal were mined, before reaching Minera, 3 miles and 1234 yards beyond Brymbo West. This part of the route featured a large number of level crossings over minor roads.

=== End of passenger traffic ===
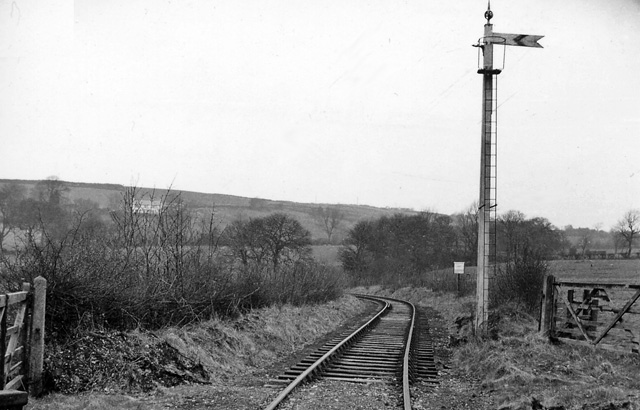
Site of Berwig Halt, near Minera, the final stop for passenger services. Taken in early 1960s.

Competition from new bus services meant that the GWR's passenger service from Wrexham was cut back to Coedpoeth from 1926, and discontinued entirely at the end of 1930, but the small goods office and water tower were left standing at Coedpoeth, as steam locomotives needed replenishing after the hard climb from Croes Newydd. All lines continued in use for freight traffic, however, and the passenger service from Mold to Brymbo (now operated by the LNWR's successor, the LMS) continued with five trains a day on weekdays throughout the 1930s, despite there now being no onward connection to Wrexham.

The end section of the Vron branch was closed in 1930 along with the collieries it served, but part of its length from Vron Junction remained in use to serve the increasing steelworks traffic. Passenger traffic on the joint line from Brymbo to Coed Talon declined during the Second World War, however, with only two passenger trains a day in each direction, largely maintained for schoolchildren attending school in Mold. The passenger service was finally withdrawn in 1950 by British Railways, with the final closure of Brymbo station, although its goods siding remained open. The Brymbo-Coed Talon line was taken out of use in 1952, although it was not formally closed until 1963.

=== Working the route ===
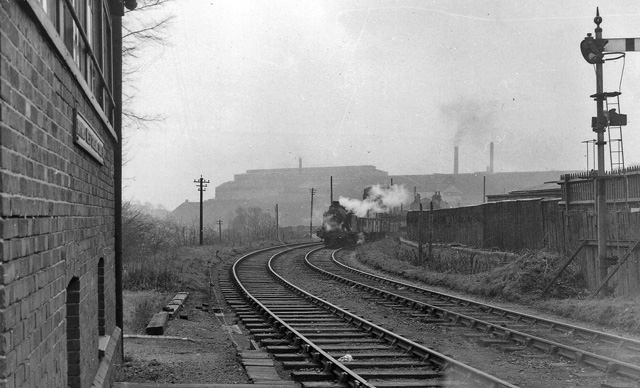
A down freight passing the site of Brymbo West halt, with Brymbo Steelworks in the background.

The route from Croes Newydd to Brymbo was double-tracked, and built to a standard designed to cope with heavy coal and freight trains to and from the steelworks. These trains were usually worked by traincrews from Croes Newydd shed using GWR 2800 Class locomotives based there; given the steep climb from Wrexham to Brymbo, which reached gradients of 1 in 36, a bank engine (such as a GWR 5600 Class locomotive) was often used. The more lightly built section beyond Brymbo West to Minera was worked by smaller locomotives, such as the 5700 Class, with engine 9610 being used almost exclusively on this line.

In later years BR Standard Class 9F and ex-LMS 8F locomotives were also used on steelworks traffic. Steam locomotives continued in use on the line until relatively late under British Railways, with Class 24 and Class 25 diesels being introduced to Croes Newydd shed from 1967–8.

One unusual aspect of workings on the line was that gravity shunting was permitted at Brymbo on shorter trains even as late as the 1970s. The gradients here could be problematic: there was an incident in the 1970s in which a train ran out of control on the former Vron Branch, and broke through level crossing gates in Brymbo.

=== Final closure ===
By the early 1970s the section of line from Brymbo West to Minera saw only two trains a week, and it was closed in 1972, shortly before Minera Limeworks was itself closed. The last part of the system, the 3-mile line from Brymbo West to Wrexham, remained open for freight trains to and from the steelworks, and as late as the mid 1970s there were seven return workings a day. This section of line was taken out of use on 1 October 1982, due to increasing amounts of steelworks traffic being sent by road. The steelworks itself closed in 1990–91, along with a final section of the Vron Branch that had remained in use as part of the works' internal railway system.

=== Today ===
After a period of abandonment, the track was lifted in the late 1980s. Many of the line's bridges and other structures, including the platforms of the former Brymbo station, were not demolished until the 1990s.

A number of structures remain, including a large stone viaduct near Ffrith on the former Joint Railway from Brymbo to Coed Talon.

The Moss Valley spur between Wrexham Maelor Hospital and the site of Moss and Pentre Station has now been re-surfaced as a cycle route.

== Wrexham, Mold and Connah's Quay Brymbo Branch ==
=== History ===
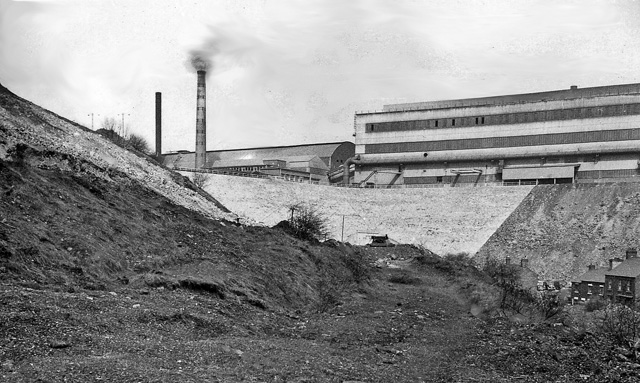
Site of Brymbo (GC) station, immediately beneath Brymbo Steelworks.

The Brymbo branch of the Wrexham, Mold and Connah's Quay Railway (WMCQR) was built to directly compete with the GWR line to Brymbo. Although originally planned in the 1860s, legal challenges by the GWR meant that it was finally constructed in the 1880s after a parliamentary bill for further expansion of the WMCQR line was tabled in 1881; this was passed as the Wrexham Mold and Connah's Quay Railway Act 1882 (45 & 46 Vict. c. ccxxxii); the branch was built and opened to freight traffic in stages, with a full passenger service to Brymbo commencing on 1 August 1889.

The line left the WMCQR main line near Gwersyllt, and ran through the coal mining district of the Moss Valley, with halts at Moss and Pentre and New Broughton, where it passed under the GWR Brymbo branch before turning to run parallel to it. A small halt was provided at Plas Power, nearly adjacent to the GWR halt: there was a connection between the two lines at this point where there were sidings to Plas Power colliery. The line then headed north to Brymbo on the opposite (western) side of the valley to the GWR route; a trailing connection shortly before the tiny WMCQR Brymbo station led to a short branch to Vron and its colliery. The WMCQR terminus at Brymbo was located in a gloomy, cramped and rather inaccessible spot immediately beneath the vast slag tips on which the furnaces of Brymbo Steelworks had been built.

Although the branch handled a reasonable volume of freight, passenger services on the line were never especially successful and the Great Central Railway, which had absorbed the WMCQR, discontinued them on a 'temporary' basis in 1917. They were never restarted. As a result of the Railways Act 1921, the GCR was absorbed by the London and North Eastern Railway, Brymbo becoming its most westerly outpost. The branch, sections of which had a 'difficult' combination of sharp curves and steep gradients, was worked by J58, and then by four Kitson & Co. J60 class locomotives based at Wrexham, later being replaced by J94s.

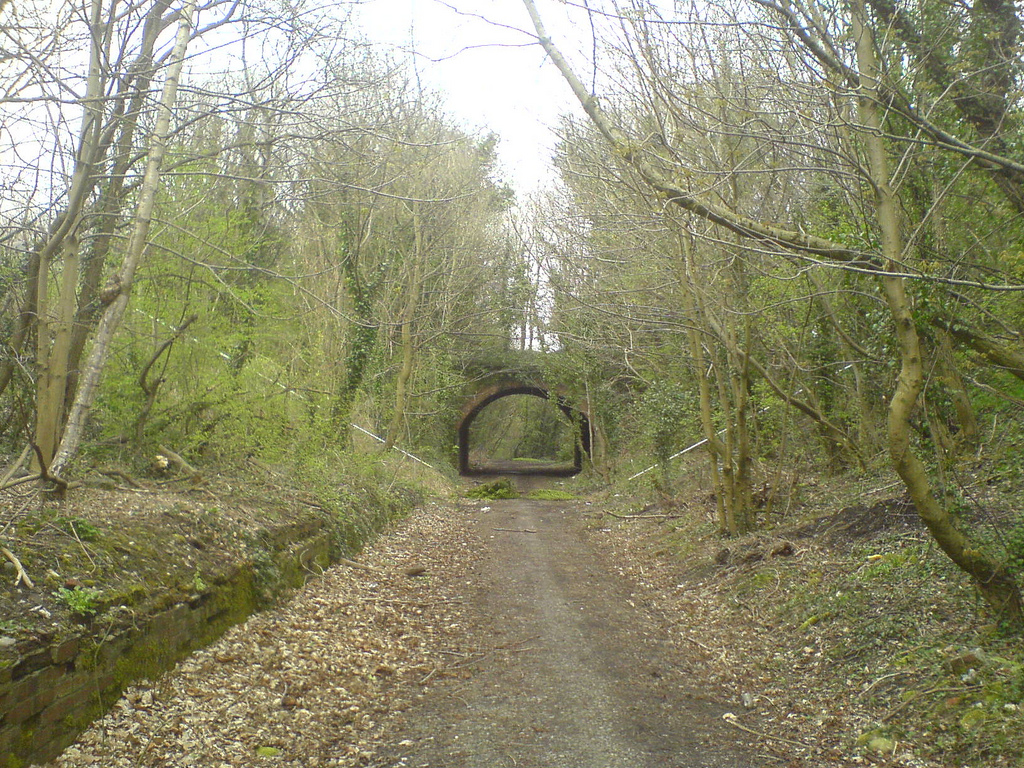
Site of Moss and Pentre Railway Station as of early 2008. The GWR Moss Valley branch (closed in 1935 although the track was not lifted until 1952) ran over the overbridge

Rather surprisingly given its duplication of the GWR route, parts of the WMCQR Brymbo branch remained open under British Railways until as late as 1970. After initial closure in 1954, a section from Gwersyllt to a coal distribution centre at Gatewen was reopened in 1958, while part of the top end of the line, from a reinstated connection with the ex-GWR line at Broughton Forge Junction (Plas Power) to the site of the former WMCQR Brymbo station and on to Brymbo Fishponds Sidings, was not taken out of use until 1970.

=== Today ===
Many of the line's structures have disappeared since the 1970s, but its formation can still be traced (and walked as a footpath) from New Broughton to Moss Valley, where there are a number of bridges. A large brick bridge still stands across the B5101 road south of Brymbo.

== Gallery ==
Gallery of locations on the former line.

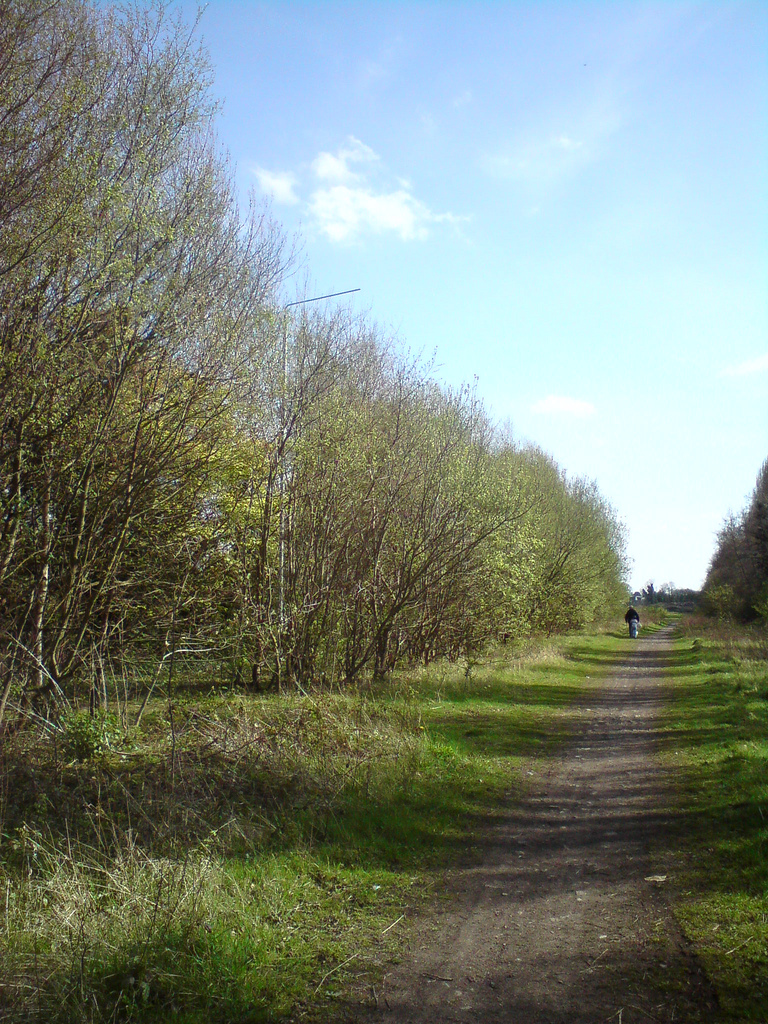
Site of the trackbed in 2009 on the Moss Valley spur, near Gatewen Colliery

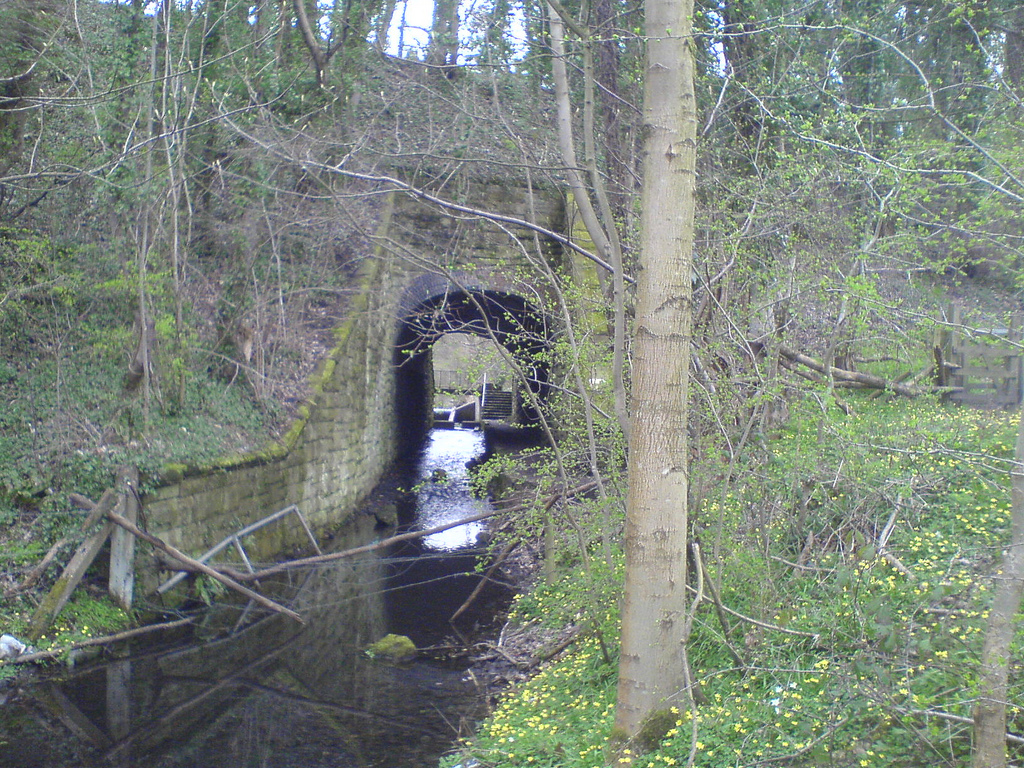
Tunnelled stream runs beneath the Brymbo Branch embankment, which splits the Moss Valley

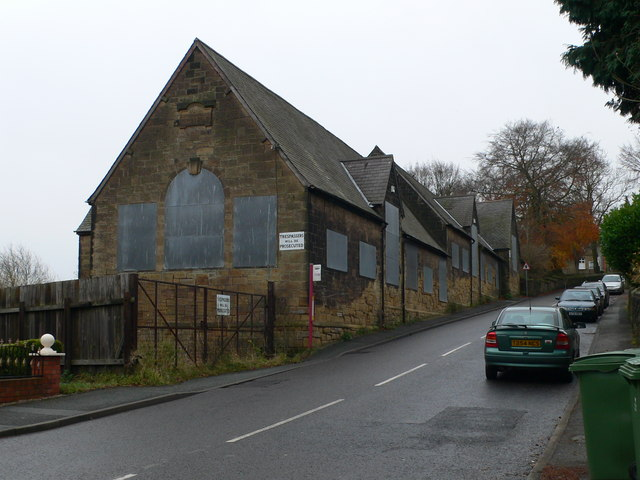
The large gate at foreground left was until the 1980s the site of the level crossing at Brymbo West, where the line crossed Brymbo High Street.

== Sources ==
- Christiansen, R. Forgotten Railways - North and Mid Wales, David & Charles, 1984
