= Maeshafn =

Village in Denbighshire, Wales

Coordinates: 53°08′24″N 3°11′39″W

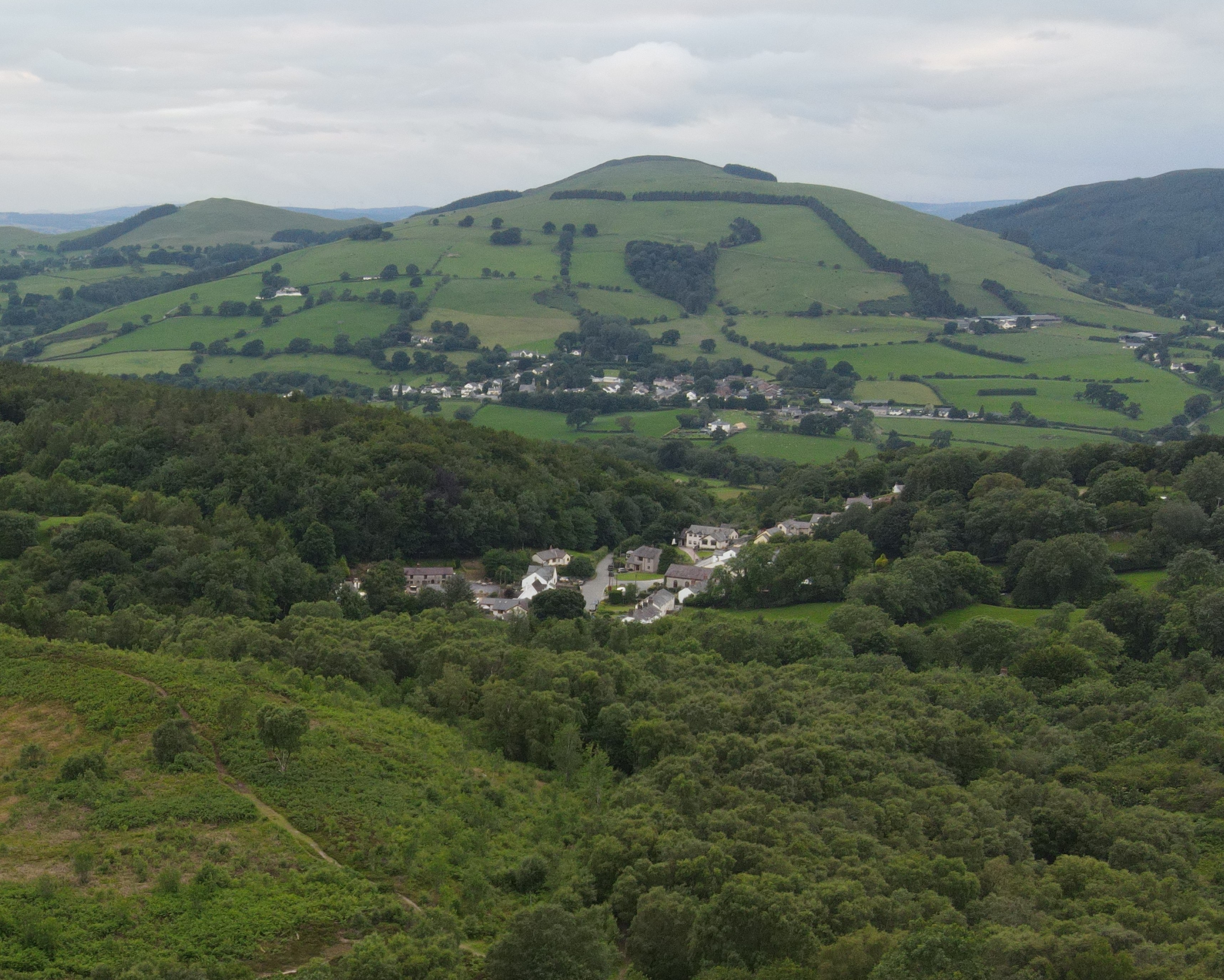
- Maeshafn from Moel Findeg

- Location within Denbighshire
- OS grid reference: SJ201610
- Community: Llanferres
- Principal area: Denbighshire
- Country: Wales
- Sovereign state: United Kingdom
- Post town: MOLD
- Postcode district: CH7
- Dialling code: 01352
- Police: North Wales
- Fire: North Wales
- Ambulance: Welsh
- UK Parliament: Clwyd East
- Senedd Cymru – Welsh Parliament: Clwyd West

Maeshafn is a small village in Denbighshire, Wales, near the border with Flintshire.

Maeshafn lies several miles to the southwest of Mold. Overlooked by Moel Findeg hill, the River Alyn flows to the west, and Loggerheads Country Park is towards the north towards the A494 road.

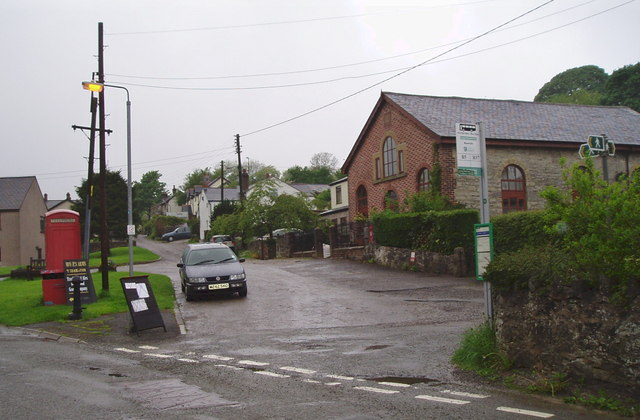
Maeshafn

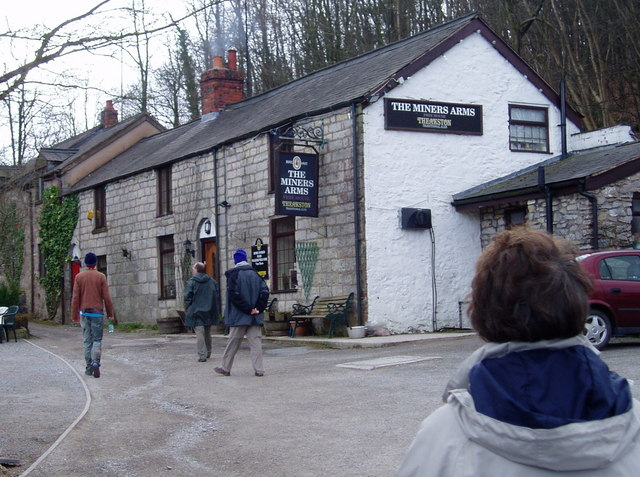
''The Miner's Arms'' public house, Maeshafn

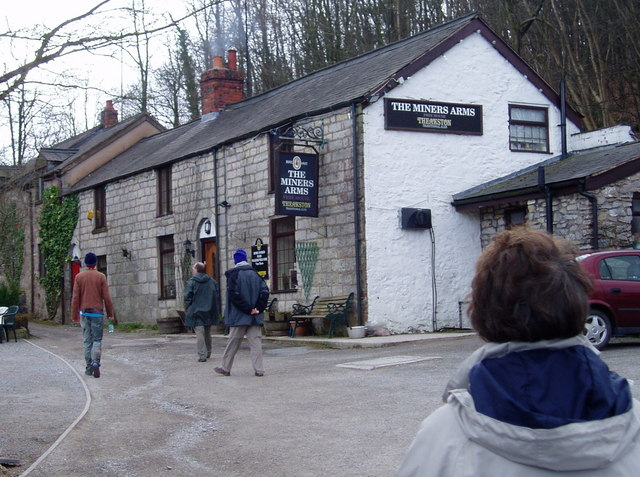
''The Miner's Arms'' public house, Maeshafn

== History ==
Historically Maeshafn was a lead mining village called Maes y safn. The East Maes-y-Safn Lead Mining Company operated in the area. A 1980 publication noted that the local miners would "build a house themselves by encroaching on the waste and enclosing a small field". Their cottages were typically bungalows, with just one or two rooms and two or three beds.

== Landmarks ==
No shops remain today in the village, but there is a pub called the Miners Arms, which originally served as the pay office for the miners. Nearby is Maeshafn Cave, near Big Covert Wood, a long-fissure cave which along with Gop Cave was cited in 1970 as the only caves in North Wales which have unearthed artifacts from the Bronze Age. The cave, also known as Big Covert or Llanferres Cave, was excavated by J. G. Morris in 1954.

A quarry is situated about 600 metres (2,000 ft) to the south of Maeshafn. It received approval for limestone extraction in 1950 and developed in subsequent decades to become an important regional producer of limestone by the early 1980s. In 1982-4 proposal were made to extend mining at the quarry to 800,000 tonnes per annum, which was approved in 1987. The quarry was owned by Welsh Aggregates Ltd. from 1976, which changed their name to Bodfari (Quarries) Ltd in 1991. In 1998 it was purchased by Tilcon (South) Ltd., a subsidiary of Anglo American plc, and was later bought by Tarmac Central Ltd.

== Transport ==
Maeshafn is connected by bus to Eryrys, Graianrhyd, Llanarmon-yn-Iâl and Llanbedr.
