= Treuddyn =

Village and community in Flintshire, Wales

- Village and community
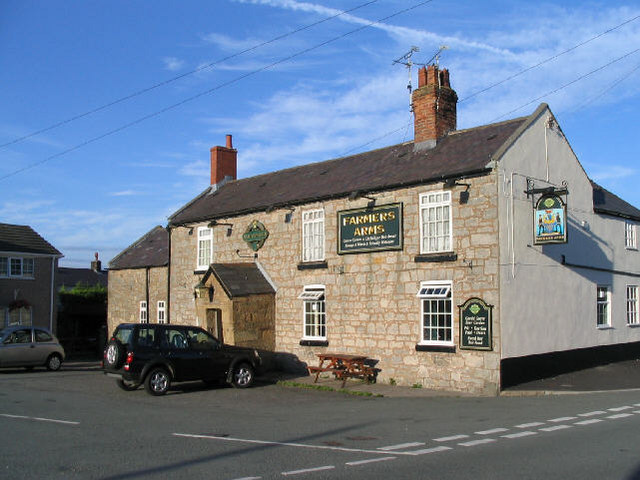
- Treuddyn's pub, the Farmers Arms

- Location within Flintshire
- Population: 1,627 (2011 Census)
- OS grid reference: SJ252583
- Principal area: Flintshire
- Preserved county: Clwyd
- Country: Wales
- Sovereign state: United Kingdom
- Post town: MOLD
- Postcode district: CH7
- Dialling code: 01352
- Police: North Wales
- Fire: North Wales
- Ambulance: Welsh
- UK Parliament: Alyn and Deeside
- Senedd Cymru – Welsh Parliament: Alyn and Deeside
- Website: treuddyn.org.uk
- List of places UK Wales Flintshire 53.116°N 3.118°W Map of the community

Treuddyn is a village, community and electoral ward in Flintshire, Wales, located just off the A5104 road, around 4 miles south-east of Mold and 3 miles north-west of Caergwrle. The community includes the nearby village of Coed Talon, to the east, and Rhydtalog, to the south-west on the Denbighshire border.

There are two primary schools: Ysgol Terrig, which is a Welsh medium school and Ysgol Parc y Llan, which is an English medium school. The closest secondary schools are Ysgol Maes Garmon (Welsh) and Alun School (English) in Mold, 4.5 miles away. There is also a Post Office and shop.

Treuddyn has its own church, St Mary's, and there are also two active chapels in the village. A third chapel, that of the Baptist denomination, has closed. There are many Bronze Age cairns in the area. It was an industrial area during the 19th and 20th centuries, with mining of coal, iron and lead. There was a distillery to extract oil from the coal, and a blast furnace between 1817 and 1865. In 1834 around 450 men were constantly employed in the collieries and other industries.

Treuddyn is also an electoral ward, coterminous with the community. It elects one county councillor to Flintshire County Council.

== Demographics ==
=== Population ===
==== Number ====
According to the 2021 Census, Treuddyn's population is 1,686. Treuddyn's population was 1,627 at the 2011 Census.

=== Languages ===
According to the United Kingdom Census 2021, 20.7 per cent of all usual residents aged 3+ in Treuddyn can speak Welsh. 31.4 per cent of the population noted that they could speak, read, write or understand Welsh. The 2011 census noted 24.4 per cent of all usual residents aged 3 years and older in the village could speak Welsh.

=== Country of Birth ===
The 2021 Census noted that 97.4 per cent of Treuddyn's population was born in the United Kingdom. The 2011 Census noted that 98.2 per cent of the population was born in the United Kingdom; 59.9 per cent of the population was born in Wales and 37.5 per cent of the population born in England.
