= Alyn Gorge =

Gorge of the River Alyn, Wales

The Alyn Gorge is a gorge section of the River Alyn north between Loggerheads and Rhydymwyn in Wales. The west side of the valley rises gently to Moel Famau, while the east bank is along parts a cliff with evidence of tram lines and old quarry workings.

The path along the edge of the gorge is well maintained, with metal bridges and barriers across sites which are popular with climbers.

The character of the gorge changes at Cilcain where a small bridge crosses the watercourse at 53°10.660′N 3°13.012′W. The water sinks into the river bed a hundred metres north from this place and enters the caves Ogof Hen Ffynhonnau and Ogof Hesp Alyn, which were discovered in the 1970s after the watertable had changed due to the mine-workings earlier in the century.

High on the east bank near these two entrances is the small cave of Ogof Nadolig.

The Alyn Gorge and caves have been designated as a Site of Special Scientific Interest (SSSI)
