= Rhydtalog =

Village in Flintshire, Wales

Coordinates: 53.086°N 3.144°W

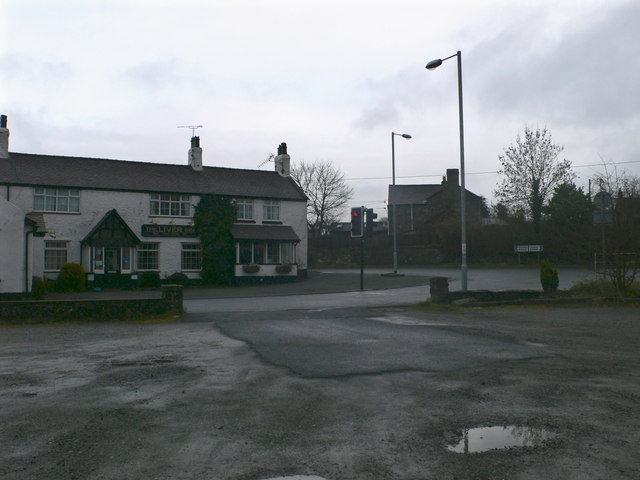
- Road junction at the centre of Rhydtalog

- Location within Flintshire
- OS grid reference: SJ233549
- Principal area: Flintshire
- Preserved county: Clwyd
- Country: Wales
- Sovereign state: United Kingdom
- Post town: MOLD
- Postcode district: CH7
- Dialling code: 01824
- Police: North Wales
- Fire: North Wales
- Ambulance: Welsh
- UK Parliament: Alyn and Deeside
- Senedd Cymru – Welsh Parliament: Alyn and Deeside

Rhydtalog is a small, isolated village in Flintshire, Wales. It lies in hilly country on the border with Denbighshire in the community of Treuddyn.

The current name translates as "Talog's ford", but it was given as "Rhydhalawg" in 1699, and it seems likely that it was originally Rhydhalog, "dirty ford", and later changed due to the old name's negative associations. There is no ford in the village now, but there is a bridge over a tributary of the River Terrig immediately to the north-west. The River Cegidog also rises in the area.

The surrounding countryside is high pasture and moorland; the nearest villages are Graianrhyd, to the north-west, and Treuddyn, to the north-east. Rhydtalog is at the junction of the A5104 and B5430 roads. There used to be a pub, the Liver Inn (pronounced as in Liver bird) but it closed in 2007. The original name of this public house was the Libertas Inn as shown on the Ordnance Survey Map of 1872 Flintshire XVI. The same source also shows another public house across the road named the Travellers Inn.

There was formerly an isolation hospital nearby in the hamlet of Blaenau; this was converted into a hostel in the 1970s.
