= St Garmon's Church =

St Garmon's Church may refer to one of several churches in Wales dedicated to Saint Germanus of Auxerre. The Welsh place name, Llanarmon, means "church of Saint Garmon".

- St Garmon's Church, Abersoch
- St Garmon's Church, Betws Garmon
- St Garmon's Church, Capel Garmon
- St Garmon's Church, Castle Caereinion
- St Garmon's Church, Llanarmon, Gwynedd
- St Garmon's Church, Llanarmon Dyffryn Ceiriog
- St Garmon's Church, Llanarmon Mynydd Mawr
- St Garmon's Church, Llanarmon-yn-Iâl
- St Garmon's Church, Llanfechain
- St Garmon's Church, St Harmon

== See also ==
- St German's Church, Cardiff
