= Alyn Valley Woods and Alyn Gorge Caves =

Protected area in Clwyd, Wales

- Site of Special Scientific Interest
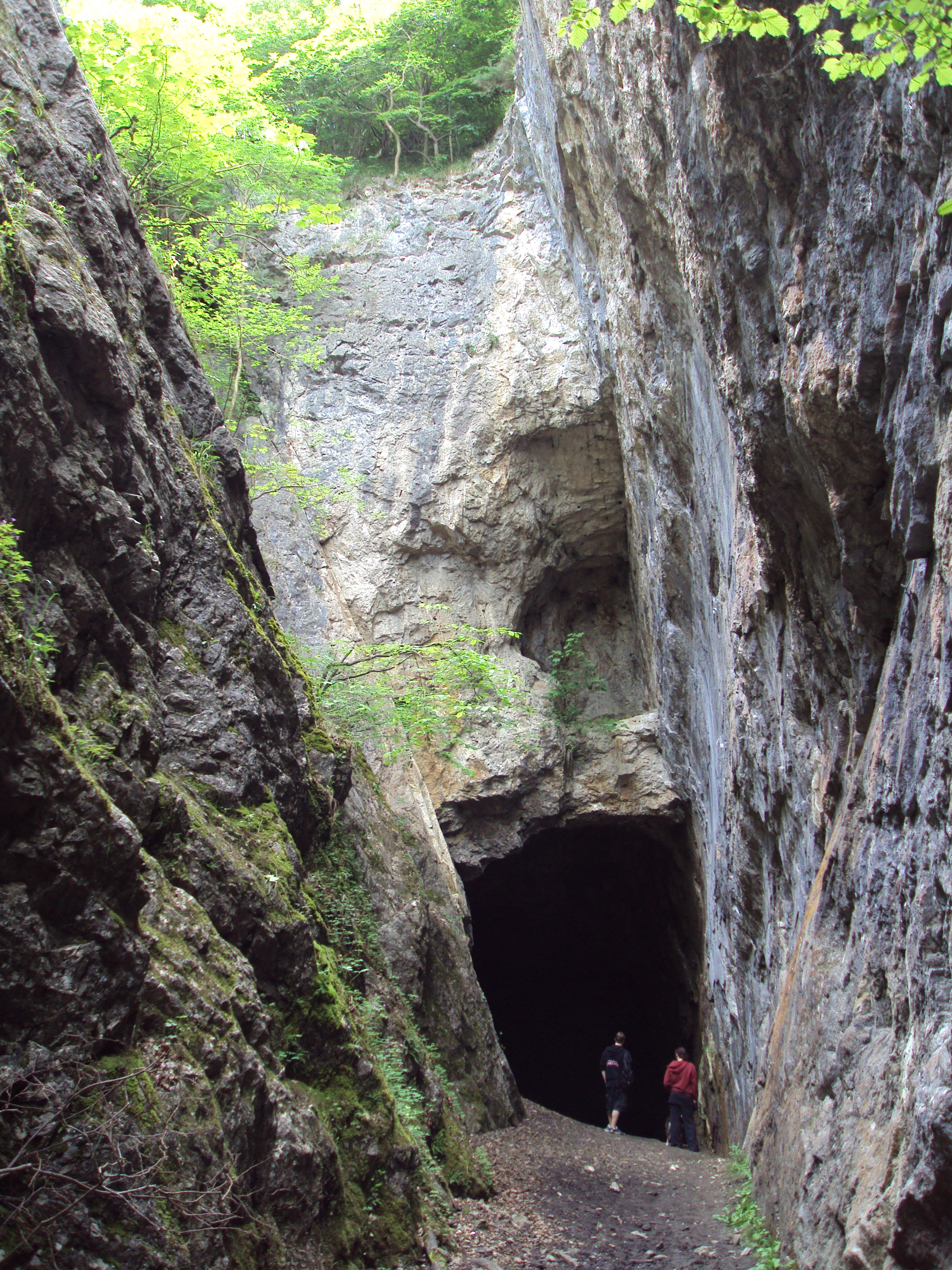
- Devil's Gorge

- Location within Wales
- Location of Alyn Valley Woods and Alyn Gorge Caves.
- Area of search: Clwyd
- Grid reference: SJ1800864866
- Coordinates: 53.174561°N 3.2281478°W
- Interest: Biological and Geology
- Area: 191.1 ha (472 acres)
- Notification date: 1 January 1957

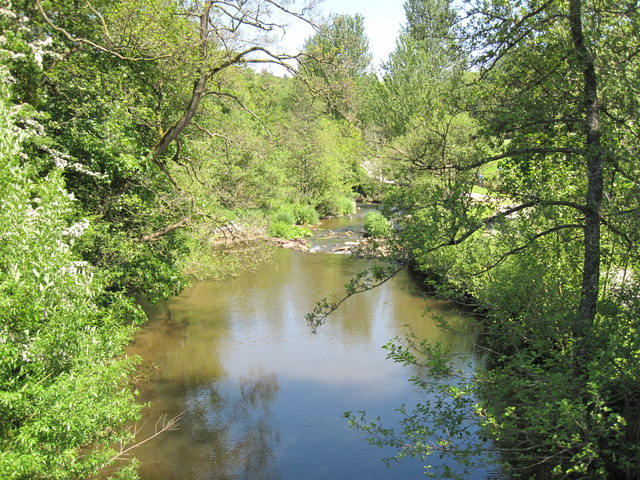
River Alyn near Loggerheads

Alyn Valley Woods and Alyn Gorge Caves is a Site of Special Scientific Interest on the border of Flintshire and Denbighshire in north Wales. Most of the site is also designated as the Alyn Valley Woods Special Area of Conservation and the southern part includes Loggerheads Country Park. The SSSI has an area of 190.3 hectares while the SAC covers 168.3 hectares.

A large part of the site is covered by broadleaved woodland with sessile oak, ash and sycamore among the dominant tree species. Notable plants in the woods include stinking hellebore, green-flowered helleborine and wayfaring tree. There are also areas of calcareous grassland with plants such as bloody cranesbill and lesser meadow-rue. Much of the site lies on an escarpment of Carboniferous limestone and there are three cave systems: Ogof Hesp Alyn, Ogof Hen Ffynhonnau and Ogof Nadolig. Lead ore, zinc ore, limestone and calcite were formerly mined in the area.

== See also ==
- List of Sites of Special Scientific Interest in Clwyd
