= Llanferres =

Village in Denbighshire, Wales

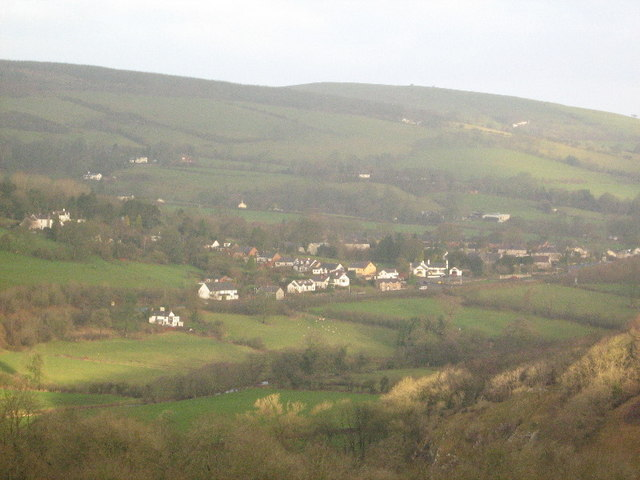
- Llanferres from the slopes of Bryn Alyn

- Location within Denbighshire
- Population: 827 (2011)
- OS grid reference: SJ188604
- Community: Llanferres
- Principal area: Denbighshire
- Preserved county: Clwyd
- Country: Wales
- Sovereign state: United Kingdom
- Post town: MOLD
- Postcode district: CH7
- Dialling code: 01352
- Police: North Wales
- Fire: North Wales
- Ambulance: Welsh
- UK Parliament: Clwyd East
- Senedd Cymru – Welsh Parliament: Clwyd West
- List of places UK Wales Denbighshire 53.137°N 3.214°W Map of the community

Llanferres is a village and community in the county of Denbighshire in Wales. At the 2001 Census the population of the village was recorded as 676, increasing to 827 at the 2011 census.

== Geography ==
It is located 230 metres above sea level in the upper valley of the River Alyn on the A494 road between Ruthin and Mold.

The village lies on the eastern slopes of the Clwydian Hills, just south of Moel Famau, and is wholly within the Clwydian Range and Dee Valley Area of Outstanding Natural Beauty. The village sits alongside the Welsh Assembly A494 Trunk Road on bus routes providing access to the nearest towns Mold and Ruthin. Offa's Dyke National Trail passes one mile to the southwest of the village. The Parish or Community Council of Llanferres area includes the village of Maeshafn and hamlets of Tafarn-y-Gelyn and Loggerheads.

== Notable landmarks ==
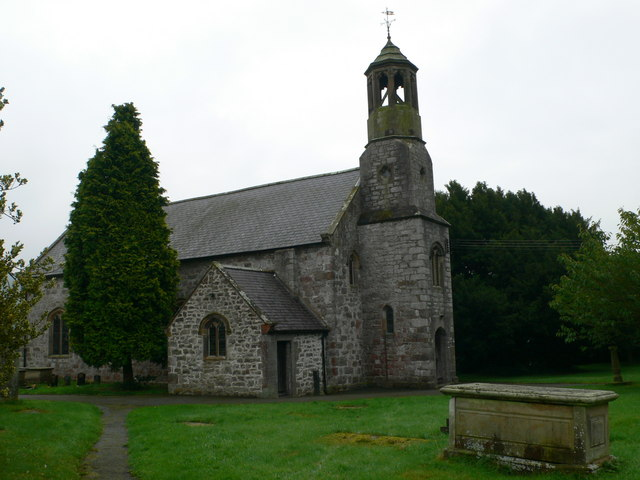
St. Berres'

The parish church, is dedicated to St. Berres, a 4th-century to 5th-century Welsh hermit, who according to Thomas Pennant was a disciple of St. Martin of Tours. Originally medieval, the church was mentioned in the 'Lincoln Taxation' of 1291. It was largely rebuilt in 1774/1775, with additions in 1843. There were further additions, and a major restoration, in 1892. A visit will be enhanced by the guide pamphlet available in the Church.

The popular climbing spot Pot Hole Quarry is located within Llanferres.

=== Colomendy Hall ===
Colomendy Hall, on the Llanferres to Ruthin road, is a Grade II listed building. Its gardens and landscaped park are listed, also at Grade II, on the Cadw/ICOMOS Register of Parks and Gardens of Special Historic Interest in Wales. The Welsh landscape painter Richard Wilson lived at the hall in the latter part of his life and died there in 1782.
