= River Terrig =

River in north-east Wales

Terrig
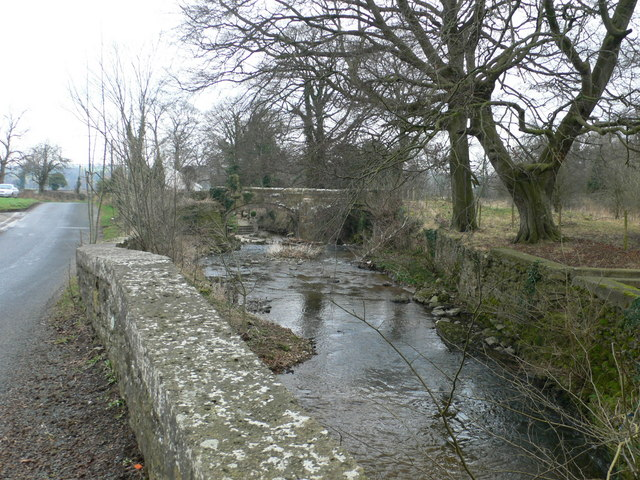
- The Terrig near Leeswood Old Hall.
- Etymology: From Welsh terydd, "swift", or terig, "violent, harsh"
- Native name: Afon Terrig (Welsh)

Location
- Country: Wales
- Counties: Denbighshire, Flintshire

Physical characteristics
- Source
  - location: Llyn Cyfynwy, near Graianrhyd, Denbighshire
  - coordinates: 53°4′58.28″N 3°10′13.49″W
  - elevation: 370 m (1,210 ft)
- Mouth
  - location: confluence with River Alyn, Flintshire
  - coordinates: 53°8′56.929″N 3°6′1.595″W
  - elevation: 95 m (312 ft)

The River Terrig (Welsh: Afon Terrig) is a small river in north-east Wales.

The river rises at Llyn Cyfynwy near Graianrhyd village in the community of Llanarmon-yn-Ial, Denbighshire, about three miles from the source of the River Alyn. It then flows northwards and eastwards, forming the boundary between the old parishes of Nercwys and Treuddyn. At Nant-y-Mynydd it is joined by several small springs from Mynydd Ddu, and finally itself joins the River Alyn at Pontblyddyn, Flintshire.

The Terrig is a habitat for brown trout. Its name is derived from its rapid flow after times of heavy rain; Thomas Pennant, in his Tours in Wales, described it as "the Terrig, or the violent, [...] often of a tremendous swell and fury".
