= Thomasina Pidgeon =

Canadian rock climber (born 1975)

Personal information
- Nationality: Canadian
- Born: 28 March 1975 (age 51) Newfoundland
- Education: University of Victoria, BC
- Occupation: Rock Climber
- Website: ThomasiaPidgeon.com

Climbing career
- Type of climber: bouldering
- Highest grade: Bouldering: V12 (8A+)
- Major ascents: FFA of Zero Zero V10 (7C+); FFA of The Egg V11 (8A); FFA of Water Hazard V11 (8A); over 20 V11 Ascents; FFA of Barefoot on Sacred Ground V12 (8A+)
- Known for: First Canadian female to climb V10, V11, and V12 boulders.
- Updated on 7 June 2025

Darlene Thomasina Pidgeon (born 1975) is a Canadian rock climber known for being one of the world's strongest female boulderers in the early 2000s and 2010s, was for a time the strongest female Canadian boulderer, was the first Canadian female to climb the grades of V10, V11, and V12, and is a former IFSC World Cup climber for Team Canada. She has been featured in several international magazines and websites and her image has been used in advertising, magazine galleries, and guidebook and magazine covers. In 2025 Pidgeon was one of the main subjects of the Reel Rock 19 Film The Cobra and the Heart which shared the story of her daughter Cedar and ex-partner, renowned Swiss trad climber Didier Berthoud. She is a climber, writer, and activist.

Thomasina's daughter Cedar Pidgeon was also featured in The Cobra and the Heart and currently climbs for Team Canada on the IFSC circuit.

== Early life ==
Pidgeon started climbing near Flatrock in her early 20s on a trip home to her native Newfoundland. Soon after she moved to Whistler, British Columbia, and climbed occasionally at small local sport climbing areas like Nordic Rock and Rogue's Gallery while working several jobs with the goal of visiting Europe for an extended trip. With the money she'd saved she got a working visa and went on a year-and-a-half long trip to Wales, Ireland, parts of Eastern Europe, and Morocco. She learned to traditional climb in Wales, but most of the trip was spent visiting new places. She returned to Canada, moved to Kelowna, and began studying sciences at Okanagan University College. She continued climbing while in school and after a year and a half she moved to Vancouver to work and climb as much as possible. She got a job at Mountain Equipment Co-op and began climbing at The Edge climbing gym in Vancouver. She injured her shoulder, kept climbing on it, and eventually was unable to lift her arm above shoulder level. After a year off of climbing her arm had not improved so she visited a physio-therapist and with the exercises he taught her she was able to strengthen her shoulder and climb again. She began spending much of her time outside on the boulders at the base of the world-famous granite monolith "The Chief" in Squamish, BC.

Pidgeon quickly became integrated into the Squamish climbing community and in 2001 she moved to Squamish, where she spent many years living in a van.

Pidgeon has a degree in Political Science from the University of Victoria and is active in environmental causes and supporting the rights of van dwellers.

== Climbing career ==
=== Bouldering ===
In her first decade of climbing Pidgeon quickly became one of the most progressive female boulderers in the world, opening the doors to the harder grades by making First Female Ascents (FFAs, not to be confused with the traditional usage of FFA in climbing) of many double digit problems.

V10 - In 2001 Pidgeon made an ascent of Zero Zero in Squamish, BC. The problem had previously been climbed by American climber Tiffany Campbell. Pidgeon had only climbed a handful of harder moderates at the time and for a climber of her level, much less a female climber, to try a V10 was considered ridiculous. Nevertheless, Pidgeon picked her project and after only a handful of days of effort she sent the problem. It was one of the first female V10 ascents in the world and the first by a Canadian woman. It was another year before Pidgeon began climbing V10 again, but that year was quite productive with ascents in Squamish, Hueco Tanks (Texas), Bishop (California), Little Cottonwood Canyon (Utah), and an area in Nova Scotia. 2004 saw two more ascents and 2005 one. In 2006 Thomasina became pregnant with her daughter Cedar and did not begin climbing seriously again until 2008 when Cedar was old enough to travel. That year Thomasina made four more V10 ascents. Since then she has kept up the pace, sending several V10 and harder problems each year. As of August 2011 she has sent over 40 V10s.

V11 - Pidgeon was the first Canadian woman and one of the first women in North America to climb V11. As of August 2011 she has done over 20 V11s, almost all FFAs. Her first was "The Egg" (FFA) in Squamish in 2008. She quickly followed that ascent with Water Hazard (2nd ascent, FFA, Bishop), La Belette (FFA Bishop), Lucky Charms (FFA Squamish), and Beefy Gecko (Bishop), all in 2008. In 2009 she managed "Encore En Fois" (Squamish), and in 2010 she went back on the road and did 8 more V11s, 7 of which were FFAs. Perhaps most impressive was her FFA and 2nd try ascent of "The Hand" in Hueco.

V12 - Pidgeon was the first Canadian woman and one of the first women in North America to have climbed V12, and she for a long time was one of only a few female boulderers in the world to have climbed multiple V12 boulder problems. As of 2011 she has climbed 7 V12s-- "The Butterpumper" (FFA Hueco Tanks, February 2009), "Rumble in the Jungle" (Hueco Tanks, March 2009), "Barefoot on Sacred Ground" (FFA Hueco Tanks, January 2010), "Summoning Sit" (FFA Squamish, June 2010), "Sur Le Tois" (FFA, Squamish, September 2010), "Beautiful Gecko" (FFA since break, Bishop, March 2011), and "The Aquarium" (FFA Bishop, March 2011). She has also done two slash grade (V11/12) problems -- "Sarah Sit" (Hueco Tanks, 2004), and "Chablanke" (Hueco Tanks, February 2010).

=== Routes ===
==== Sport ====
- "Technical Ecstasy" (13b)
- "Presto" (13a)
- "Young Blood" (13a/b)
- "Golden Boy" (13b)

==== Trad ====
- "The Grand Wall" (5.11+)
- "The Daily Planet" (12a)

For a full list of Pidgeon's bouldering and route ascents search for her scorecard on climbing ranking site 8a.nu. or see her personal site.

=== Canada ===
- 2015 - IFSC Boulder World Cup - Toronto - 28th (2nd overall Canadian)
- 2015 - Canadian National Bouldering Championships - 12th
- 2015 - BC Bouldering Provincials - 3rd
- 2014 - IFSC Boulder World Cup (CAN_ - 33rd
- 2014 - Canadian National Bouldering Championships - 5th
- 2014 - Tour de Bloc Regionals - Quebec - 4th
- 2012 - Tour De bloc - Montreal - 2nd
- 2012 - Tour De Bloc - Ontario - 2nd
- 2009 - Tour De Bloc - Kelowna, British Columbia - 1st
- 2008 - November Sessions - Vancouver - 3rd
- 2007 - November Sessions - Vancouver - 1st
- 2007 - Rockfall - St. John's, Newfoundland - 1st
- 2005 - Petzl Roc Trip - Squamish - 2nd
- 2005 - Pebble Wrestle - Abbotsford, BC - 1st
- 2005 - Tour De Bloc - Richmond, BC - 1st
- 2004 - Crag X ABS6 Comp - Victoria, BC - 1st

=== International ===
- 2014 - Bouldercup - Germany - 1st
- 2014 - Bavarian Boulder Battle - Germany - 1st
- 2014 - Soul Moves - Germany - 1st
- 2013 - IFSC Boulder World Cup - Slovenia - 35th
- 2010 - Hueco Rock Rodeo - 2nd
- 2009 - Hueco Rock Rodeo - 1st
- 2006 - Boulder Fest - Australia - 1st
- 2006 - Boulder Fest Overall - Australia - 2nd
- 2005 - Seoul International Bouldering Competition - Korea - 4th
- 2004 - Seattle Bouldering Challenge - Seattle, USA - 2nd

== Media ==
=== Magazines and Climbing News Sites: Print and Online ===
- 8a.nu (Online, Global)Thomasina does Beautiful Gecko
- Climbing Magazine (Print & Online, USA) Beautiful Gecko Short Web Article
- Dead Point Magazine (Print & Online, USA & Global)Double-Digits Article
- Dead Point Magazine Women in Hueco Article
- Xtreme Spots Thomasina Pidgeon on Xtreme Spots.com
- Gripped Magazine (Print, Canada)Squamish and Motherhood
- Gripped Magazine Gripped Magazine Thomasina
- UK Climbing (Online, United Kingdom) Girls climbing 8A
- Urban Climber Magazine (Print & Online, USA) Interview with Urban Climber
- Urban Climber Magazine The X Factor Article
- Urban Climber Magazine Mention in Female Crushing Article
- Wayback Machine
- Squamish Climbing Magazine Vail World Cup | Interview with Thomasina Pidgeon
- Squamish Climbing Magazine Vail World Cup | Interview with Thomasina Pidgeon part 2
- The Climbing Collective The Collective

=== Video & Podcast Appearances ===
- Reel Rock 19 | The Cobra and The Heart
- Thomasina climbing Beautiful Gecko on Deadpoint Magazine
- Video including Thomasina climbing Barefoot on Sacred Ground
- Thomasina was one of 5 athletes to be featured in The Season 2, a 22 episode web TV show.The Season 2
- Epic TV: Thomasina Pidgeon on being a Dirtbag Climber | Climbing Daily, Ep. 641
- Training Beta
- Climber in "Herman Hesse Memorial Hospital" commercial for US TV, 2008 the commercial
- Featured climber in the Top 20 Boulder Classics of NA, N. Condor film, 2006 Top 20 Classic Boulder Problems of North America - Synopsis

=== Books ===
- Contributed to Quality Lesson Plans for Outdoor Education
