= Nic Parry =

Welsh football commentator

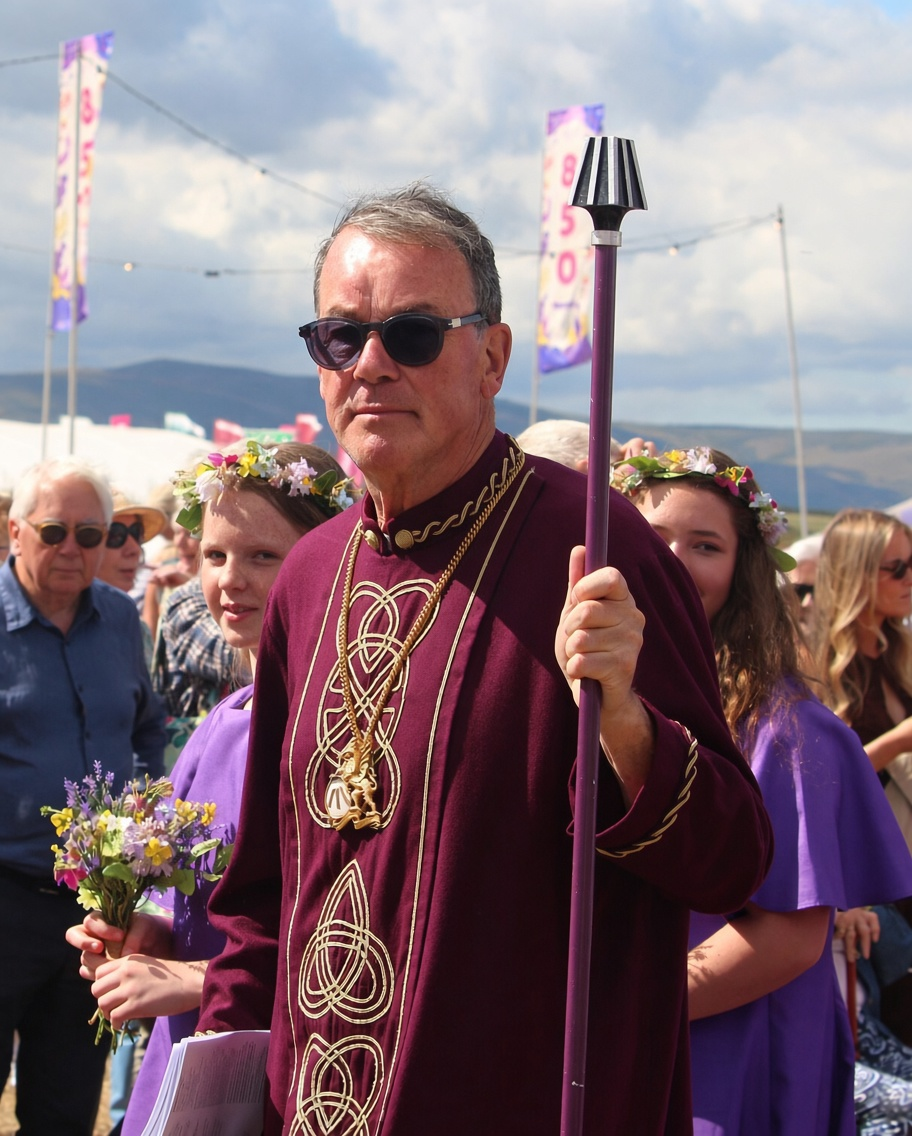
Parry in 2026

Nic Parry is a commentator on Welsh football on BBC in English and S4C in Welsh. He is the regular presenter of the Welsh language football programme Sgorio. He also hosts the sports quiz for young people, Pen Campau.

He worked as a part-time recorder in the Crown Court from 2001 and was appointed a Crown Court judge on 2 March 2010.

He was a pupil at Ysgol Maes Garmon, Mold.

Judge Niclas Parry, then a solicitor, attended the 1996-1999 Waterhouse Inquiry where he represented some of those accused of child abuse. Following over a decade of criticism that justice was not done and abusers escaped justice in 2012 David Cameron announced another Inquiry into the validity of the Waterhouse Inquiry.

He was appointed National Eisteddfod Court President and Chair of the Management Board in 2025.
