= Rock climbing in Wales =

Wales is a United Kingdom centre of rock climbing. Occasional harsh winters provide winter climbing.

The main area of focus is the mountains and crags of Snowdonia. Good quality sport climbing on limestone is available at Llandudno and at Pot Hole Quarry, and on slate at the quarries in Llanberis and Dinorwic. There is good quality sea cliff climbing in Pembrokeshire, the Gower Peninsula, Ogmore. Also at South Stack Anglesey.

More limited climbing opportunities exist in South Wales. These are usually to be found in limestone outcrop and quarry areas, such as the Llangattock escarpment or Morlais. The Sandstone quarries of the South Wales valleys underwent sustained development in the early to mid 90s and form a popular local sport climbing destination. There are also opportunities in the Wye Valley on both sides of the Wales / England border.

== See also ==
- Climbers' Club
- South Wales Mountaineering Club
