= Milwr Tunnel =

Mine drainage passage in North Wales

Coordinates: 53.2200°N 3.1743°W

The Milwr Tunnel is a mine drainage adit running some 10 miles from the hamlet of Cadole near Loggerheads, Denbighshire to Bagillt on the Dee Estuary in North Wales. It was originally built to drain the lead mines beneath Halkyn Mountain, which were plagued with flooding in their lower levels, but enabled the exploitation of new lodes and was variously used for the extraction of lead, zinc and limestone during its working history. It is part of a network of mines, lodes and natural cave systems – the Halkyn United Mines – that extends for up to 100 kilometres, the longest in the United Kingdom.

It forms part of the mine drainage system that is responsible for draining Ogof Hesp Alyn and leaving much of the River Alyn between Loggerheads and Rhydymwyn dry during summer months.

== Construction ==
The first phase of the tunnel was driven by the Holywell-Halkyn Mining and Tunnel Company, a consortium of local mines, under the supervision of engineer Nathaniel R. Griffith of Wrexham. The Company was formed in 1896, its Secretary and Manager being John Philip Jones, and its directors listed as the Hon. C. T. Parker, H. A. Cope, J. B. Feilding, T. Snape, John Brock, Henry Taylor, and Eustace Carey. The mines involved hoped that the construction of the tunnel, by allowing them to work rich seams of ore at depth without incurring high pumping costs, would enable them to meet their low-cost international competition head-on.

Tunnelling was commenced in July 1897 at Boot End, Bagillt, from a point 9 feet below high water mark on the Dee foreshore, where self-acting flood doors were fitted. It was driven at a gradient of 1:1000, initially brick lined where it passed through coal measures and shale, and unlined after the first 1.5 miles where it passed through chert and limestone, successively reaching the Pen-yr-Hwylfa, Dolphin, Drill, Coronation and Caeau veins; a branch tunnel accessed the Old Milwr vein. In 1908 driving stopped 2 miles from the portal at Caeau Mine, the limit of the company's mineral rights, at which time the tunnel was draining some 1.7 million gallons of water per day through the drainage channel cut in its floor.

== Extension ==
Objections to further work had been raised in Parliament and by residents of Holywell, who feared that the proposed drainage would affect their water supply, and particularly that of the famous St Winefride's Well. Supporters of the Milwr and District Mines Drainage Bill pointed out that mining had already been carried out in the area without substantial disruption to the area's water supply.

However, legal changes passed in 1913 allowed the HMTC to continue driving the tunnel, at rates of up to 45 feet weekly, to a point beneath Halkyn Mountain by 1919. At 6am on 5 January 1917, the tunnel broke into a "loch", or flooded cavern, at the intersection of the Pant Lode: 10,000 gallons of water a minute flowed into the tunnel, sweeping away trucks and seriously hampering work for some weeks. 11 hours later St Winefride's Well, where water from the Halkyn Mountain system had resurged several miles away, ran dry as the water table fell. Water was eventually restored to the well via the Holywell Boat Level.

Following takeover by the Halkyn District United Mines Ltd in 1928, the tunnel was progressively extended, reaching Olwyn Goch in 1931 and intersecting several valuable and productive new veins. Low lead prices in 1938 caused the majority of the workforce to be temporarily laid off, but Pilkington's Glass began using the tunnel to excavate high-quality limestone from 1939; this quarrying continued until 1969, creating large artificial caverns west of Olwyn Goch.

Lead mining commenced again in earnest in 1948 after ore prices climbed, and the tunnel was driven further south through several new lodes, in 1957 reaching a point at lode 477, the Cathole Vein, at which large quantities of sand and clay were being forced into the tunnel: no further extension was made beyond this point. In 1962, the Holywell-Halkyn Mining and Tunnel Co. Ltd, together with Halkyn District United Mines Ltd, became subsidiaries of Courtaulds, which wished to maintain the tunnel to supply water to its factory at Holywell. Lead mining was still carried out sporadically from existing veins until 1977, and maintenance work continued until 1987, when the tunnel finally closed. During its period of operation the tunnel had produced around 200,000 tons of lead ore and 80,000 tons of zinc ore.

== Powell's Lode ==
The tunnel system intersects with many mines as well as several natural cave systems, including the remarkable Powell's Lode Cavern on the Rhosesmor branch tunnel. This is a natural passage at least 110 metres (361 feet) from top to bottom, at least 60 metres of which is flooded by a natural lake (the full depth of the lake was never measured, and large amounts of mining debris dumped into it have since reduced its depth to 42 metres). The cavern can therefore claim to be the highest such natural cavern in the UK.

== Today ==
The Milwr Tunnel was purchased by Welsh Water in 1992 in order to supply water to industry; as of 1997 it still discharges an average of 23 million gallons of water per day. The tunnel is currently maintained by United Utilities. Although a complete trip through to the portal is no longer possible due to roof falls and consequent flooding in the lower sections, occasional access is permitted to cavers and mine explorers, who have mapped many of the old workings. Some abandoned mining equipment and several miles of the tunnel's railway system remain in-situ.
