= Gareth Glyn =

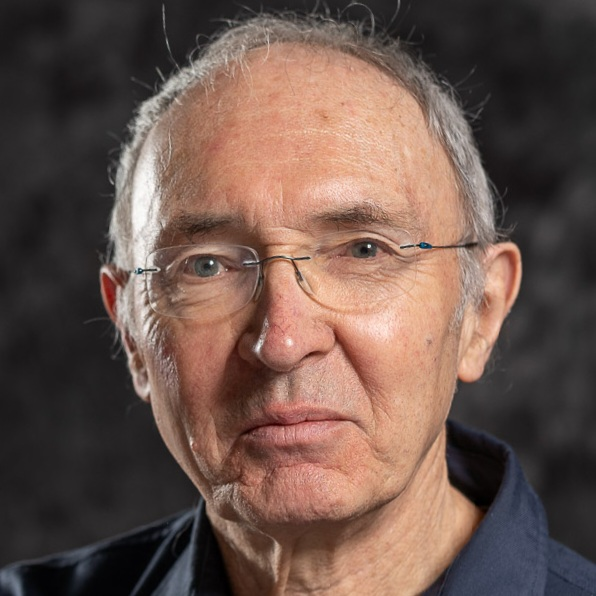
- Gareth Glyn in 2025

Background information
- Birth name: Gareth Glynne Davies
- Born: 2 July 1951 (age 73); Machynlleth, Wales
- Genres: Contemporary classical music
- Occupation(s): Composer, arranger
- Years active: 1973–present

Gareth Glyn, born Gareth Glynne Davies (born 1951), is a Welsh composer and radio broadcaster.

== Life and education ==
Born in Machynlleth, Wales, Glyn is the eldest son of the late Welsh poet T. Glynne Davies. He received his secondary education at Ysgol Maes Garmon in Mold, before attending Merton College, University of Oxford, 1969–72, studying music and specialising in composition.

== Compositions ==
He has composed a wide range of musical pieces, including diverse vocal and orchestral work and music for television. He has produced one symphony, and many of his recorded orchestral works are in the light music genre, including A Snowdon Overture, Legend of the Lake and Anglesey Seascapes. In 2011, to coincide with his 60th birthday, a double CD of a selection of his orchestral works was released by Sain, including the substantial Enduring City celebrating the 300th anniversary of the founding of the city of New Bern.

In 2012, he was selected to provide the arrangement of Elgar's Nimrod for the opening ceremony of the London Olympic Games; it was played by 80 East London children, some of them beginners on their instruments and aged as young as 7, alongside a small number of London Symphony Orchestra (LSO) members. It is estimated that this broadcast was seen by a billion or more viewers worldwide.

Orchestras who have commissioned and/or performed his compositions include - in addition to the LSO - the BBC Concert Orchestra, the North Carolina Symphony, the Strasbourg Philharmonic Orchestra, the Ulster Orchestra, the BBC National Orchestra of Wales, I Musici de Montréal and the Royal Ballet Sinfonia; soloists include Bryn Terfel and Catrin Finch.

For his services to music, Gareth Glyn was made an Honorary Fellow of the Bangor University, and an Honorary Druid of the Gorsedd of Bards of the Island of Britain. He has made “a significant contribution to the music of Wales”.

== Broadcasting ==
Glyn used to present the news and current affairs programme Post Prynhawn, broadcast on BBC Radio Cymru from Mondays to Fridays in the 5–6pm slot. He was the programme's main presenter from when it was first broadcast in 1978 until January 2013.
