= Emma Jones (journalist) =

Welsh journalist

- Born: 23 May 1975 (age 51); Mold, Flintshire, Wales
- Education: Mold Alun School; University of Staffordshire
- Occupation: Journalist

Emma Jones (born 23 May 1975) is a Welsh journalist.

== Education ==
She attended Mold Alun School and Staffordshire University.

== Career ==
She joined the Evening Leader newspaper in her home town of Mold. Jones worked on a variety of stories.
