= Mold Town Hall =

Municipal Building in Mold, Wales

- Neuadd y Dref Yr Wyddgrug (Welsh)
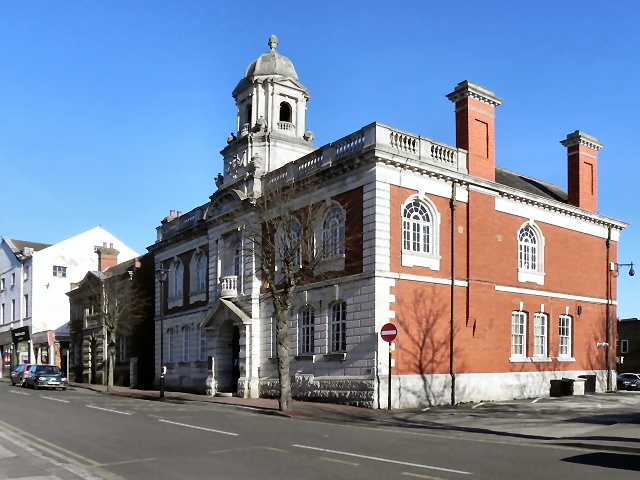
- Mold Town Hall

- Shown in Flintshire
- 53.1674°N 3.1432°W
- Location: Earl Road, Mold

History
- Built: 1912

Site notes
- Architect: Frederick Andrew Roberts
- Architectural style: Edwardian Baroque style

Listed Building – Grade II
- Official name: Town Hall
- Designated: 30 March 1987
- Reference no.: 364

Mold Town Hall (Welsh: Neuadd y Dref Yr Wyddgrug) is a municipal structure in Earl Road in Mold, Wales. The town hall, which serves as the meeting place of Mold Town Council, is a Grade II listed building.

== History ==
The first municipal building in Mold was the Leete Hall which was built on the corner of the High Street and New Street and was completed in 1470. After the Leete Hall became dilapidated, it was demolished and replaced by the Assembly Rooms which were designed by Alfred Lockwood in the neoclassical style and completed in 1849. The Assembly Rooms were arcaded on the ground floor, so that markets could be held with a large assembly hall on the first floor: a third floor was added in 1874, shortly before the building was acquired by the local board of health in 1882. (Note: The third floor became a night club which hosted the rock band, the Beatles, in January 1963: the third floor was demolished in 1985 and the building is now occupied by Lloyds Bank.)

Following significant population growth, largely associated with Mold's status as a market town, the area became an urban district in 1895. In this context, a local businessman who had made his money manufacturing rubber heals, Peter Edward Roberts of Bromfield Hall, offered to contribute £5,000 towards the cost of a purpose-built town hall.

The foundation stone for the new building was laid by the benefactor's wife, Mary Roberts, on 22 June 1911. It was designed by Frederick Andrew Roberts in the Edwardian Baroque style, built in red brick with stone facings and was officially opened on 1 October 1912. The design involved a symmetrical main frontage with five bays facing onto Earl Road; the central bay, which slightly projected forward, featured a recessed doorway with a keystone flanked by pilasters supporting an open triangular pediment. There was a stone balcony and a round headed French door on the first floor flanked by Ionic order columns and banded pilasters supporting an entablature. The outer bays were fenestrated by segmental sash windows on the ground floor and round headed windows on the first floor. At roof level, there was a modillioned cornice, a balustraded parapet, a central segmental pediment and a square cupola with aediculae and a dome on a hexagonal base. Internally, the principal rooms were the council chamber, the lecture hall, the free library and the reading room. The local member of parliament, James Woolley Summers, donated £100 to establish an initial collection of books for the library.

In 1924, the council discovered that the new town hall had already suffered some structural damage caused by subsidence associated with local coal mining. The building served as the headquarters of the Mold Urban District Council for much of the 20th century but ceased to be local seat of government when the enlarged Delyn District Council was formed in Holywell in 1974. The town hall subsequently became the offices and meeting place of Mold Town Council.

A public square created just to southwest of the town hall to commemorate the life of the novelist, Daniel Owen, was re-opened, following a major-revamp, in October 2015.
