= St Garmon's Church, Llanarmon-yn-Iâl =

Coordinates: 53.0965°N 3.2100°W

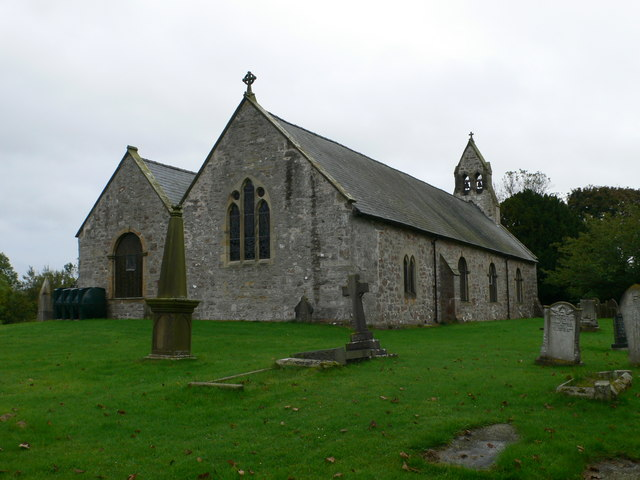
- St Garmon's Church, Llanarmon-yn-Iâl, from the southeast
- St Garmon's Church, Llanarmon-yn-Iâl
- OS grid reference: SJ190561
- Location: Llanarmon-yn-Iâl, Denbighshire
- Country: Wales
- Denomination: Anglican
- Website: St Garmon's Church, Llanarmon-yn-Iâl

History
- Dedication: St Garmon

Architecture
- Heritage designation: Grade I
- Designated: 19 July 1966
- Architect: John Douglas
- Architectural type: Church

Specifications
- Materials: Stone with a slate roof

Administration
- Province: Church in Wales
- Diocese: St Asaph
- Archdeaconry: St Asaph
- Deanery: Dyffryn Clwyd
- Parish: Llanarmon-yn-Iâl

Clergy
- Vicar: Rev Phillip Chew

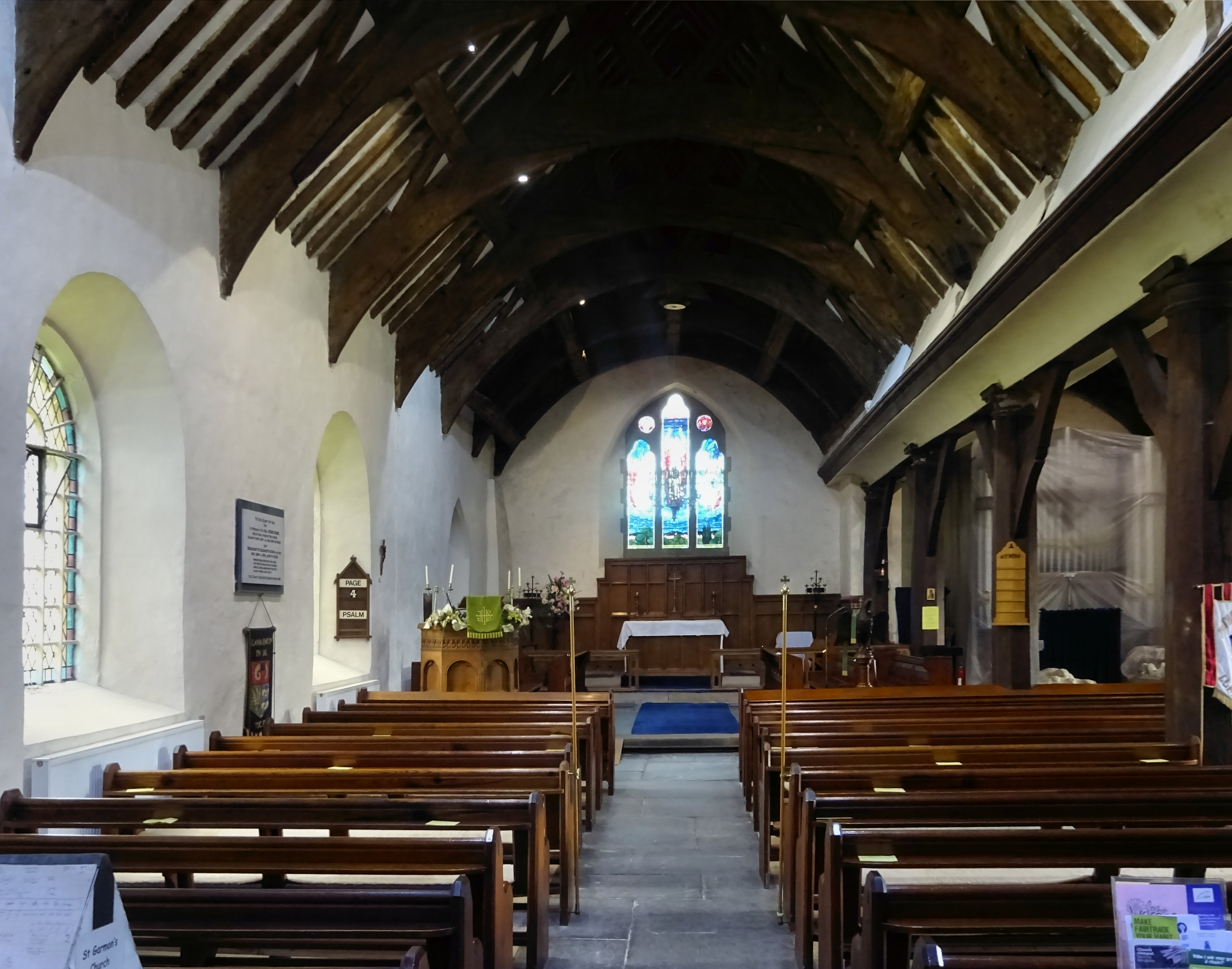
St Garmon's Church, Llanarmon-yn-Iâl

St Garmon's Church is in the centre of the village of Llanarmon-yn-Iâl, Denbighshire, Wales. It is an active Anglican church in the diocese of St Asaph, the archdeaconry of St Asaph and the deanery of Dyffryn Clwyd. It is designated by Cadw as a Grade I listed building.

== History ==
The church dates from 1282; a second nave was added about 1450. Much of the church was rebuilt in 1736. Around that time, Edward Whetnall, a carpenter from Wrexham, replaced the stone arcade between the two naves with an arcade in timber. In 1759 a gallery was built at the west end of the south nave, and it was extended in 1781. It is likely that the porch was enlarged in 1774. In 1870 the church was restored by John Douglas, adding some Gothic-style windows and bracing to the colonnade. The box pews were also removed, and it is likely that the gallery was removed at this time. There were further restorations in 1906, in the late 1920s, and in the 1970s.

== Architecture ==
=== Exterior ===
The church is built in stone, mainly limestone with some sandstone. The roof is of slates with grey ridge tiles. Its plan consists of a double nave. The north nave is wider than the south and at its east end is the chancel. The south nave acts as an aisle, with its east end partitioned to act as a vestry. There is a south porch and a bellcote at the west end over the north nave. The porch has a ball finial and sandstone ridge tiles. The bellcote has apertures for two bells. The division between the north nave and the chancel is marked by a buttress. The medieval arch-braced roofs are still present. Some round-headed windows remain from the 1736 restoration. Other windows are Gothic in style and probably date from Douglas' restoration.

=== Interior ===
Inside the church is a baluster font dated 1734 and a pulpit which has been attributed to Douglas. The brass chandelier dates from the 15th or early 16th century, and contains a figure of the Virgin Mary in a canopy. Two of the monuments date from the early 14th century and another is dated 1639. The Royal Arms date from 1740.

== External features ==
The church is in the middle of a churchyard which is almost square with rounded corners, overlooking the River Alyn. In the churchyard is the shaft of a churchyard cross which was converted into a sundial in 1774. The churchyard also contains the war grave of a soldier of World War I.

== See also ==
- List of church restorations, amendments and furniture by John Douglas
