= Llanarmon =

Llanarmon may refer to one of several villages in Wales:

- Llanarmon, Gwynedd, also known as Llanarmon Eifionydd
- Llanarmon Dyffryn Ceiriog, Ceiriog Valley near Wrexham
- Llanarmon Mynydd Mawr, a small settlement and parish in Powys
- Llanarmon-yn-Iâl, Denbighshire
