= Robert Bryan (poet) =

Welsh poet and composer (1858–1920)

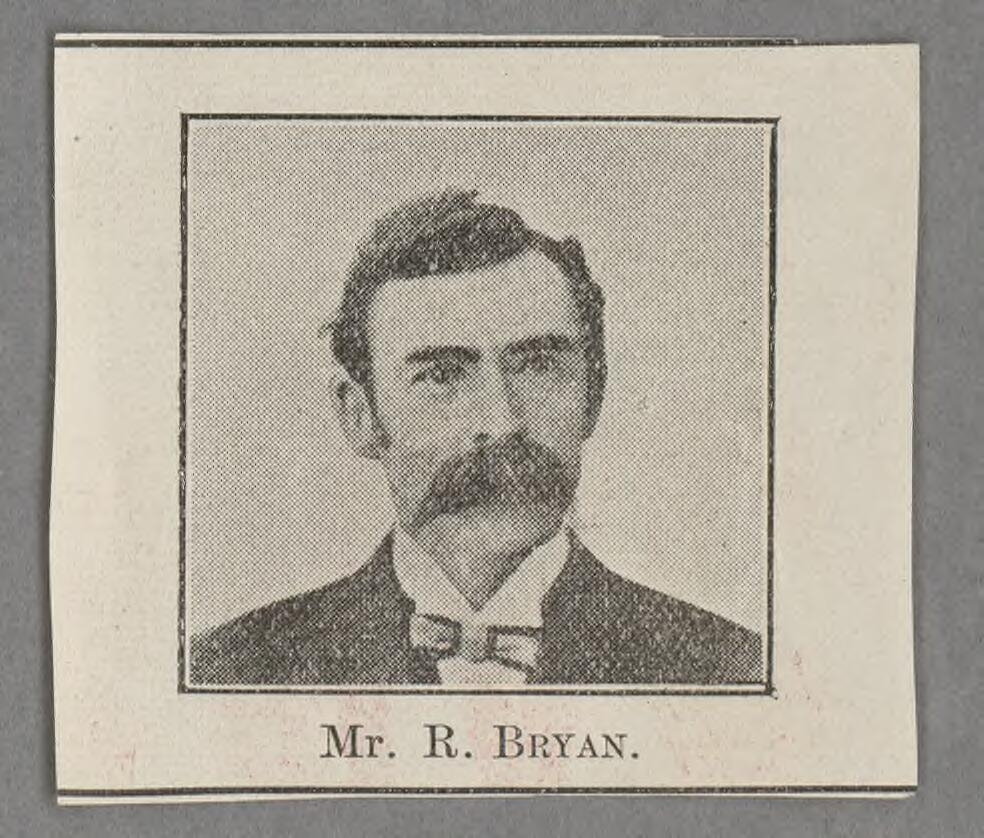
Robert Bryan (poet)

Robert Bryan (1858 – 5 May 1920) was a Welsh poet, composer and folklorist.

== Life ==
He was born at Llanarmon-yn-Iâl, Denbighshire, Wales, son of Edward and Elinor Bryan . He was a pupil and a pupil teacher at the Wrexham British School and then educated at the Normal College, Bangor, the University College of Wales, Aberystwyth, and at Oxford. He was forced to discontinue his studies at Oxford in 1893 without attaining a degree because of ill health. He lived at Wrexham and Marchwiel until 1903 when he moved to Caernarfon, where his brothers, Edward and Joseph Davies Bryan, had a house. His brothers ran a successful retail business in Egypt with large stores in Cairo and Alexandria, and branches in Port Said and Khartoum. Robert Bryan spent most of his winters there, returning to Caernarfon each summer.

Between 1905 and 1909 he was a teacher at Rhostryfan.

He died in Cairo, Egypt, on 5 May 1920, and was buried there. He was unmarried.

== Works ==
Poems by him were published in Oldlau Can (1901). Another volume Tua'r Wawr, was published posthumously in 1921.

He wrote music arrangements at the request of David Thomas, of Bangor whilst he was teaching. They were written for Alun Mabon of Ceiriog.

== Bibliography ==
Poems

- Odlau Cân (Llanuwchllyn, 1901)
- Tua'r Wawr (1921)

Music (As editor):

- Alawon y Celt - Celtic tunes (two volumes, 1905)
