= Pot Hole quarry =

Limestone quarry near Mold, Wales

Pot Hole
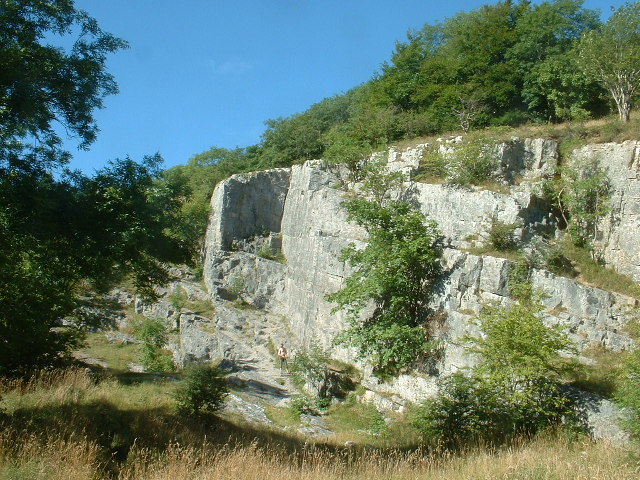
- The quarry viewed from the south, in August 2005

- The quarry's position in Denbighshire
- Location: Near Llanferres, Denbighshire, Wales, United Kingdom; 53°7′41.1″N 3°12′35.1″W
- Products: Limestone
- Type: quarry

Pot Hole quarry (also known as Pothole quarry or Three Springs quarry) is a former limestone quarry close to Llanferres, near Mold, in Denbighshire, North Wales. The quarry is popular with rock climbers due to its rural setting, ease of access and selection of routes on good quality limestone. The average height of the quarried rock is approximately 12 metres (39 ft).

== Location ==
Pot Hole Quarry is located near the village of Llanferres, on the A494 between Mold and Ruthin, in Denbighshire, North Wales, United Kingdom.

== Climbing ==
The routes range in grade from V-Diff to E3, the emphasis of the majority of routes being on single pitch finger cracks and pockets. The hardest graded route at the quarry is Vetta Variation (E3 5c). The easiest graded route is Sunset (VD).

Although some of the easier routes on the Main Wall are now becoming polished, routes graded HVS and above are in fair condition. The crag has been popular since the late 1970s/early 1980s and is often visited on the way to or from Snowdonia, when traveling from the North West of England. The quarry, and much of the Clwyd Area, was pioneered by Stuart Cathcart. The crag remains a favourite for group usage, with school parties and military outward-bound groups both frequenting Pot Hole.

=== Prominent climbs ===
The main wall of the quarry has a few outstanding routes, the star of the crag being 'The Dog' (HVS 5a), a thin finger crack with well protected, absorbing and sustained climbing. The routes are chiefly mid-grade, with routes of VS level dominating much of the main wall, 'Tre-Fynnon' (VS 4b) and 'The Watzman' (VS 4b) being the routes most worthy of note. The Right Angle (HS 4b) is an interesting climb requiring a bridge of two faces and wide crack jamming methods; a route marred by dampness, loose rock inside the crack and awkward protection.
