= T. Glynne Davies =

Welsh writer, poet and broadcaster (1926–1988)

Thomas Glynne Davies (12 January 1926 – 10 April 1988), usually known as T. Glynne Davies, was a Welsh poet, novelist and television and radio broadcaster. Davies was born in Llanrwst, Wales.

== Career ==
Davies was crowned as a bardd in the 1951 National Eisteddfod in Llanrwst for composing the winning poem "Adfeilion" ("Ruins").

His other literary output includes the elegy Hedydd yn yr Haul ("Skylark in the sun") (1969) and the epic novel Marged (1974). The latter is a family saga, described by one critic as a "vibrant and ambitious work"

During World War II, Davies worked at a colliery in Oakdale near Caerphilly, as a Bevin Boy.

Davies worked as a news reporter for BBC Radio from 1957 and presented the popular Welsh language radio programme Bore Da ("Good morning") from 1970 to 1976.

== Legacy ==
Davies had four sons, including the composer and broadcaster Gareth Glyn and Geraint Glynne Davies who is a member of the Welsh folk group Ar Log.

In 2011, Welsh television channel S4C announced the T.Glynne Davies Scholarship for the year 2011–12.

== Published works ==
- "Cân serch a storïau eraill", 1954
- "Haf creulon: nofel" (novel), 1960
- "Llwybrau pridd" (Cerddi cyntaf), 1961
- "Hedydd yn yr haul", 1969
- "Marged", 1974
- "Gwilym Cowlyd, 1828-1904", 1976
- "Cerddi", 1987
