= Alun School =

Coordinates: 53°09′39″N 3°08′27″W

- Mold, Flintshire, Wales

Information
- School type: Community school
- Founded: 1969
- Founder: David Leadbeater
- Authority: Estyn
- Head teacher: Jane Cooper
- Grades: Year 7 - Year 13
- Enrolment: 1800
- Education system: British Curriculum
- Website: www.alunschool.co.uk

Alun School is a secondary school located in the community of Mold, Flintshire, Wales. It was formed in 1970 as a result of the merger of the Alun Grammar School and the Daniel Owen Secondary Modern School.

Some of the school's present buildings, such as the Daniel Owen Building, date from 1938. The remainder were opened on the formation of the current comprehensive or built in the years since. In 1989, 1432 students attended the school; by 2009 the number was 1762, with over 550 students in the sixth form and over 120 teachers. The main school remains over-subscribed and the Sixth Form is one of the biggest in Wales.

The school is sometimes known colloquially as Mold Alun, to distinguish it from the nearby Castell Alun secondary school in Hope.

== Buildings ==
The Alun has many distinguishable buildings and areas. These include:

- Lloyd Parry Building containing Biology rooms, Library and the Reception.
- Tower Block containing the G Floor (sixth form), L Floor (computers), M Floor (languages) and the T Floor (humanities).
- Daniel Owen Building containing the Maths and English corridors, and the Daniel Owen Hall.
- Central Block containing most of the music, art, science, drama and workshops. There is also a link between the Alun and Ysgol Maes Garmon.
- The Daniel Owen Gym and Dining block.
- Tennis courts, all-terrain pitch, extensive playing fields.
- Sports Centre (joint community use) including swimming pool, fitness suite, sports hall, gymnasium etc.

The Lloyd Parry Building, Tower Block, Daniel Owen Building, Central Block are all connected.

== Headteachers ==
Headteachers of Alun School / Alun County Secondary School / Alun Grammar School

- William Lloyd Parry (1880–1922) Founder of the School : A book titled 'The LLoyd Parry Years' is available from the school.
- Owen Hughes (1922–1941)
- Joseph Jones (1942–1958)
- Gareth Lloyd Jones (1958–1965)
- David Leadbeater (1965–1967)

Headteachers of Daniel Owen Secondary Modern School / Central School

- Harold Shaw (1939–1940)
- Ceriog Williams (1940–1967)

Headteachers of Alun School (became comprehensive in 1967 and moved to present site in November 1973)

- David Leadbeater (1967–1972)
- Ray (Gerry) German (1972–1974) (Dismissed)
- Wynne Williams (Acting Headteacher from Easter 1974 - Summer 1975)
- James Hanson (1975–1991)
- David Williams (1991–1997)
- Paul Mulraney (1997–2008)
- Ashley Jones (2008–2014)
- Jane Cooper (2014–present)

== Notable alumni ==
Notable ex-students include:

- Matt Barbet - Sky News presenter
- Jonny Buckland - musician, Coldplay
- Nick Fenton - retired footballer, a former player for Manchester City; now a physiotherapist with Burton Albion
- Emma Jones - journalist
- Andy Nicholls - former football hooligan, football manager, and author
- Ken Skates - Labour Party politician, Member of the Senedd and Cabinet Secretary for Economy and Infrastructure in the Welsh Government.
- Dave Snowden - lecturer, consultant, researcher
