= Ysgol Maes Garmon =

Location
- Stryd Conwy; Mold, Flintshire, CH7 1JB; Wales; 53.162°N 3.141°W

Information
- Type: Community secondary school
- Motto: Welsh: Ni Lwyddir Heb Lafur (There is no success without labour)
- Established: 1961
- Local authority: Flintshire County Council
- Department for Education URN: 401705 Tables
- Head teacher: Bronwen Hughes
- Teaching staff: 35.1 (on an FTE basis)
- Gender: Mixed
- Age range: 11–18
- Enrolment: 571 (2022)
- Student to teacher ratio: 14.3
- Language: Welsh
- Website: www.ysgolmaesgarmon.com

Ysgol Maes Garmon is an 11–18 mixed, Welsh-medium community secondary school and sixth form in Mold, Flintshire, Wales. It was established in 1961 and is the only Welsh-medium High school in Flintshire.

It shares some of its facilities with Alun School.

Although Ysgol Maes Garmon is a Welsh-medium school, it welcomes pupils who cannot yet speak the Welsh language, running an immersion programme to help students from English-medium primary schools to learn Welsh. The school has been active in supporting Welsh-medium education. In 2016 a documentary, OMG: Ysgol Ni!, was filmed at the school by S4C.

As of 2021, the school's most recent inspection by Estyn was in December 2019, with judgements of Adequate and needs improvement for Standards, for Teaching and learning experiences and for Leadership and management; and Good for Wellbeing and attitudes to learning and for Care, support and guidance.

== Notable alumni ==
- Gareth Glyn, composer and radio broadcaster
- Rhys Ifans, actor and musician
- Nia Jones, athlete
- Rhodri Meilir, actor
- Nic Parry, commentator and presenter
- Rob Roberts, disgraced member of Parliament
- Connor Marc Colquhoun, Streamer and YouTuber
