= Llanarmon-yn-Iâl =

Village in Denbighshire, Wales

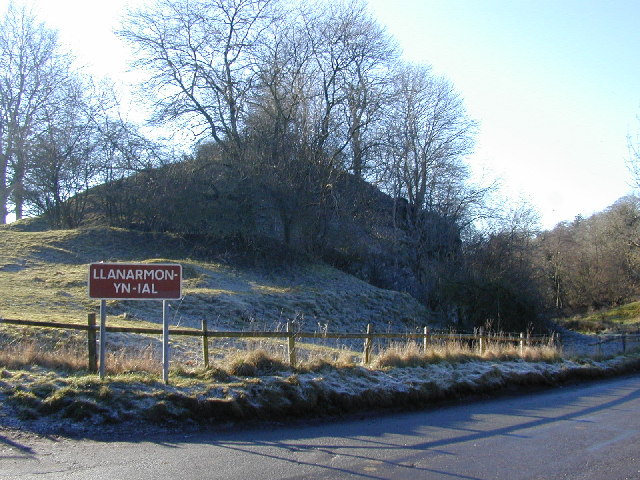
- The motte of Tomen-y-Faerdre, located outside the village

- Location within Denbighshire
- Population: 1,062 (2011 Census, includes Eryrys and Graianrhyd)
- OS grid reference: SJ189561
- Community: Llanarmon-yn-Iâl
- Principal area: Denbighshire
- Preserved county: Clwyd
- Country: Wales
- Sovereign state: United Kingdom
- Post town: MOLD
- Postcode district: CH7
- Dialling code: 01824
- Police: North Wales
- Fire: North Wales
- Ambulance: Welsh
- UK Parliament: Clwyd West
- Senedd Cymru – Welsh Parliament: Clwyd West
- List of places UK Wales Denbighshire 53.096°N 3.211°W Map of the community

Llanarmon-yn-Iâl is a village, and local government community, in Denbighshire, Wales, lying in limestone country in the valley of the River Alyn.

The community is part of an electoral ward called Llanarmon-yn-Iâl/Llandegla. The population of this ward at the 2011 census was 2,456, the community population being 1062.

== Location ==
The village sits on the B5431 road, near the junction with the B5430, six miles south of the market town of Mold, at approximate Ordnance Survey map grid reference SJ190562.

The boundaries of Llanarmon-yn-Iâl community include, as well as the main village, the villages of Eryrys and Graianrhyd, along with a number of small hamlets and large areas of farmland. The community lies mostly within the boundaries of the Clwydian Range and Dee Valley Area of Outstanding Natural Beauty.

== History ==
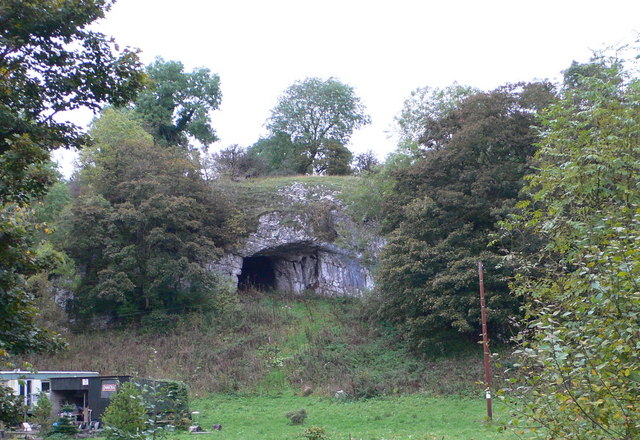
Cave at Llanarmon-yn-Ial

The village, considered the capital of the commote of Yale grew up around a religious community dedicated to a Roman Bishop named St. Germanus of Auxerre (St. Garmon in the Welsh language). Pilgrims travelling to St Garmon's shrine, which contained an image of the saint reputed to have miraculous properties, probably financed the construction of the impressive church of St. Garmon, dating from the 13th century.

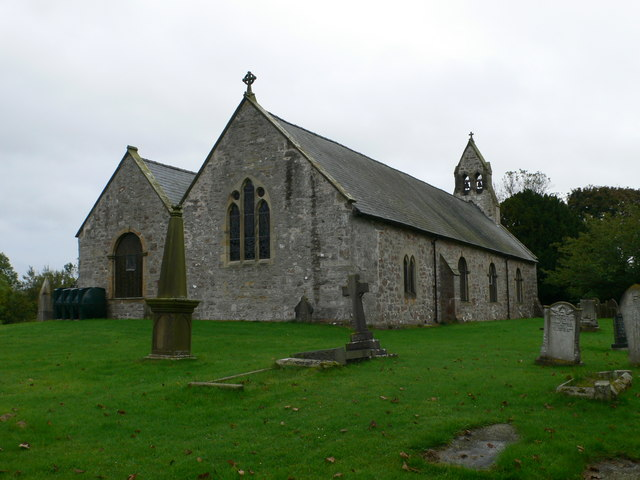
St Garmon's church

Near to the village, the Lords of Yale had constructed an earth-and-timber motte and bailey castle, Tomen-y-faerdre, during the 11th century, which seems to have acted as an administrative centre. King John of England rebuilt the castle in 1212 for his campaign against Prince Llywelyn ap Iorwerth. Just to the east of the village, close to the river, is a cave containing signs of Neolithic human habitation.

Llanarmon was located on several drovers' roads and owed much of its prosperity to the cattle which passed through on their way from Anglesey to the markets of England. In the 19th century it was one of the few places in north Wales where wheat was grown, through heavy treatment of the fields with lime, which also helped to create lush pasture for the drovers' cattle. The local limestone quarries provided employment after the droving trade died out towards the end of the 19th century.

It was the birthplace of the Welsh folklorist and poet Robert Bryan (1858–1920) and of the hymn-writer J. R. Jones ('Alltud Glyn Maelor'; 1800–81).

== Amenities ==
In the centre of the village can be found a small, traditional village shop and the Raven Inn public house, the last of the many drovers' inns that were once found in the village. Both shop and pub are "community run" by villagers. Llanarmon is 2 miles from the A494, a main north–south trunk route, and 3 miles from the A525 and the A5104 roads.

The village is approximately 1.5 miles east of the Offa's Dyke National Trail. The picturesque nature of the village, and the natural beauty of its surroundings, combined with proximity to major routes, make it a popular destination for walkers and other outdoor pursuits enthusiasts.

The village is served by bus services 2 Mold–Ruthin (GM Buses) and the T8 Corwen–Chester (TrawsCymru) at school times only, GM Buses also run the fflecsi bus service between the villages and the main towns of Mold and Ruthin.
