= Ogof Nadolig =

Cave in Flintshire, Wales

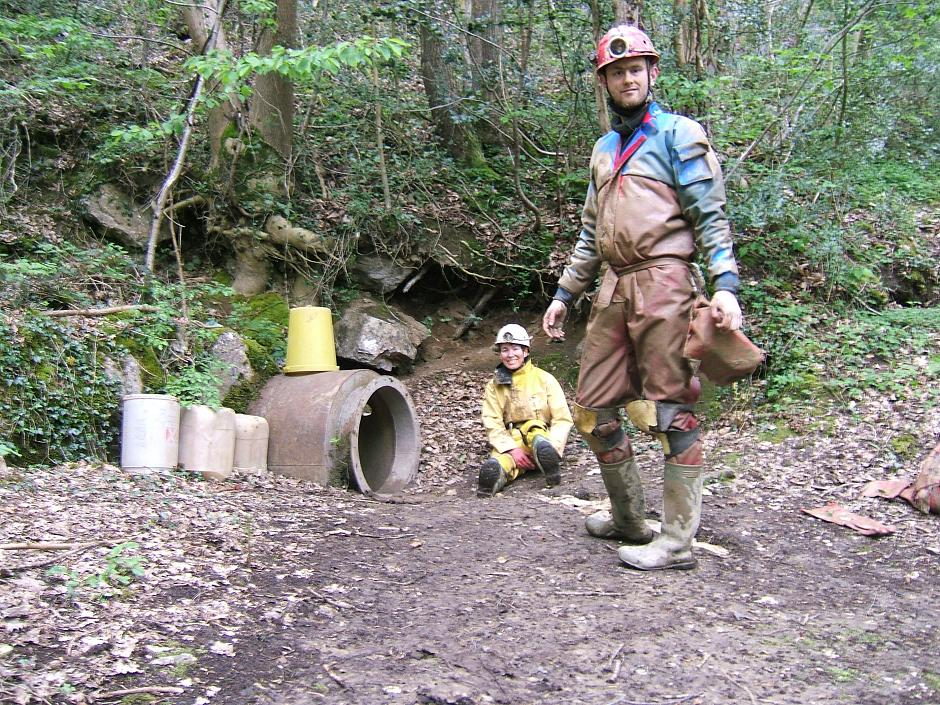
- Lower entrance structure

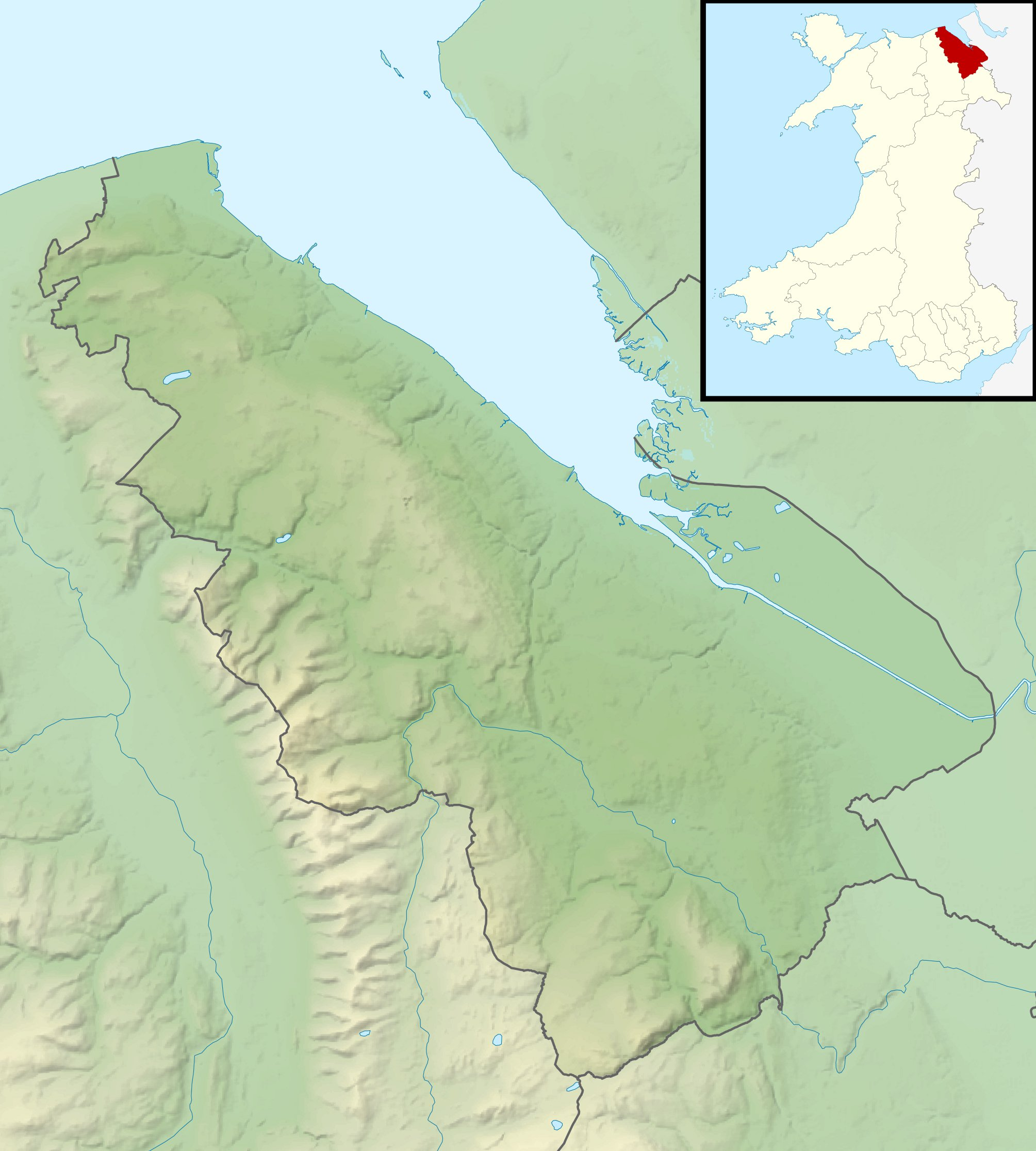
- Location within Flintshire
- Location: Alyn Gorge, Flintshire, Wales
- OS grid: SJ 19036555
- Coordinates: 53°10′51″N 3°12′47″W
- Length: 300 metres (980 ft)
- Discovery: North Wales Caving Club 1978
- Geology: Limestone
- Hazards: None
- Access: Free
- Translation: Christmas Cave (Welsh)
- Cave survey: elevation
- Registry: Cambrian Cave Registry

Ogof Nadolig is a cave in the Alyn Gorge near Cilcain, Flintshire, Wales. It is mostly crawling, 300 metres (980 ft) long, and ends with a shaft up to the surface and a locked manhole cover.

Nearby, but closer to the river, are the caves Ogof Hesp Alyn and Ogof Hen Ffynhonnau.

Its name derives from the fact that it was discovered on Christmas Day.
