= South Wales Mountaineering Club =

The South Wales Mountaineering Club (SWMC) was established in 1960 and aims to encourage interest in mountaineering in all its forms, and to bring together like-minded people interested in mountaineering. The club's activities range from mountaineering and rock climbing to scrambling and hillwalking, catering for all level of experience including total beginners.

With approximately 150 members, the club covers much of the South Wales area, mostly concentrated in Cardiff and Swansea.

The club has regular weekly climbing meets and local crags and organises a number of trips to climbing areas throughout Britain and occasionally further afield. There are also a number of specialist introductory meets organised for those with little or no experience.

Adult membership is open to anyone aged 18 or over and the club also has a Junior Section for ages 7 to 17.

The SWMC is affiliated to the British Mountaineering Council (BMC) and co-hosted the BMCs AGM in 2010. It is also responsible for the publication of the current Gower & South East Wales climbing guidebook (ISBN 978-1871890945) and running a supporting wiki.

In 2005, Haydn Griffiths, a member of the club, taught explorer Sir Ranulph Fiennes how to rock climb as part of his preparation for a charity ascent of Mount Everest.
