= River Alyn =

River in north Wales

River Alyn Afon Alun (Welsh)
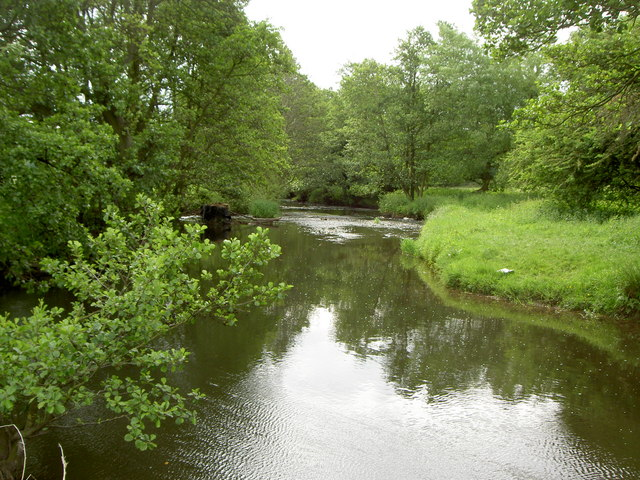
- The River Alyn near the town of Hope.

- Course of the River Alyn (light blue) and the River Dee (dark blue)
- Native name: Afon Alun (Welsh)

Location
- Country: United Kingdom
- Constituent country: Wales
- Principal areas: Denbighshire, Flintshire and Wrexham

Physical characteristics
- Source
  - location: Llandegla Moors, Flintshire
  - coordinates: 53°02′13″N 3°12′48″W
- Mouth
  - location: confluence with River Dee
  - coordinates: 53°05′54″N 2°53′58″W
- Discharge
  - location: Pont-y-Capel
  - average: 2.41 m^{3}/s (85 cu ft/s)
  - maximum: 58.93 m^{3}/s (2,081 cu ft/s)0030hrs on 7 November 2000
- Discharge
  - location: Rhydymwyn
  - average: 0.62 m^{3}/s (22 cu ft/s)

Basin features
- Tributaries
  - right: Terrig, Cegidog

The River Alyn (Welsh: Afon Alun) is a tributary of the River Dee in north-east Wales. It rises at the southern end of the Clwydian hills and the Alyn Valley forms part of the Clwydian Range and Dee Valley Area of Outstanding Natural Beauty. The main town on the river is Mold, the county town of Flintshire. It lends its name to the constituencies of Alyn and Deeside in the UK Parliament and the Senedd.

The River Alyn crosses the carboniferous limestone from Halkyn Mountain and north through the Loggerheads area before heading southeast, passing through Mold before reaching its confluence with the River Dee northeast of Wrexham.

Between Loggerheads and Rhydymwyn it runs through the Alyn Gorge, which is the site of the caves Ogof Hesp Alyn, Ogof Hen Ffynhonnau and Ogof Nadolig. It mainly runs across a limestone surface, creating potholes and underwater caves, into which the river flows through some of the summer, when water levels have decreased significantly. For parts of this stretch the river bed is dry for most of the year.

Flows in the River Alyn are significantly affected by mining, particularly the Milwr mine drainage tunnel which diverts a sizeable amount (23 million gallons of water per day.) of the River Alyn out of its catchment and into the Dee estuary at Bagillt.
