= Ogof Hesp Alyn =

Cave in Flintshire, Wales

- Location within Flintshire
- Location: Alyn Gorge, Flintshire, Wales
- OS grid: SJ 19506570
- Coordinates: 53°10′56″N 3°12′21″W
- Depth: 98 metres (322 ft)
- Length: 1,372 metres (4,501 ft)
- Discovery: North Wales Caving Club 1973
- Geology: Limestone
- Hazards: liable to flooding
- Access: contact North Wales Caving Club
- Cave survey: plan elevation
- Registry: Cambrian Cave Registry

Ogof Hesp Alyn (Welsh for: Dry Alyn Cave) was discovered by North Wales Caving Club in 1973 in the Alyn Gorge near Cilcain, Flintshire, Wales. Reaching the end of the cave is a serious commitment involving 24 pitches and the draining of two sumps. The proliferation of short, awkward and muddy pitches appear best suited to be tackled by wire ladders, but in the 1980s a team of divers from the Wessex Caving Club who passed the sumps, concluded that single rope technique was preferable, avoiding the need for excessive numbers of people to carry the equipment. A perpetual siphon has since been used at the first sump which does a good job of keeping the water level relatively low, when working properly.

A BCRA grade 5b survey of the cave exists that was created by North Wales Caving Club in two phases, in periods during the original 70s exploration, and further exploration beyond the sumps in the 80s.

As well as the main passage that meanders through the cave there are several interesting detours including the Northeast Chambers, the Mousetrap series and the Wormway, which gets its name from the numerous worms that live in the sediment.

Much of the cave is wet and muddy, with the entrance series setting the theme for what is to come later on.

With more recent discoveries, the length of cave passage totals 2 kilometres (1.2 mi) extending over a vertical range of about 90 metres (300 ft). The entrance would have functioned as a rising prior to the lowering of local water levels by mine drainage. As drainage only took place in the early 20th century, Ogof Hesp Alyn provides a valuable opportunity to study a cave system developed almost entirely by a phreatic processes which remains largely unmodified by vadose streams.

Despite the drainage that now occurs down to the Milwr Tunnel which is several hundred feet below, during periods of intense wet weather the cave can fill completely with water. This is quite rare but any visitor should take care. When the water level recedes, the 'Sand Crawl' can still remain a sump for weeks later.

It lies close to another cave, Ogof Hen Ffynhonnau, which lies about 150 metres (160 yd) further upstream in the Alyn Gorge. These two caves with Ogof Nadolig form the caves part of the Alyn Valley Woods and Alyn Gorge Caves SSSI.
