= Graianrhyd =

Village in Denbighshire, Wales

Coordinates: 53.096°N 3.170°W

Graianrhyd: Welsh: Graeanrhyd
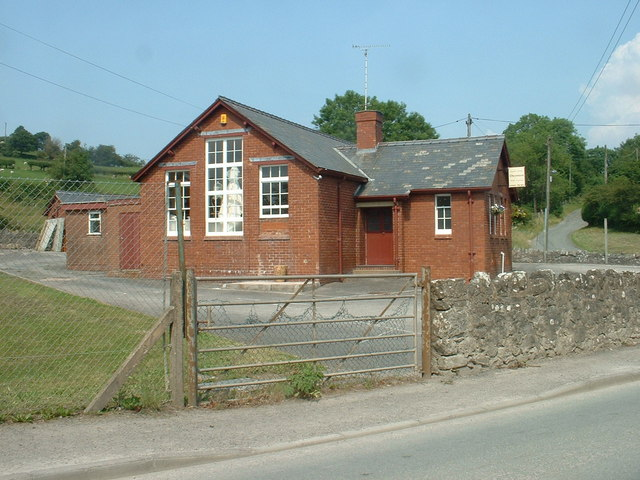
- The former Graianrhyd village school, closed in 2002

- Location within Denbighshire
- OS grid reference: SJ216562
- Community: Llanarmon-yn-Iâl
- Principal area: Denbighshire
- Preserved county: Clwyd
- Country: Wales
- Sovereign state: United Kingdom
- Post town: Mold
- Postcode district: CH7
- Dialling code: 01824
- Police: North Wales
- Fire: North Wales
- Ambulance: Welsh
- UK Parliament: Clwyd East
- Senedd Cymru – Welsh Parliament: Clwyd West

Graianrhyd, also spelt Graeanrhyd, is a small, scattered village in the community of Llanarmon-yn-Iâl, Denbighshire, Wales. It lies in hilly limestone country around 2 miles (3.2 km) to the east of Llanarmon-yn-Iâl village, and just to the south of Eryrys.

The name is likely derived from the Welsh graean, "gravel", and rhyd, "ford"; there is still a ford across the River Terrig on a minor road east of the village. There are several limestone and silicate quarries in the immediate area, which is on the borders of the Clwydian Range and Dee Valley Area of Outstanding Natural Beauty; the Clwydian Way footpath runs nearby. The area is predominantly agricultural with a landscape of woods and pastureland.

There was no church in the village, though there was a nonconformist (Congregationalist) chapel, built in 1843 and rebuilt in 1859 in a simple vernacular style. In 1905 it was recorded as having a congregation of 192. The chapel is now closed. The former Graianrhyd primary school ceased to operate in 2002, after its intake for the year fell to only 3 pupils. The village has a pub, the Rose & Crown.
