= Loggerheads, Denbighshire =

Village in Denbighshire, Wales

Coordinates: 53°09′10″N 03°12′11″W

Loggerheads
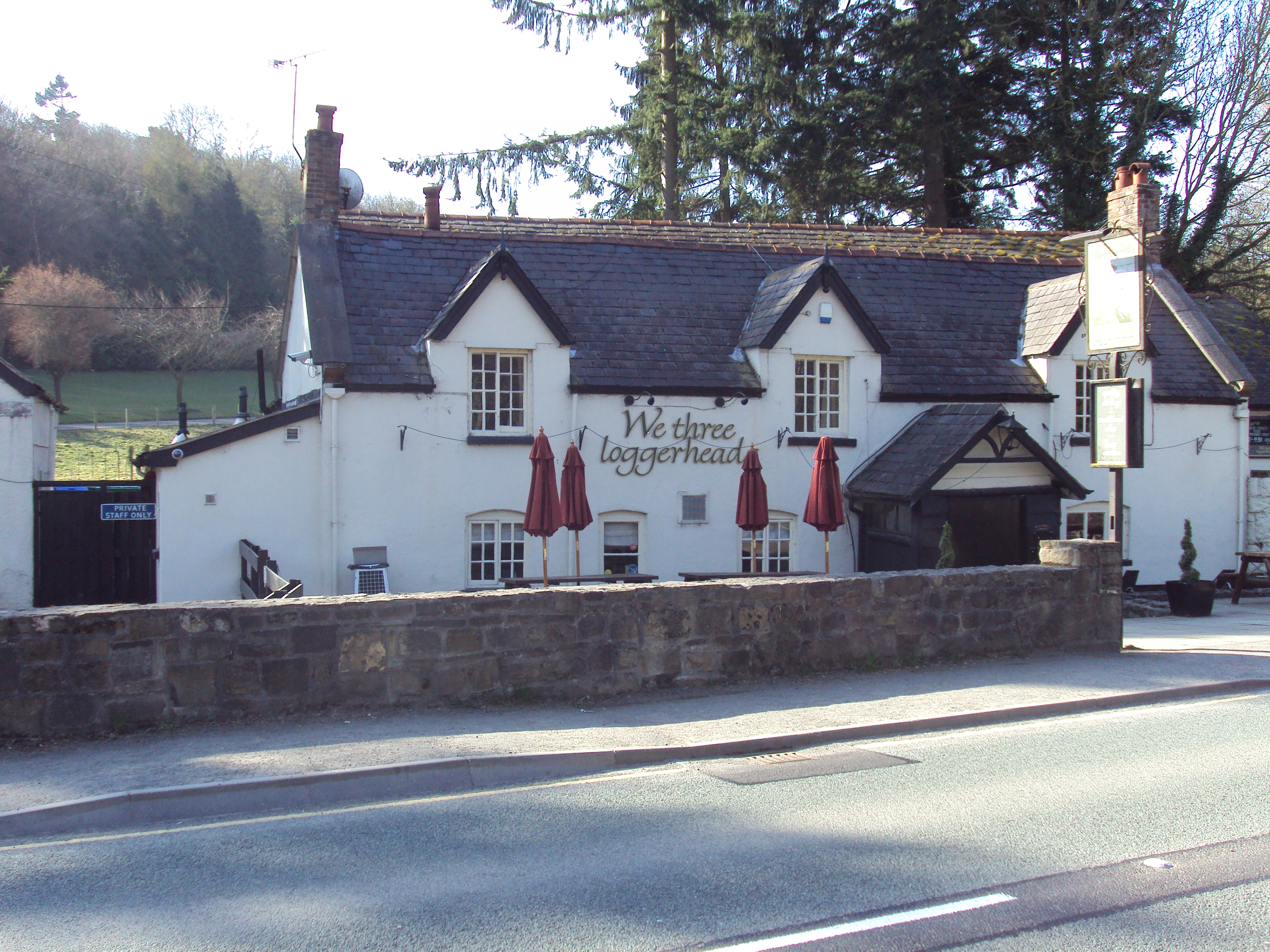
- We Three Loggerheads

- Location within Denbighshire
- Population: (2001)
- OS grid reference: SJ189626
- Community: Llanferres
- Principal area: Denbighshire
- Preserved county: Clwyd
- Country: Wales
- Sovereign state: United Kingdom
- Post town: MOLD
- Postcode district: CH7
- Dialling code: 01352
- Police: North Wales
- Fire: North Wales
- Ambulance: Welsh
- UK Parliament: Clwyd East
- Senedd Cymru – Welsh Parliament: Vale of Clwyd

Loggerheads is a village in Denbighshire, Wales on the River Alyn, a tributary of the River Dee.

It is the location of Loggerheads Country Park which follows the course of the River Alyn through karstic limestone countryside including the sites of old lead mines and mills. There is a working flour mill on site.

A leat or leete, built around 1824, follows the side of the valley nearby and was used to carry water to the lead mines of Mold Mines, on land owned by the Grosvenor family. It is now the popular Leete Walk. The name Loggerheads may come from the dispute over estate boundaries between the lordships of Mold and Llanferres. The final boundary is marked by Carreg Carn March Arthur which is said to bear the imprint of Arthur's horse's hoof after it jumped from the nearby mountain, Moel Famau. The local pub has a sign showing two men grimacing at each other with the words We Three Loggerheads, taken from a painting by Richard Wilson. The third loggerhead was the viewer.

== Climate ==
Climate data for Loggerheads: 210 m (689 ft) 1991–2020 normals, extremes 1960–2020
Month	Jan	Feb	Mar	Apr	May	Jun	Jul	Aug	Sep	Oct	Nov	Dec	Year
Record high °C (°F)	15.7 (60.3)	16.7 (62.1)	22.2 (72.0)	23.2 (73.8)	25.0 (77.0)	29.4 (84.9)	30.1 (86.2)	31.7 (89.1)	27.2 (81.0)	23.9 (75.0)	17.6 (63.7)	14.6 (58.3)	31.7 (89.1)
Mean daily maximum °C (°F)	6.9 (44.4)	7.4 (45.3)	9.4 (48.9)	11.7 (53.1)	15.0 (59.0)	17.2 (63.0)	19.4 (66.9)	19.2 (66.6)	16.3 (61.3)	12.6 (54.7)	9.5 (49.1)	7.1 (44.8)	12.6 (54.8)
Daily mean °C (°F)	3.8 (38.8)	4.2 (39.6)	5.9 (42.6)	7.5 (45.5)	10.3 (50.5)	12.8 (55.0)	15.0 (59.0)	14.7 (58.5)	12.1 (53.8)	9.0 (48.2)	6.4 (43.5)	3.9 (39.0)	8.8 (47.8)
Mean daily minimum °C (°F)	0.7 (33.3)	1.0 (33.8)	2.3 (36.1)	3.2 (37.8)	5.6 (42.1)	8.4 (47.1)	10.5 (50.9)	10.2 (50.4)	8.0 (46.4)	5.4 (41.7)	3.3 (37.9)	0.7 (33.3)	4.9 (40.9)
Record low °C (°F)	−18.3 (−0.9)	−16.7 (1.9)	−19.4 (−2.9)	−11.0 (12.2)	−4.3 (24.3)	−2.1 (28.2)	0.7 (33.3)	1.1 (34.0)	−2.0 (28.4)	−6.2 (20.8)	−10.9 (12.4)	−18.7 (−1.7)	−19.4 (−2.9)
Average precipitation mm (inches)	77.3 (3.04)	66.0 (2.60)	57.5 (2.26)	70.2 (2.76)	60.2 (2.37)	66.0 (2.60)	69.6 (2.74)	78.9 (3.11)	91.0 (3.58)	112.6 (4.43)	106.9 (4.21)	98.1 (3.86)	954.3 (37.56)
Average precipitation days	13.5	13.4	11.9	13.1	10.0	11.5	10.9	11.1	12.3	15.5	16.2	15.2	154.6
Source 1: Météo Climat
Source 2: Météo Climat
