= Ogof Hen Ffynhonnau =

Cave in Flintshire, Wales

- Location within Flintshire
- Location: Alyn Gorge, Flintshire, Wales
- OS grid: SJ 191655
- Coordinates: 53°10′51″N 3°12′40″W
- Length: 800 metres (2,600 ft)
- Discovery: 1978
- Geology: Limestone
- Hazards: liable to flood
- Access: contact North Wales Caving Club
- Translation: Old Springs Cave (Welsh)
- Registry: Cambrian Cave Registry

Ogof Hen Ffynhonnau (sometimes known in English as Poacher's Cave) lies in the Alyn Gorge in Flintshire, Wales close to Ogof Hesp Alyn. It was discovered in 1978 after excavation allowed access to Dyer's Adit. Being below a dry river bed, the cave can be prone to flooding in wet weather. There is a short ladder pitch just inside the entrance, and it makes a short trip suitable for novice cavers.

== History ==
The name Poacher's Cave was coined during an acrimonious dispute between the Northern Pennine Club who were originally digging the entrance and the North Wales Caving Club who actually broke through one day while the diggers were away. Different sides of the story are available. The following account from the Northern Pennine Club provides some flavour of the dispute:

On returning from our months here and there, we were delayed in recommencing excavation by various illnesses and the like, but eventually returned to work on 14 September. We were not too pleased to find that we had been given some unsolicited help with the project by a couple or so volunteers, who had dug down our choke, entered the adit and from there the new phreatic series. Little detective work was necessary to discover the names of the poachers who claimed, of course, that our dig had been abandoned. They seem to have ignored the following announcement from their own reporter in their newsletter No. 67 which appeared in late July – 'They (the N.P.C.) are now digging above what is thought to be the old Dyer's Adit.... attempting to open a silted natural passage at which it is believed there is a draught'. In their September Newsletter they admit having taken over the dig on 16 August. They have since been censured by the Cambrian Caving Council.

Our first encounter with the poachers was potentially an extremely explosive one. To his great credit, Dave Raine (totally out of character?) made an uneasy peace. It was agreed that we should gate the cave (it IS Wales); N.W.C.C. provided the lock (key no. P.E.S.6).

Remains of the old gate are in place and the cave is no longer locked, but the name has stuck.

== Bibliography ==
- Appleton, Peter (1989). "Limestones and Caves of North Wales". In Ford, Trevor D. (ed.). Limestones and Caves of Wales. Cambridge University Press. pp. 237–8. ISBN 0-521-32438-6.
- Waltham, A C, Simms, M J, Farrant, A R, Goldie, H S (1997). Karst and Caves of Great Britain. Chapman & Hall : 2-6 Boundary Row, London SE1 8HN, UK. pp. 262–4. ISBN 0-412-78860-8.
- "Chris Cowdery Global Presence".
