= Mold, Flintshire =

Town in Flintshire, Wales

Mold: Welsh: Yr Wyddgrug
- Town and community
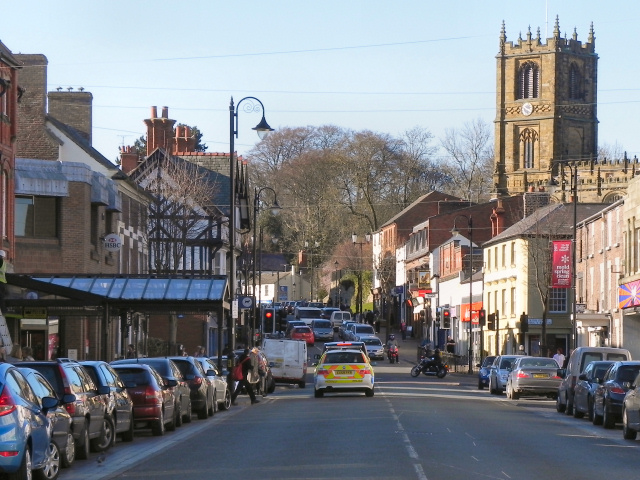
- Mold High Street, with St Mary's Church to the top-right.

- Location within Flintshire
- Population: 10,058 (2011 census)
- OS grid reference: SJ237640
- Community: Mold
- Principal area: Flintshire
- Preserved county: Clwyd
- Country: Wales
- Sovereign state: United Kingdom
- Post town: MOLD
- Postcode district: CH7
- Dialling code: 01352
- Police: North Wales
- Fire: North Wales
- Ambulance: Welsh
- UK Parliament: Clwyd East
- Senedd Cymru – Welsh Parliament: Clwyd
- Website: Town council
- List of places UK Wales Flintshire 53.166°N 3.133°W Map of the community

Mold (Welsh: Yr Wyddgrug) is a town and community in Flintshire, Wales, on the River Alyn. It is the historic county town and was the administrative seat of Flintshire County Council from 1996 to 2025, as it was of Clwyd from 1974 to 1996. According to the 2011 UK census, it had a population of 10,058. A 2019 estimate puts it at 10,123.

== Toponymy ==
The original Welsh-language place name, Yr Wyddgrug, was recorded as Gythe Gruc in a document of 1280–1281, and means "The Mound of the Tomb/Sepulchre".

The name "Mold" originates from the Norman-French mont-hault ("high hill"). The name was originally applied to the site of Mold Castle in connection with its builder Robert de Montalt, an Anglo-Norman lord. It is recorded as Mohald in a document of 1254.

== History ==
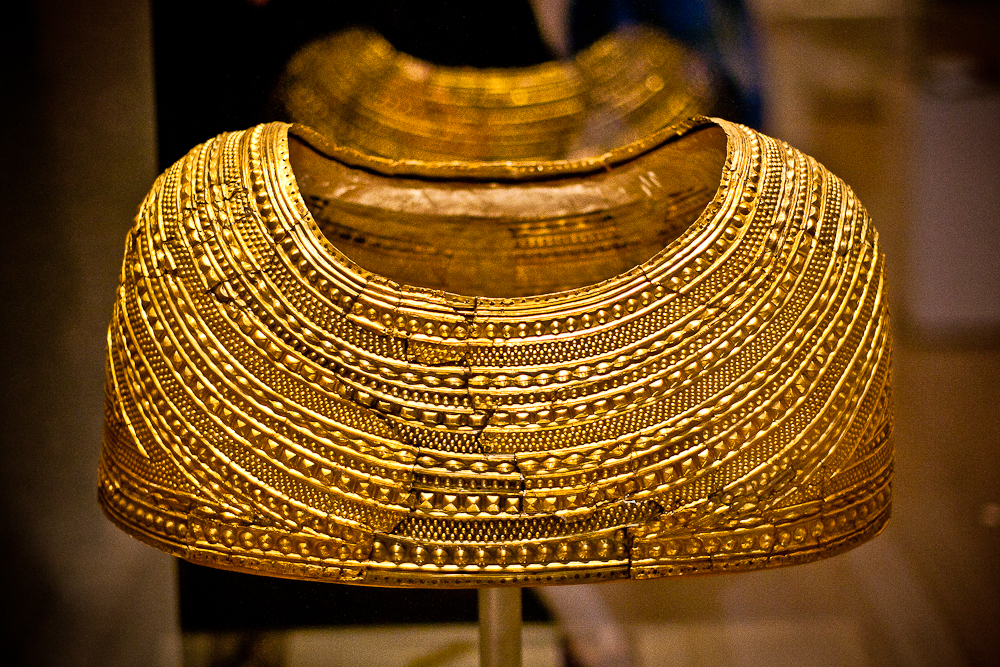
The Mold cape

A mile west of the town is Maes Garmon ("The Field of Germanus"), the traditional site of the "Alleluia Victory" by a force of Romano-Britons led by Germanus of Auxerre against the invading Picts and Scots, which occurred shortly after Easter, AD 430.

Mold developed around Mold Castle. The motte and bailey were built by the Norman Robert de Montalt in around 1140 in conjunction with the military invasion of Wales by Anglo-Norman forces. The castle was besieged numerous times by the Princes of Gwynedd as they fought to retake control of the eastern cantrefi in the Perfeddwlad (English: Middle Country). In 1146, Owain Gwynedd captured the castle. By 1167, Henry II was in possession of the castle, although it was recaptured by the Welsh forces of Llywelyn the Great in 1201.

Anglo-Norman authority over the area began again in 1241 when Dafydd ap Llywelyn yielded possession of the castle to the de Montalt family. However, he recaptured it from the Plantagenet nobility in 1245. The next few decades were a period of peace; Llywelyn ap Gruffudd built the Welsh native castle of Ewloe further to the east, re-establishing Gwynedd's military control over the area. Under Welsh rule, Mold Castle was deemed to be a "royal stronghold". It was recaptured by the forces of Edward I during the first months of the war of 1276–77. Mold Castle was still a substantial fortification at the outbreak of the rebellion by Madog ap Llywelyn in 1294. However, with the death of the last Lord Montalt in 1329, the castle's importance began to decline. The last mention of the fortification is in Patent Rolls from the early 15th century.

With the end of the Welsh Wars, English common law was introduced by the Statute of Rhuddlan. This led to an increase in commercial enterprise in the township which had been laid out around Mold Castle. Trade soon began between the Welsh community and English merchants in Chester and Whitchurch, Shropshire. During the medieval period, the town held two annual fairs and a weekly market, which brought in substantial revenues, as drovers brought their livestock to the English-Welsh border to be sold.

Nevertheless, tensions between the Welsh and the English remained. During the War of the Roses, Reinalt ab Gruffydd ab Bleddyn, a Lancastrian captain who defended Harlech Castle for Henry VI against Yorkist forces, was constantly engaged in feuds with Chester. In 1465 a large number of armed men from Chester arrived at the Mold fair looking for trouble. A fight broke out which led to a pitched battle; eventually Reinalt triumphed and captured Robert Bryne, a former Mayor of Chester. The Welsh captain then took Bryne back to his tower house near Mold and hanged him. In retaliation, up to 200 men-at-arms were sent from Chester to seize Reinalt. However, the Welshman used his military experience to turn the tables on his attackers. He hid in the woods while many of the men entered his home; once they were inside, he rushed from concealment, blocked the door, and set fire to the building, trapping those inside. Reinalt then attacked the remainder, driving them back towards Chester.

By the late 15th century, the lordships around Mold had passed to the powerful Stanley family. In 1477 records mention that Thomas Stanley, 1st Earl of Derby had appointed numerous civic officials in Mold (including a mayor), was operating several mills, and had established a courthouse in the town.

=== 16th century onwards ===
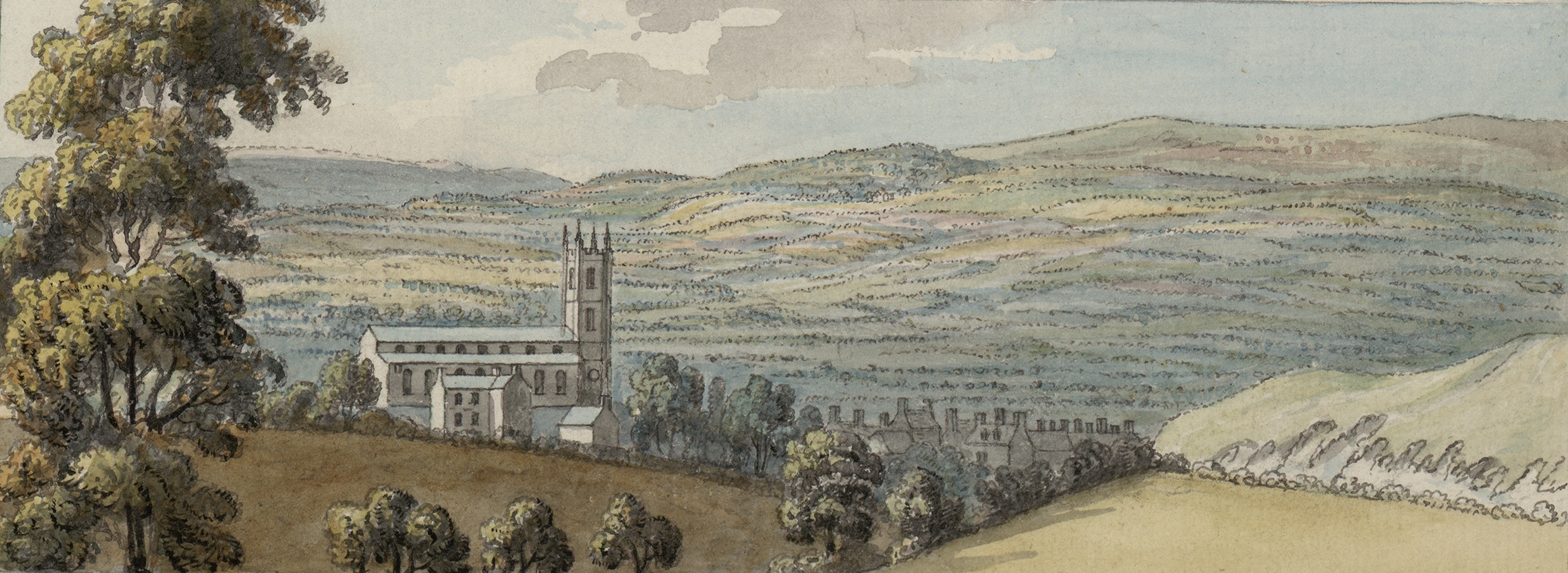
A view of Mold c.1778

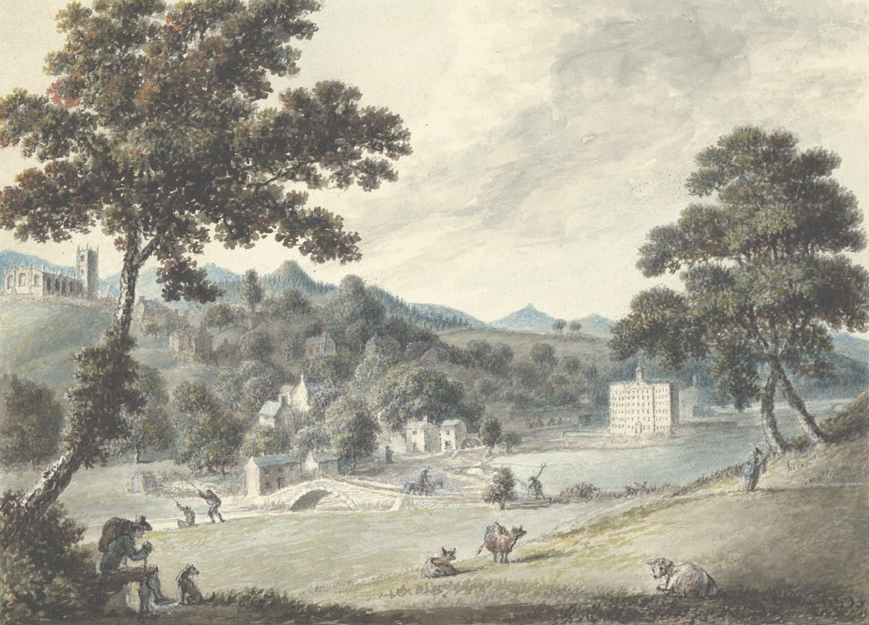
Mold, c.1795

In the 1530s, the Tudor antiquarian John Leland noted the weekly market had been abandoned. By now Mold had two main streets, Streate Byle (Beili) and Streate Dadlede (Dadleu-dy), and about 40 houses making up the settlement. By the beginning of the 17th century, the population was rising with the development of the coal industry near the town. By the 1630s there were more than 120 houses and huts in the area.

The government of Elizabeth I had established royal representatives (justices of the peace, sheriffs, and lords lieutenant) in every county of Wales. Mold developed into the administrative centre for Flintshire. By the 1760s, the Quarter Sessions were based in the town; the county hall was established in 1833, and the county gaol in 1871.

In 1833, workmen digging a Bronze Age mound at Bryn yr Ellyllon (Fairies' or Goblins' Hill) found a unique golden cape dating from 1900 to 1600 BCE. It weighs 560 grams (20 oz) or 18 troy ounces, and was made from a single gold ingot about the size of a golf ball. It was broken when found and the fragments shared among the workmen, with the largest piece for Mr Langford, tenant of the field in which the mound stood. The find was recorded by the Vicar of Mold and came to the notice of the British Museum. In 1836 Langford sold his piece to the museum, which has since acquired most of the pieces, though it is said that some wives of the workmen sported new jewellery after the find. The restored cape now belongs to the British Museum.

Mold hosted the National Eisteddfod in 1923, 1991 and 2007. There was an unofficial National Eisteddfod event in 1873.

Mold was linked to Chester by the Mold Railway, with a large British Rail station and adjacent marshalling yards and engine sheds; however, the latter closed when Croes Newydd at Wrexham was opened, as did the station in 1962 in the Beeching cuts. However, the track survived until the mid-1980s to serve the Synthite chemical works. A Tesco supermarket was built on the station site in the 1990s.

The former Black Lion pub on the High Street was tangentially involved in the Second World War's British intelligence operation known as "Operation Mincemeat".

=== The Mold Riot ===
In summer 1869 there was a riot in the town which had considerable effect on the subsequent policing of public disturbances in Britain.

On 17 May 1869, John Young, the English manager of the nearby colliery in Leeswood, angered his workers by announcing a pay cut. He had previously strained relationships with them by banning the use of the Welsh language underground. Two days later, after a meeting at the pithead, miners attacked Young before frogmarching him to the police station. Seven men were arrested and ordered to stand trial on 2 June. All were found guilty, and the convicted ringleaders, Ismael Jones and John Jones, were sentenced to a month's hard labour.

A large crowd assembled to hear the verdict. The Chief Constable of Flintshire arranged for the presence of police from all over the county and soldiers from the 4th King's Own Regiment (Lancaster), based temporarily at Chester. As the convicts were transferred to the railway station, a crowd of 1500–2000 grew restive and threw missiles at the officers, injuring many. Soldiers under their commanding officer, Captain Blake, opened fire on the crowd, killing four people. They included an innocent bystander, Margaret Younghusband, a 19-year-old domestic servant from Liverpool, who had been observing events from nearby high ground. The others killed were two colliers, Robert Hannaby and Edward Bellis, and Elizabeth Jones, who was shot in the back and died two days later.

A coroner's inquest on the first three deaths was held on 5 June. The coroner, Peter Parry, was reportedly "exceedingly old and infirm", "so deaf as to be compelled to use a 'speaking' trumpet" and partially blind. He was assisted by the deputy coroner, his brother Robert Parry. The jury's verdict, after clear direction from the coroner and retiring for only five minutes to consider the matter, was justifiable homicide. Later that afternoon, a second inquest on the death of Elizabeth Jones reached the same verdict.

The following week several men – Isaac Jones, William Griffiths, Rowland Jones, Gomer Jones and William Hughes – were tried for involvement in the riot. They were found guilty of "felonious wounding" and Lord Chief Justice Bovill sentenced all to ten years' penal servitude.

Although denying the connection, Daniel Owen, who lived in the town, featured some similar events in his first novel, Rhys Lewis, which was published in instalments in 1882–1884.

== Transport ==
Mold railway station closed to passengers in 1962. The nearest station is now Buckley, which has services to Wrexham and Bidston. Flint railway station, to which Mold has regular bus services, is not much further and has direct trains to Cardiff, London and Manchester. There are frequent daytime bus services from the bus station to Chester, Wrexham, Denbigh, Holywell, Ruthin and other places.

== Landmarks ==
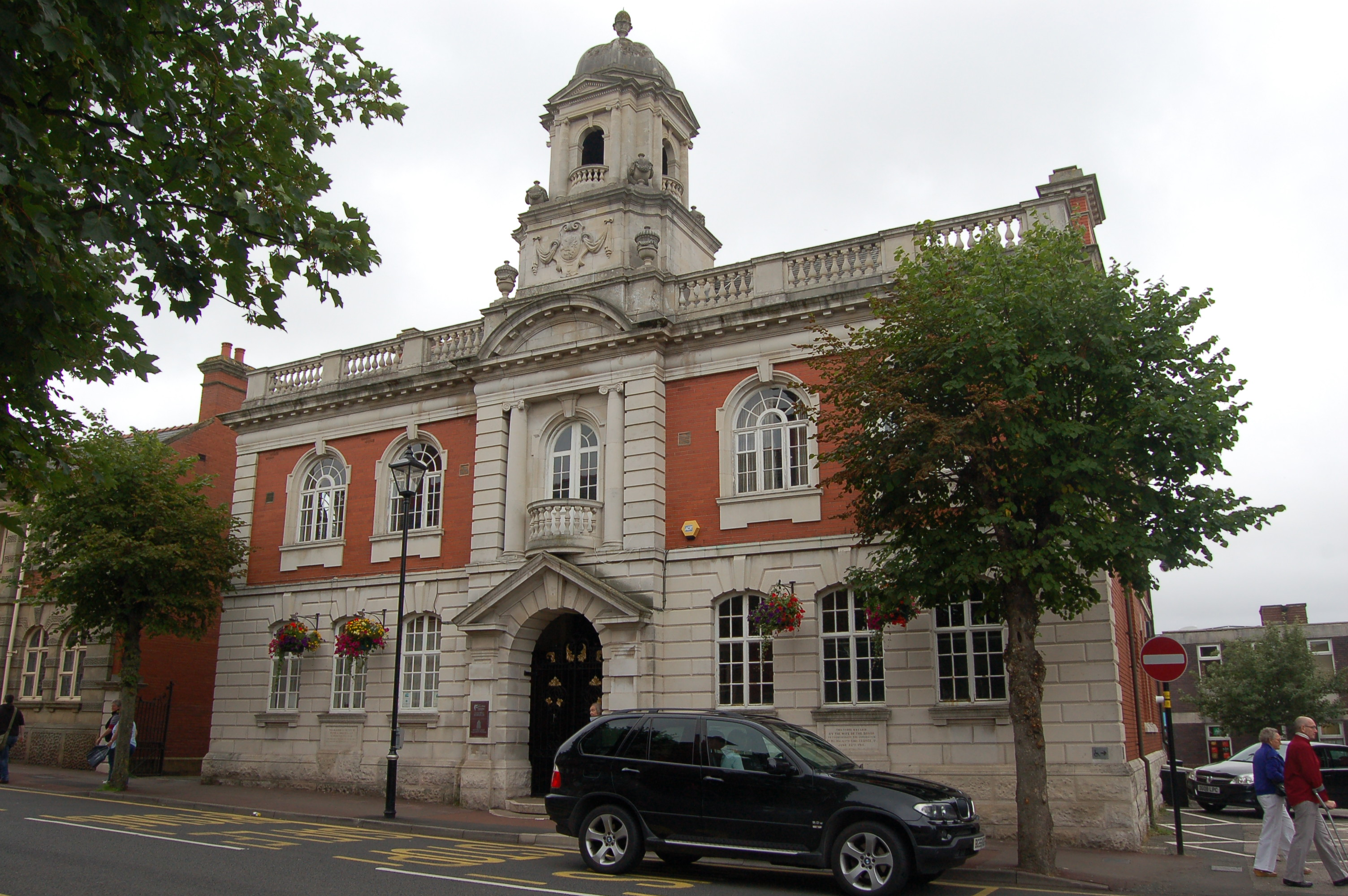
Mold Town Hall

- Mold Town Hall was completed in 1912.
- Loggerheads Country Park is nearby. (Denbighshire)
- St Mary's Church, Mold is the town's parish church, dating from the 15th century.

== Amenities ==
Mold Library shares a building with the local tourist information office, which also provides a sales outlet for local arts and crafts.

Mold is a cittaslow – the first town in Wales to achieve the distinction. It has a street market on Wednesday and Saturday for fresh produce and other goods. For speciality and fresh local food, Celyn Farmers' Market is held on the first and third Saturdays of each month.

The Mold Food and Drink Festival is held each September, with a main event area on the edge of the town centre and many central and nearby businesses contributing. 2012 saw Mold's first annual November Fest, a beer festival held at venues in and around Mold to promote real ale, cider and wine.

== Media ==
Local TV North Wales is the local based television station which broadcast to the town. Television signals are received from the Moel y Parc transmitter. With its close proximity with North West England, the town can also receive a signal from the Winter Hill TV transmitter.

Radio stations that broadcast to the town are BBC Radio Wales, BBC Radio Cymru, Capital North West and North Wales, Heart North and Mid Wales, and Calon FM, a community based station which broadcast from Wrexham.

The local newspaper is The Leader.

== Schools ==
Two secondary schools serve Mold and the surrounding villages. Alun School has about 1,800 pupils and is the largest school in the county. It is adjoined by Ysgol Maes Garmon, Flintshire's only Welsh-medium secondary school.

The town also has the largest primary school in the county, Ysgol Bryn Coch, with about 650 pupils and a second primary school Ysgol Bryn Gwalia. Ysgol Glanrafon is bilingual.

== Sport ==
The third stage of the Tour of Britain Women's cycle race started in Mold in 2026.

== Business ==
Companies based in Mold include NWN Media, publisher of The Leader.

== Climate ==
Mold has a typical British maritime climate of cool summers and mild winters. The nearest Met Office weather station for which online records are available is at Loggerheads, about three miles to the west.

The highest temperature recorded was 31.7 °C (89.1 °F) in August 1990. However, the warmest day is typically around 26.4 °C (79.5 °F), one of around four days to reach a temperature of 25.1 °C (77.2 °F) or above.

The lowest temperature recorded was −18.7 °C (−1.7 °F) in December 1981. On average the coldest night of the year is −9.7 °C (14.5 °F), with a total of 62.1 frosty nights.

Annual rainfall averages 925 mm. Almost 152 days have at least 1 mm of precipitation.

Climate data for Loggerheads 210m asl, 1971–2000, Extremes 1961–2005 (Weather Station 3 Miles West of Mold)
Month	Jan	Feb	Mar	Apr	May	Jun	Jul	Aug	Sep	Oct	Nov	Dec	Year
Record high °C (°F)	15.7 (60.3)	16.7 (62.1)	22.2 (72.0)	23.2 (73.8)	25.0 (77.0)	29.4 (84.9)	30.1 (86.2)	31.7 (89.1)	27.2 (81.0)	23.9 (75.0)	17.6 (63.7)	14.6 (58.3)	31.7 (89.1)
Mean daily maximum °C (°F)	6.3 (43.3)	6.4 (43.5)	8.5 (47.3)	10.8 (51.4)	14.4 (57.9)	16.7 (62.1)	19.0 (66.2)	18.6 (65.5)	15.8 (60.4)	12.4 (54.3)	8.8 (47.8)	7.1 (44.8)	12.1 (53.7)
Mean daily minimum °C (°F)	0.3 (32.5)	0.2 (32.4)	1.7 (35.1)	2.6 (36.7)	4.9 (40.8)	8.0 (46.4)	10.2 (50.4)	10.0 (50.0)	8.1 (46.6)	5.4 (41.7)	2.6 (36.7)	0.9 (33.6)	4.6 (40.2)
Record low °C (°F)	−18.3 (−0.9)	−16.7 (1.9)	−18.3 (−0.9)	−11.0 (12.2)	−4.3 (24.3)	−2.1 (28.2)	0.7 (33.3)	1.1 (34.0)	−2.0 (28.4)	−6.2 (20.8)	−10.9 (12.4)	−18.7 (−1.7)	−18.7 (−1.7)
Average precipitation mm (inches)	82.24 (3.24)	62.74 (2.47)	72.38 (2.85)	62.72 (2.47)	60.88 (2.40)	70.82 (2.79)	62.32 (2.45)	74.31 (2.93)	86.96 (3.42)	90.74 (3.57)	104.03 (4.10)	95.65 (3.77)	925.79 (36.46)
Source: Royal Dutch Meteorological Institute

== Notable people ==
- Jane Brereton (1685–1740), poet, born at Bryn Gruffydd near Mold
- Richard Wilson (1714–1782), landscape painter and founder member of the Royal Academy, settled in Mold in 1781
- Thomas Henry Blythe (1822–1883), emigrated to San Francisco, U.S., and became a wealthy businessman
- Daniel Owen (1836–1895), novelist writing in Welsh
- Wilfred Trubshaw (1870–1944), solicitor, police officer & Chief Constable of Lancashire Constabulary, 1927 to 1935
- Henry Gregory Thompson (1871–1942), Roman Catholic prelate, Bishop of Gibraltar, 1910 to 1927
- Tom Parry (politician) (1881-1939), politician, lawyer and soldier
- Raymond Davies Hughes (1923–1999), airman and Nazi collaborator
- Jo Stevens (born 1966), Member of Parliament, grew up in Mold
- Rhys Ifans (born 1967), actor in films, attended Ysgol Maes Garmon school
- Adam Walton (born 1971), BBC Radio Wales DJ, brought up at nearby Nannerch and attended Alun School
- Sian Gibson (born 1976), comedy actress and TV writer
- Rhodri Meilir (born 1978), actor, raised in the town and educated at Ysgol Maes Garmon school
- Rhiannon "Ritzy" Bryan (born 1985) and Rhydian Dafydd (born 1981), members of alternative rock band The Joy Formidable
- CDawgVA Connor Marc Colquhoun (born 1996), Welsh YouTuber, online streamer, voice actor and podcaster based in Japan.

=== Sport ===
- Ron Hughes (1930–2019), footballer with 399 club caps with Chester City F.C.
- Gavin Roberts (born 1984), rugby union player, with 255 caps with Caldy
- Simon Spender (born 1985), football coach and former footballer with over 400 club caps
