= Broughton railway station (Wales) =

Proposed railway station in Wales

Broughton Brychdyn
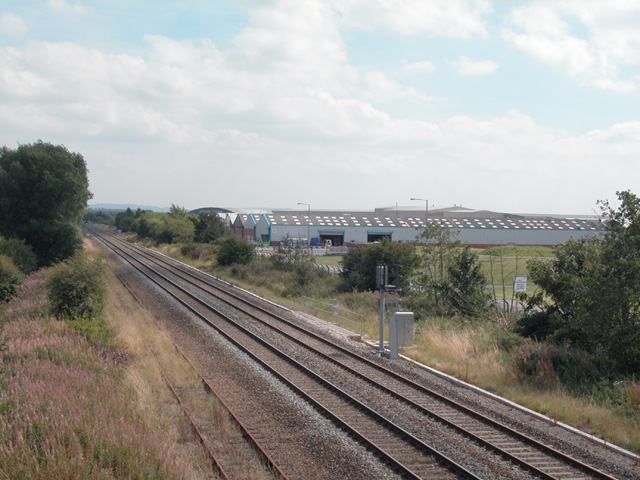
- The North Wales Coast line passing Hawarden Airport, near one of the proposed sites for Broughton.

General information
- Other names: Broughton Parkway
- Location: Flintshire; Wales
- Coordinates: 53.19011°N 2.9784°W
- System: Regional (proposed)
- Line: North Wales Coast Line

Key dates
- November 2013: First proposed
Location
- Location of the most recent proposal

Broughton railway station (Welsh: Brychdyn; also proposed as Broughton Parkway; Welsh: Parcffordd Brychdyn) is a proposed railway station on the North Wales Coast line, situated north of Broughton, Flintshire, Wales. Recent proposals for the station use a site north of Airbus UK's West factory site and Hawarden Airport, where the B5129 crosses the North Wales Coast line. Older proposals for the station include using the old sites of the former Sandycroft and Saltney Ferry railway stations.

Broughton forms part of Transport for Wales' 2029 goals for the North Wales Metro.

== History ==
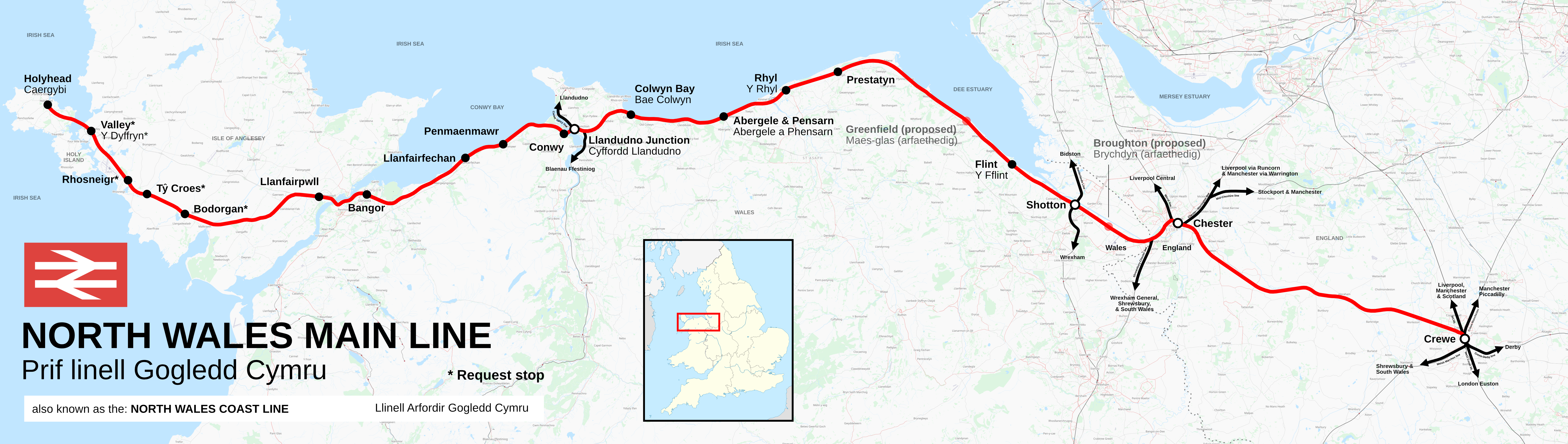
Map of the North Wales Main Line, with a "Broughton" station marked between Shotton and Chester

In November 2013, during a Westminster parliamentary debate, Mark Tami, MP for Alyn and Deeside said there was a case to be made of having railway stations at the Airbus factory in Broughton, and at Deeside industrial park.

Later in 2015, a station, provisionally named "Broughton", was included in the Welsh Government's National Transport Finance Plan 2015, published in July 2015. In which five stations were shortlisted in North Wales for consideration by the government. However, when another assessment of new stations occurred in May 2017, the station was the only one of the five in North Wales, to be dropped off the list.

As rail infrastructure is not devolved in Wales, funding for the construction of a new railway station lies with the UK Government's Department for Transport (DfT) and is delivered by Network Rail. DfT would receive advice from Network Rail on the feasibility of the station.

In 2017, Flintshire County Council's Local Development Plan for Deeside, termed "The Deeside Plan" was developed. The plan included the aspiration for a new station known as "Broughton Parkway" to be set up between Shotton Low Level and Chester railway stations, with the station serving the industries and residences of Broughton.

In 2021, the proposed station re-emerged in Transport for Wales' Metro Development Plan published in March 2021, and the Future Developments plan for the North Wales Metro published in September 2021. The accompanying maps for the latter, used to represent Transport for Wales' ambitions in the region up to 2029, include a proposed station located between Shotton and Chester railway stations, termed "Broughton". The map describes the proposals visually represented to be "Emerging priorities to 2029" for the North Wales Metro.

== Proposed location ==
There is no definitive location for the station selected by Transport for Wales as of January 2022.

As part of the local council's plan for the Mold to Broughton/Deeside Enterprise Zone Cycleway in 2018, Flintshire County Council listed three potential sites for a Broughton railway station. The three proposed sites were:

- On site of the former Sandycroft railway station, in Sandycroft, Flintshire
- New station north of Airbus UK's West Factory in Broughton
- On site of the former Saltney Ferry railway station, in Saltney, Flintshire

Visual maps, later published in September 2021, by Transport for Wales, show a proposed station fitting the central location of the proposed site north of Airbus' factory, although no confirmation of station site has been made.

Proposed sites
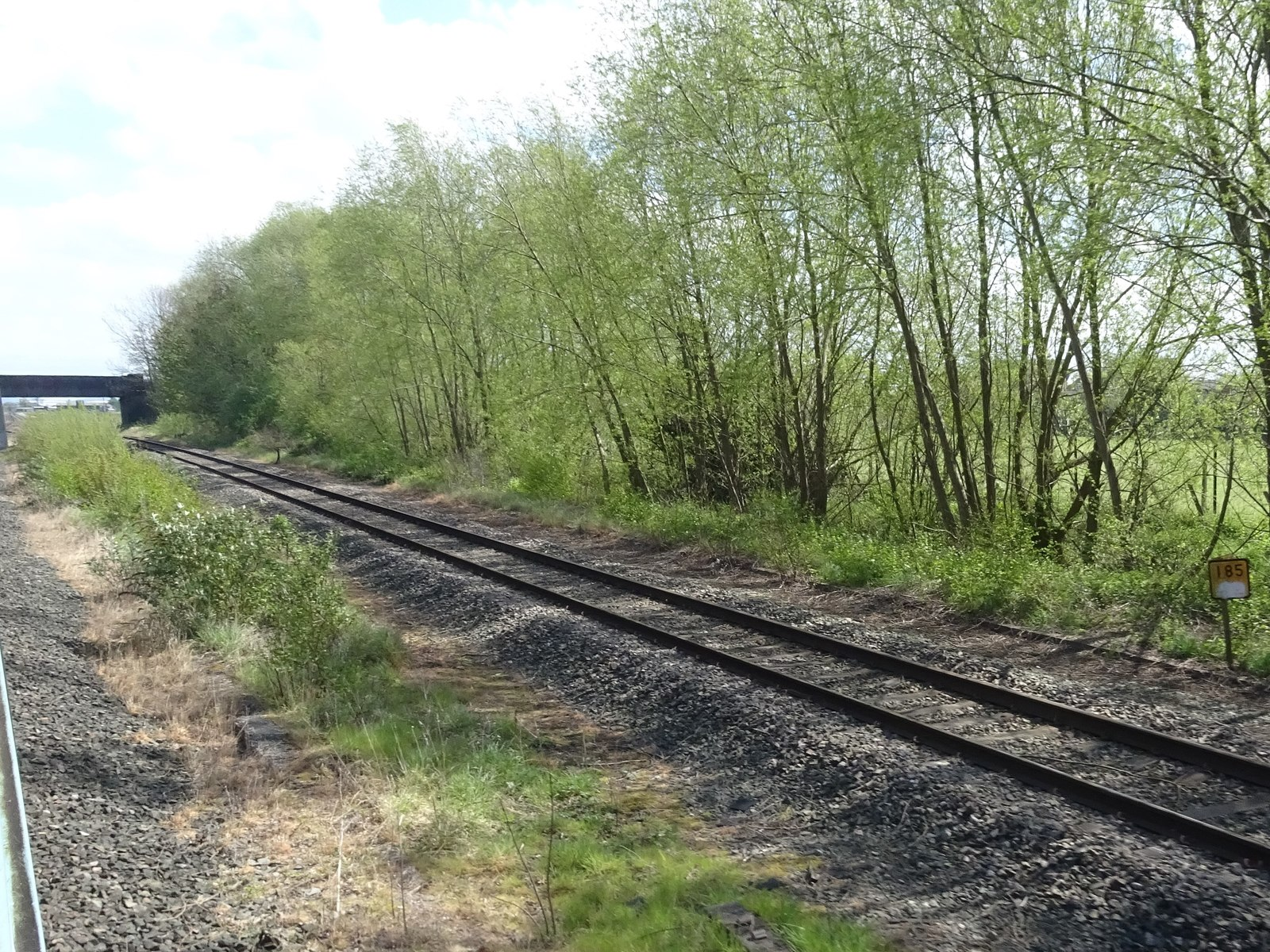
Sandycroft site

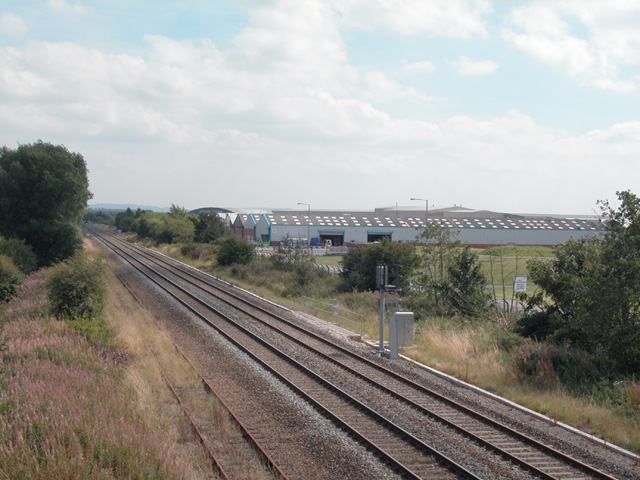
North of Airbus Factory site

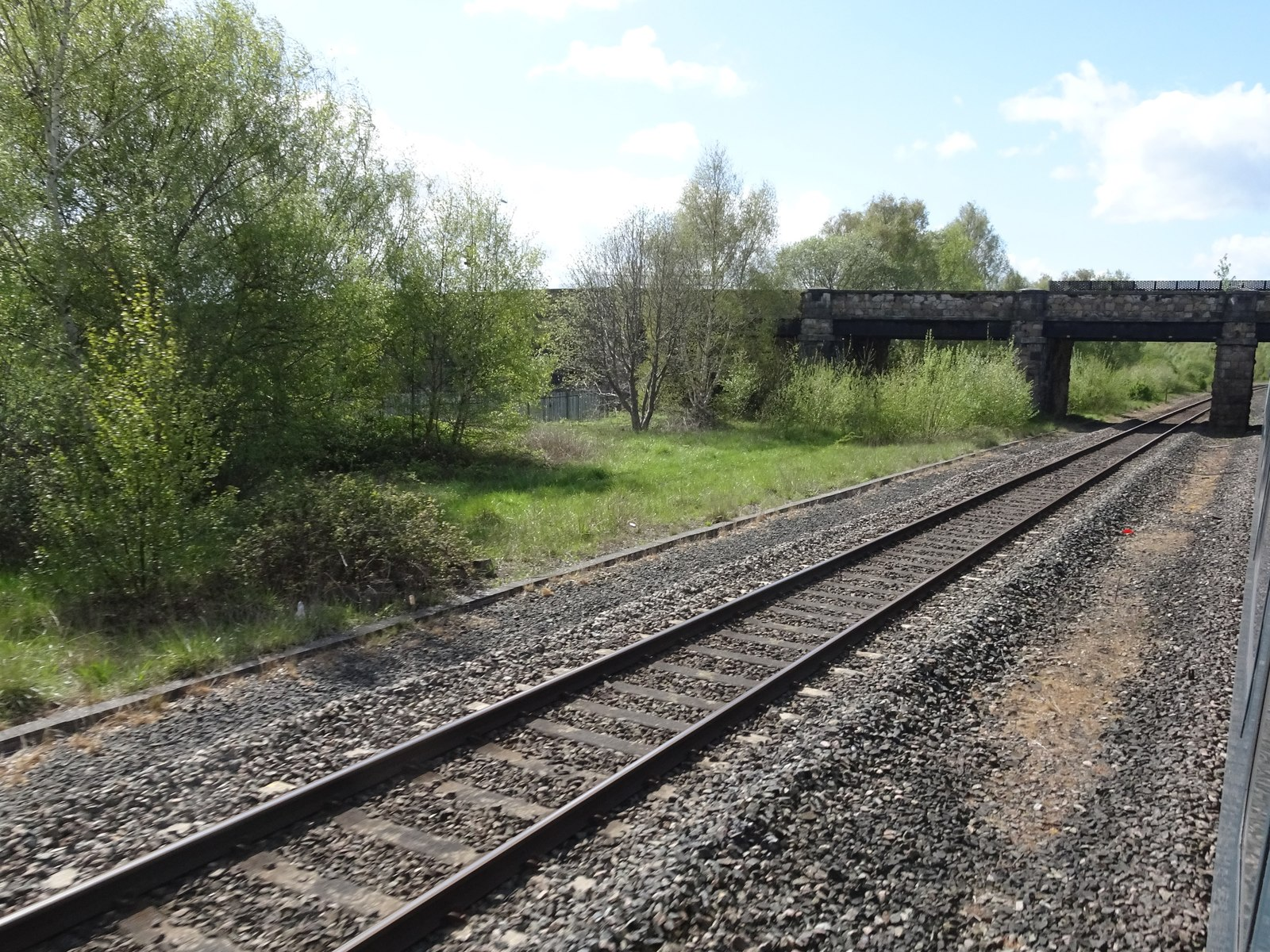
Saltney Ferry site

Preceding station	Future services	Following station
Shotton	Transport for Wales Rail North Wales Coast line	Chester
