= Broughton and Bretton =

Community in Flintshire, Wales

Broughton and Bretton: Welsh: Brychdyn a Bretton
- Community
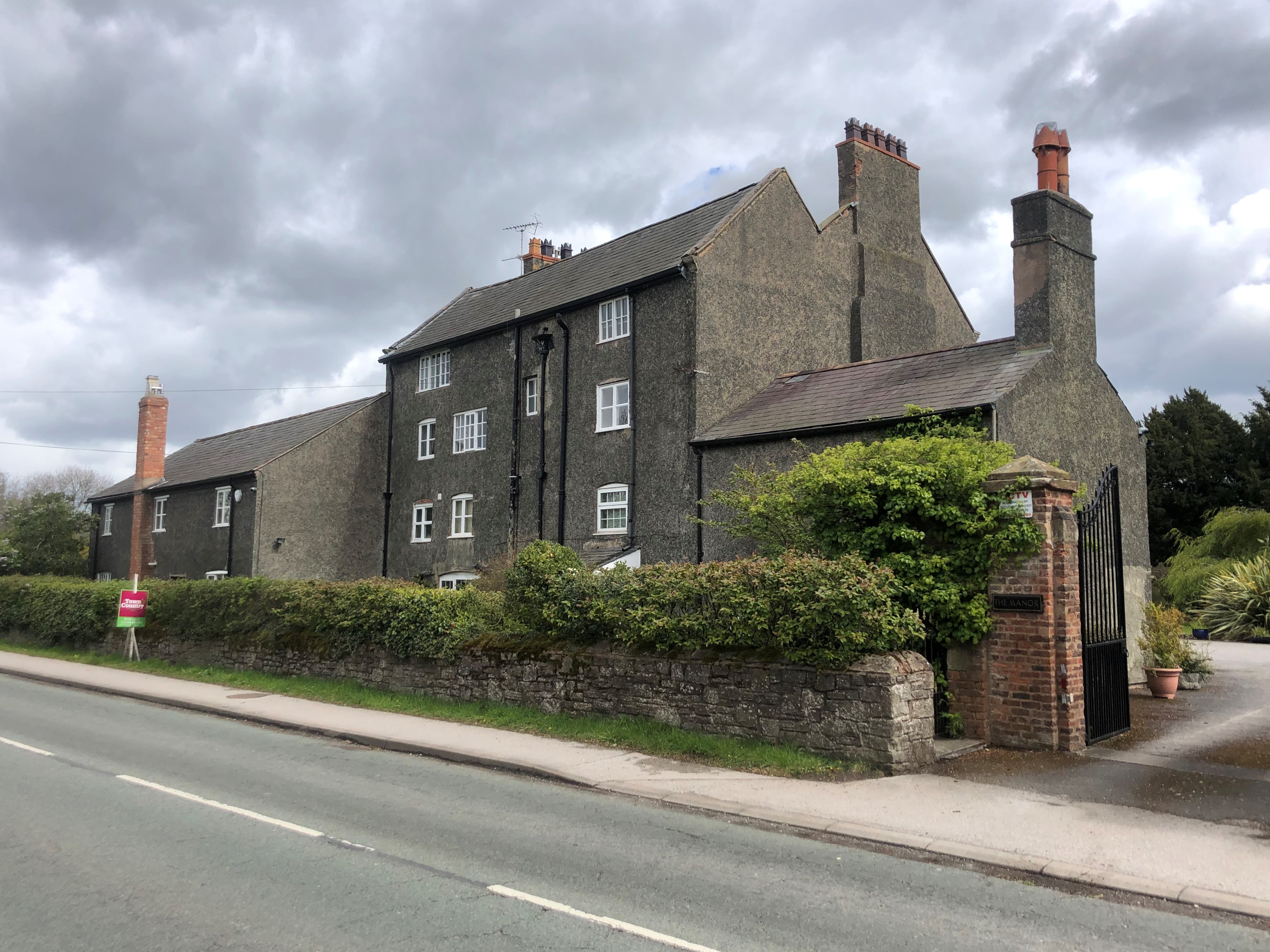
- Manor House, Broughton

- Location within Flintshire
- Population: 6,532 (2021)
- OS grid reference: SJ346643
- Principal area: Flintshire
- Preserved county: Clwyd
- Country: Wales
- Sovereign state: United Kingdom
- Settlements: Bretton, Broughton
- Post town: Chester
- Postcode district: CH4
- Post town: Deeside
- Postcode district: CH5
- Dialling code: 01244
- Police: North Wales
- Fire: North Wales
- Ambulance: Welsh
- UK Parliament: Alyn and Deeside
- Senedd Cymru – Welsh Parliament: Alyn and Deeside
- Website: Council website
- List of places UK Wales Flintshire 53.17°N 2.98°W Map of the community

Broughton and Bretton (Welsh: Brychdyn a Bretton) is a community in Flintshire, Wales. It contains the villages of Broughton and Bretton, and had a population of 5,974 as of the 2011 UK census.

The community (along with Shotton) was created in 1985 from part of the pre-existing Hawarden community. The councils have a joint arrangement, so that most of their staff carry out work for all three councils. Broughton and Bretton is divided into two wards. North East elects 5 community councillors, and South elects 9.

The community covers the same area as two Flintshire County Council electoral wards. Broughton North East elects 1 county councillor, and Broughton South elects 2.

Between 1849 and 1964 the area was served by Broughton & Bretton railway station.
