= HMAS Kara Kara =

Boom gate vessel of Royal Australian Navy

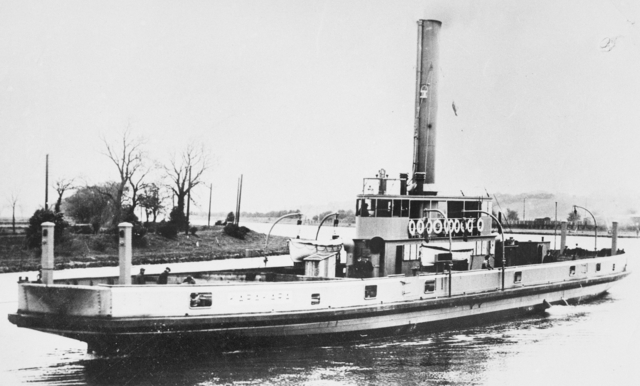
- Kara Kara in the United Kingdom in 1926

History

Australia
- Name: Kara Kara
- Owner: Sydney Ferries Limited
- Builder: J. Crichton & Company, Saltney
- Launched: 1926
- Home port: Sydney
- Fate: Requisitioned by the Royal Australian Navy in 1941

History

Australia
- Name: HMAS Kara Kara
- Commissioned: 14 September 1941
- Decommissioned: 8 December 1945
- Identification: Y276
- Fate: Sunk as target in 1973

General characteristics
- Type: Vehicle ferry
- Tonnage: 525 GRT tons
- Length: 187 feet (57 m)
- Beam: 35.6 feet (10.9 m)
- Draught: 13.1 feet (4.0 m)
- Propulsion: Triple expansion steam engines
- Speed: 13 knots (24 km/h; 15 mph)
- Armament: 1 x QF 12-pounder 12 cwt naval gun; 2 × Vickers machine guns; 2 × .30 cal machine guns

HMAS Kara Kara was a Royal Australian Navy boom gate vessel, converted from a Sydney Ferries Limited ferry.

== History ==
Kara Kara, Koondooloo and Kalang were three double ended vehicular ferries ordered by Sydney Ferries Limited for use on Sydney Harbour. Kara Kara is thought to be an Australian Aboriginal word for the Moon. The ferry was built by J. Crichton & Company, Saltney and launched in 1926. After the opening of the Sydney Harbour Bridge in 1932, Kara Kara was converted as a cargo carrier and undertook this role until 1941.

Requisitioned by the Royal Australian Navy (RAN) on 27 February 1941 and converted into a boom gate vessel and commissioned as HMAS Kara Kara on 14 September 1941. She was purchased outright on 7 November 1941 and sailed to Darwin. On the morning of the Japanese air raid on Darwin on 19 February 1942 Kara Kara was tending the western gate of the nearly complete boom. During the air raid she received one hit on an enemy aircraft, however was strafed suffering light damage and the loss of two men killed.

She was placed in reserve at Darwin on 8 December 1945. On 6 December 1950 it left to return to Sydney, arriving on 22 December 1950. Kara Kara was transferred to the un-maintained reserve at the Waverton Depot on 30 December 1960 and was later used as a depot ship for the reserve fleet at Athol Bight.

== Fate ==
Sold to Marrickville Metals, Marrickville for scrap on 15 February 1972, Kara Kara was stripped of useful material and the hulk was handed back to the RAN for use as a target. On 31 January 1973, Kara Kara was sunk forty miles off Jervis Bay by RAN A-4G Skyhawk fighter-bombers, and gunfire from HMAS Yarra, Teal and Perth.

The engine from Kara Kara is on display at the Australian National Maritime Museum at Darling Harbour.

Kara Kara was awarded the battle honour Darwin 1942–43.

== See also ==
- List of Sydney Harbour ferries
- Timeline of Sydney Harbour ferries
