= Deeside =

Urban conurbation on the England–Wales border

Coordinates: 53.2°N 3.03333°W

Deeside: Welsh: Glannau Dyfrdwy
- Cross-border conurbation
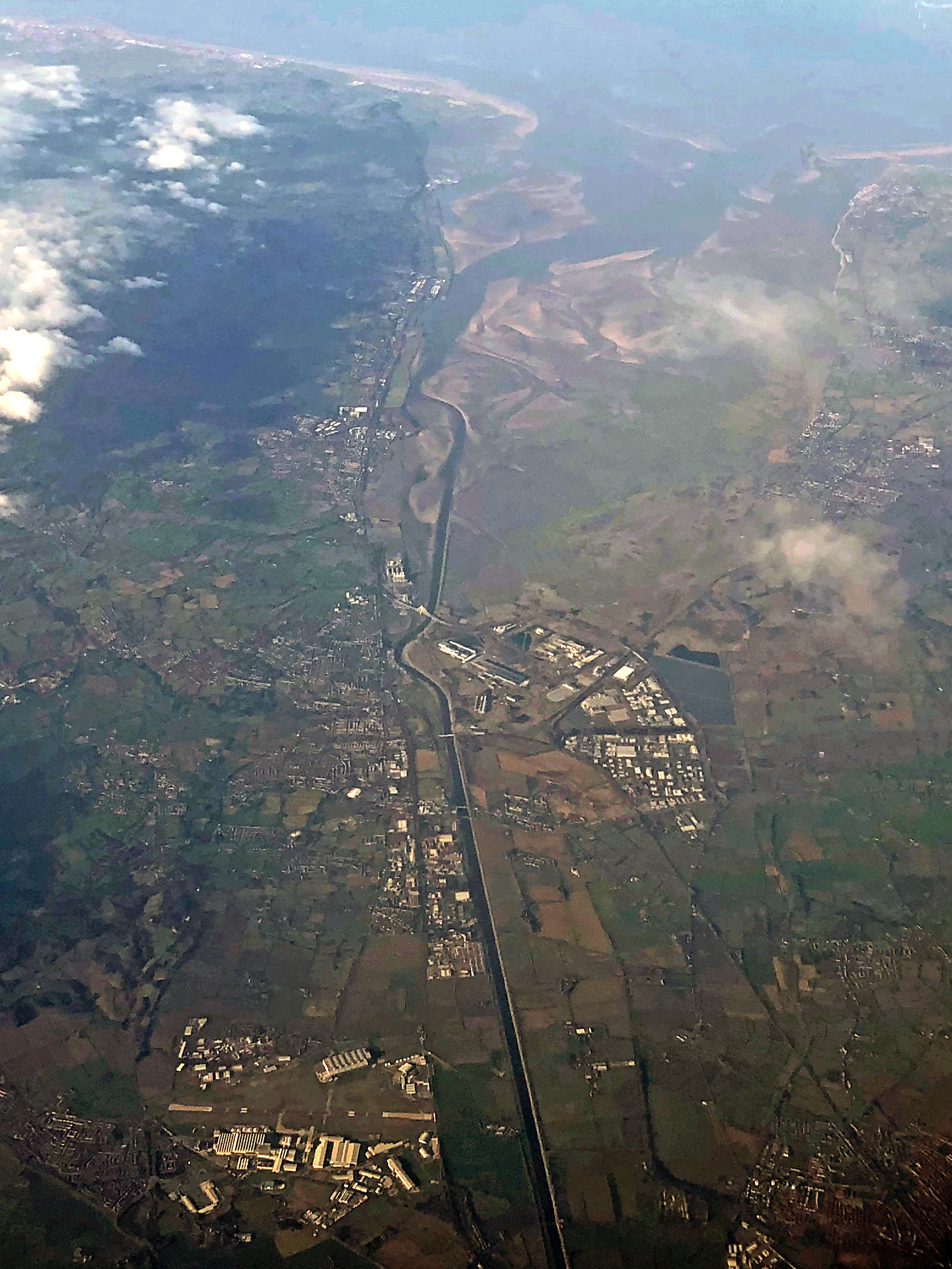
- Aerial view of Deeside and the Dee Estuary

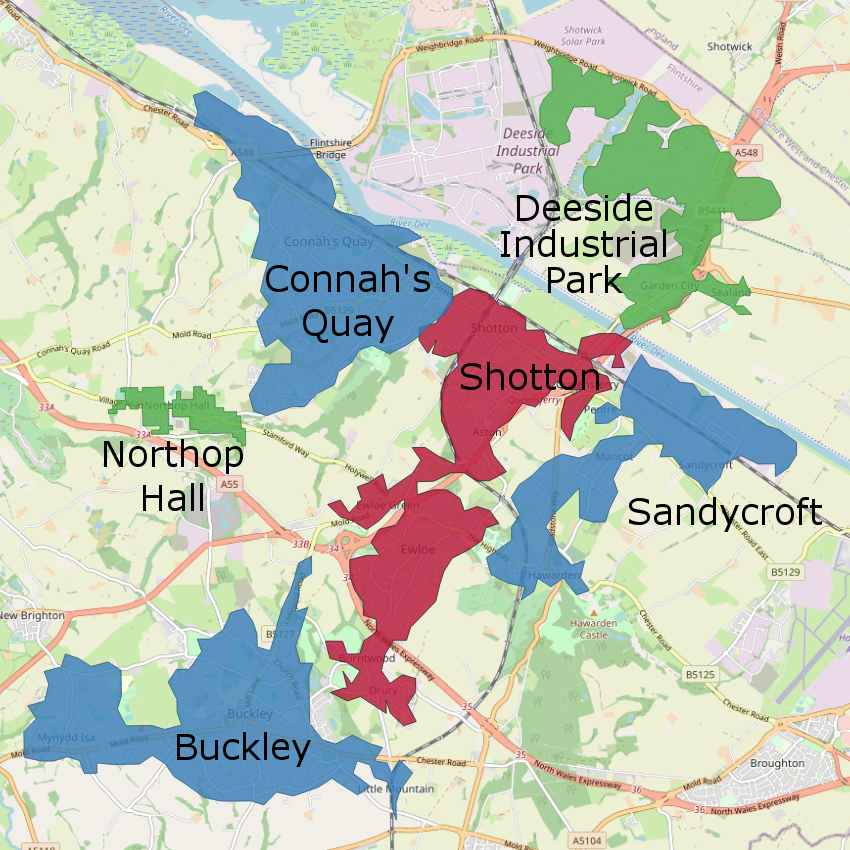
- Map of the Buckley (Note: The ONS names the BUA after Buckley, although the town itself may not be defined to be part of Deeside) Built-up Area (BUA) covering most of Deeside in Wales, with their labelled subdivisions. (Note: Not shown: Broughton (with Bretton) forms a separate BUA and Saltney is part of the Chester BUA.)

- Location within the United Kingdom
- Population: 53,568 (2011 census)
- Country: Wales & England (Note: The eastern parts of Saltney are in England.)
- Sovereign state: United Kingdom
- Post town: CHESTER/DEESIDE
- Postcode district: CH
- Dialling code: 01244
- UK Parliament: Alyn and Deeside; Chester South and Eddisbury (Note: For parts of Saltney in England only.)
- Senedd Cymru – Welsh Parliament: Fflint Wrecsam (Note: For parts of Deeside in Wales only.)

Deeside (Welsh: Glannau Dyfrdwy) is the name given to a predominantly industrial conurbation of towns and villages in Flintshire and Cheshire on the Wales–England border lying near the canalised stretch of the River Dee that flows from neighbouring Chester into the Dee Estuary. These include Connah's Quay, Shotton, Queensferry, Aston, Garden City, Sealand, Broughton, Bretton, Hawarden, Ewloe, Mancot, Pentre, Saltney (Note: Cross-border town, eastern parts are in England.) and Sandycroft. The population is around 50,000, with a plurality (17,500) living in Connah's Quay.

Deeside is known for its industry, providing jobs for the people of Cheshire, Merseyside and North Wales. The biggest employment area in Deeside is Deeside Industrial Park, located on the north bank of the Dee on the southern edge of the Wirral peninsula, which has both historical and contemporary significance, and provides Deeside and the surrounding area with jobs in many different industries from construction to food production. Deeside is also home to steel manufacturer Tata Steel and Toyota's engine manufacturing plant.

== History ==
=== Ancient history ===
Shotton's history dates back around 1000 years to Saxon times. Various settlements within the Deeside area are recorded in the Domesday book (1086) which list them within the Cheshire Hundred of Ati's Cross. They are Aston, Broughton, Clayton, Hawarden, Golftyn and Wepre. The largest of these was Hawarden with 14 households.

As a border region, the Deeside area was subject to frequent conflict between the Welsh and the English in the twelfth and thirteenth centuries. In the Battle of Ewloe in 1157, Owain Gwynedd inflicted a notable defeat on the forces of Henry II. Ewloe Castle was built by Llywelyn the Great in the early thirteenth century to secure the area. Llywelyn's son and successor, Dafydd ap Llywelyn, was born in nearby Coleshill in 1212.

=== Recent history ===
Until industrialisation in the nineteenth century, Shotton remained a cluster of hamlets: a settlement comprising Shotton, Nine Houses and Shotton Hall, which itself dates back to 1637. Coal mining developed in the eighteenth century, then in 1889 the opening of the Hawarden Railway Bridge over the River Dee improved access to the reclaimed Dee Marshes. Following this, in 1895, the Summers family purchased 40 acres (160,000 m^{2}) of Dee marshland, on which they established Shotton Steelworks.

In September 1896, Shotton Steelworks began producing sheet steel. The development of this steelworks on the banks of the River Dee changed an area that was once mainly marshland, with Shotton – just across the Dee – previously little more than a hamlet. Shotton Steelworks led to the development of whole communities to house the influx of workers, estimated up to 13,000 at the height of the industry, with Shotton and Connah's Quay Jetty hubs of activity serving the steelworks. There were also brickworks and other industries in and around Shotton, and Connah's Quay developed as a town on the banks of the Dee Estuary, becoming known for its shipbuilding industry.

== Education ==
Primary schools in the area include: Ewloe Green Primary, Well House Primary School, Bryn Deva Primary, Wepre Primary, Ysgol Cae'r Nant (Brookfield Primary), Golftyn Primary, Venerable Edward Morgan, Sealand County Primary, Sandycroft County Primary, St Ethelwold's Primary School, and most importantly, Queenferry County Primary School.

Secondary schools in the area include: Connah's Quay High Hawarden high School (Connah's Quay), Elfed School (Buckley), John Summers High School (Queensferry) which closed on 20 July 2017, and St David's High School (Saltney).

=== Further Education ===
Coleg Cambria is a large and popular college in Connah's Quay. It offers a range of full and part-time courses as well as apprenticeships. In an inspection in 2007 the college gained the highest possible grade 1 inspection ratings for its work-based learning provision. The college was formed in August 2013 through a merger between Deeside College and Yale College Wrexham; it is now one of the largest colleges in the UK and the largest in Wales.

== Transport ==
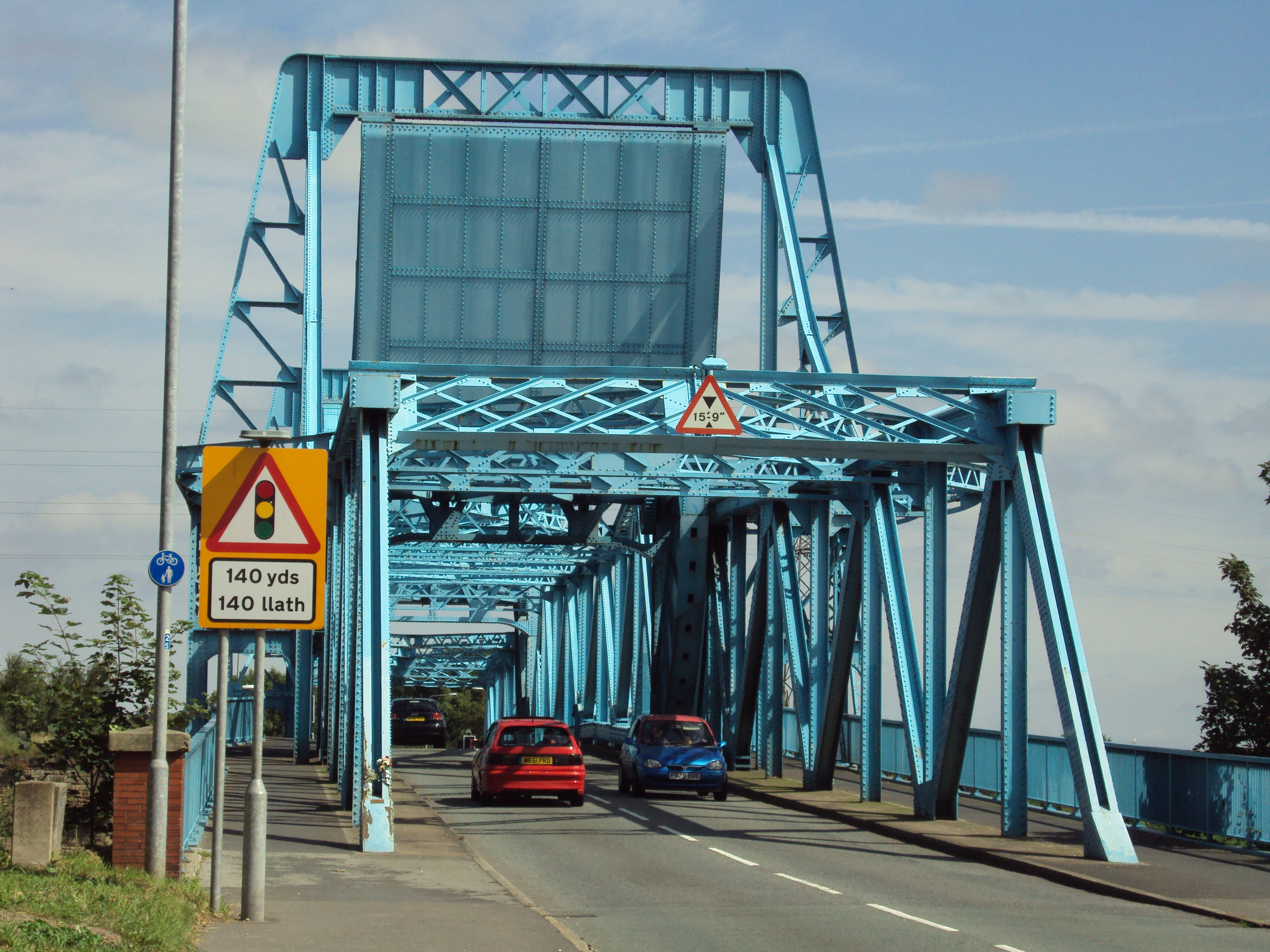
The Blue Bridge over the River Dee.

Bus travel in Deeside is mainly provided by Arriva North West who offer services to Chester Bus Exchange from a starting point in Connah's Quay, with many services part of the Chester Plus Ticket Zone of Arriva. Arriva Buses Wales also provide a service to Rhyl from Chester which passes through parts of Deeside. Senior citizens are entitled to free public transport to and from Chester.

Transport for Wales provide most train services on the two railway lines passing through Deeside, the Borderlands line between Wrexham and Bidston (Birkenhead), and the North Wales Coast Line between Crewe and Holyhead via Chester. With the main services on the lines being to Bidston, Liverpool and Manchester in England and to Wrexham, Llandudno and Holyhead in Wales. There are also services to London Euston and Cardiff Central which call at Shotton (via its low level platforms) by Avanti West Coast and Transport for Wales respectively. The other two railway stations in Deeside are: Hawarden and Hawarden Bridge both on the Borderlands line. There is a proposed Deeside station on the Borderlands line, to serve Deeside Industrial Estate and is currently in the planning stages. There are also proposals for a station near Broughton as part of the North Wales Metro.

== Landmarks ==
The most striking landmark in Deeside is the fixed cable-stayed bridge, which was opened by Queen Elizabeth II in 1998. The bridge is known as the Flintshire Bridge but is commonly referred to by locals as the "New Bridge". The industrial park has been used as the base and the service area of the Wales Rally GB every year since 2013.

=== Deeside Power Station and grid services ===
Deeside Power Station opened in 1994. It is located on Deeside Industrial Park. In 2020–21, the site was repurposed to support the UK’s National Grid. It now provides inertial response and reactive power to help enhance the Grid's resilience/stability.

Deeside's Power Station is the first gas-fired power station in the UK to be used in this way.

== Local media ==
=== Television ===
The Deeside area is covered by both the Moel-y-Parc and the Winter Hill transmitters. The area receives BBC Wales and BBC North West and ITV Wales and ITV Granada although the North West services generally do not provide news coverage of events on the Welsh side of the border.

=== Radio ===
Local radio stations include Capital North West & Wales, Chester's Dee Radio, BBC Radio Merseyside, Hits Radio Liverpool and In Demand Radio.

=== Newspapers ===
There are three main newspapers for Deeside: these are The Evening Leader, a Deeside edition of the Chester Chronicle and a Deeside edition of the Chester and District Standard.

Deeside.com is an online news and information website covering the Deeside area, it is a founder member of the Independent Community News Network (ICNN) the UK representative body for the independent community and hyperlocal news sector.

== Notable people from Deeside ==
- William Ewart Gladstone, 19th century Prime Minister of the United Kingdom lived in Hawarden (following his marriage to Catherine Glynne) from 1839 until his death in 1898.
- Ann Keen, MP for Brentford and Isleworth, born in Hawarden.
- Craig Lawton, Left winger currently playing for Cymru Alliance League side Bala Town F.C., formerly of Manchester United.
- Angus McLean, former manager of Hartlepool United F.C.
- Grenville Millington, Chester City F.C. player.
- Michael Owen, England and Liverpool F.C. footballer.
- Gary Speed, former footballer for Wales, Leeds United FC and Everton FC.
- Henry Weale, Victoria Cross recipient who fought in the First World War
