= Bretton Bridge =

Bridge in Flintshire, Wales

Coordinates: 53.1671°N 2.9791°W

Bretton Bridge is a bridge in Flintshire, Wales. Situated between the villages of Broughton and Bretton, Bretton Bridge used to be a back-road link, often used to avoid the congestion on the A5104 (Saltney Straight).

The bridge still exists today, although its use has changed from a road to a public footpath, linking the lower part of Broughton village with Broughton Park.

The bridge itself used to act as a railway bridge when the line between Broughton and Kinnerton existed. The path of the old line can clearly be seen through the country park in Broughton, where a swerve now exists following the old line of the railway. Residents in neighbouring properties (The Boulevard) found remains of railway sleepers in back gardens in the late 1980s.
