= Kalang =

Ferry on Sydney Harbour

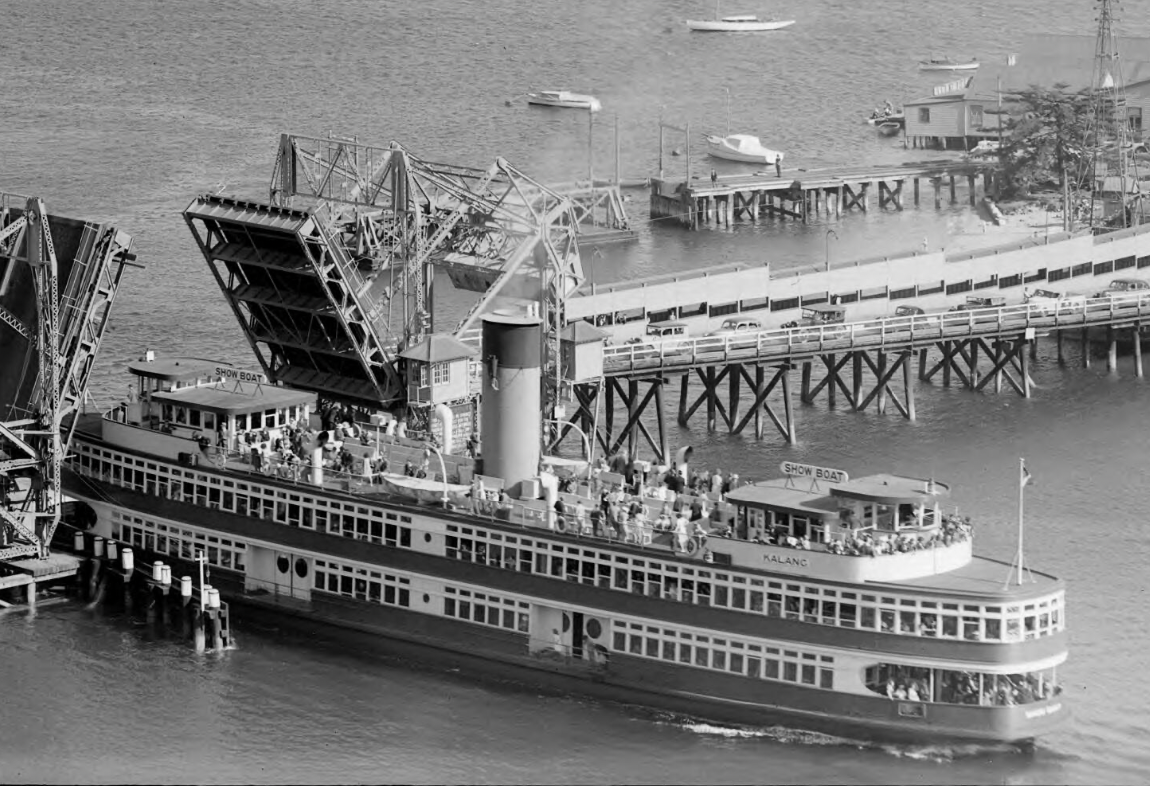
- Kalang, as showboat, passes old Spit Bridge

History
- Name: Kalang, later Sydney Queen
- Namesake: Australian Aboriginal word meaning 'beautiful'
- Operator: Sydney Ferries Limited
- Builder: J. Crichton & Company, (Saltney, England)
- Completed: 1926
- Fate: wrecked 1972

General characteristics
- Tonnage: 350 tons
- Length: 57.0 m
- Capacity: 50 vehicles, 250 passengers. Later 2,153 passengers as showboat

Kalang, later Sydney Queen, was a vehicular ferry and later show boat on Sydney Harbour. A steel-hulled, steam screw ferry, she and sister Kara Kara were the largest vehicular ferries to operate in Sydney and the largest ferries operated by Sydney Ferries Limited.

She was built in 1926 to help meet the increasing demand for vehicular traffic to cross the Harbour before the 1932 opening of the Sydney Harbour Bridge. Redundant following the opening of the bridge, she was converted to a showboat in the late 1930s. Rebuilt as an army repair ship during World War 2 she operated in Rabaul and Torokina.

Following the war, she was converted back to a showboat and became a popular Sydney icon. Following financial decline, she was laid up in the 1960s. She was wrecked on the New South Wales Mid North Coast while being towed to the Philippines.

== Design and construction ==
Kalang was built by J. Crichton & Company of Saltney, England, and was launched on 2 March 1926.

She had a length of 199 feet, and a beam of 48 feet 4 ½ inches. As built, she could carry 80 vehicles or an equivalent weight of passengers.

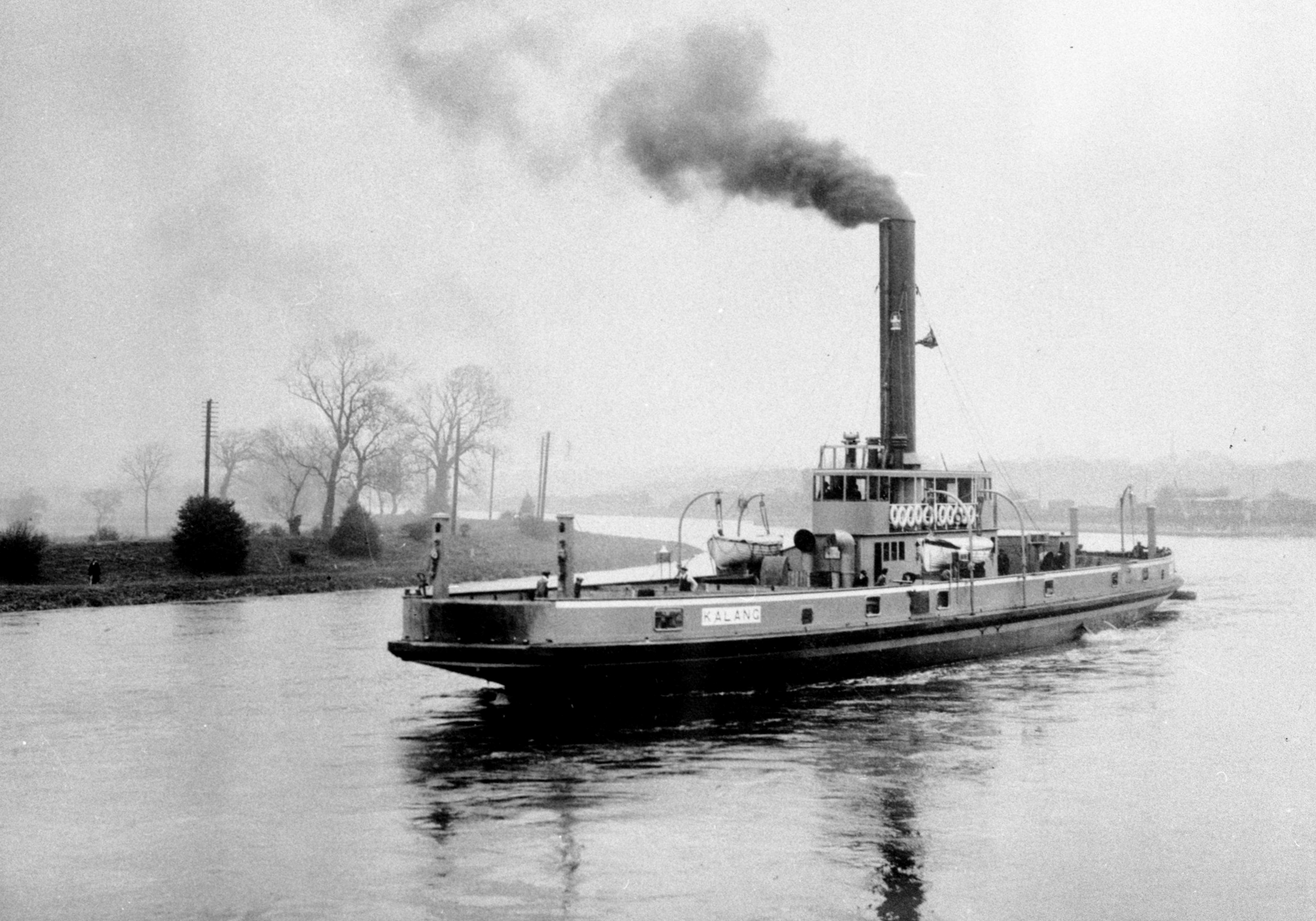
A new Kalang, in England 1926, possibly on her builder's trials, before her journey to Sydney under her own steam

Her 148 hp triple expansion, direct-acting, surface condensing steam engines were supplied by Plenty & Sons Ltd. Driving propellers at either end, her engines could push her to 13 knots. The cylinders were of 16 ½, 23, and 46 inches diameter respectively by 24 inch stroke that developed 1,000 i.h.p.

== Delivery voyage ==
Leaving Liverpool on 21 April 1926 and captained by W Manning with a crew of 16, she sailed the 12,000 miles to Sydney under own steam in ninety days. Shortly after leaving, seven stowaways were found and they were landed at Holyhead, Wales. She called at Malta on 3 and 4 May. Upon leaving Malta, she lost her anchor and collided with a lighter causing some damage to her upper works but she was able to continue. After reaching Port Said on 8 May, she passed Perim on 15 May, then Colombo, Singapore, through the Torres Strait and passed Goode Island on 22 June.

Heavy weather required her to stop into Brisbane on 4 July. She had encountered heavy weather after leaving Townsville and she was brought inside Cape Moreton to allow loose bolts to be checked and tightened. The fixings on the temporary steel plates across the vehicle platforms at either end had been broken due to the weather. 30 miles south of Point Lookout, Stradbroke Island her fore peak was found to be full of water.

She left Brisbane on the 6 July, but had to return for repairs to her bulwarks damaged in the heavy seas. She arrived in Sydney Harbour on 12 July upon which she was greeted by the sirens of passing ferries.

== Vehicular ferry (1926 - 1932) ==
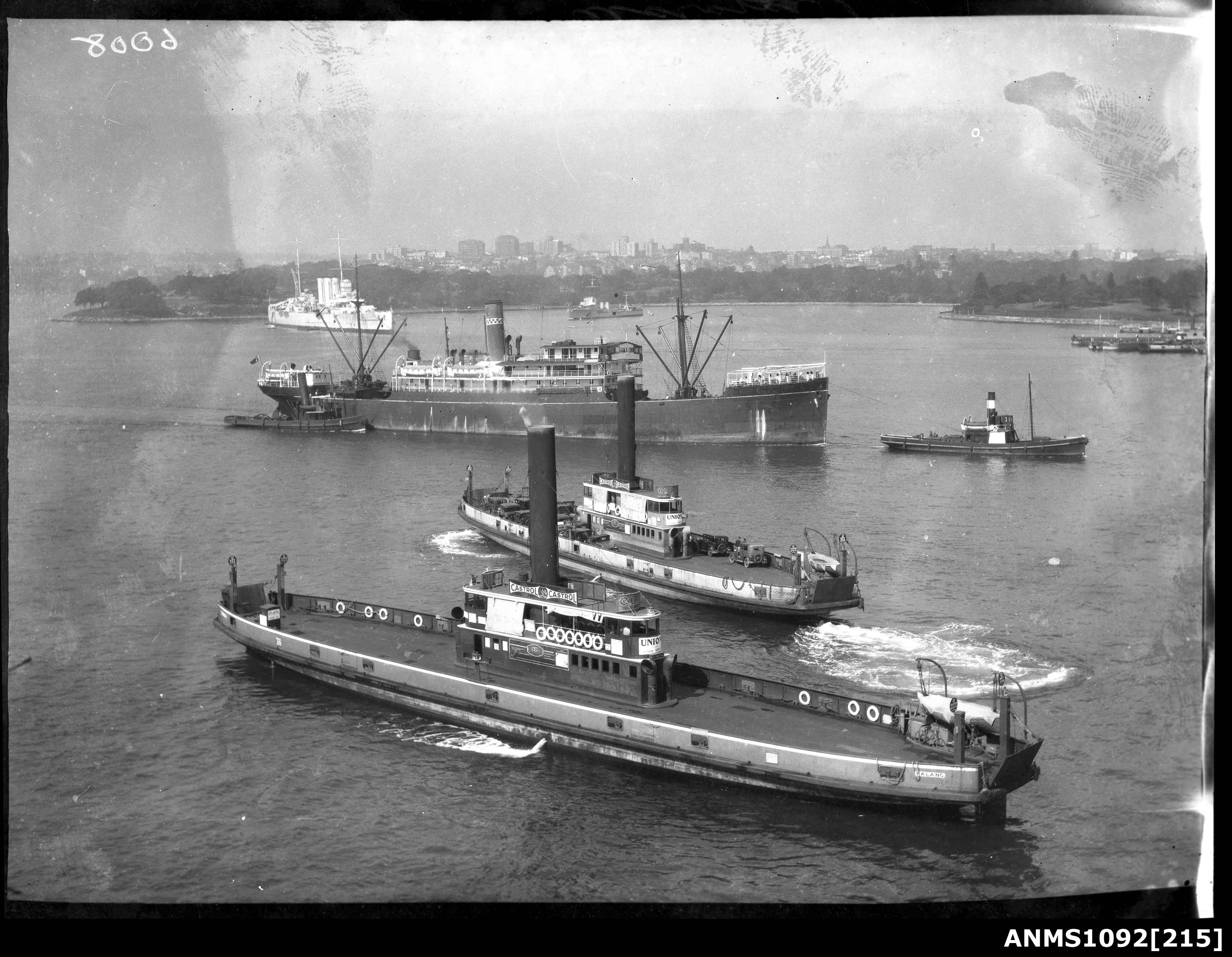
Kalang (front) and Kooroongaba near the Jeffrey Street ramps at Milsons Point

Kalang was built to serve the busy Fort Macquarie to Milsons Point vehicular ferry route prior to the 1932 opening of the Sydney Harbour Bridge. The larger vehicular ferries, such as Kalang, were used on this route while smaller vessels were used on the less busy Dawes Point to McMahons Point vehicular ferry route.

On 19 March 1932, the Sydney Harbour Bridge opened which spelled the end of both Sydney Ferries' busy Milsons Point to Circular Quay passenger run, and its vehicular ferry services. The last punt between Fort Macquarie and Milsons Point ran on the 1 April 1932. At its pre-Bridge peak, Sydney Ferries Limited had carried in excess of 40 million passengers each year. By 1933, that number had dropped to 15 million.

Fellow vehicular ferries Kooroongaba and Killara found careers elsewhere in Australia. The former was taken to Newcastle to run a service across the Hunter River to Stockton. The latter was purchased by the Westernport Ferry Service to work across Westernport Bay from Stoney Point on the Mornington Peninsula to Cowes on Phillip Island. The company had initially purchased Kedumba, but she sank near Montague Island, and the insurance money was used to purchase Killara.

Kalang, along with Kara Kara and Koondooloo were laid up. Kalang was used intermittently as cargo vessel for a few years.

== Showboat (1938 - 1942) ==
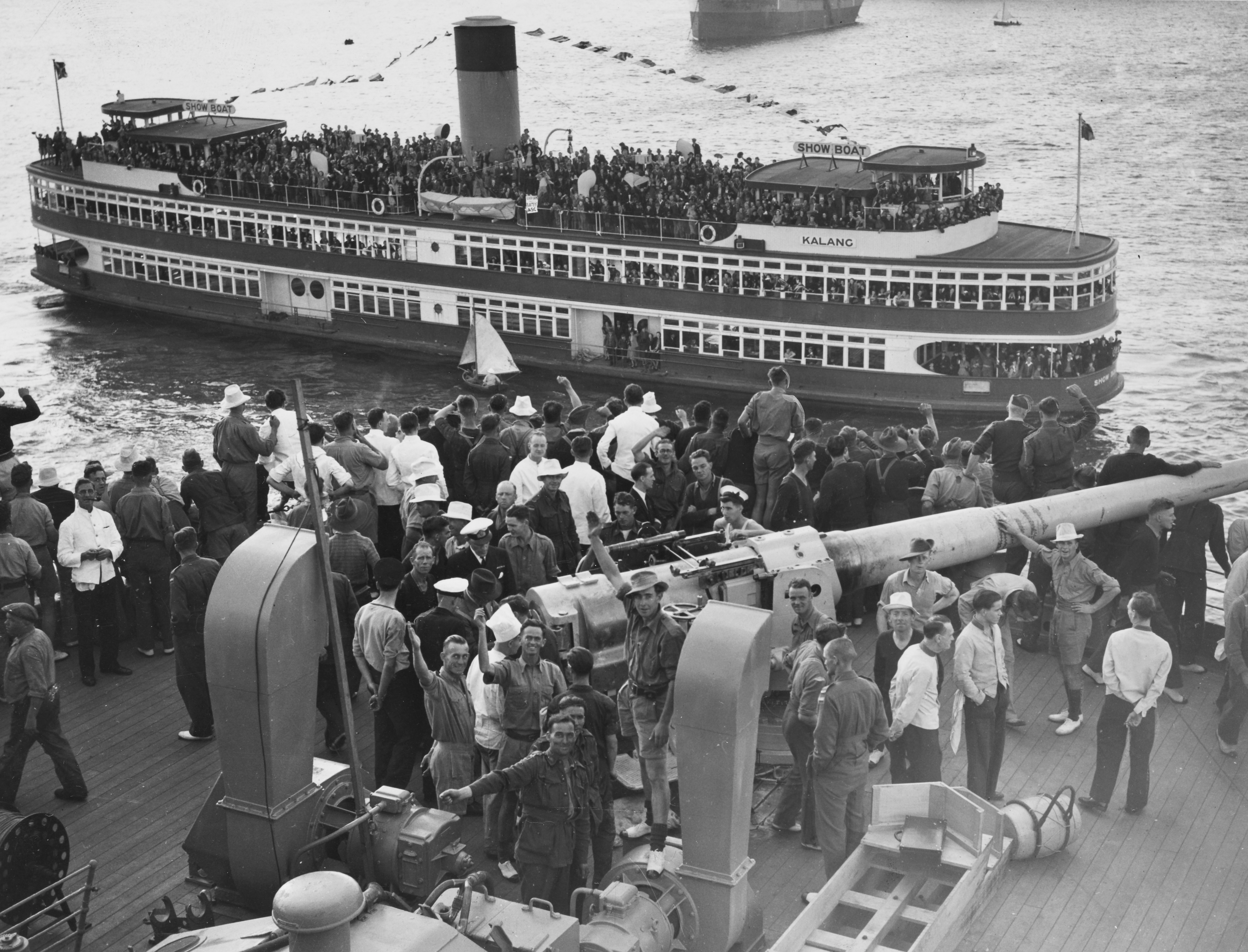
As recently converted to a show boat, circa 1940

Seeing the increasing popularity of harbour cruises, Sydney Ferries Limited converted the laid up Koondooloo as a two-decked showboat (one enclosed lower deck and an open upper deck). Such was Koondooloo's success, in 1938, Kalang was converted to a showboat with two full-length enclosed decks and a third open upper deck. A third deck was added to Koondooloo. Kalang could carry almost 2,000 passengers in her new configuration. and she and Kalang operated on the harbour as twin showboats until World War 2.

== World War 2 ==
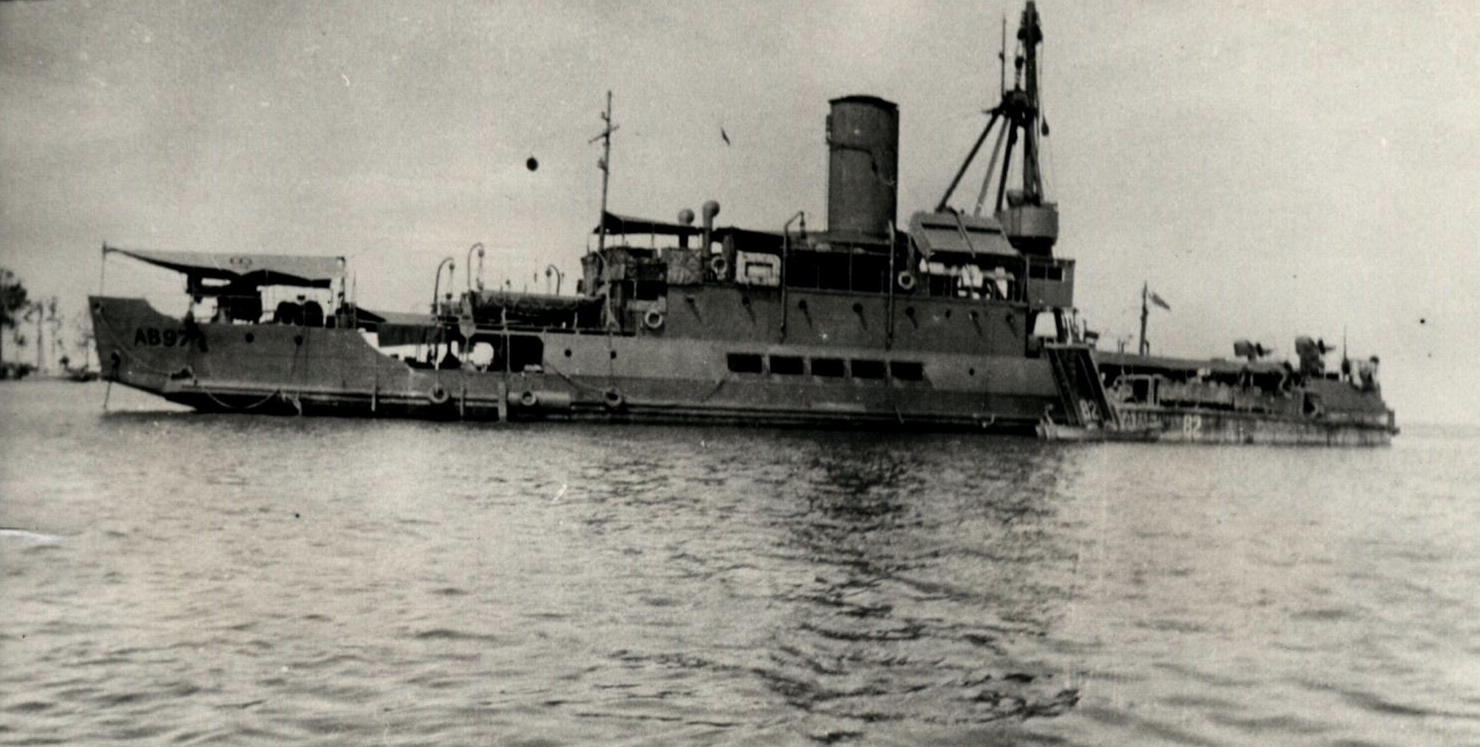
Kalang as converted to AEME floating workshop during World War 2

Following the outbreak of war in the Pacific, in October 1942, Kalang was stripped of her upper decks and fittings, and converted to AEME floating workshop (repair ship) Kalang AB97. She had a crew of 82, most of whom were engineers. In October 1942, she steamed up the Australian east coast, stopping at Brisbane, Rockhampton, Townsville, and Cairns, before crossing the Coral Sea to Samarai. The under-surface of her flat bow, designed for her original use as a vehicular ferry, magnified the impact of large waves. Her coal fired engines gave her a range of 1,600 nautical miles, which was less than a diesel vessel could manage. She was used as a repair ship in Rabaul and Torokina. She returned to Sydney via Thursday Island.

== Showboat (1940s to 1960s) ==
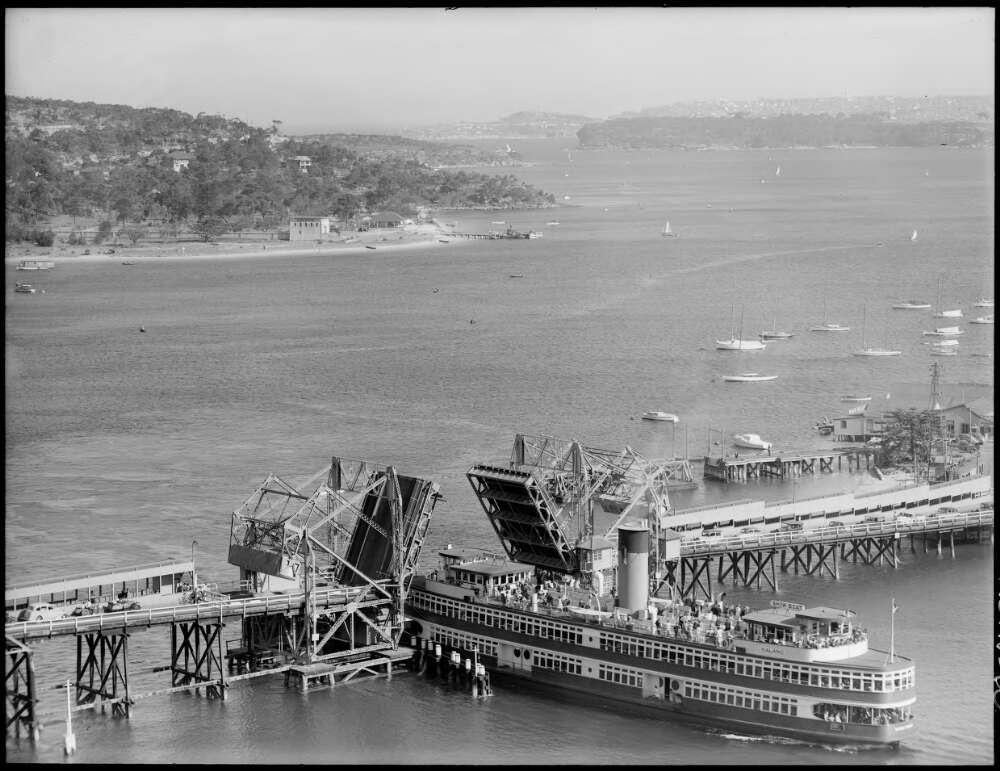
Passing through the old Spit Bridge, late 1940s or early 1950s.

Following the end of the war, Kalang was converted back to a show boat at the State Dockyards in Stockton in 1947 to essentially her pre-war showboat configuration. Her first post-war showboat trip was in 1947.

She became a familiar sight again on the harbour, especially at night as her passengers danced to the band on her large ballroom floor, enjoyed the cabaret shows, or canoodled on the upper deck.

On her morning excursions she'd go under the Sydney Harbour Bridge and up into the Lane Cove River, then up the Parramatta River as far as Mortlake. In the afternoon, she left Circular Quay for the south shore of Sydney Harbour, then went under the Spit Bridge and through Middle Harbour and across to Killarney picnic ground.

Said to be “the best place in Sydney for a party”, in post war years, she carried an estimated quarter of a million passengers a year on harbour cruises. The Sun Herald wrote that "she was a rendezvous for socials and charity events; cars were ‘launched’ on her; church groups held hymn singing socials; and models launched furs, bikinis and glamorous clothes."

Being a profitable enterprise for Sydney Ferries Limited, she was not included in the 1951 government takeover of the rest of the otherwise struggling Sydney Ferries fleet, and she continued to operate as a showboat. However, her success began to faded later in the 1950s. Rising costs (she required a crew of 25 including catering staff) and decreasing business saw her laid up with her last run as Kalang on Saturday 9 March 1959.

In 1960, a group of Sydney businessmen bought her, painted her all white and renamed her Sydney Queen. However, her original success as a showboat could not be repeated and she was laid up in 1963, and her owners ended up in court. She was laid up between 1963 and 1971 in Snails Bay, Sydney, and her paint peeled and vandals caused damaged. Unrealised plans for her future included using her as a floating restaurant, an off-shore casino, and as ferry in Hong Kong.

== Demise ==
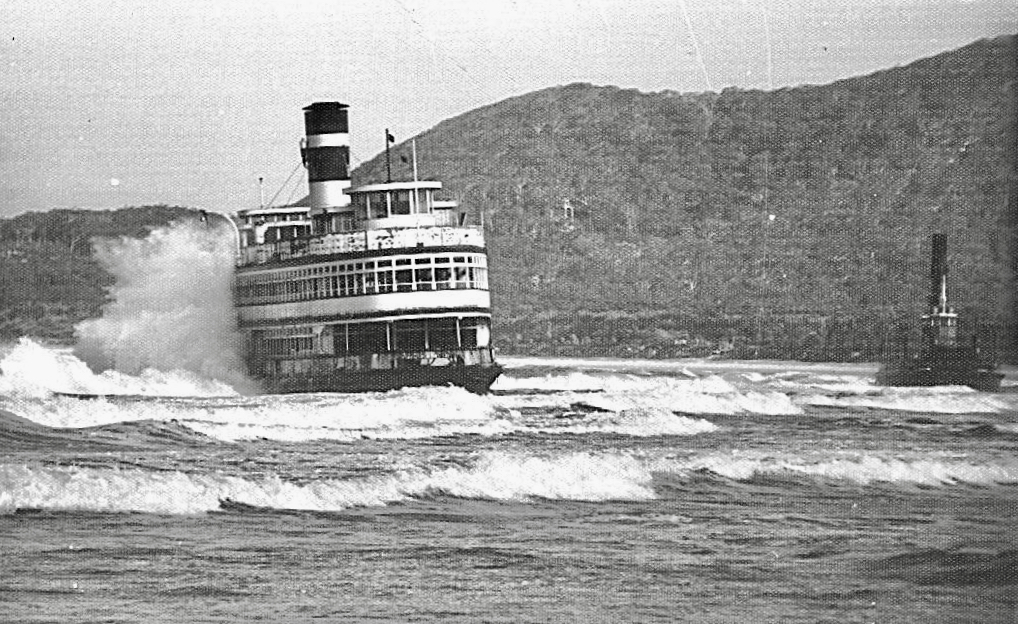
Beached at Trial Bay with Koondooloo in the background, January 1972

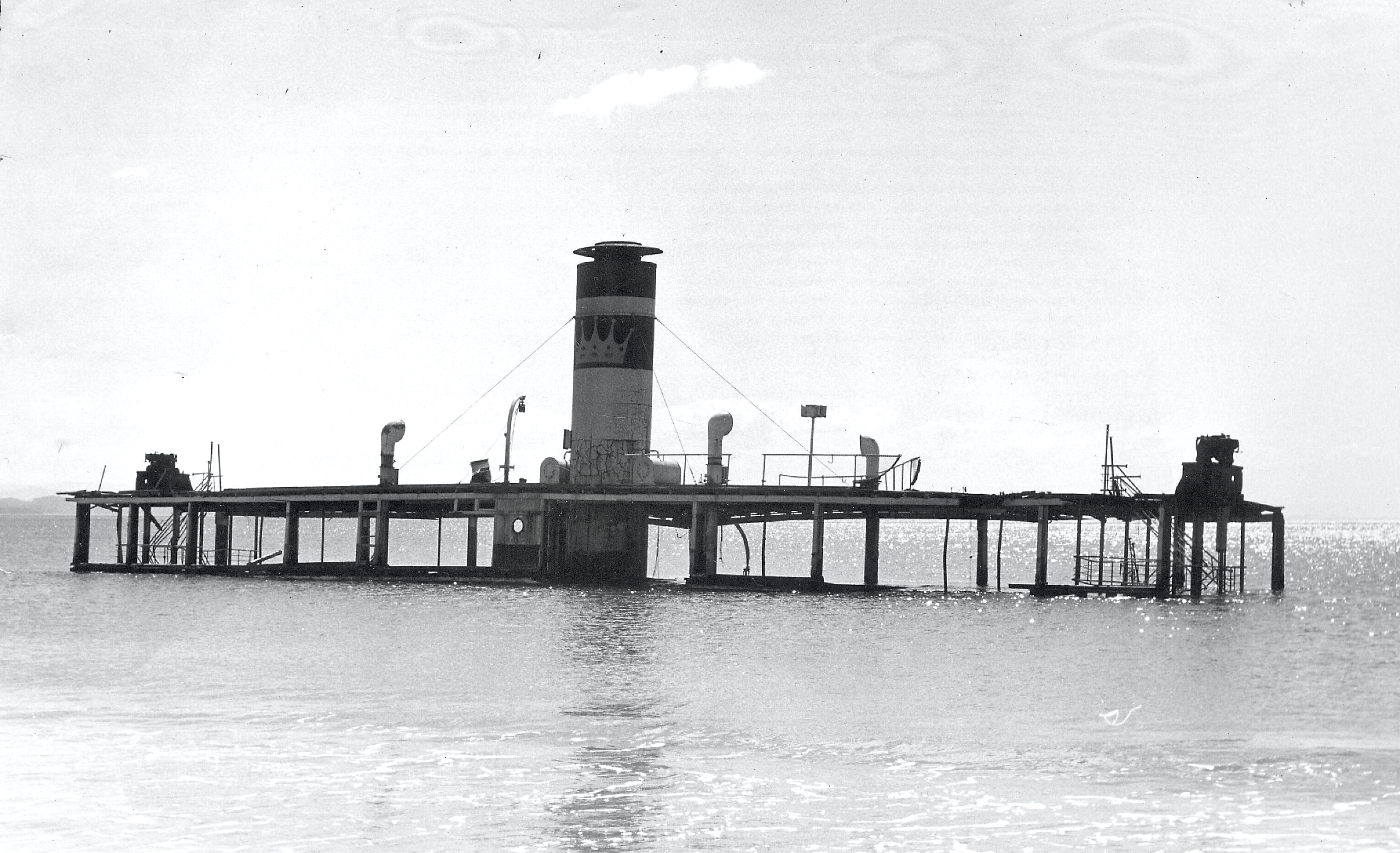
The lighter parts of the superstructure have been torn away by big seas. The steam steering motors can be seen at either end.

Sydney Queen, along with former running mates, car ferries Koondooloo and Kooroongabba, and the Lurgerena of Hobart, was sold to Stuart White of Gold Fields Metal Traders in November 1971. Sydney Queen had been in laid up in Sydney, and her new owner had her towed to Newcastle to join the other three ferries. The four were to be taken to Manila with the possible intention of being used as a ferry/boat. The Philippines tug, Polaris, formerly RAN tug HMAS Reserve, attempted to tow them in two lines to Manila.

Kooroongabba sank shortly after leaving Newcastle. Polaris was forced to anchor in Trial Bay, near Kempsey, to carry out repairs, at which point the three ferries went ashore one after the other over several days. Futile attempts were made to pull them off the beach, however, they remained stuck fast and the sea quickly broke up the lighter superstructures.

== See also ==
- List of Sydney Harbour ferries
- Timeline of Sydney Harbour ferries
