= Melanie Roberts =

British artistic gymnast (born 1988)

- Born: 13 May 1988 (age 38) Saltney
- Height: 156 cm (5 ft 1 in)

Gymnastics career
- Discipline: Women's artistic gymnastics
- Country represented: United Kingdom Wales

Melanie Roberts (born 13 May 1988 in Saltney, Flintshire, Wales) is a British retired gymnast.

At the age of five, Roberts started gymnastics at the Northgate Arena Leisure Centre in Chester. She later joined the City of Liverpool gym club.

In 2002, Roberts was named to the British team for the Junior European Championships even though her earlier rankings (20th and 18th) at the British Espoir Championships had not been strong. Her balance beam routine was one of the few performances by a junior to be broadcast on Greek television, which brought her considerable popularity. She performed strongly at a number of competitions in 2002 before an elbow injury in 2003. After recovering, she resumed competition, including taking gold on the balance beam at the Northern European Gymnastics Championships in Lisburn in 2005.
