= Saltney Ferry railway station =

Former railway station in Flintshire, Wales

Saltney Ferry
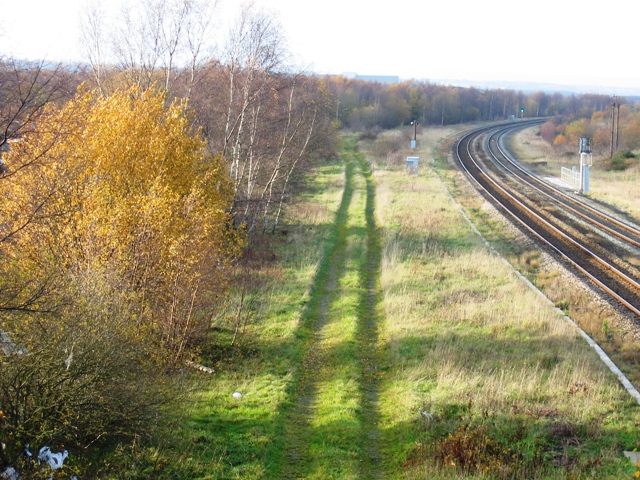
- Site of the now-demolished station, in 2006

General information
- Location: Saltney, Flintshire; Wales
- Coordinates: 53.1799°N 2.9464°W
- Grid reference: SJ367652
- Platforms: 2

Other information
- Status: Disused

History
- Original company: London and North Western Railway
- Pre-grouping: London and North Western Railway
- Post-grouping: London, Midland and Scottish Railway

Key dates
- 1 June 1891: Opened
- 30 April 1962: Closed
Location

Saltney Ferry (Mold Junction) railway station was located on the western edge of the town of Saltney on the Wales-England Border, between Flintshire (Wales) and Cheshire West and Chester (England).

== History ==
Opened 1 June 1891 by the London and North Western Railway, it was served by what is now the North Wales Coast Line between Chester, Cheshire and Holyhead, Anglesey. The station was the most eastern one on the line to be found in Wales, being just 1.5 km (0.93 mi) from the English border. The single island platform was reached by steps down from the road bridge.

Although technically on the North Wales Line the station was, for all practical purposes, on the Chester to Denbigh branch line as trains from the station generally only used the smaller line. The station however would have been busy with railway workers as the Mold Junction Motive power depot and employee cottages was right next to it. The station closed on 30 April 1962 and was subsequently demolished.

Preceding station	Disused railways	Following station
Sandycroft; Line open, station closed	London and North Western Railway; Chester and Holyhead Railway	Chester; Line and station open
Broughton and Bretton; Line and station closed	London and North Western Railway; Mold Railway	Chester; Line and station open
