= Ted Regan (footballer) =

Welsh footballer

Personal information
- Full name: Edward Gerald Patrick Regan
- Date of birth: 27 December 1900
- Place of birth: Saltney, Flintshire, Wales
- Position: Half back

Senior career*
| Years | Team | Apps | (Gls) |
| 1921–1928 | Wrexham | 188 | (14) |
- Manchester Central
- Fulham
- Derry City
- Belfast Celtic
- Connah's Quay & Shotton
- Colwyn Bay United
- Milford United
- Buckley Town
- * Club domestic league appearances and goals

Edward Gerald Patrick Regan (born 27 December 1900) was a Welsh footballer who played as a half-back. He made appearances in the English Football League for Wrexham and Fulham
