= J. Crichton & Company =

Welsh shipbuilding company

J. Crichton and Company
- Company type: Private
- Industry: Transportation
- Founded: 1913
- Founder: James Crichton
- Defunct: 1935
- Fate: Ceased Operations
- Headquarters: Saltney, Flintshire (1913–1935), Wales; Connah's Quay, Flintshire (1918–1935), Wales
- Number of locations: 2
- Products: stern-wheeler, coaster, barge, ferry, lightship, launch, tug, yacht
- Services: vessel repair, yacht and small boat repowering, upgrades, full service boat marina facility

J. Crichton and Company was a ship building company based at Saltney, Flintshire, North Wales. The company was set up by James Crichton in 1913. In 1918, the company acquired another shipyard, at Connah's Quay.

The company built stern-wheelers, coasters, barges, ferries, lightships, launches, tugs, and yachts.

The Saltney Yard closed in 1935.

== See also ==
- HMAS Kara Kara
