= Sandycroft =

Village in Flintshire, Wales

Coordinates: 53.195°N 2.999°W

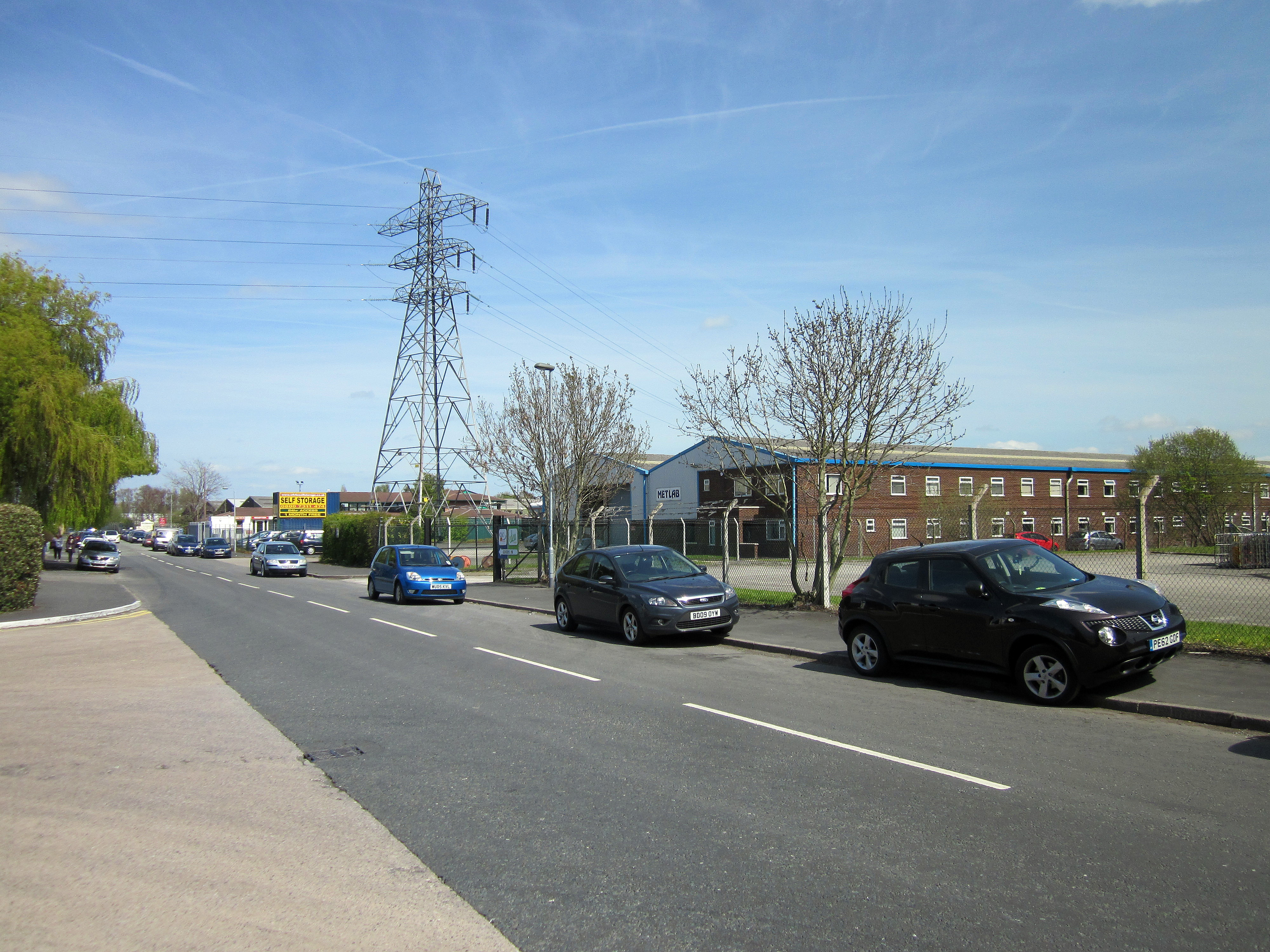
- Sandycroft Industrial Estate

- Location within Flintshire
- Population: 6,724 (2011)
- OS grid reference: SJ32916723
  - Cardiff: 153 miles
- Community: Hawarden; Queensferry
- Principal area: Flintshire
- Preserved county: Clwyd
- Country: Wales
- Sovereign state: United Kingdom
- Post town: DEESIDE
- Postcode district: CH5
- Dialling code: 01244
- Police: North Wales
- Fire: North Wales
- Ambulance: Welsh
- UK Parliament: Alyn and Deeside
- Senedd Cymru – Welsh Parliament: Alyn and Deeside

Sandycroft is a village in Flintshire, Wales, approximately 2 miles (3.2 km) southeast of Queensferry and 7 miles (11 km) west of Chester, on the B5129 road between Queensferry and Broughton. The community population taken at the 2011 census was 6,724.

== History ==
A shipyard operated in Sandycroft in the 19th Century. It built a number of vessels including the Royal Charter in 1855.

Sandycroft railway station was opened in 1884, and was served by the North Wales Coast Line for 77 years until its closure under the Beeching Axe in 1961.

== Geography ==
The village is part of the Deeside conurbation and is located immediately south of the River Dee, which is canalised at this point between Chester and the Dee Estuary. It is accessible from the A494 via the Queensferry Interchange.

Parts of Sandycroft suffered from floods in 2023 and 2024. Natural Resources Wales have carried out some remediation works on drainage channels in the village, and plan to complete these in 2025.

A large industrial estate lies to the north of the village, expanded in 2018 with the addition of a manufacturing site for Ifor Williams Trailers. The site was opened on 22 September 2018 by Ken Skates AM.
