= Broughton Hall, Flintshire =

Former country house in Wales

Coordinates: 53°9′24.01″N 3°0′14.60″W

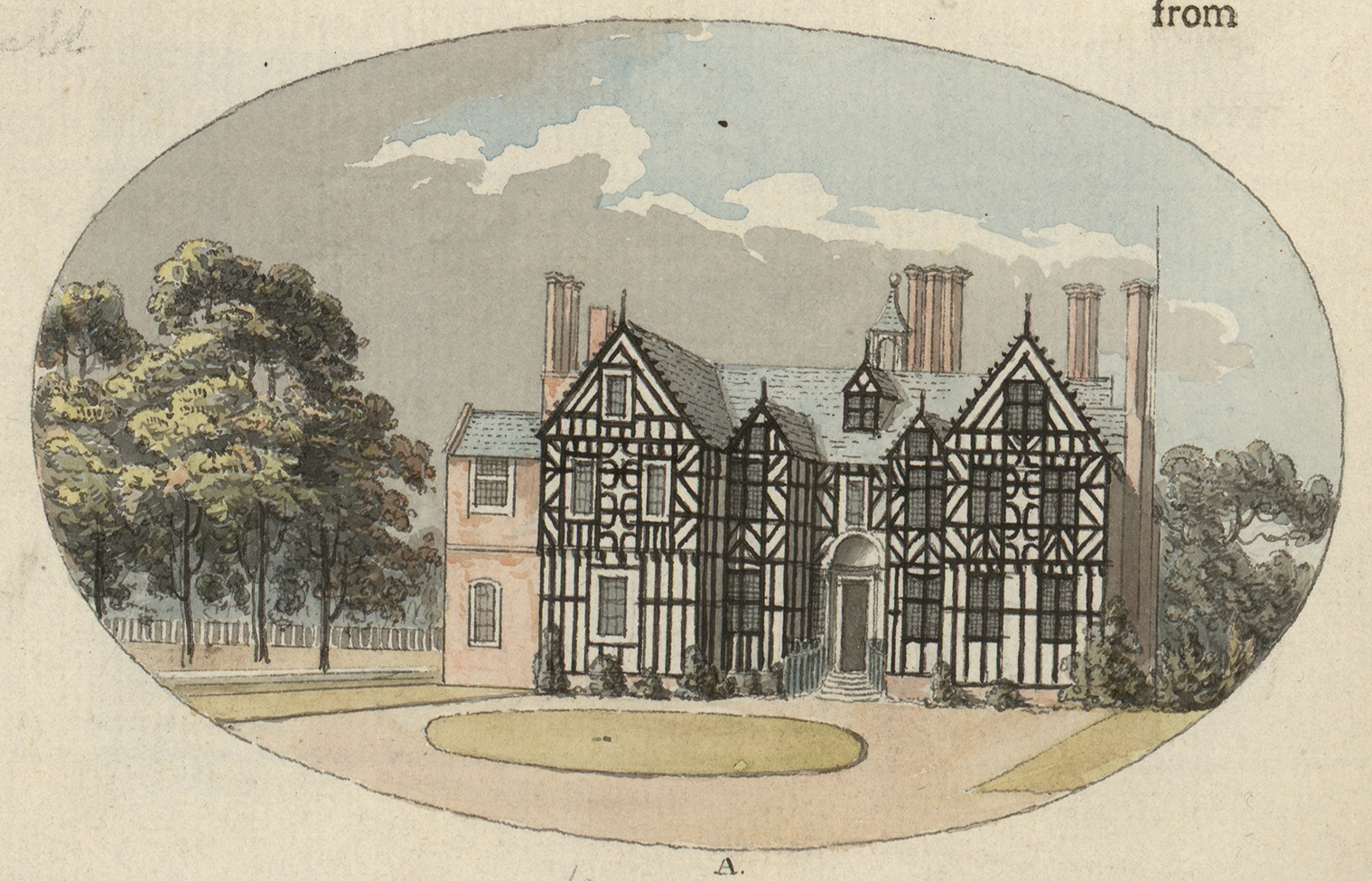
Broughton Hall, c.1781

Broughton Hall was a large country house that was located in Broughton, Flintshire, Wales. It was demolished in the early 1970s and houses now exist on the site. The only indication of its existence is the main road through the village; Broughton Hall Road.

Richard Slaughter was resident from 1754, it was during this time that the front of the old mansion house was rebuilt in the Gothic style

In 1830 the Broughton Hall estate was purchased by the Glynne family and was leased to various members of the gentry. William Johnson, corn merchant, magistrate, alderman and mayor of Chester and his family lived there during the latter years of the nineteenth century. During his time living at Broughton Hall, William Johnson made significant donations to the local church that included; the addition of a chancel and two stained glass windows in 1876-7. Stone portraits of William Johnson and his wife exist, on the outside of the church, as carvings either side of one of the stained glass windows

In 1883 the mining engineer, Horace Mayhew and family came to live in the area, eventually residing at Broughton Hall by the time of the 1901 census.

An advertisement, for leasing the property, in 1895 describes the property as having five reception rooms, a billiard room, fourteen bedrooms, kitchen, cellars, stabling and gardens
