= Reg Spencer =

Welsh-born English footballer

Personal information
- Date of birth: 1 December 1908
- Place of birth: Queensferry, Flintshire, Wales
- Date of death: 16 March 1981 (aged 72)
- Place of death: Chester, England
- Height: 5 ft 5 in (1.65 m)
- Position: Left half

Senior career*
Years	Team	Apps	(Gls)
1931–1939	Tranmere Rovers	235	(3)
- * Club domestic league appearances and goals

Reg Spencer (1 December 1908 – 16 March 1981) was an English footballer who played as a left half for Tranmere Rovers. He made 261 appearances for Tranmere, scoring 3 goals.
