= Bretton, Flintshire =

Village in Flintshire, Wales

Coordinates: 53.16891°N 2.98067°W

Bretton
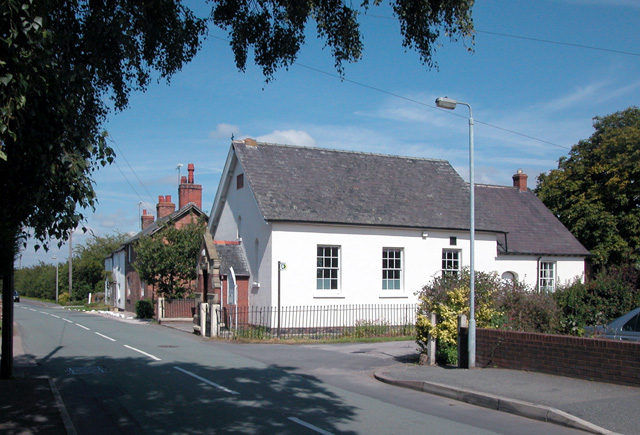
- Bretton Methodist Church

- Location within Flintshire
- Population: 5,791 (2001 Census)
- OS grid reference: SJ3563
- Community: Broughton and Bretton
- Principal area: Flintshire
- Preserved county: Clwyd
- Country: Wales
- Sovereign state: United Kingdom
- Post town: CHESTER
- Postcode district: CH4
- Dialling code: 01244
- Police: North Wales
- Fire: North Wales
- Ambulance: Welsh
- UK Parliament: Alyn and Deeside
- Senedd Cymru – Welsh Parliament: Alyn and Deeside

Bretton is a village in Flintshire, Wales. It is located to the west of the city of Chester, near the border with Cheshire, England. Along with the nearby village of Broughton, the population was 5,791 at the 2001 Census.

== History ==
The placename Bretton is probably derived from the Old Norse (ON) Bretar 'relating to the Britons (historical), the Welsh (people)' and the Old English language (OE) tūn 'farm or estate' The original settlers in Bretton were Viking welshmen, possibly second or third generation expatriates, distinctive in origin, culture, dress, accent or speech, who may well have called themselves, or been described by the English (and perhaps the Welsh), as ON Bretar rather than OE Walas or OE Cumbras.

Bretton Canal (also known as Sir John Glynne's Canal) was the western end of the waterway that crossed the Saltney Marsh on a route for two miles, and then turned to meet the new channel of the Dee a short distance away. It was used to transport coal from the mines owned by the Glynne family. The canal was abandoned in 1775 after only 10 years use, it eventually disappeared with the Saltney Marsh Inclosure Act 1778 (18 Geo. 3. c. 90 Pr.).

The village has had two public houses, The Grosvenor Arms, located adjacent to the bakery and nicknamed "The Dogs" and The Glynne Arms located near the station. The Grosvenor Arms closed in the early part of the 20th century and The Glynne Arms closed in 2007 and re-opened in 2010 as The New Glynne Arms.

Bretton also has a water pump on a roadside green. The disappearance of the pump during remodelling of the road junction was a source of concern to local residents in the 1970s, until it was traced to a council storage yard and reinstated.

Bretton Wood (south east of the village) is marked on Ordnance Survey maps of the area, in past times it was referred to as Bretton Forest, it stretches a considerable distance into Lower Kinnerton and Dodleston where it is known as Black Wood. The wood was cut into two parts when the Chester Southerly By-pass (A55 road) was constructed in 1976. Bretton Lodge was a gatehouse, at the entrance of Bretton Wood for the carriage road that led, via Balderton, Cheshire to Eaton Hall, Cheshire, evidence suggests that a lodge building was present in the 17th century. It was demolished in the early 1980s to make way for the extension to the bridge over the A55 road.

On 26 September 1976, human error brought ruin to the houses adjacent to the south side of the main Chester road (now the A5104 road). Workmen in Saltney left a drainage ditch with a temporary cofferdam in place over the weekend that caused extensive flooding when the water from a deluge of rain backed up and flooded all the houses and surrounding land.

In 2010 a residents committee was formed, Bretton Residents Action Group (BRAG), to ensure that future development surrounding the village did not adversely affect village life and to develop community activities. A link to the village website is at the foot of the webpage.

== Methodist Chapel ==
The current Methodist chapel was built in 1859, although evidence suggests that Methodist worship was present in the village before this. In 1830 a petition was submitted to the House of Lords stating that the Members of the Methodist Congregation assembled at Bretton, in the County of Flint, whose Names are thereunto subscribed; praying their Lordships "to adopt Measures for the Extinction of Slavery, and the Extension of all the Blessings of Freedom to the utmost Limits of the British Empire; and for a Reform of Parliament:"

The chapel was extended, in 1920, by the addition of a front porch to commemorate the villagers who gave their lives in World War I. Two stone inscriptions, either side of the entrance, are dedicated to the memory of:-

Private Edward James ALLMAN 6th Battalion South Wales Borderers, died 28 May 1918, commemorated Soissons Memorial, Aisne, France. Son of George & Mary Ann Allman of Bretton Lodge

Lance Corporal Henry Thomas ASBURY Royal Engineers died 1st Feb 1919, buried Murmansk, New British Cemetery, Russian Federation.

Private Walter LONG 1st Battalion Cheshire Regiment, died 20th Jun 1915, commemorated Ypres (Menin Gate), Belgium.

Private Jonas PATTLE 4th Battalion Royal Welsh Fusiliers, died 23 May 1918, commemorated Arras Memorial, Pas-de-Calais, France.

Gunner Jack WHITELEGGE 275th Brigade Royal Field Artillery, died 31st Jul 1917, commemorated Ypres (Menin Gate), Belgium.

Not commemorated on the remembrance porch, but on the list inside the chapel entrance:-

Private Arthur THOMAS Royal Welch Fusiliers died 10th Dec 1917, buried Erquinghem-Lys Churchyard Extension, France. Son of James & Ann Thomas of Bretton Lodge

== Farming ==
The land surrounding the village has been used for farming for several hundred years. The land that lies to the south of the village was part of the Eaton Estate belonging to the Grosvenor family, the land to the north of the village was part of the Gladstone Estate, formerly belonging to the Glynne family. Several farming properties and tied cottages carry emblems or design features of these estates.

Many diverse farming practices have been seen during the 20th and 21st century these include traditional arable and small herd dairy farming, intensive pig farming and turf farming.

Catherine Farm (and Mary Farm in nearby Broughton, Flintshire) disappeared from the landscape when the Vickers Armstrong aircraft factory was built in 1939.

Farms-
Bretton Hall
- The boundary between Bretton in Wales and Dodleston in England cuts through the corner of this farmland.
Bretton Hall Farm
- former Grosvenor Estate farm with distinctive John Douglas style design features, now converted into offices available for rental.
Hopes Place
-empty property, not farmed
Hopes Place Farm
- former Grosvenor Estate farm with distinctive John Douglas (architect) style design features, now family owned dairy farm. Suggestion is made that the Hope family descended from Hugh Hope of Hawarden and that Place is a corruption of the Welsh word plas meaning 'large house or mansion'. In several instances in the Parish Registers it is given as if the name of a township.
Holly Bush Farm
- former Grosvenor Estate farm, demolished in the late 1960s and rebuilt, former pig farm now free range poultry.
Well House Farm
- private residence, farm outbuildings converted into offices.
Brook Farm
- owned by Flintshire County Council and renamed Welsh: Tri Ffordd providing training and hands on work experience for adults with learning difficulties who interested in horticulture.
Digby Farm
- now a Caravan Club touring caravan site.
Elm Farm
- family owned dairy farm, with outbuildings designed by John Douglas (architect).
Bretton Farm
- converted, along with the outbuildings, into private residences.
Bretton House Farm
- private residence, former veterinary surgery, farm outbuildings demolished in 1977 for a new house adjacent.
Bretton Lodge Farm
- family owned arable farm.
Springfield Farm
- former poultry farm, now private residence.

== Industry and commerce ==
After World War II a large British Road Services (BRS) depot and vehicle workshop, Premier Garage, was built on the main road, later becoming a commercial vehicle garage, undergoing several name changes; H&J Quick, Quicks of Chester, Bramhall Quick and now Evans Halshaw.

A provender mill was built at the end of Broughton Mills Road, Bretton to provide animal feed for the area. After the mill closed it was taken over, for a period, by the No-Nail Box Company for manufacture and distribution of their products. Several haulage and storage firms used the premises in the 1980s before the whole building was refurbished and became a curtain factory.

== Transport ==
The Mold Railway Company in 1847 were authorised to build a railway from Mold, Flintshire to Saltney. As well as transporting minerals mined in the Mold area, the railway also carried passengers. Opened in August 1849, Broughton & Bretton railway station provided a transport link for local residents. When opened the station was called Broughton but it was renamed by the LNWR in April 1861 to Broughton Hall. It received another name change in July 1908 to Broughton and Bretton.

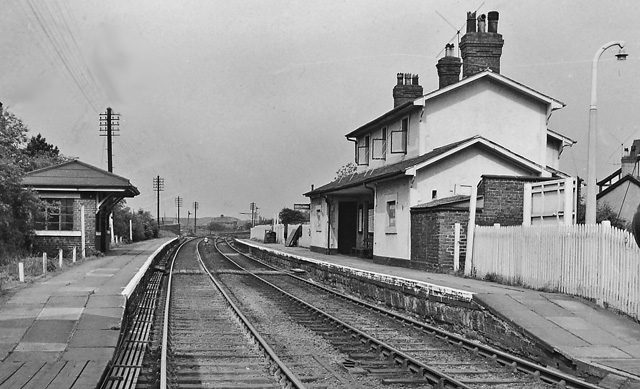
Broughton & Bretton Station in 1961

The station closed to regular passenger services on 28 April 1962 but it remained in use for a workmen's train service from Chester to serve the nearby aircraft factory until 2 September 1963. After lying derelict since the closure of the railway, the station became a private dwelling before becoming the Station House Veterinary Centre, Bretton.

Bretton used to be connected via road link to Broughton via Bretton Bridge. This was an old railway bridge that existed until the creation of the Broughton Park shopping complex. The bridge is now a public footpath with flagpoles at its summit. It is also of interest to note that in the late 1980s, residents in the Boulevard, Broughton have found remains of railway sleepers in rear gardens, from when the railway connected the villages of Broughton and Kinnerton. From the top of Bretton Bridge, the route of the former railway can be discerned. Part of the former trackbed is now a surface water drain within the country park in Broughton.
