= Queensferry railway station =

Former railway station in Flintshire, Wales

Queensferry
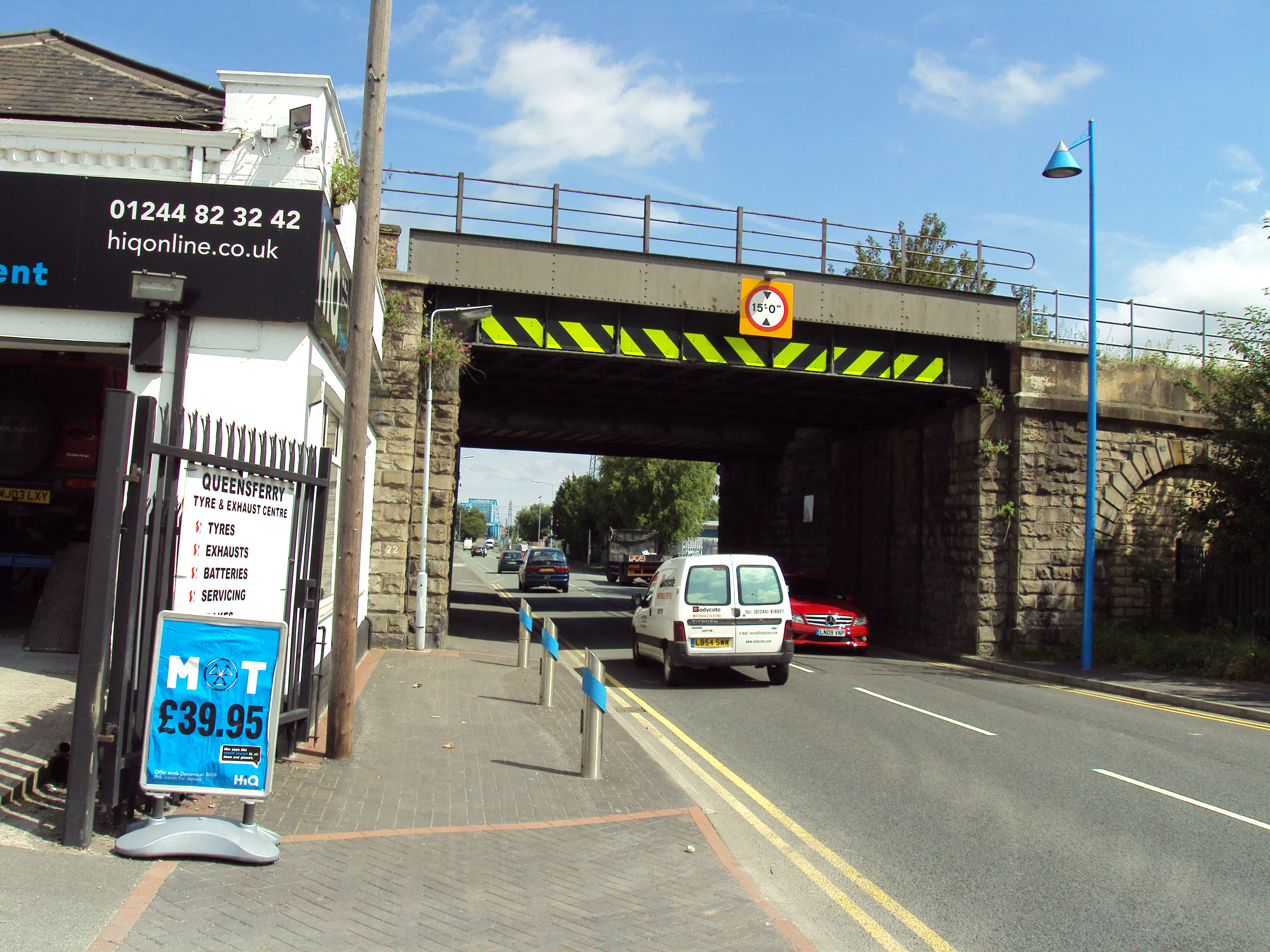
- Station Road under the North Wales Coast Line

General information
- Location: Queensferry, Flintshire; Wales
- Coordinates: 53.2082°N 3.0226°W
- Grid reference: SJ317684
- Platforms: 4

Other information
- Status: Disused

History
- Original company: Chester and Holyhead Railway
- Pre-grouping: London and North Western Railway
- Post-grouping: London, Midland and Scottish Railway

Key dates
- 1 May 1848: Opened
- 14 February 1966: Closed
Location

Queensferry railway station was a railway station located in Queensferry, Flintshire, Wales on the south bank of the canalised section of the River Dee.

== History ==
Opened on 1 May 1848 as part of the Chester and Holyhead Railway (now the North Wales Coast Line), it was one of the first stations on the line. Originally named Queen's Ferry, the station had two lines running through it but the stretch was quadrupled in the late 19th century. At its peak there were four platforms although two platforms were removed long before closure.

Goods services were halted 4 May 1964 and passenger services 14 February 1966. In the 1980s the number of tracks running through the abandoned site were reduced back down to two. Although most of the station building have gone one platform and the ticket office remain in situ.

Preceding station	Historical railways	Following station
Shotton; Line and station open	London and North Western Railway; North Wales Coast Line	Sandycroft; Line open, station closed
