= Sir John Glynne's Canal =

Coordinates: 53.171°N 2.946°W

Sir John Glynne's Canal was a canal in England built by Sir John Glynne. It ran from Saltney, just outside Chester to Bretton, a distance of about one mile. It was built about 1768, and was in use until 1779. It was used for the transportation of coal from mines in Flintshire into Chester.

== See also ==
- Canals of the United Kingdom
