= Horace Mayhew =

British mining engineer (1845–1926)

Horace Mayhew (20 June 1845 – 15 August 1926) of Broughton Hall, Flintshire, was a British mining engineer and colliery owner who founded the town of Broughton, Nova Scotia, now one of Canada's most famous ghost towns. He was the son of John Mayhew Esq of Platt Bridge House, Co. Lancaster, and Elizabeth Mayhew (née Rapley), JP Lancashire (1876), JP Flintshire (1888), Deputy Lieutenant (1901), and High Sheriff of Flintshire (1904).

Educated at King William’s College, Isle of Man, Mayhew began his career as an apprentice with the Wigan, Coal and Iron Company Ltd. Mayhew soon established himself as a preeminent mining engineer managing and part-owning collieries throughout the Wigan district. He became Managing Director of the Brinsop Hall Colliery Company working in partnership with A. H. Leech.

Wigan experienced dramatic economic growth and the population grew rapidly as the coal and textile industry expanded in the 1870s and 1880s. Mayhew was well connected. His brother Walter was Mayor of Wigan between 1876 and 1878 and in 1883 Mayhew formed a partnership with W. E. Gladstone, then Prime Minister. He started managing Gladstone’s extensive collieries and brickworks in Hawarden and in 1888 took over Halls Collieries at Swadlincote, Burton-on-Trent employing close to 2,000 mineworkers.

== Broughton, Nova Scotia ==
In the early 20th century Horace Mayhew and Thomas Lancaster founded the town of Broughton, Nova Scotia and established the Cape Breton Coal, Iron & Railway Company. Mayhew was President of the company and also President of the Canada Land & Development Corporation on whose land the town of Broughton was built. He was extensively involved in the planning of Broughton and invested heavily in the development of the town and mines, of which there were several workable seams.

Construction of the town began in 1905, with streets laid out and a number of large official buildings constructed, including the general mining building, a church, the Broughton Arms Hotel and the Crown Hotel. The town was one of the first planned communities in Canada and the Broughton Arms, a palatial hotel, was said to be the ‘best east of Montreal’. The hotel boasted all the modern conveniences including the first revolving door in the Americas. The distinctive architecture of rounded towers and verandahs marked it as an upper-class hotel.

Mayhew’s eldest son, Horace Dixon Mayhew Jnr, came out to Cape Breton Island with his father, spending the winter of 1906 at Broughton. Mayhew lobbied the Nova Scotia government (of George Murray) to increase rail subsidies without success and the untimely death of his son on 12 August 1906 coincided with the decline in Broughton's success.

The company went bankrupt in 1907 after it failed to secure rail transportation to get its coal to port, largely because of opposition from its Cape Breton competition, the Dominion Coal Company. Mayhew returned to Flintshire and established a new practice with his remaining sons. The firm Mayhew & Mayhew later owned several collieries in the Buckley and Hawarden districts, including Aston Hall, Mare Hey, Dublin Main and Main coal collieries. He died in 1926.
