= Broughton & Bretton railway station =

Former railway station in Flintshire, Wales

Broughton & Bretton
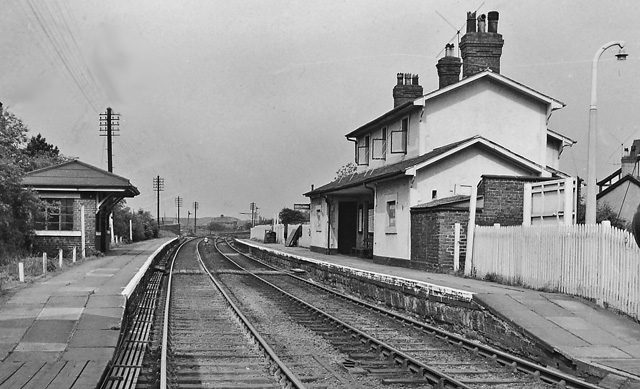
- The station in 1961

General information
- Location: Bretton, Flintshire; Wales
- Coordinates: 53.1713°N 2.9743°W
- Grid reference: SJ348642
- Platforms: 2

Other information
- Status: Disused

History
- Original company: Mold Railway
- Pre-grouping: London and North Western Railway
- Post-grouping: London, Midland and Scottish Railway

Key dates
- 14 August 1849: Opened as Broughton
- April 1861: Renamed Broughton Hall
- 1 July 1908: Renamed Broughton & Bretton
- 30 April 1962: Closed for passengers (except workmen's trains)
- 2 September 1963: Workmen's trains withdrawn
- 4 May 1964: Closed for freight
Location

Broughton & Bretton railway station was a station in Bretton, Flintshire, Wales near Broughton, Flintshire. The station was opened on 14 August 1849 under the name Broughton, renamed Broughton Hall in 1861, and Broughton & Bretton in 1908. It was completely closed on 4 May 1964. The station building is now in use as veterinary practice and the east bound platform waiting shelter is still extant.

The old station is now a Veterinary Centre named "Station House Veterinary Centre".

Preceding station	Disused railways	Following station
Kinnerton; Line and station closed	London and North Western Railway; Mold Railway	Saltney Ferry; Line open, station closed
