= Broughton, Nova Scotia =

Community in Nova Scotia, Canada

Coordinates: 46°4′52.38″N 59°57′48.69″W

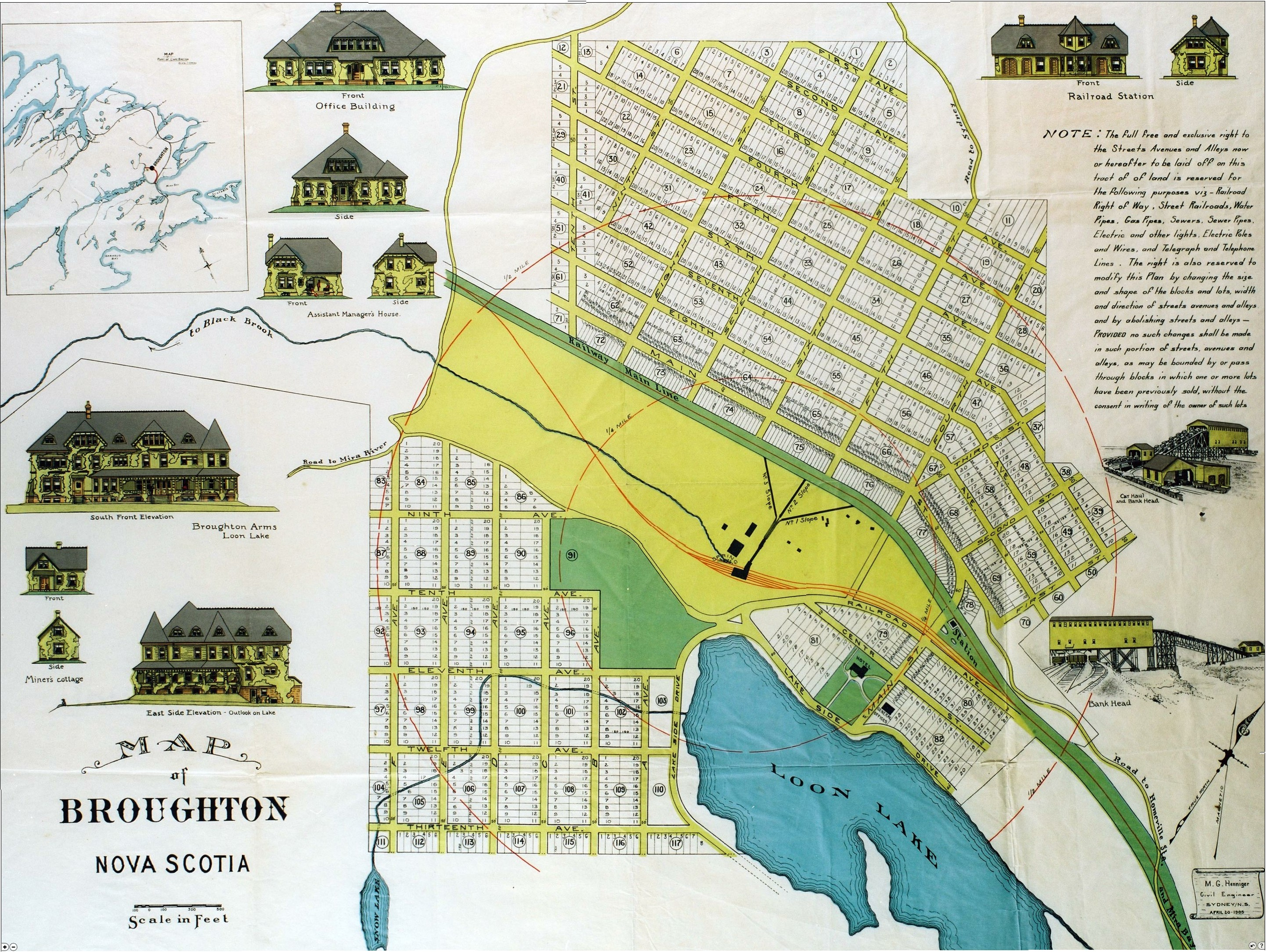
Planned Development c.1905

Broughton (2001 pop.: 24) was a former town in the Cape Breton Regional Municipality about 19 kilometers from the city of Sydney, Nova Scotia. It was going to be one of Canada's first planned towns, designed to eventually accommodate 10,000 residents. In reality, it was mostly abandoned when mining operations failed.

During the First World War, Broughton was used by the 185th Cape Breton Highlanders as training ground. During this time, the famous Broughton Arms Hotel burned to the ground in April 1916. The Hotel is believed to have had North America's first revolving door.

Broughton in Nova Scotia

== History ==
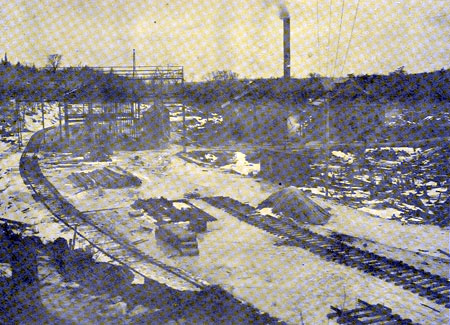
Mine Yard c.1905

Broughton was first settled at the turn of the 20th century as a mining town for the Cape Breton Coal, Iron & Railway Company. British mining engineer Thomas Lancaster and British businessman Col. Horace Mayhew, who owned the company, intended to develop the coal seam at Loon's Lake. The pair raised millions of dollars, mostly from English investors, and construction on the town was started, with streets laid out and a number of large official buildings constructed, including the Office Building, the Assistant Manager's House, the Broughton Arms Hotel and Crown Hotel. Remains of these substantial buildings can still be seen today, the scale of which giving an impression of the town's lofty ambitions.

A railway was built connecting to the Sydney & Louisburg Railway at False Bay Head, continuing through Broughton Junction to Broughton, a distance of four and a half miles. Construction began in 1905 and the railway was completed in 1906. Unfortunately, due to the high costs of building such a modern town, the company went bankrupt in 1907. They could not afford to secure rail transportation to get coal from the mine to port. Quickly after these problems arose, Lancaster and Mayhew left Cape Breton, abandoning the company and the town.

The community remained active until its peak in 1916. The army had taken over the hotels to house 1200 soldiers during the First World War. After the end of the war, the community declined rapidly. Some residents still live in the area, mostly on Broughton Road, but the town itself no longer exists.
