= Sandycroft railway station =

Former railway station in Flintshire, Wales

Sandycroft
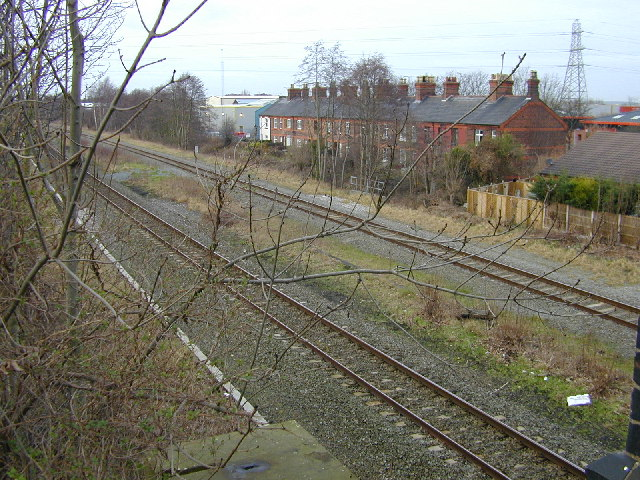
- Sandycroft railway station

General information
- Location: Sandycroft, Flintshire; Wales
- Coordinates: 53.1977°N 2.9964°W
- Grid reference: SJ334672
- Platforms: 2

Other information
- Status: Disused

History
- Original company: London and North Western Railway
- Pre-grouping: London and North Western Railway
- Post-grouping: London, Midland and Scottish Railway

Key dates
- 1 March 1884: Opened
- 1 May 1961: Closed
Location

Sandycroft railway station was located on the eastern edge of the village of Sandycroft, Flintshire.

== History ==
Opened on 1 March 1884 by the London and North Western Railway, it was served by what is now the North Wales Coast Line between Chester, Cheshire and Holyhead, Anglesey. The station was located in Deeside, in North West Wales.

It had two platforms made of wood, upon which were only very basic wooden waiting facilities, and a single storey brick booking office. The two platforms were connected by a footbridge and there was a signalbox positioned between the middle two of the four tracks.

In 1896 the then Archbishop of Canterbury, Edward Benson died at Hawarden Castle and his body was put on the train at Sandycroft to be returned to London. The station closed on 1 May 1961, although a private siding remained in use for some time after, and the 1980s the number of tracks running through the abandoned site were reduced down to two. The signal box was taken out of use and demolished in 2005 and there are no structures or platforms on the site left to be seen.

| Preceding station | Historical railways | Following station |
|---|---|---|
| Queensferry; Line open, station closed | London and North Western Railway; North Wales Coast Line | Chester; Line and station open |
