= Broughton, Flintshire =

Village in Flintshire, Wales

Coordinates: 53.169°N 2.985°W

Broughton: Welsh: Brychdyn
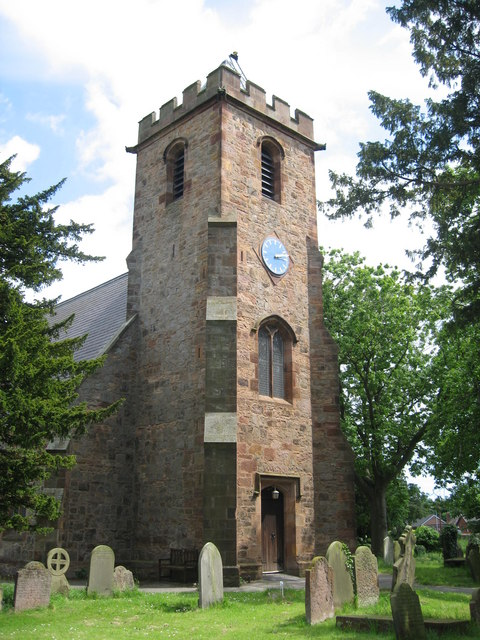
- St Mary's Church, Broughton

- Location within Flintshire
- Population: 6,535 (2021 Census)
- OS grid reference: SJ342640
- Community: Broughton and Bretton
- Principal area: Flintshire
- Preserved county: Clwyd
- Country: Wales
- Sovereign state: United Kingdom
- Post town: CHESTER
- Postcode district: CH4
- Dialling code: 01244
- Police: North Wales
- Fire: North Wales
- Ambulance: Welsh
- UK Parliament: Alyn and Deeside
- Senedd Cymru – Welsh Parliament: Alyn and Deeside

Broughton (Welsh: Brychdyn) is a village in Flintshire, Wales, close to Chester and the Anglo-Welsh border, in the community of Broughton and Bretton. Along with the nearby village of Bretton, the total population was 5,974 at the 2011 Census, increasing to 6,535 at the 2021 Census.

Broughton is home to a large aircraft factory at Hawarden Airport. This was completed in 1939 for use by Vickers-Armstrongs, who built 5,786 Wellington bombers. De Havilland Aircraft took over the factory in 1948 and built 2,816 planes of several designs. Today, the plant is an Airbus factory that manufactures wings for the A320, A330 and A350 aircraft. Airbus wings produced there are flown out in Airbus Beluga and BelugaXL planes (while still in construction, larger A380 wings were transported by barge along the River Dee to the nearby Mostyn docks). The Broughton factory was featured in the 2011 BBC Television programme How to Build a Super Jumbo Wing.

Broughton is home to Cymru Premier football team Airbus UK Broughton, who joined the highest division of the Welsh football pyramid in 2004 and remained there for 13 years, before relegation at the end of the 2016/17 season. They subsequently won promotion back to the Welsh Premier League for the 2019/20 season. The club was formed in 1946 as Vickers-Armstrongs, and several name changes took place until it adopted the current name. The club were relegated to the Cymru North after the 2019/20 season, but promoted back into the Cymru Premier for the 2022/23 season.

Broughton United are a successful grassroots club within the village. They club were formed when Broughton Super Saints and Broughton Park amalgamated.

Broughton has a primary school with over 500 pupils and pre-school nursery, which was created when the infant and junior schools amalgamated. The school's most recent ESTYN report rated it "Excellent" in all areas. Its students wear a distinctive purple uniform. The school incorporates the local library and a playgroup and toddler group was based there until closure.

The village has a shopping park, Broughton Shopping Park, where branches of major stores can be found. The village centre has a small collection of shops, and the Offas Dyke Hotel on Broughton Hall Road.

Broughton Hall was a large manor house situated on the housing estate where Forest Drive is now. Between 1849 and 1964, Broughton was served by Broughton & Bretton railway station. The Broughton War Memorial Institute is situated on Main Road, opposite the junction with Broughton Hall Road. The institute was built in lieu of a memorial stone to commemorate the sacrifice by residents of the village in military conflicts between 1914 and 1919, and hosts groups and events for the benefit of local people all year round.

Broughton is twinned with Auzeville-Tolosane (population 3,035), a commune in the suburbs of Toulouse, France.

== Notable people ==
- Horace Mayhew (1845–1926) of Broughton Hall, a mining engineer and colliery owner, founded the town of Broughton, Nova Scotia.
- Lieutenant-Colonel Sir John Dixon Mayhew (1884 at Broughton Hall – 1954) industrialist, army officer and politician.
