= Saltney =

Town in Wales and England

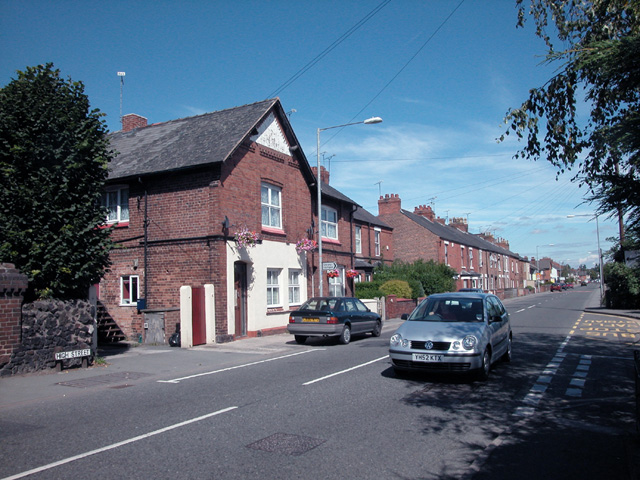
- Saltney High Street

- Location within the United Kingdom
- Population: 5,452 (2020 Estimate)
- OS grid reference: SJ375645
- Principal area: Flintshire
- Unitary authority: Cheshire West and Chester
- Preserved county: Clwyd
- Ceremonial county: Cheshire
- Region: North West
- Country: England & Wales
- Sovereign state: United Kingdom
- Post town: CHESTER
- Postcode district: CH4
- Dialling code: 01244
- UK Parliament: Chester South and Eddisbury (England) & Alyn and Deeside (Wales)
- Senedd Cymru – Welsh Parliament: Alyn and Deeside (Wales only)
- Website: saltneytowncouncil.gov.uk/ (Wales)
- List of places United Kingdom 53.179°N 2.922°W Map of the community covering parts of Saltney in Flintshire, Wales

Saltney is a town straddling the counties of Flintshire and Cheshire on the England–Wales border. The local government community of Saltney lies entirely in Wales, while the English areas are unparished. The town forms part of Chester's built-up area and is around 5 miles from Deeside.

Saltney is located next to the River Dee. In the 2001 census the population of the town was 4,769, rising to 5,132 at the time of the 2011 census.

== Location ==
Higher Saltney, known locally as "Top Saltney" is in Chester, Cheshire. The Welsh sector of the community is known as Saltney, and is known as "Saltney" in Welsh as well. The England–Wales border runs down the middle of Boundary Lane, one of only two urban streets in England and Wales where this happens (the other being in Llanymynech). Houses on the west side of the street are in the Flintshire County Council area and in the North Wales Police jurisdiction, while those on the east side are in the Cheshire West and Chester unitary authority area and in the Cheshire Police jurisdiction. in terms of policing, this refers to operations jurisdiction not legal jurisdiction. Officers from both forces have full legal jurisdiction throughout England & Wales; therefore, the border is largely immaterial for practical purposes. The west side is in the Alyn and Deeside parliamentary constituency, and the east is in Chester South and Eddisbury.

== History ==
Saltney's name is derived from the former salt marshes by the River Dee on which it is built. Once the terminus of Sir John Glynne's Canal, Saltney grew in the late 19th century and through the 20th century to its present population of over 5,000. Saltney Ferry railway station was open between 1891 and 1962.

Morfa Caer is an old Welsh name for the area.

Saltney was a location for shipbuilding and, in particular, chain-making and the manufacture of anchors. The firm Henry Wood & Company was first to establish an engineering works on the west bank of the Dee in 1847, with further industrial development continuing into the 1880s. Henry Wood's legacy is implemented with Wood Memorial CP School being named after him.

== Amenities ==
There is a public house called The City Arms in Higher Saltney, alongside The Anchor on the High Street. Other amenities in Saltney include the Corner Pin public house, a post office, Saltney Business Centre, St David's Retail Park and the Asda and Morrisons supermarkets.

Saltney has three primary schools, St Anthony's Catholic Primary, Saltney Ferry C.P. and Wood Memorial, which was subject to national media attention when a delivery of crumpets was stolen in 2015. St David's High School is the local secondary school for students from the surrounding areas.

The Anglican parish church is St Mark's which is in Higher Saltney. On the High Street can be found St Anthony of Padua Catholic Church and Saltney Methodist Church.

There is a community centre in the centre of Saltney which is regularly used by children's groups as well as being surrounded by fields where football tournaments are often held. The Community Centre is also home to Saltney Town FC who formed in 2010.

== Notable people ==
- Stephen Dewar Holden (1870–1918), engineer, locomotive superintendent of the Great Eastern Railway, 1908–1912
- Charles Sitch (1887–1960,) politician and MP for Kingswinford, 1918–1931
- Arthur Pearson (1897–1980), politician and MP for Pontypridd, 1938–1970
- Ted Regan (1900–1973), footballer with 188 caps with Wrexham A.F.C.
- Melanie Roberts (born 1988), retired artistic gymnast
- Bobby Evans (1885–1965), footballer who won ten caps for Wales between 1906 and 1910 before it was discovered he was born a few hundred metres on the English side of the border at Crane Bank in Chester. He subsequently won four England caps between 1911 and 1912.

== See also ==
- St Matthew's Church, Saltney
- Sealand, Flintshire, a nearby area of farmland reclaimed from the Dee estuary.
- Chester Corporation Tramways former tramway to Chester station
