= List of United Kingdom locations: Aa-Ak =

The United Kingdom

This is part of the list of United Kingdom locations: a gazetteer of place names in the United Kingdom showing each place's locality and geographical coordinates.

== Aa ==
Location	Locality	Coordinates (links to map & photo sources)	OS grid reference
Aaron's Hill	Surrey	51.17°N 00.64°W	SU9543

== Ab ==
=== Abb-Abd ===
Location	Locality	Coordinates (links to map & photo sources)	OS grid reference
Abbas Combe	Somerset	50.99°N 02.42°W	ST7022
Abberley	Worcestershire	52.30°N 02.38°W	SO7467
Abberton	Essex	51.83°N 00.90°E	TM0019
Abberton	Worcestershire	52.17°N 02.01°W	SO9953
Abbess End	Essex	51.77°N 00.27°E	TL5711
Abbess Roding	Essex	51.77°N 00.27°E	TL5711
Abbey	Devon	50.88°N 03.22°W	ST1410
Abbeycwmhir	Powys	52.32°N 03.39°W	SO0571
Abbeydale	Gloucestershire	51.84°N 02.20°W	SO8616
Abbeydale	Sheffield	53.33°N 01.52°W	SK3282
Abbeydale Park	Sheffield	53.31°N 01.53°W	SK3180
Abbey Dore	Herefordshire	51.96°N 02.90°W	SO3830
Abbey Field	Essex	51.87°N 00.89°E	TL9924
Abbey Gate	Devon	50.76°N 03.00°W	SY2997
Abbey Gate	Kent	51.29°N 00.50°E	TQ7558
Abbey Green	Shropshire	52.89°N 02.74°W	SJ5033
Abbey Green	Staffordshire	53.11°N 02.04°W	SJ9757
Abbey Head	Dumfries and Galloway	54.77°N 03.96°W	NX734442
Abbey Hey	Manchester	53.46°N 02.16°W	SJ8996
Abbeyhill	City of Edinburgh	55.95°N 03.17°W	NT2774
Abbey Hulton	City of Stoke-on-Trent	53.02°N 02.13°W	SJ9148
Abbey Mead	Surrey	51.39°N 00.50°W	TQ0467
Abbey St Bathans	Scottish Borders	55.85°N 02.38°W	NT7662
Abbeystead	Lancashire	53.98°N 02.67°W	SD5654
Abbeytown	Cumbria	54.83°N 03.29°W	NY1750
Abbey Village	Lancashire	53.69°N 02.54°W	SD6422
Abbey Wood	Greenwich	51.48°N 00.10°E	TQ4678
Abbey Yard	Dumfries and Galloway	54.95°N 03.98°W	NX7364
Abbots Bickington	Devon	50.89°N 04.30°W	SS3813
Abbots Bromley	Staffordshire	52.81°N 01.88°W	SK0824
Abbotsbury	Dorset	50.66°N 02.60°W	SY5785
Abbotsford	West Sussex	50.96°N 00.14°W	TQ3020
Abbotsham	Devon	51.01°N 04.25°W	SS4226
Abbotskerswell	Devon	50.50°N 03.62°W	SX8568
Abbots Langley	Hertfordshire	51.69°N 00.42°W	TL0901
Abbotsleigh	Devon	50.31°N 03.68°W	SX8048
Abbots Leigh	North Somerset	51.45°N 02.66°W	ST5473
Abbotsley	Cambridgeshire	52.18°N 00.21°W	TL2256
Abbot's Meads	Cheshire West and Chester	53.19°N 02.91°W	SJ3967
Abbots Morton	Worcestershire	52.19°N 01.97°W	SP0255
Abbots Ripton	Cambridgeshire	52.37°N 00.19°W	TL2377
Abbot's Salford	Warwickshire	52.14°N 01.91°W	SP0650
Abbotstone	Hampshire	51.10°N 01.20°W	SU5634
Abbotswood	Hampshire	51.00°N 01.48°W	SU3623
Abbotswood	Surrey	51.24°N 00.56°W	TQ0051
Abbots Worthy	Hampshire	51.08°N 01.30°W	SU4932
Abbotts Ann	Hampshire	51.18°N 01.54°W	SU3243
Abcott	Shropshire	52.39°N 02.89°W	SO3978
Abdon	Shropshire	52.47°N 02.63°W	SO5786
Abdy	Rotherham	53.47°N 01.35°W	SK4398

=== Abe ===
Location	Locality	Coordinates (links to map & photo sources)	OS grid reference
Aberaeron	Ceredigion	52.23°N 04.27°W	SN4562
Aberaman	Rhondda, Cynon, Taff	51.69°N 03.43°W	SO0101
Aberangell	Gwynedd	52.67°N 03.71°W	SH8410
Aber-arad	Carmarthenshire	52.03°N 04.46°W	SN3140
Aberarder	Highland	56.94°N 04.51°W	NN4787
Aberargie	Perth and Kinross	56.32°N 03.35°W	NO1615
Aberarth	Ceredigion	52.24°N 04.24°W	SN4763
Aberavon	Neath Port Talbot	51.59°N 03.80°W	SS7590
Aberbanc	Ceredigion	52.04°N 04.40°W	SN3541
Aberbargoed	Caerphilly	51.69°N 03.23°W	SO1500
Aberbechan	Powys	52.52°N 03.28°W	SO1393
Aberbeeg	Blaenau Gwent	51.71°N 03.14°W	SO2102
Aberbran	Powys	51.95°N 03.48°W	SN9829
Abercanaid	Merthyr Tydfil	51.71°N 03.37°W	SO0503
Abercarn	Caerphilly	51.63°N 03.14°W	ST2194
Abercastle	Pembrokeshire	51.95°N 05.13°W	SM8533
Abercegir	Powys	52.59°N 03.77°W	SH8001
Aberchalder	Highland	57.08°N 04.74°W	NH3403
Aberchirder	Aberdeenshire	57.55°N 02.63°W	NJ6252
Abercorn	West Lothian	55.98°N 03.47°W	NT0878
Abercraf	Powys	51.79°N 03.72°W	SN8112
Abercregan	Neath Port Talbot	51.65°N 03.66°W	SS8596
Abercrombie	Fife	56.20°N 02.79°W	NO5102
Abercwmboi	Rhondda, Cynon, Taff	51.68°N 03.41°W	ST0299
Abercych	Pembrokeshire	52.03°N 04.56°W	SN2440
Abercynon	Rhondda, Cynon, Taff	51.64°N 03.33°W	ST0895
Aber-Cywarch	Gwynedd	52.72°N 03.68°W	SH8615
Aberdalgie	Perth and Kinross	56.36°N 03.50°W	NO0720
Aberdare (Aberdar)	Rhondda, Cynon, Taff	51.70°N 03.44°W	SO0002
Aberdaron	Gwynedd	52.80°N 04.71°W	SH1726
Aberdaugleddau (Milford Haven)	Pembrokeshire	51.70°N 05.04°W	SM9005
Aberdeen	City of Aberdeen	57.14°N 02.13°W	NJ9206
Aberdesach	Gwynedd	53.03°N 04.35°W	SH4251
Aberdour	Fife	56.05°N 03.30°W	NT1985
Aberdulais	Neath Port Talbot	51.67°N 03.78°W	SS7799
Aberdyfi	Gwynedd	52.54°N 04.05°W	SN6196
Aberedw	Powys	52.11°N 03.35°W	SO0747
Abereiddy	Pembrokeshire	51.93°N 05.21°W	SM7931
Abererch	Gwynedd	52.89°N 04.39°W	SH3936
Aberfan	Merthyr Tydfil	51.69°N 03.34°W	SO0700
Aberfeldy	Perth and Kinross	56.61°N 03.87°W	NN8549
Aberffraw	Isle of Anglesey	53.18°N 04.47°W	SH3568
Aberffrwd	Ceredigion	52.38°N 03.94°W	SN6878
Aberffrwd	Monmouthshire	51.77°N 02.94°W	SO3509
Aberford	Leeds	53.82°N 01.34°W	SE4337
Aberfoyle	Stirling	56.17°N 04.38°W	NN5200
Abergarw	Bridgend	51.54°N 03.57°W	SS9184
Abergarwed	Neath Port Talbot	51.70°N 03.72°W	SN8102
Abergavenny (Y Fenni)	Monmouthshire	51.82°N 03.03°W	SO2914
Abergele	Conwy	53.27°N 03.59°W	SH9477
Aber-Giar	Carmarthenshire	52.04°N 04.18°W	SN5041
Abergorlech	Carmarthenshire	51.97°N 04.06°W	SN5833
Abergwaun (Fishguard)	Pembrokeshire	51.99°N 04.98°W	SM9537
Abergwesyn	Powys	52.15°N 03.68°W	SN8552
Abergwili	Carmarthenshire	51.86°N 04.28°W	SN4321
Abergwynfi	Neath Port Talbot	51.65°N 03.60°W	SS8996
Abergwyngregyn	Gwynedd	53.22°N 04.02°W	SH6572
Abergynolwyn	Gwynedd	52.63°N 03.96°W	SH6706
Aberhonddu (Brecon)	Powys	51.94°N 03.39°W	SO0428
Aberhosan	Powys	52.55°N 03.77°W	SN8097
Aberkenfig	Bridgend	51.53°N 03.60°W	SS8983
Aberlady	East Lothian	56.00°N 02.86°W	NT4679
Aberlemno	Angus	56.68°N 02.78°W	NO5255
Aberlerry	Ceredigion	52.50°N 04.06°W	SN6092
Aberllefenni	Gwynedd	52.66°N 03.82°W	SH7709
Abermagwr	Ceredigion	52.33°N 03.96°W	SN6673
Abermorddu	Flintshire	53.09°N 03.04°W	SJ3056
Abermule	Powys	52.53°N 03.24°W	SO1694
Abernant	Carmarthenshire	51.88°N 04.42°W	SN3323
Abernant	Powys	52.56°N 03.22°W	SO1797
Abernethy	Perth and Kinross	56.32°N 03.32°W	NO1816
Abernyte	Perth and Kinross	56.46°N 03.21°W	NO2531
Aberoer	Wrexham	53.03°N 03.07°W	SJ2849
Aberpennar (Mountain Ash)	Rhondda, Cynon, Taff	51.68°N 03.39°W	ST0499
Aberporth	Ceredigion	52.13°N 04.54°W	SN2651
Abersoch	Gwynedd	52.82°N 04.50°W	SH3128
Abersychan	Torfaen	51.72°N 03.07°W	SO2603
Abertawe (Swansea)	Swansea	51.62°N 03.96°W	SS6494
Aberteifi (Cardigan)	Ceredigion	52.08°N 04.67°W	SN1746
Aberthin	The Vale Of Glamorgan	51.46°N 03.44°W	ST0075
Abertillery (Abertyleri)	Blaenau Gwent	51.72°N 03.14°W	SO2104
Abertridwr	Caerphilly	51.59°N 03.27°W	ST1289
Abertridwr	Powys	52.76°N 03.43°W	SJ0319
Abertrinant	Gwynedd	52.62°N 04.02°W	SH6305
Abertyleri (Abertillery)	Blaenau Gwent	51.72°N 03.14°W	SO2104
Abertysswg	Caerphilly	51.73°N 03.26°W	SO1305
Aberuthven	Perth and Kinross	56.31°N 03.66°W	NN9715
Aber Village	Powys	51.88°N 03.30°W	SO1021
Aberyscir	Powys	51.95°N 03.47°W	SN9929
Aberystwyth	Ceredigion	52.40°N 04.08°W	SN5881

=== Abh-Aby ===
Location	Locality	Coordinates (links to map & photo sources)	OS grid reference
Abingdon-on-Thames	Oxfordshire	51.66°N 01.29°W	SU4997
Abinger Common	Surrey	51.19°N 00.41°W	TQ1145
Abinger Hammer	Surrey	51.21°N 00.44°W	TQ0947
Abington	Northamptonshire	52.24°N 00.87°W	SP7761
Abington	South Lanarkshire	55.48°N 03.69°W	NS9323
Abington Pigotts	Cambridgeshire	52.07°N 00.10°W	TL3044
Abington Vale	Northamptonshire	52.24°N 00.85°W	SP7861
Abingworth	West Sussex	50.93°N 00.43°W	TQ1016
Ab Kettleby	Leicestershire	52.80°N 00.93°W	SK7223
Ab Lench	Worcestershire	52.15°N 01.98°W	SP0151
Ablington	Wiltshire	51.21°N 01.78°W	SU1546
Ablington	Gloucestershire	51.76°N 01.85°W	SP1007
Abney	Derbyshire	53.30°N 01.71°W	SK1979
Aboyne	Aberdeenshire	57.07°N 02.79°W	NO5298
Abraham Heights	Lancashire	54.04°N 02.82°W	SD4661
Abram	Wigan	53.50°N 02.60°W	SD6001
Abriachan	Highland	57.38°N 04.41°W	NH5535
Abridge	Essex	51.64°N 00.10°E	TQ4696
Abronhill	North Lanarkshire	55.95°N 03.95°W	NS7875
Abshot	Hampshire	50.84°N 01.27°W	SU5105
Abson	South Gloucestershire	51.46°N 02.43°W	ST7074
Abthorpe	Northamptonshire	52.10°N 01.06°W	SP6446
Abune-the-hill	Orkney Islands	59.13°N 03.25°W	HY2828
Aby	Lincolnshire	53.28°N 00.11°E	TF4178

== Ac ==
=== Aca-Ach ===
Location	Locality	Coordinates (links to map & photo sources)	OS grid reference
Acarsaid	Highland	56.77°N 05.96°W	NM5872
Acaster Malbis	York	53.89°N 01.11°W	SE5845
Acaster Selby	North Yorkshire	53.86°N 01.13°W	SE5741
Accrington	Lancashire	53.74°N 02.38°W	SD7528
Acha	Argyll and Bute	56.59°N 06.59°W	NM1854
Achachork	Highland	57.42°N 06.21°W	NG4745
Achahoish	Argyll and Bute	55.93°N 05.55°W	NR7877
Achaleven	Argyll and Bute	56.44°N 05.39°W	NM9133
Achalone	Highland	58.48°N 03.45°W	ND1556
Acha Mor (Lewis)	Western Isles	58.15°N 06.57°W	NB3128
Achanelid	Argyll and Bute	56.03°N 05.21°W	NS0087
Ach'an Todhair	Highland	56.80°N 05.12°W	NN0972
Achaphubuil	Highland	56.83°N 05.14°W	NN0876
Acharacle	Highland	56.73°N 05.81°W	NM6767
Achargary	Highland	58.45°N 04.19°W	NC7254
Acharn	Angus	56.87°N 03.18°W	NO2876
Acharn	Perth and Kinross	56.56°N 04.03°W	NN7543
Achavandra Muir	Highland	57.91°N 04.07°W	NH7793
Achddu	Carmarthenshire	51.68°N 04.25°W	SN4401
Achfary	Highland	58.30°N 04.92°W	NC2939
Achfrish	Highland	58.07°N 04.44°W	NC5612
Achgarve	Highland	57.87°N 05.57°W	NG8893
Achiemore	Highland	58.49°N 03.90°W	NC8958
A' Chill	Highland	57.05°N 06.52°W	NG2605
Achiltibuie	Highland	58.01°N 05.35°W	NC0208
Achina	Highland	58.50°N 04.23°W	NC7060
Achindarroch	Highland	56.64°N 05.26°W	NN0055
Achininver	Highland	58.54°N 04.45°W	NC5764
Achintee	Highland	57.41°N 05.43°W	NG9441
Achintraid	Highland	57.38°N 05.59°W	NG8438
Achleck	Argyll and Bute	56.52°N 06.21°W	NM4145
Achluachrach	Highland	56.88°N 04.79°W	NN3081
Achlyness	Highland	58.42°N 05.01°W	NC2452
Achmelvich	Highland	58.16°N 05.31°W	NC0524
Achmore (near Ullapool)	Highland	57.91°N 05.34°W	NH0296
Achmore (near Loch Carron)	Highland	57.33°N 05.57°W	NG8533
Achnacarnin	Highland	58.23°N 05.34°W	NC0432
Achnacarry	Highland	56.93°N 05.00°W	NN1787
Achnacloich	Highland	57.10°N 05.98°W	NG5908
Achnacroish	Argyll and Bute	56.50°N 05.49°W	NM8540
Achnaha	Highland	56.73°N 06.15°W	NM4668
Achnahanat	Highland	57.94°N 04.51°W	NH5198
Achnahannet	Highland	57.32°N 03.71°W	NH9727
Achnahard	Argyll and Bute	56.32°N 06.22°W	NM3923
Achnahuaigh	Highland	58.54°N 04.44°W	NC5864
Achnairn	Highland	58.07°N 04.46°W	NC5512
Achnamara	Argyll and Bute	56.02°N 05.58°W	NR7787
Achnasheen	Highland	57.57°N 05.07°W	NH1658
Achosnich	Highland	56.72°N 06.18°W	NM4467
Achreamie	Highland	58.57°N 03.70°W	ND0166
Achriesgill	Highland	58.43°N 05.00°W	NC2554
Achrimsdale	Highland	58.03°N 03.86°W	NC9006
Achtalean	Highland	57.43°N 06.21°W	NG4746
Achterneed	Highland	57.59°N 04.54°W	NH4859
Achtoty	Highland	58.52°N 04.28°W	NC6762
Achurch	Northamptonshire	52.42°N 00.50°W	TL0282
Achuvoldrach	Highland	58.48°N 04.47°W	NC5658

=== Ack-Act ===
Location	Locality	Coordinates (links to map & photo sources)	OS grid reference
Ackenthwaite	Cumbria	54.22°N 02.76°W	SD5081
Ackergill	Highland	58.46°N 03.11°W	ND3553
Acklam	Middlesbrough	54.54°N 01.25°W	NZ4817
Acklam	North Yorkshire	54.03°N 00.81°W	SE7861
Ackleton	Shropshire	52.57°N 02.34°W	SO7798
Acklington	Northumberland	55.30°N 01.65°W	NU2201
Ackton	Wakefield	53.68°N 01.38°W	SE4121
Ackworth Moor Top	Wakefield	53.63°N 01.35°W	SE4316
Acle	Norfolk	52.63°N 01.54°E	TG4010
Acocks Green	Birmingham	52.44°N 01.83°W	SP1183
Acol	Kent	51.35°N 01.30°E	TR3067
Acomb	Northumberland	54.98°N 02.11°W	NY9366
Acomb	York	53.94°N 01.13°W	SE5750
Acre	Oldham	53.55°N 02.10°W	SD9306
Acrefair	Wrexham	52.97°N 03.08°W	SJ2743
Acres Nook	Staffordshire	53.07°N 02.24°W	SJ8453
Acton	Dorset	50.60°N 02.02°W	SY9878
Acton	Shropshire	52.44°N 03.01°W	SO3184
Acton	Worcestershire	52.30°N 02.23°W	SO8467
Acton	Suffolk	52.06°N 00.75°E	TL8944
Acton	Ealing	51.50°N 00.27°W	TQ2080
Acton	Wrexham	53.05°N 02.98°W	SJ3451
Acton	Staffordshire	52.96°N 02.26°W	SJ8241
Acton	Cheshire East	53.07°N 02.55°W	SJ6353
Acton Beauchamp	Herefordshire	52.14°N 02.48°W	SO6750
Acton Bridge	Cheshire West and Chester	53.27°N 02.61°W	SJ5975
Acton Burnell	Shropshire	52.60°N 02.69°W	SJ5301
Acton Green	Herefordshire	52.14°N 02.45°W	SO6950
Acton Green	Ealing	51.49°N 00.27°W	TQ2079
Acton Pigott	Shropshire	52.61°N 02.68°W	SJ5402
Acton Place	Suffolk	52.07°N 00.74°E	TL8845
Acton Reynald	Shropshire	52.80°N 02.69°W	SJ5323
Acton Round	Shropshire	52.55°N 02.54°W	SO6395
Acton Scott	Shropshire	52.49°N 02.81°W	SO4589
Acton Trussell	Staffordshire	52.75°N 02.10°W	SJ9318
Acton Turville	South Gloucestershire	51.51°N 02.28°W	ST8080

== Ad ==
Location	Locality	Coordinates (links to map & photo sources)	OS grid reference
Adabroc	Western Isles	58.48°N 06.24°W	NB5363
Adambrae	West Lothian	55.86°N 03.53°W	NT0465
Adam's Green	Dorset	50.86°N 02.65°W	ST5407
Adbaston	Staffordshire	52.84°N 02.35°W	SJ7627
Adber	Dorset	50.97°N 02.58°W	ST5920
Adbolton	Nottinghamshire	52.93°N 01.10°W	SK6038
Adderbury	Oxfordshire	52.01°N 01.31°W	SP4735
Adderley	Shropshire	52.94°N 02.50°W	SJ6639
Adderley Green	City of Stoke-on-Trent	52.99°N 02.13°W	SJ9144
Addiewell	West Lothian	55.84°N 03.61°W	NS9962
Addingham	Bradford	53.93°N 01.89°W	SE0749
Addingham Moorside	Bradford	53.91°N 01.89°W	SE0747
Addington	Cornwall	50.45°N 04.46°W	SX2565
Addington	Buckinghamshire	51.94°N 00.92°W	SP7428
Addington	Croydon	51.35°N 00.03°W	TQ3764
Addington	Kent	51.30°N 00.36°E	TQ6559
Addinston	Scottish Borders	55.76°N 02.76°W	NT5253
Addiscombe	Croydon	51.37°N 00.07°W	TQ3466
Addlestone	Surrey	51.36°N 00.50°W	TQ0464
Addlestonemoor	Surrey	51.37°N 00.50°W	TQ0465
Addlethorpe	Lincolnshire	53.18°N 00.30°E	TF5468
Adel	Leeds	53.84°N 01.59°W	SE2739
Adeney	Shropshire	52.75°N 02.44°W	SJ7018
Adeyfield	Hertfordshire	51.75°N 00.45°W	TL0707
Adfa	Powys	52.59°N 03.40°W	SJ0501
Adforton	Herefordshire	52.33°N 02.88°W	SO4071
Adgestone	Isle of Wight	50.66°N 01.16°W	SZ5985
Adisham	Kent	51.23°N 01.17°E	TR2253
Adlestrop	Gloucestershire	51.94°N 01.65°W	SP2427
Adlingfleet	East Riding of Yorkshire	53.67°N 00.72°W	SE8421
Adlington	Cheshire East	53.31°N 02.13°W	SJ9180
Adlington	Lancashire	53.61°N 02.60°W	SD6013
Adlington Park	Wigan	53.59°N 02.63°W	SD5811
Admaston	Shropshire	52.70°N 02.54°W	SJ6312
Admaston	Staffordshire	52.80°N 01.92°W	SK0523
Admington	Warwickshire	52.11°N 01.70°W	SP2046
Adpar	Carmarthenshire	52.04°N 04.48°W	SN3041
Adsborough	Somerset	51.05°N 03.04°W	ST2729
Adscombe	Somerset	51.12°N 03.17°W	ST1837
Adstock	Buckinghamshire	51.96°N 00.93°W	SP7330
Adstone	Northamptonshire	52.15°N 01.13°W	SP5951
Adswood	Stockport	53.38°N 02.18°W	SJ8888
Adversane	West Sussex	50.99°N 00.47°W	TQ0723
Advie	Highland	57.38°N 03.46°W	NJ1234
Adwalton	Leeds	53.74°N 01.65°W	SE2328
Adwell	Oxfordshire	51.68°N 01.00°W	SU6999
Adwick le Street	Doncaster	53.55°N 01.20°W	SE5307
Adwick upon Dearne	Doncaster	53.50°N 01.29°W	SE4701

== Ae ==
Location	Locality	Coordinates (links to map & photo sources)	OS grid reference
Ae	Dumfries and Galloway	55.18°N 03.60°W	NX9889

== Af ==
Location	Locality	Coordinates (links to map & photo sources)	OS grid reference
Affetside	Bury	53.61°N 02.37°W	SD7513
Affleck	Aberdeenshire	57.29°N 02.23°W	NJ8623
Affpuddle	Dorset	50.73°N 02.28°W	SY8093
Afon Eitha	Wrexham	52.99°N 03.05°W	SJ2945
Afon-wen	Flintshire	53.22°N 03.30°W	SJ1371
Afon Wen	Gwynedd	52.90°N 04.32°W	SH4437
Afton	Isle of Wight	50.67°N 01.52°W	SZ3486

== Ag ==
Location	Locality	Coordinates (links to map & photo sources)	OS grid reference
Agar Nook	Leicestershire	52.72°N 01.33°W	SK4514
Agbrigg	Wakefield	53.66°N 01.48°W	SE3419
Aggborough	Worcestershire	52.37°N 02.25°W	SO8375
Agglethorpe	North Yorkshire	54.27°N 01.87°W	SE0886
Aglionby	Cumbria	54.89°N 02.87°W	NY4456
Agneash	Isle of Man	54.24°N 04.41°W	SC4386

== Ai ==
Location	Locality	Coordinates (links to map & photo sources)	OS grid reference
Aifft	Denbighshire	53.21°N 03.33°W	SJ1169
Aigburth	Liverpool	53.36°N 02.93°W	SJ3886
Aike	East Riding of Yorkshire	53.89°N 00.41°W	TA0445
Aiketgate	Cumbria	54.80°N 02.81°W	NY4846
Aikton	Cumbria	54.86°N 03.13°W	NY2753
Ailby	Lincolnshire	53.26°N 00.14°E	TF4376
Ailsa Craig	South Ayrshire	55.25°N 05.11°W	NX020995
Ailstone	Warwickshire	52.14°N 01.70°W	SP2050
Ailsworth	Cambridgeshire	52.56°N 00.36°W	TL1198
Aimes Green	Essex	51.69°N 00.01°E	TL3902
Ainderby Quernhow	North Yorkshire	54.21°N 01.48°W	SE3480
Ainderby Steeple	North Yorkshire	54.32°N 01.49°W	SE3392
Aingers Green	Essex	51.83°N 01.06°E	TM1120
Ainley Top	Kirklees	53.66°N 01.83°W	SE1119
Ainsdale	Sefton	53.60°N 03.04°W	SD3112
Ainstable	Cumbria	54.80°N 02.73°W	NY5346
Ainsworth	Bury	53.58°N 02.36°W	SD7610
Ainthorpe	North Yorkshire	54.46°N 00.92°W	NZ7008
Aintree	Sefton	53.47°N 02.95°W	SJ3798
Airbles	North Lanarkshire	55.78°N 03.99°W	NS7556
Aird (Lewis)	Western Isles	58.23°N 06.15°W	NB5635
Aird (Benbecula)	Western Isles	57.46°N 07.40°W	NF7654
Aird Adhanais	Western Isles	57.84°N 06.68°W	NG2294
Aird a Mhachair	Western Isles	57.37°N 07.42°W	NF7445
Aird a' Mhulaidh	Western Isles	57.99°N 06.77°W	NB1810
Aird Asaig	Western Isles	57.91°N 06.84°W	NB1302
Aird Brenish	Western Isles	58.12°N 07.12°W	NA982266
Aird Choinnich	Western Isles	57.38°N 07.41°W	NF7546
Aird Dhail	Western Isles	58.46°N 06.34°W	NB4761
Airdens	Highland	57.90°N 04.33°W	NH6293
Aird Mhanais	Western Isles	57.79°N 06.86°W	NG111884
Aird Mhighe (Loch Stocanais)	Western Isles	57.82°N 06.85°W	NG1292
Aird Mhighe (Loch Fhionnsabhaigh)	Western Isles	57.77°N 06.91°W	NG0887
Aird Mhòr	Western Isles	57.38°N 07.34°W	NF7945
Aird na Monadh	Western Isles	57.38°N 07.37°W	NF7745
Aird nan Sruban	Western Isles	57.49°N 07.27°W	NF8457
Aird of Sleat	Highland	57.02°N 05.97°W	NG5900
Airdrie	North Lanarkshire	55.86°N 03.98°W	NS7665
Aird Ruairidh	Western Isles	57.16°N 07.39°W	NF7421
Aird Shleibhe	Western Isles	57.79°N 06.86°W	NG1189
Aird Thunga	Western Isles	58.23°N 06.32°W	NB4636
Airdtorrisdale	Highland	58.52°N 04.28°W	NC6762
Aird Uig	Western Isles	58.22°N 07.02°W	NB0537
Airedale	Wakefield	53.71°N 01.31°W	SE4525
Aire View	North Yorkshire	53.91°N 02.01°W	SD9946
Airidh a' Bhruaich	Western Isles	58.05°N 06.68°W	NB2417
Airlie	Angus	56.63°N 03.12°W	NO3150
Airmyn	East Riding of Yorkshire	53.71°N 00.91°W	SE7225
Airntully	Perth and Kinross	56.49°N 03.47°W	NO0935
Airor	Highland	57.07°N 05.78°W	NG7105
Airth	Falkirk	56.06°N 03.78°W	NS8987
Airthrey Castle	Stirling	56.14°N 03.91°W	NS8196
Airton	North Yorkshire	54.02°N 02.15°W	SD9059
Airy Hill	North Yorkshire	54.46°N 00.62°W	NZ8909
Aisby (South Kesteven)	Lincolnshire	52.93°N 00.49°W	TF0138
Aisby (West Lindsey)	Lincolnshire	53.41°N 00.69°W	SK8792
Aisgernis	Western Isles	57.19°N 07.39°W	NF7424
Aish (South Brent)	Devon	50.42°N 03.84°W	SX6960
Aish (Stoke Gabriel)	Devon	50.41°N 03.63°W	SX8458
Aisholt	Somerset	51.10°N 03.15°W	ST1935
Aiskew	North Yorkshire	54.28°N 01.58°W	SE2788
Aislaby (Ryedale)	North Yorkshire	54.25°N 00.81°W	SE7785
Aislaby (Scarborough)	North Yorkshire	54.46°N 00.69°W	NZ8508
Aislaby	Stockton-on-Tees	54.50°N 01.38°W	NZ4012
Aismunderby	North Yorkshire	54.11°N 01.53°W	SE3068
Aisthorpe	Lincolnshire	53.30°N 00.59°W	SK9480
Aith	Shetland Islands	60.27°N 01.38°W	HU3455
Aithnen	Powys	52.78°N 03.18°W	SJ2022
Aithsetter	Shetland Islands	60.05°N 01.21°W	HU4430

== Ak ==
Location	Locality	Coordinates (links to map & photo sources)	OS grid reference
Akeld	Northumberland	55.55°N 02.08°W	NT9529
Akeley	Buckinghamshire	52.02°N 00.98°W	SP7037
Akenham	Suffolk	52.08°N 01.12°E	TM1448
