= Aish =

Aish may refer to:

== People ==
- Aishwarya Rai (born 1973), an Indian actress
- James Aish (born 1995), an Australian rules footballer
- Michael Aish (disambiguation), multiple persons
- Nicole Aish

== Places ==
- Aish, South Brent, England
- Aish, Stoke Gabriel, England
- Aish Tor, Dartmoor, England

== Other ==
- Aish HaTorah, Orthodox Jewish outreach organization and yeshiva
- Assured Income for the Severely Handicapped, social welfare program in Alberta, Canada
