= Abbey Gate =

Abbey Gate may refer to:

- Abbey Gate, Devon, a village near Axminster in Devon, England
- Abbey Gate, Kent, a village near Sandling in Kent, England
- Abbey Gate (Sorø), a gate of Sorø Abbey in Sorø, Denmark
- Abbeygate Shopping Centre, Nuneaton, Warwickshire, England
- Abbey Gate, one of the gates of Kabul International Airport in Kabul, Afghanistan
  - A reference to the scene of a terrorist attack on August 26, 2021

== See also ==
- Abbey Gate College, in Cheshire county (England)
- Abbey Gateway (disambiguation)
