= Abbotswood =

Abbotswood or Abbot's Wood may refer to any of several locations in the UK:

- Abbotswood, Hampshire, a village
- Abbotswood, Gloucestershire, a country house and estate
- Abbotswood, Surrey, a village
- Abbotswood, Yate, a suburb
- Abbot's Wood, Cumbria, a former country estate near Barrow-in-Furness
