= Achmore =

Achmore or Acha Mòr may refer to three places in Scotland in the United Kingdom:

- Achmore, Highland, a hamlet near Loch Carron
- Achmore, Lewis, a village on the Isle of Lewis; Acha Mòr on some maps
- Achmore, Ullapool, a hamlet on the Scoraig peninsula near Ullapool

== See also ==
- Achiemore (disambiguation)
