= Romsey Extra =

Former civil parish in Hampshire, England

Coordinates: 50.978°N 1.501°W

- Broadlands House in 1980

- Location within Hampshire
- Population: 3,276 (2011 census)
- Civil parish: Romsey; Awbridge
- District: Test Valley
- Shire county: Hampshire
- Region: South East
- Country: England
- Sovereign state: United Kingdom

Romsey Extra was a civil parish in the Borough of Test Valley and the English county of Hampshire. At the 2011 census, it had a population of 3,276, although due to the ongoing 800 home Abbotswood development that begun after the census was taken, it was likely to have risen significantly by the next Census and by 50% between 2012 and 2018. In 2014 there was a proposal for a new 1300 home development at Whitenap.

The parish surrounded the town of Romsey and included the villages of Abbotswood, Ashfield, Lee, Crampmoor and Shootash as well as the Broadlands estate.

Romsey Extra civil parish was formed in 1866 from the area of Romsey parish outside the municipal borough. Its council was formed in 1894. On 1 April 2023 the parish council was abolished and most of its area transferred to Romsey parish; the Stanbridge Earls area became part of Awbridge parish.
