= Aisby =

Aisby may refer to:

- Aisby, South Kesteven, Lincolnshire
- Aisby, West Lindsey, Lincolnshire
