= Lee, Hampshire =

Hamlet in Hampshire, England

Coordinates: 50.958834°N 1.486989°W

Lee
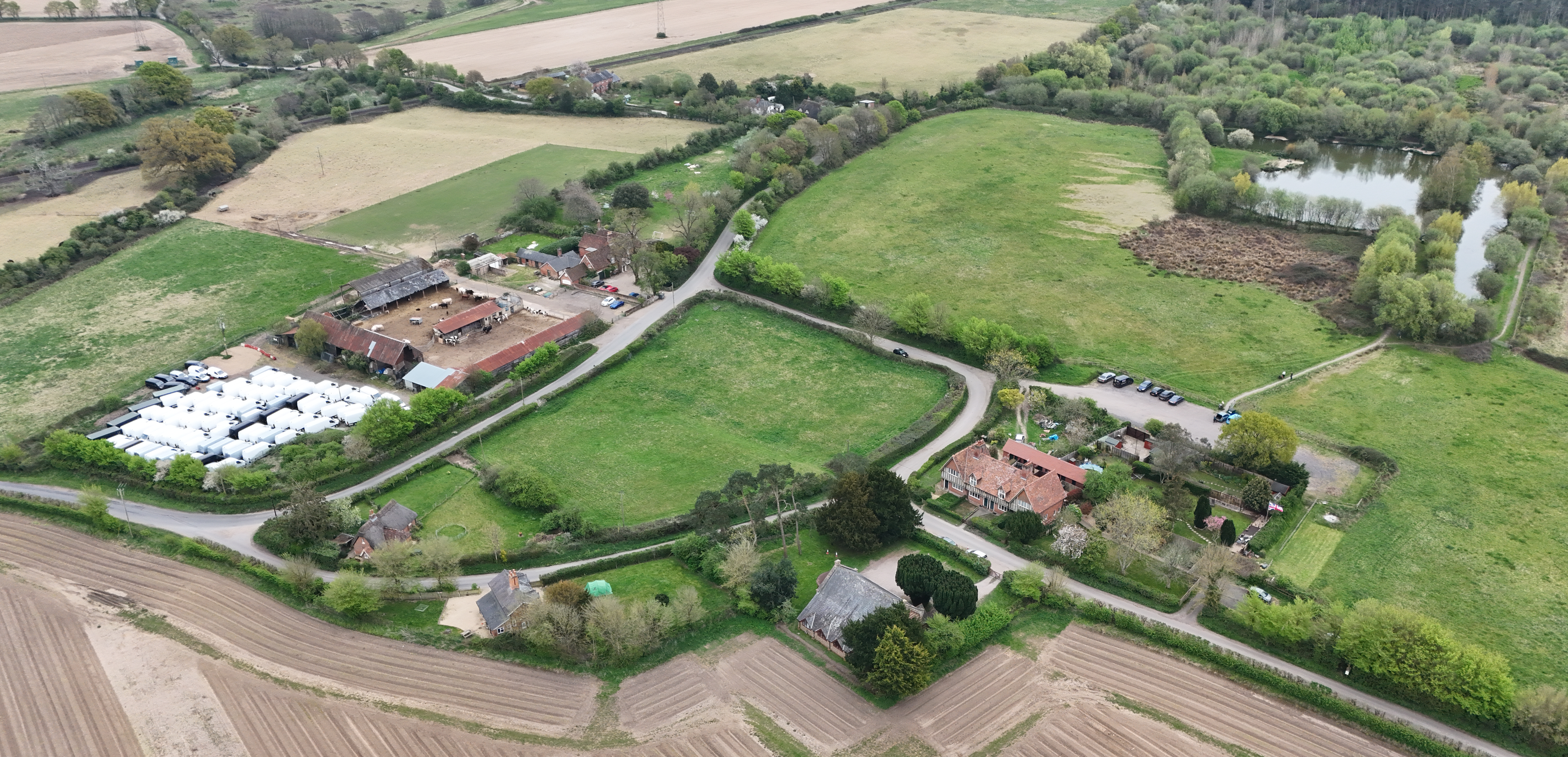
- Lee from the air

- Location within Hampshire
- OS grid reference: SU3612717837
- Civil parish: Romsey
- District: Test Valley
- Shire county: Hampshire
- Region: South East
- Country: England
- Sovereign state: United Kingdom
- Post town: ROMSEY
- Postcode district: SO51 9
- Dialling code: 01962
- Police: Hampshire and Isle of Wight
- Fire: Hampshire and Isle of Wight
- Ambulance: South Central
- UK Parliament: Romsey and Southampton North

Lee is a hamlet in Romsey civil parish in the Test Valley district of Hampshire, England. It was in Romsey Extra civil parish before its abolition. Its nearest town is Romsey, which is approximately 2 miles (3 km) north of the hamlet. Lee is home to the Mountbatten Gallery previously Lee church built in 1862. The building's life as a gallery began in 1979. Across the road from the gallery are estate cottages designed by William Eden Nesfield dating from 1869.
