= Kirkton, Livingston =

Small area in the north-west of Livingston in West Lothian, Scotland

Coordinates: 55.8808°N 3.5365°W

Kirkton: Scots: Kirktoun
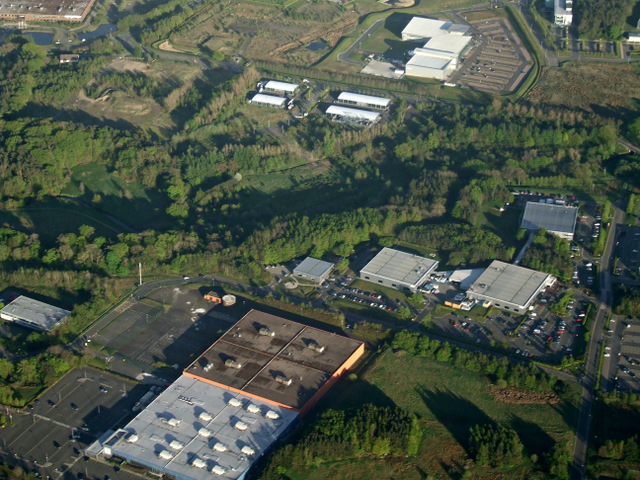
- Part of Kirkton Campus seen from the air
- Council area: West Lothian
- Lieutenancy area: West Lothian
- Country: Scotland
- Sovereign state: United Kingdom
- Post town: LIVINGSTON
- Postcode district: EH54
- Dialling code: 01506
- Police: Scotland
- Fire: Scottish
- Ambulance: Scottish
- UK Parliament: Livingston
- Scottish Parliament: Almond Valley; Lothian

Kirkton (Scots: Kirktoun) is a small area in the north-west of Livingston in West Lothian, Scotland. The area is mainly occupied by an industrial estate, as well as by some residential housing areas. The Killandean burn, a small stream runs through the area.

== History ==
Much of the area of Kirkton belonged to the estate of nearby Charlesfield House, dating to 1795 and demolished in the early 20th century. Some of the gardens and forested parts of the estate remain beside the Killandean burn. The first owner of the house was Thomas Hardy, a minister. The estate passed to his son, Captain William Hardy, an officer in the East India Company who died in 1824. The lands then passed to his brother Thomas Hardy, FRCS a surgeon, who died in 1836. The estate was then leased by trustees to Thomas Robertson Chaplin, before it was sold to Henry Raeburn Jnr, the son of the distinguished painter Sir Henry Raeburn. The estate and lands then passed through his descendants until the 1960s when acquired by the Livingston Development Corporation.

== Geography ==
Kirkton is located to the south-west of Livingston Village, to the west of Livingston Centre and to the north of Adambrae. The River Almond flows through Kirkton and is joined by the Kileandean burn which also flows through Kirkton. The Kirkton weir is a two-metre-high structure originally built to power the nearby mill in Livingston village that was altered in 2017 to include a fish pass.

== Kirkton Campus ==
Kirkton was the site of Scotland's first designed high-technology industrial park known as 'Kirkton Campus'. The site was spread over some 300 acres. The technology park was centered along either side of Simpson Parkway, a curving road near the Killandean Burn. Notable companies and buildings include Ethicon (1978), Boehringer (1982), W. L. Gore & Associates (1984), Seagate Micro Electronics (1986), Canon Business Machines (1989) and Logic (1994). Many of the original technology companies have disappeared and new companies occupy some of the former buildings.

=== Hospital ===
In November 2021, a £5 million private medical hospital opened in Kirkton campus, operated by Cosmedicare UK. The building had previously housed several companies including Glenmorangie, Gore, Quintiles and BskyB.

== Community facilities ==
A crematorium is located in the north-west part of Kirkton that opened in 2010.

There is a large, historic park located in Kirkton.
