= Ashfield, Hampshire =

Hamlet in Hampshire, England

Coordinates: 50.96°N 01.48°W

Ashfield
- Location within Hampshire
- OS grid reference: SU3619
- Civil parish: Romsey
- District: Test Valley
- Shire county: Hampshire
- Region: South East
- Country: England
- Sovereign state: United Kingdom
- Post town: ROMSEY
- Postcode district: SO51
- Police: Hampshire and Isle of Wight
- Fire: Hampshire and Isle of Wight
- Ambulance: South Central
- UK Parliament: Romsey and Southampton North

Ashfield is a hamlet in the Test Valley district of Hampshire, England. It lies 1.6 miles (2.5 km) south-east from Romsey, its nearest town. It is in the civil parish of Romsey Extra.
