= Crampmoor =

Village and parish in Hampshire, England

Coordinates: 50.997990°N 1.461465°W

- St Swithun's Church, Crampmoor

- Location within Hampshire
- OS grid reference: SU3788822204
- District: Test Valley
- Shire county: Hampshire
- Region: South East
- Country: England
- Sovereign state: United Kingdom
- Post town: ROMSEY
- Postcode district: SO51
- Dialling code: 01794
- Police: Hampshire and Isle of Wight
- Fire: Hampshire and Isle of Wight
- Ambulance: South Central
- UK Parliament: Winchester

Crampmoor is a village and civil parish in the Test Valley district of Hampshire, England. It is in the civil parish of Romsey Extra. Its nearest town is Romsey, which lies approximately 2 miles (3.1 km) west from the village.

There was no local church in Crampmoor and church services were held in large room in James Feltham’s house at New Pond. In 1858 Caroline Rolfe of New Pond and her sister-in-law Jane Feltham, also of New Pond and Caroline Suckling of Highwood House, all equally donated the funds to build a combined St Swithun's church and school room which was completed in 1859.
