= Nant-y-Ffrith =

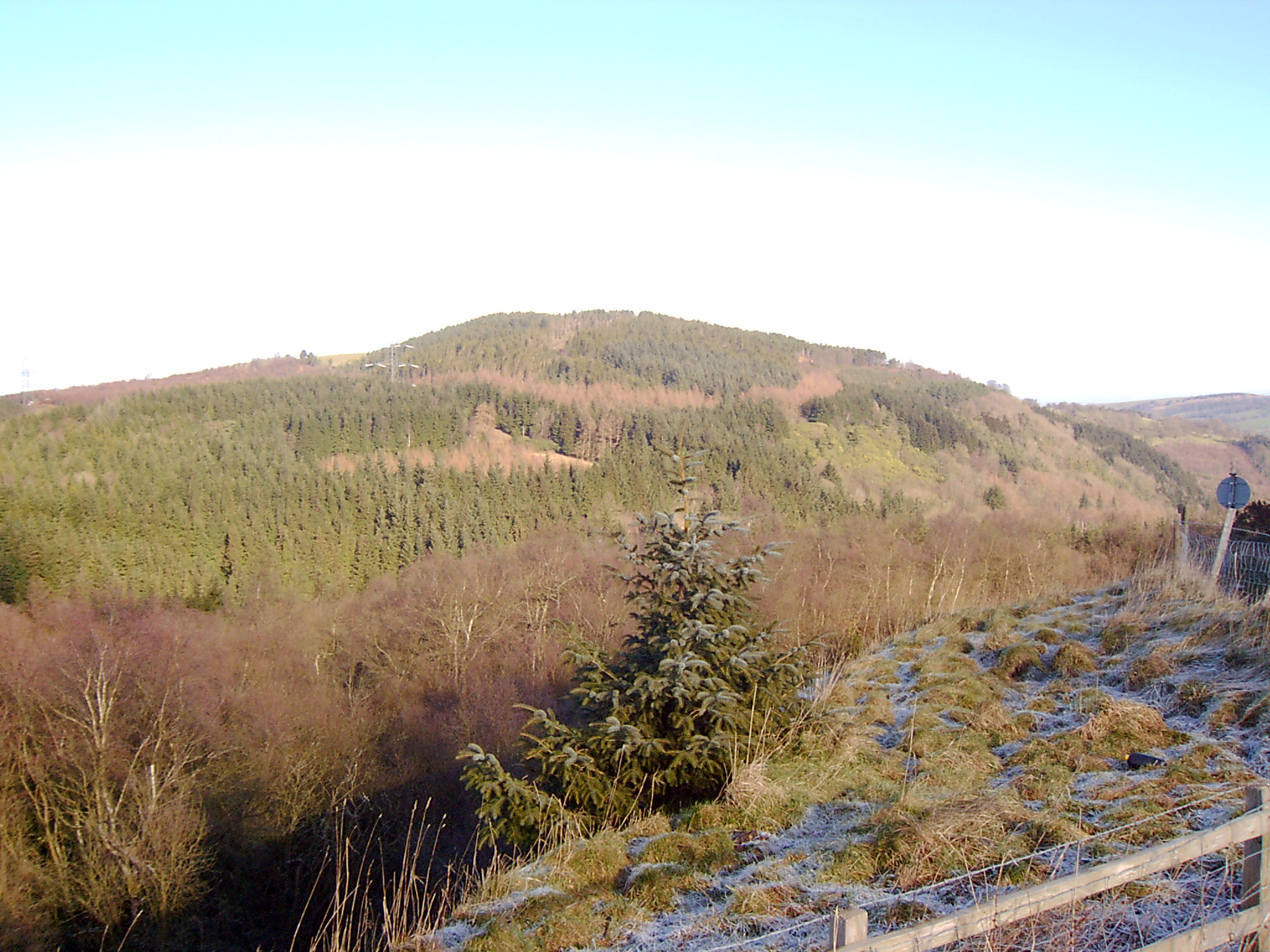
View over Nant-y-Ffrith woods from Bwlchgwyn.

Nant-y-Ffrith refers to a stream and the wooded valley through which it flows on the border between Flintshire and Wrexham County Borough in Wales. The stream begins in moorland to the east of Llandegla. It passes Bwlchgwyn village before entering a rather steep-sided, rocky valley. It passes under the viaduct of a disused railway line before joining the River Cegidog at Ffrith.

The woodlands contain some deciduous trees but are dominated by recent conifer plantations planted by the Forestry Commission after the second world war. They contain a range of flora and fauna including various ferns and mosses and woodland birds such as wood warbler and redstart. During the 1950s, people travelled from miles around to park their cars on the Drofa (or hair-pin bend in English) overlooking Nant-y-Ffrith, and listen to nightingales, whose song echoed in the valley.

There are several abandoned silica quarries and lead mines in the area. Lead mining may have begun as early as Roman times and has left a number of caves.

== Pre-Roman/Celtic Activity ==
The mountain on the Flintshire side of Nant-y-Ffrith in modern Welsh is called the Penllyn. Pen in Welsh literally means 'head' and is often used to describe a notable high point, a pinnacle. The name has its origins in ancient history. The Brythonic precursor to modern day Welsh used the word across Britain's landscape: 'Penmaenmawr', 'Penmachno' and the 'Pennines' in the Lake District. The ancient Welsh using the word to describe the mountain ties with evidence of roundhouse foundations discovered on the Penllyn sometime during the 1960-70s. There are also other pointers to ancient Welsh history on the mountain in its name. On older maps there are variations of a full name, 'Pen llun y gwr' and 'Pen llan y gwr'.

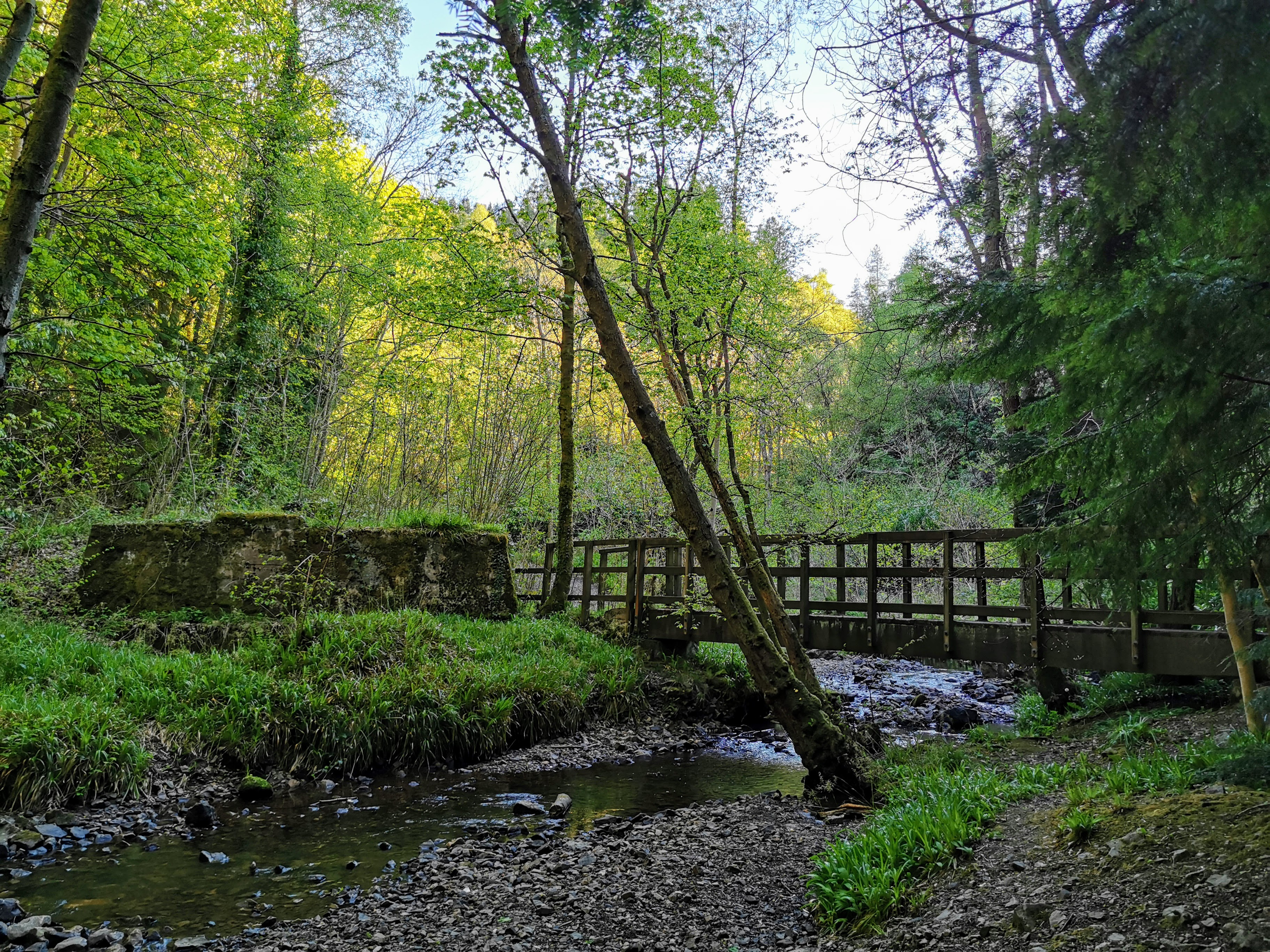
Footbridge crossing the stream

The word 'gwr' at the end is interesting, meaning 'man' maybe an elder or leader in this context. 'Gwr' also appears in the nearby village of Caergwrle. The inclusion of 'gwr' in the hillfort's name may have provided a differentiation for the ancient Welsh with other nearby hillforts, Pen llan y gwr perhaps having been a seat of tribal governance or set up by an older generation. The closest high point across the valley in the village of Bwlchgwyn is the edge of a quarry where Fronheulog Hall once stood. This site, lower than the Penllyn, was the site of a Brythonic hill fort before it was quarried away in the 19th century. Being in such close proximity, both hillforts are likely to have been built by the same people. The 'llan' of this elder or tribe leader is unlikely to have referred to a 'church' or 'parish', as in modern day Welsh, and is more likely to be an abbreviation of the Welsh word 'llanerch', a woodland clearing. That would certainly fit with the tree clearing required to build of a hill fort. 'Llyn' in the current day Penllyn, meaning lake is an unlikely candidate as is 'llun', meaning picture, which is to be found on some maps.

== Nant-y-Ffrith Hall ==
Nant-y-Ffrith Hall was originally built as a hunting lodge in 1850. Successive owners enlarged the building and created landscaped gardens. An open day and garden party was held each year for local villagers. The hall gradually fell into disrepair; it was used for ammunition storage in the Second World War and finally demolished between 1947 and 1950. The only signs of it today are a clearing in the woods, scattered stones and some exotic vegetation such as rhododendrons.

== Nant-y-Ffrith Waterfall ==
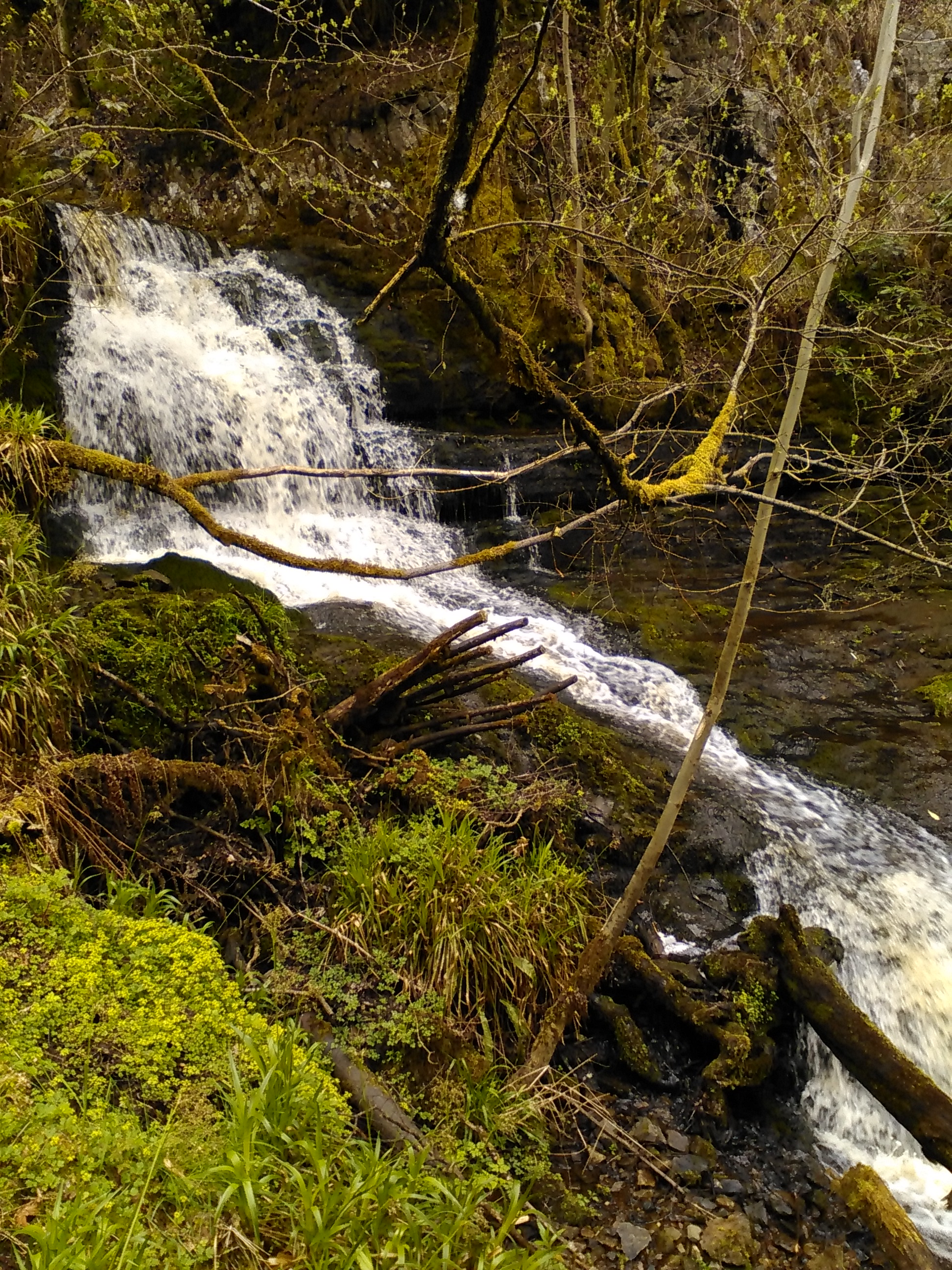
Nant-yFfrith waterfall middle tier

Roughly halfway down the gorge, approximately 100m upstream of a small wooden footbridge that crosses the stream, there is a large four-tier cascade waterfall hidden amongst the trees. The waterfall is approximately 15m in total height, with the final drop being between 4-5m high. It is the largest in the Flintshire / Wrexham area, the nearest other sizable waterfall being Dyserth falls in Denbighshire.

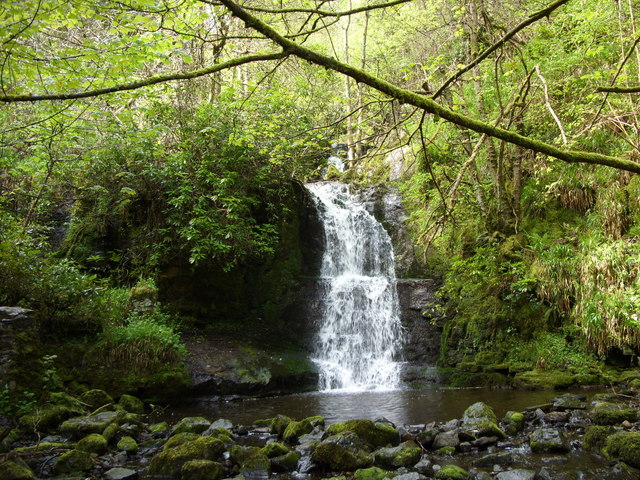
The lower tier of Nant-y-Ffrith waterfall

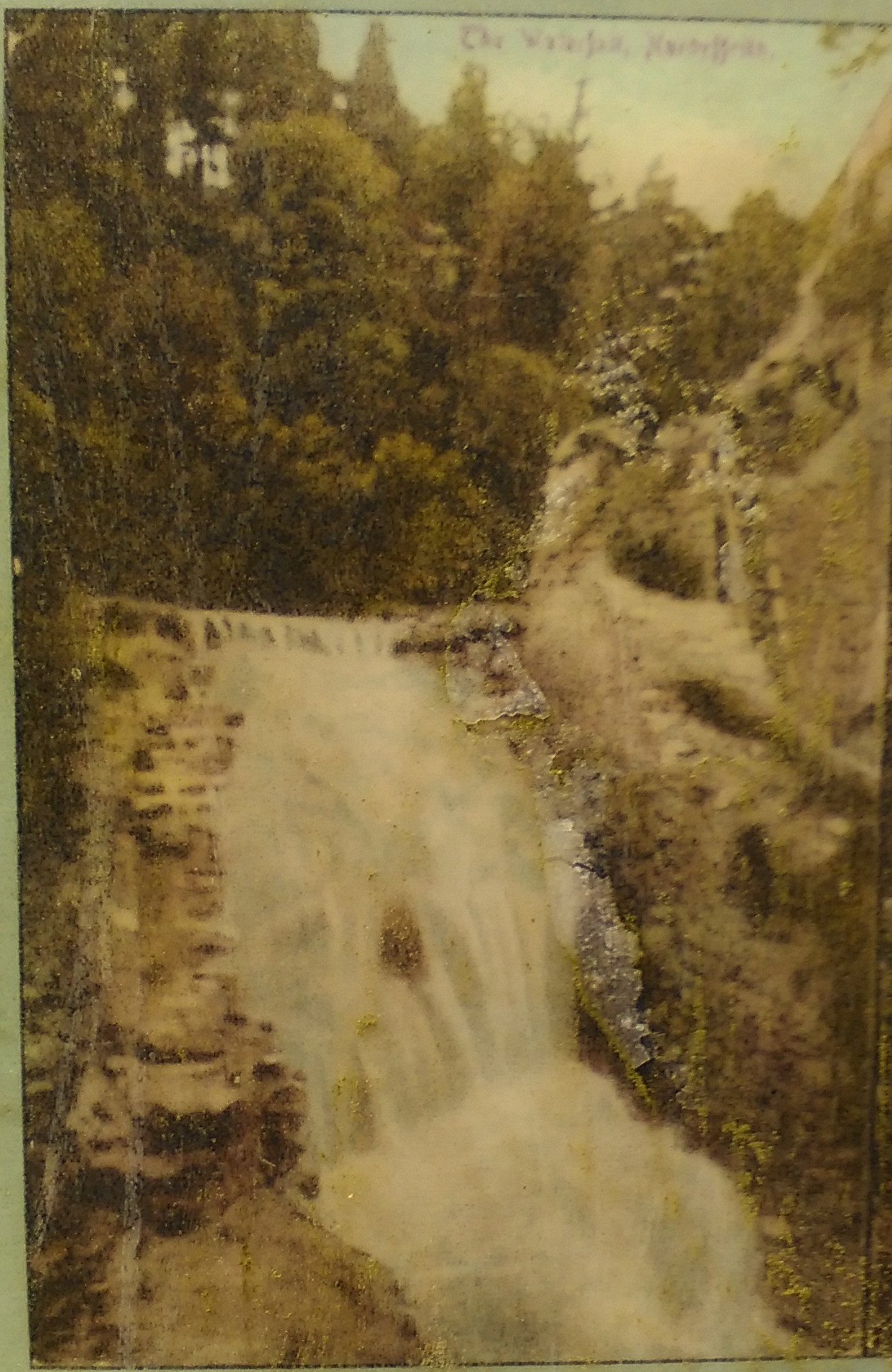
The upper tier of the falls circa 1900, showing the steps on the right-hand side.

Despite the waterfall's size and significance, access is poor and public information is very limited. Access to the bottom of the falls is from a small path on the south side of the valley accessed about 20m upstream from the wooden footbridge. Access to the top of the falls is from a bend in the forestry track next to a sign warning of steep and dangerous ground. Both paths are steep, uneven and slippery.

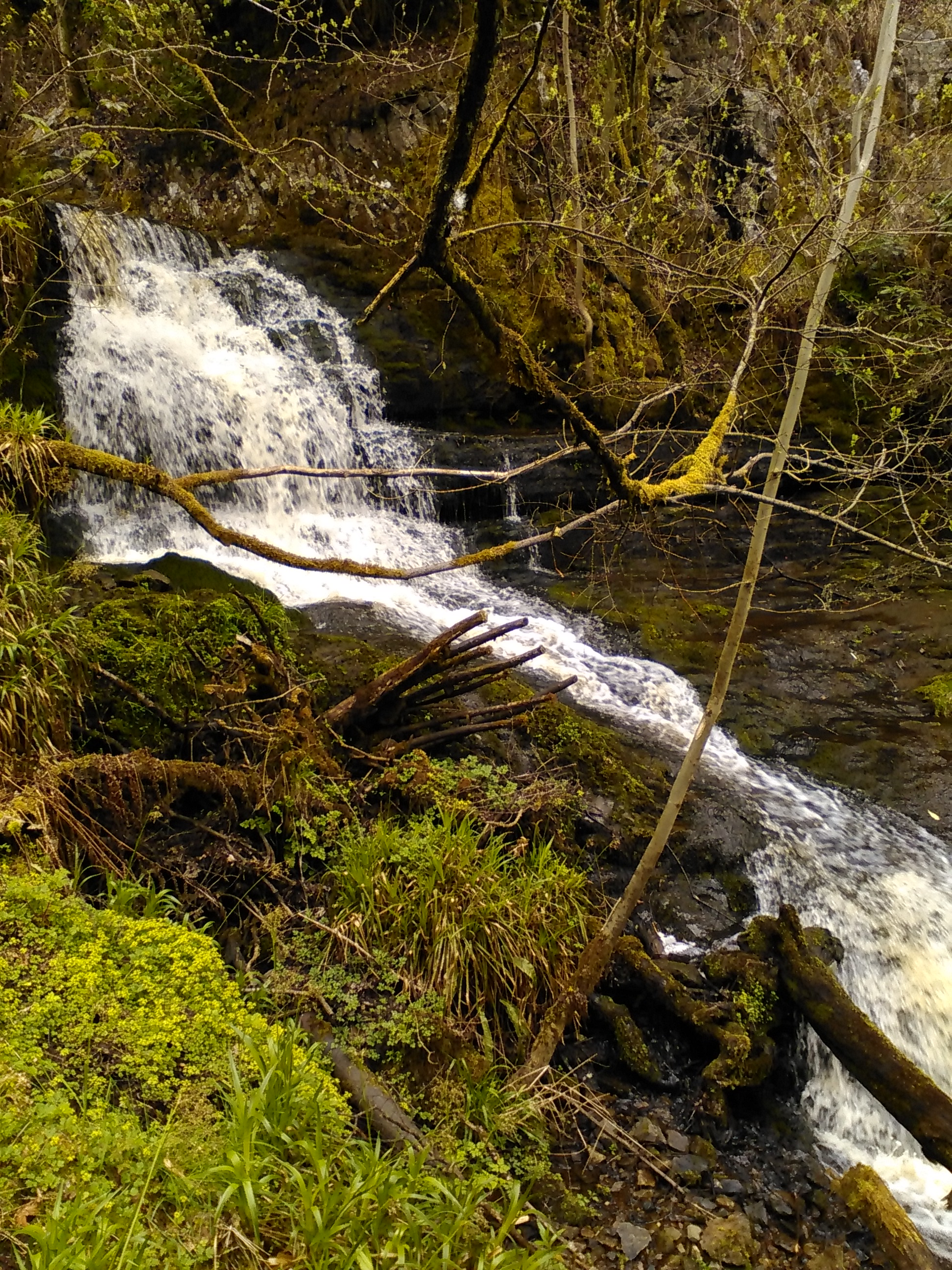
The middle section of the waterfall

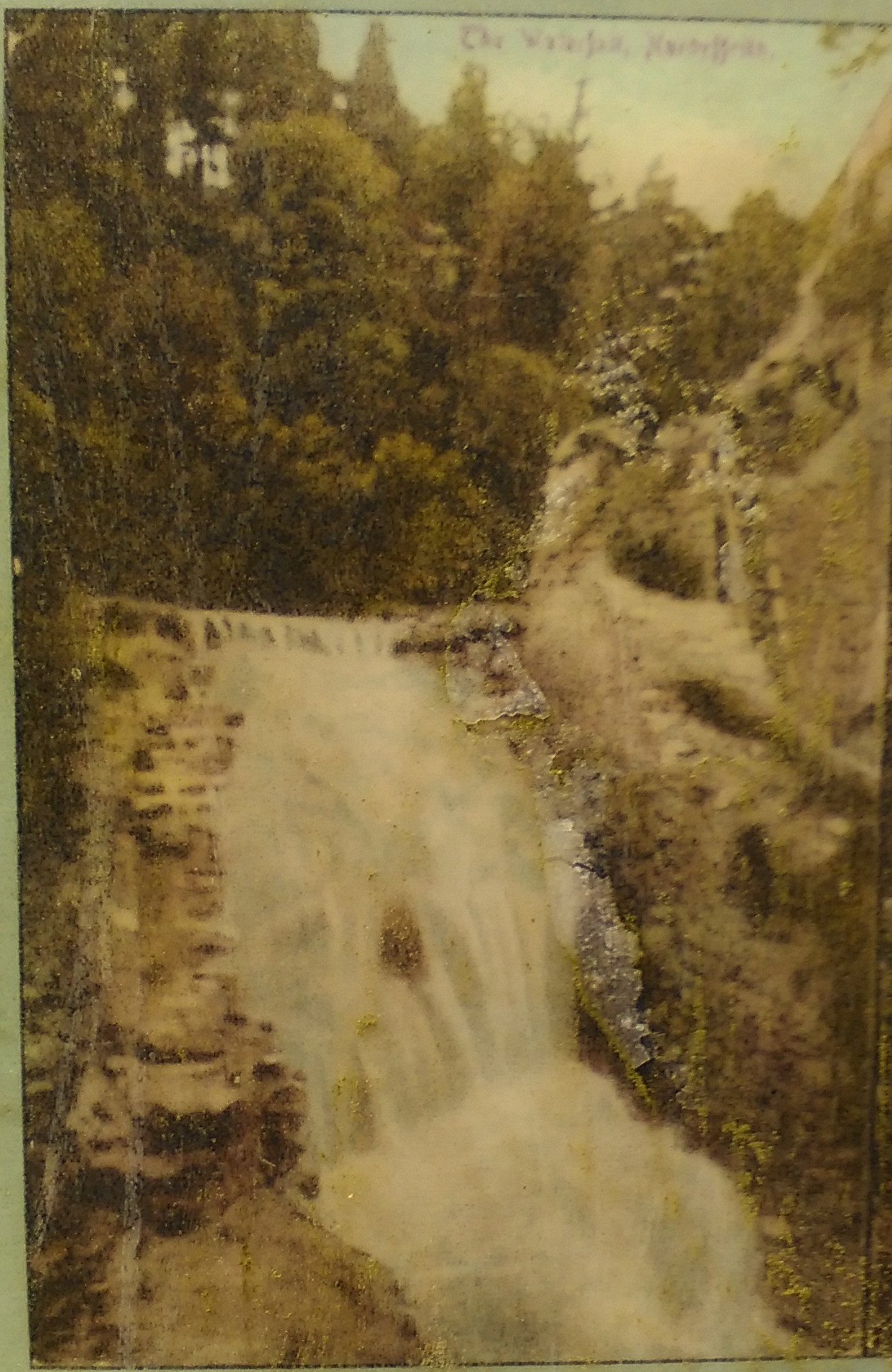
Upper tier photographed around 1900

During the heyday of Nant-y-Ffrith Hall in the second half of the 19th century steps were built up the rocks on the north side of the falls allowing viewing and access to all parts of the falls. Unfortunately, like the hall, the gardens and these steps fell into disrepair and they are no longer present, except for one section just below Wedding Cave, alongside the artificial section of the waterfall.

== Nant-y-Ffrith Reservoir ==
Nant-y-Ffrith Reservoir
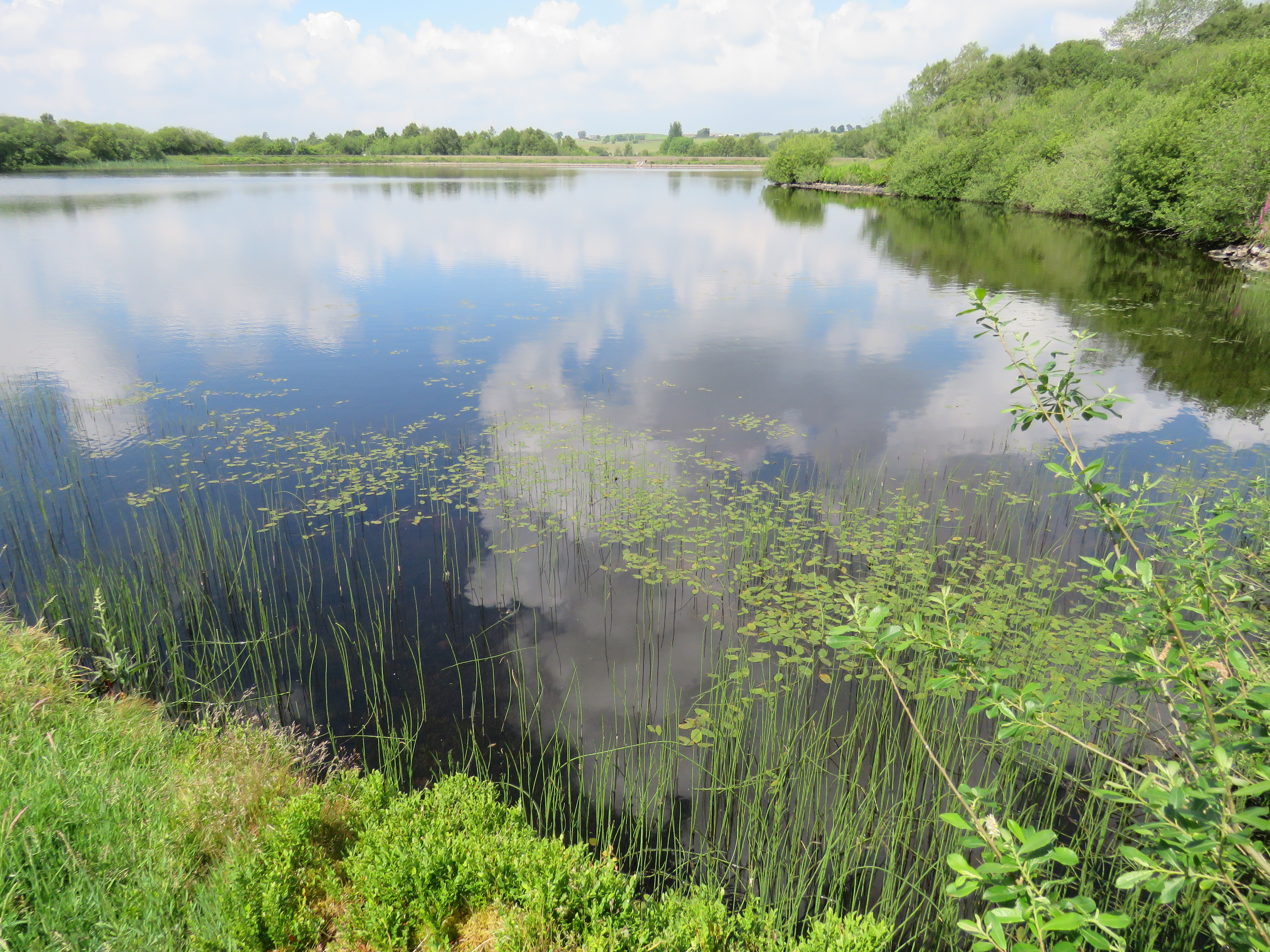

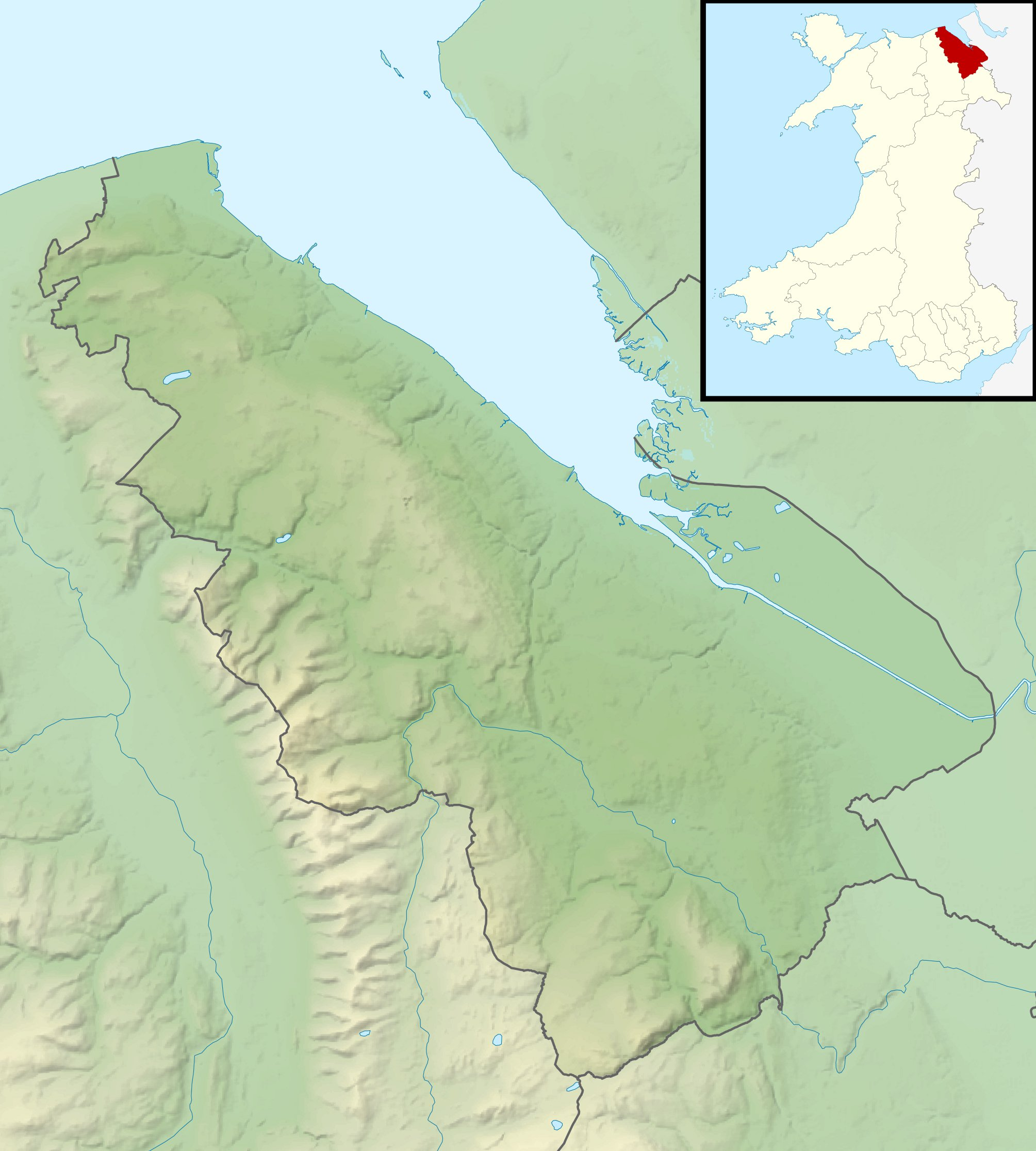
- Location within Flintshire
- Location: Wales
- Coordinates: 53°4′11″N 3°7′52″W
- Type: reservoir
- Primary inflows: Nant-y-Ffrith
- Primary outflows: Nant-y-Ffrith
- Basin countries: United Kingdom

This is a small reservoir near the source of the stream. It provides water to the villages to the west of Wrexham. Work began on it in October 1868 and it was supplying water by February 1871. It was built by Brymbo Water Company and is now owned by Hafren Dyfrdwy.

Breeding birds on the reservoir include great crested grebe and coot with sedge warbler and reed bunting in the surrounding vegetation and lapwing and curlew in nearby fields. Many common toads return to the reservoir in their breeding season.

== Sources ==
- Clwyd Bird Recording Group (various years) Clwyd Bird Report.
- R. J. Jones (1957) Maes Maelor, Gwasg John Penry, Swansea.
- Raymond Lowe (2002) Lost Houses in and around Wrexham, Landmark Publishing, Ashbourne.
