= Aberoer =

Village in Wales

Coordinates: 53.0335°N 3.06744737°W

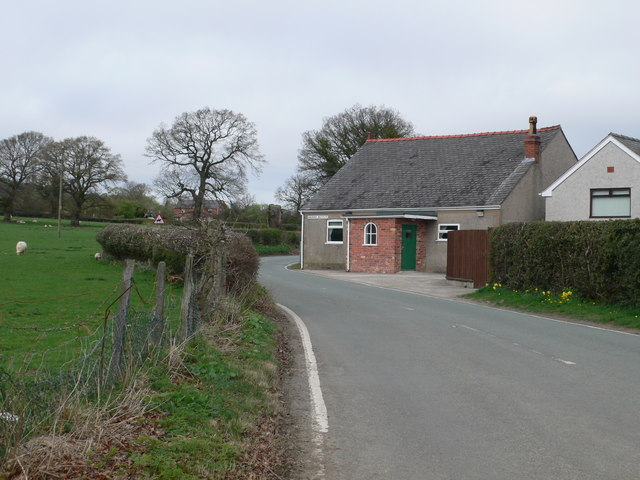
- The Aberoer Institute, a village hall.

- Location within Wrexham
- OS grid reference: SJ 2851 4900
- Community: Esclusham
- Principal area: Wrexham
- Preserved county: Clwyd
- Country: Wales
- Sovereign state: United Kingdom
- Post town: WREXHAM
- Postcode district: LL14
- Dialling code: 01978
- Police: North Wales
- Fire: North Wales
- Ambulance: Welsh
- UK Parliament: Clwyd South
- Senedd Cymru – Welsh Parliament: Clwyd South

Aberoer or Aber-oer (Welsh: [abɛrˈɔɨr]) is a scattered settlement in Wrexham County Borough, Wales; prior to 1974 it was in Denbighshire. It is part of the community area of Esclusham, and is situated on the rural slopes of Esclusham Mountain above Rhostyllen. The placename can be translated from the Welsh language as "[the] cold stream".

There was once a small colliery at Aberoer, working some of the lowest coals in the Middle Coal Measures, though few records remain of it.
