= Abbey Head =

Headland on the Solway Firth coast of Dumfries and Galloway, Scotland

Coordinates: 54.77°N 3.96°W

- Location within Dumfries and Galloway
- OS grid reference: NX74194436
  - London: 277 mi (446 km) SE
- Council area: Dumfries and Galloway
- Lieutenancy area: Kirkcudbrightshire
- Country: Scotland
- Sovereign state: United Kingdom
- Dialling code: 01387
- Police: Scotland
- Fire: Scottish
- Ambulance: Scottish
- UK Parliament: Dumfries and Galloway
- Scottish Parliament: Galloway and West Dumfries

Abbey Head is a headland on the Solway Firth coast of Dumfries and Galloway.
