= Airntully =

Coordinates: 56.501995°N 3.466931°W

Airntully: Scottish Gaelic: Àird an Tulaich
- Location within Perth and Kinross
- OS grid reference: NO098354
- Council area: Perth and Kinross
- Lieutenancy area: Perth and Kinross
- Country: Scotland
- Sovereign state: United Kingdom
- Post town: PERTH
- Postcode district: PH1
- Dialling code: 01738
- Police: Scotland
- Fire: Scottish
- Ambulance: Scottish
- UK Parliament: Angus and Perthshire Glens
- Scottish Parliament: Perth Mid Scotland and Fife

Airntully (/ɛərnˈtʌli/) is a hamlet in the Scottish council area of Perth and Kinross, which is to the west of the River Tay, 8 miles (11 km) north of Perth. In the 18th Century, it thrived on cottage weaving. The anonymous writer of the Statistical Account of the Parish of Kinclaven in the 1790s was impressed by the state of the village, commenting that "The county of Perth, were it possessed of no other spot of a similar description, should allow Arntully [sic] to remain in its present state, that a proper contrast might be drawn, between a neat modern village, and one upon the old construction." It retains a relatively unspoilt charm today.

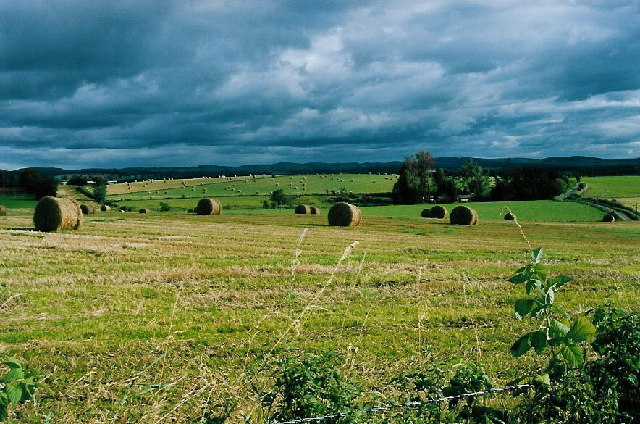
Looking south from Airntully
