= Achiemore =

Achiemore is the name of several places in Sutherland in Scotland:

- Achiemore, Durness, near Durness, on the road to Cape Wrath
- Achiemore, Strath Halladale, in Strath Halladale, between Forsinard and Melvich
