= Achtoty =

Coordinates: 58.532°N 4.283°W

Achtoty: Scottish Gaelic: Achadh Toitidh
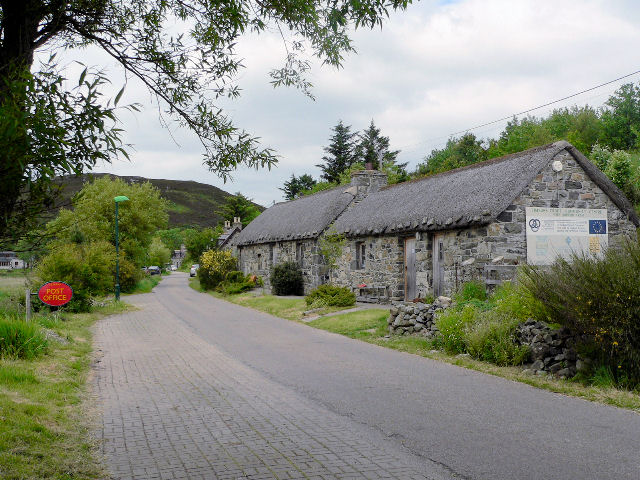
- Post Office at Airdtorrisdale, by Achtoty

- Location within the Highland council area
- OS grid reference: NC672627
- Council area: Highland
- Lieutenancy area: Sutherland
- Country: Scotland
- Sovereign state: United Kingdom
- Police: Scotland
- Fire: Scottish
- Ambulance: Scottish
- UK Parliament: Caithness, Sutherland and Easter Ross
- Scottish Parliament: Caithness, Sutherland and Ross

Achtoty (Scottish Gaelic: Achadh Toitidh) is a remote hamlet in the Scottish Highland Council area. Achtoty is about 26 miles (42 km) west of Thurso.
