= Aithnen =

Coordinates: 52.78°N 03.18°W

Aithnen: Welsh: Aethnen
- Location within Powys
- OS grid reference: SJ2022
- Principal area: Powys
- Preserved county: Powys
- Country: Wales
- Sovereign state: United Kingdom
- Police: Dyfed-Powys
- Fire: Mid and West Wales
- Ambulance: Welsh
- UK Parliament: Montgomeryshire and Glyndŵr

Aithnen (Welsh: Aethnen) is a small settlement in Powys, Wales. It is 10 kilometres (6 mi) southwest of the town of Oswestry.
