= Achavandra Muir =

Coordinates: 57.91°N 4.07°W

Achavandra Muir: Scottish Gaelic: Achadh Anndra
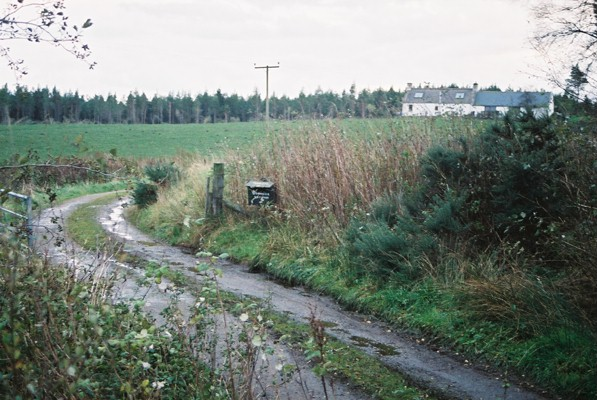

- Location within the Sutherland area
- OS grid reference: NH7793
- Council area: Highland
- Country: Scotland
- Sovereign state: United Kingdom
- Police: Scotland
- Fire: Scottish
- Ambulance: Scottish

Achavandra Muir (Scottish Gaelic: Achadh Anndra - Andrew's Field) is a hamlet in the Scottish Highlands in northeastern Scotland, about 7 kilometres from the coast. It lies just off the A9 between Dornoch and Loch Fleet. The land in the area is dominated by bog and crofting.

Historically, Achavandra Muir was occupied by Father John Sutherland, who died on 23 January 1910. In 1812 there were a reported twenty settlers in Achavandra Muir.

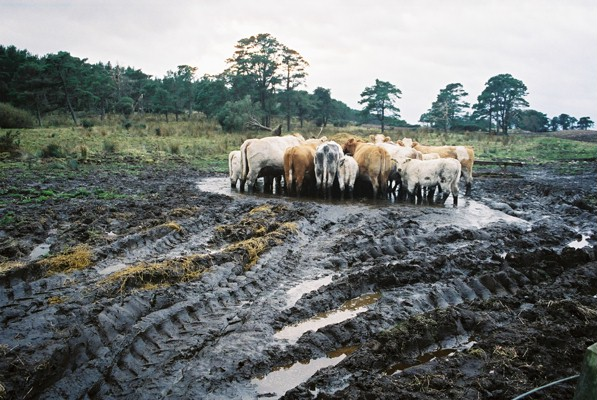
Boggy farm
