= Michael Aish =

Michael Aish may refer to:

- Michael Aish (athlete) (born 1976), New Zealand long-distance runner
- Michael Aish (footballer) (born 1961), Australian rules footballer
