= Achnacarnin =

Coordinates: 58.23336°N 5.33616°W

Achnacarnin: Scottish Gaelic: Achadh nan Càrnan
- Location within the Sutherland area
- OS grid reference: NC042320
- Council area: Highland
- Country: Scotland
- Sovereign state: United Kingdom
- Postcode district: IV27 4
- Police: Scotland
- Fire: Scottish
- Ambulance: Scottish
- UK Parliament: Caithness, Sutherland and Easter Ross
- Scottish Parliament: Caithness, Sutherland and Ross

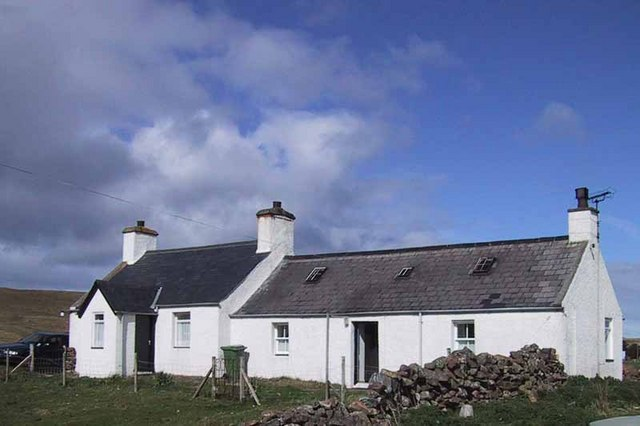
Old Schoolhouse, Culkein

Achnacarnin (Scottish Gaelic: Achadh nan Càrnan) is a village on the headland of Point of Stoer in Lairg, Sutherland, within the Scottish local authority area of the Highland Council.
