= Aire View =

Linear settlement in Cononley, North Yorkshire, England

Coordinates: 53.916°N 2.015°W

- Location within North Yorkshire
- OS grid reference: SD991466
- Unitary authority: North Yorkshire
- Ceremonial county: North Yorkshire
- Region: Yorkshire and the Humber
- Country: England
- Sovereign state: United Kingdom
- Post town: KEIGHLEY
- Postcode district: BD20 8
- Police: North Yorkshire
- Fire: North Yorkshire
- Ambulance: Yorkshire
- UK Parliament: Skipton and Ripon

Aire View is a linear settlement in the civil parish of Cononley, North Yorkshire, England. It lies 5 miles (8 km) north-west from Keighley and less than 0.5 miles (0.8 km) south-east from the centre of Cononley on Crosshills Road.

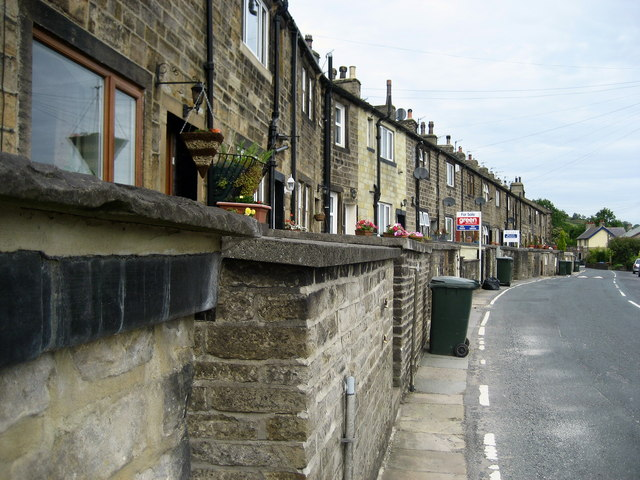
Crosshills Road, Aire View

Until 1974 it was part of the West Riding of Yorkshire. From 1974 to 2023 it was part of the Craven District, it is now administered by the unitary North Yorkshire Council.

Aire View holds one Grade II listed building, the late 17th to early 18th century Aire View Farmhouse with barn.
