= Abbotstone =

Village in Hampshire, England

- Hamlet
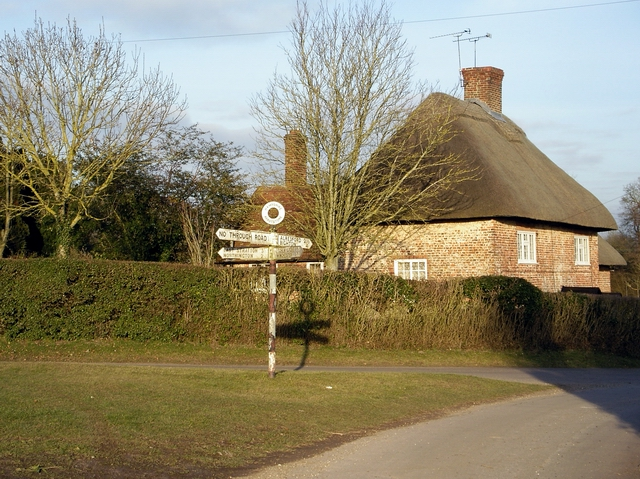
- Abbotsone village centre

- Location within Hampshire
- Population: 32
- OS grid reference: SU5635534533
  - London: 54 mi (87 km)
- Civil parish: Itchen Stoke and Ovington
- District: City of Winchester
- Shire county: Hampshire
- Region: South East
- Country: England
- Sovereign state: United Kingdom
- Post town: ALRESFORD
- Postcode district: SO24
- Dialling code: 01962
- Police: Hampshire and Isle of Wight
- Fire: Hampshire and Isle of Wight
- Ambulance: South Central
- UK Parliament: Winchester

Abbotstone is a hamlet in the United Kingdom in English county of Hampshire. It is located 2 miles from the nearest town, New Alresford, 6 miles from Winchester and 54 miles from London. It lies at an elevation of 67 metres within the district of the City of Winchester, and the closest town is New Alresford. It is now in the parish of Itchen Stoke, but was formerly its own parish. Abbotstone lies along the Ellisfield to Itchen Abbas portion of the Three Castles Path, a hiking path. Abbotstone contains an abandoned medieval village, and evidence of fortifications, as well as several abandoned quarries.

Abbotstone is home to 32 residents.

== Governance ==
The hamlet is part of the civil parish of Itchen Stoke and Ovington and is part of the City of Winchester non-metropolitan district of Hampshire County Council.
