= Aber-arad =

Village in Carmarthenshire, Wales

Coordinates: 52.034°N 4.459°W

- Location within Carmarthenshire
- Community: Newcastle Emlyn
- Principal area: Carmarthenshire
- Preserved county: Dyfed
- Country: Wales
- Sovereign state: United Kingdom
- Post town: NEWCASTLE EMLYN
- Postcode district: SA38
- Dialling code: 01239
- UK Parliament: Caerfyrddin
- Senedd Cymru – Welsh Parliament: Carmarthen East and Dinefwr

Aber-arad (also spelt Aberarad or Aber-Arad) is a village in Carmarthenshire, Wales, which lies less than one mile to the east of Newcastle Emlyn.

In 1870–72, John Marius Wilson in the Imperial Gazetteer of England and Wales described Aber Arad as:

ABERARAD, a village in the parish of Kenarth, Carmarthen; a mile east of Newcastle-Emlyn.

In 2023 it was reported that locals were unhappy with the noise and smell coming from Dairy Partners Ltd's cheese factory in the village. They also installed waste tanks without planning permission. Despite this the factory still wants to remain "good neighbours" with the locals of the village.
