= Agneash =

Coordinates: 54°14′43″N 4°24′34″W

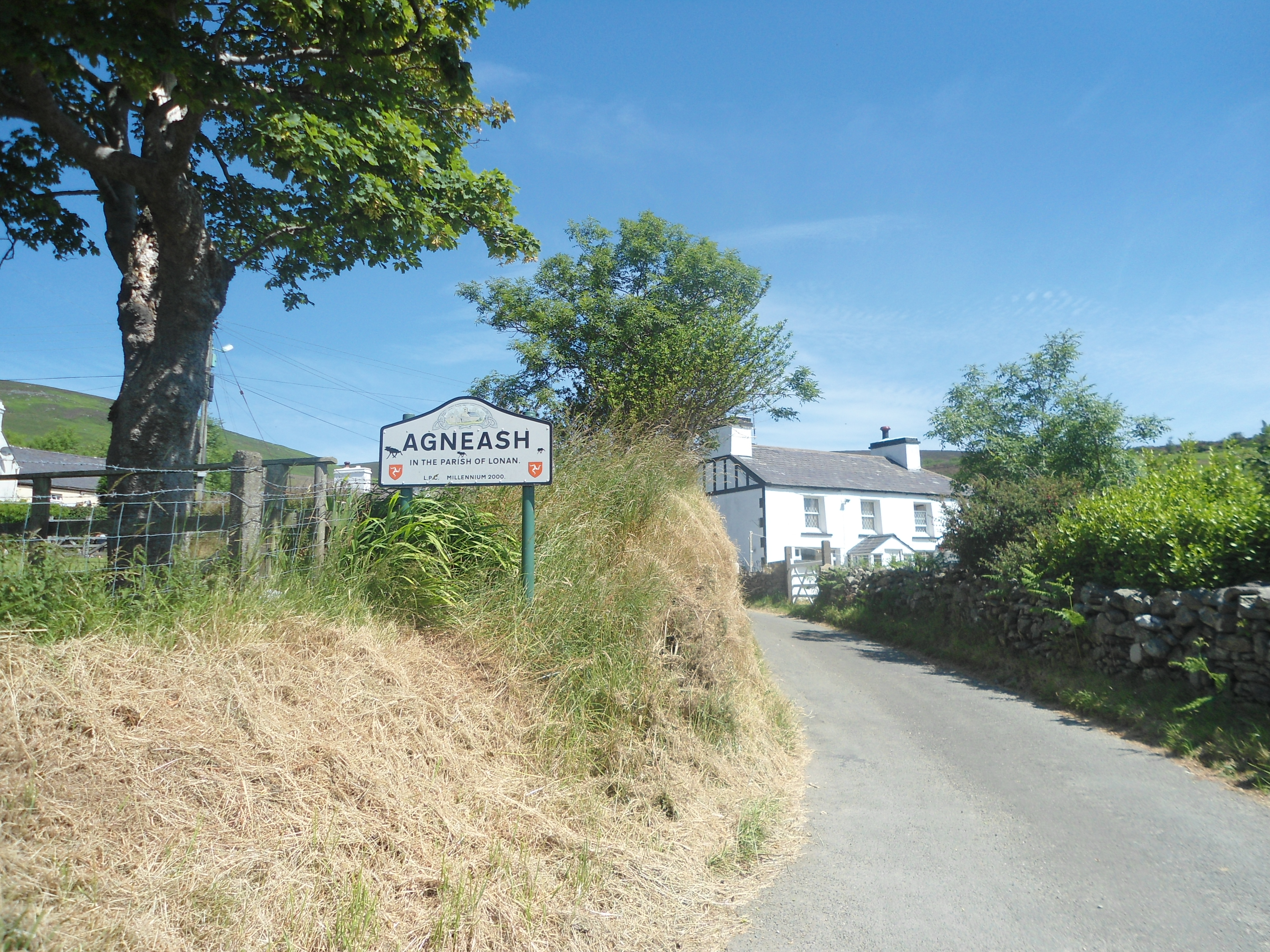
- Approaching Agneash village

- Location within the Isle of Man
- Parish: Lonan
- Crown dependency: Isle of Man
- Post town: ISLE OF MAN
- Postcode district: IM
- Police: Isle of Man
- Fire: Isle of Man
- Ambulance: Isle of Man
- House of Keys: Garff

Agneash is a small village in the Isle of Man, 1.9 kilometres (1.2 mi) by road north of Laxey. Agneash Primitive Methodist Chapel opened in 1857.

== Geography ==
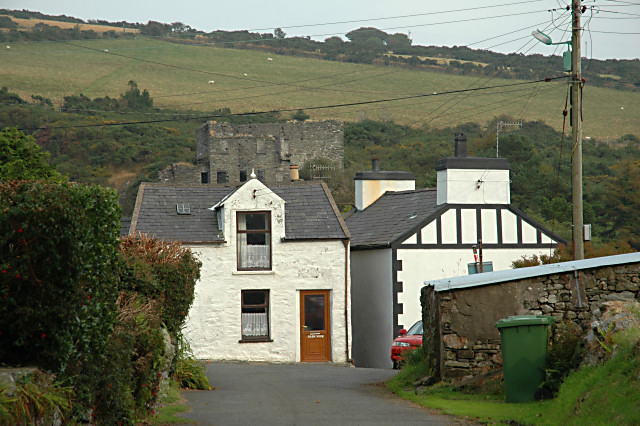
Agneash

Agneash lies to the north of Laxey in the Laxey River valley, in the parish of Lonan. To the northwest of the village is Agneash Waterfall.

Geologically the area belongs to the Creg Agneash Formation. Robert A. Chadwick in the British Geological Survey (2001) describes the formation as a "depositional product of medium-concentration turbidity currents punctuating a persistent background of lowconcentration events".

== Landmarks ==
Agneash Primitive Methodist Chapel was built in 1856–57, on a plot of land given by James Clague. It formally opened on 17 June 1857. It was run for decades by the Oliver family. Preacher John Oliver was killed in the Snaefell Mines disaster of 1897. Benjamin and Elijah Oliver and John Nelson Clague, local preachers associated with the chapel, later moved to England. In December 1865 it was proposed that Agneash should transfer to Douglas, Isle of Man, and re-proposed in March 1880. It was not until 1981 that Agneash joined the Douglas circuit.

In close proximity to Agneash is the Lady Isabella waterwheel, which was installed to help mine Engine Shaft in 1854. The wheel was named after the then governor's wife. Production increased significantly, with output of lead ore exceeding 1,000 tons in 1864 and remaining above it annually until 1892. Welsh Shaft was also mined in the area.

Cottages in the vicinity include Hillside Cottage and The Orchids.
