= Abshot =

Hamlet in Hampshire, England

Coordinates: 50.84°N 01.27°W

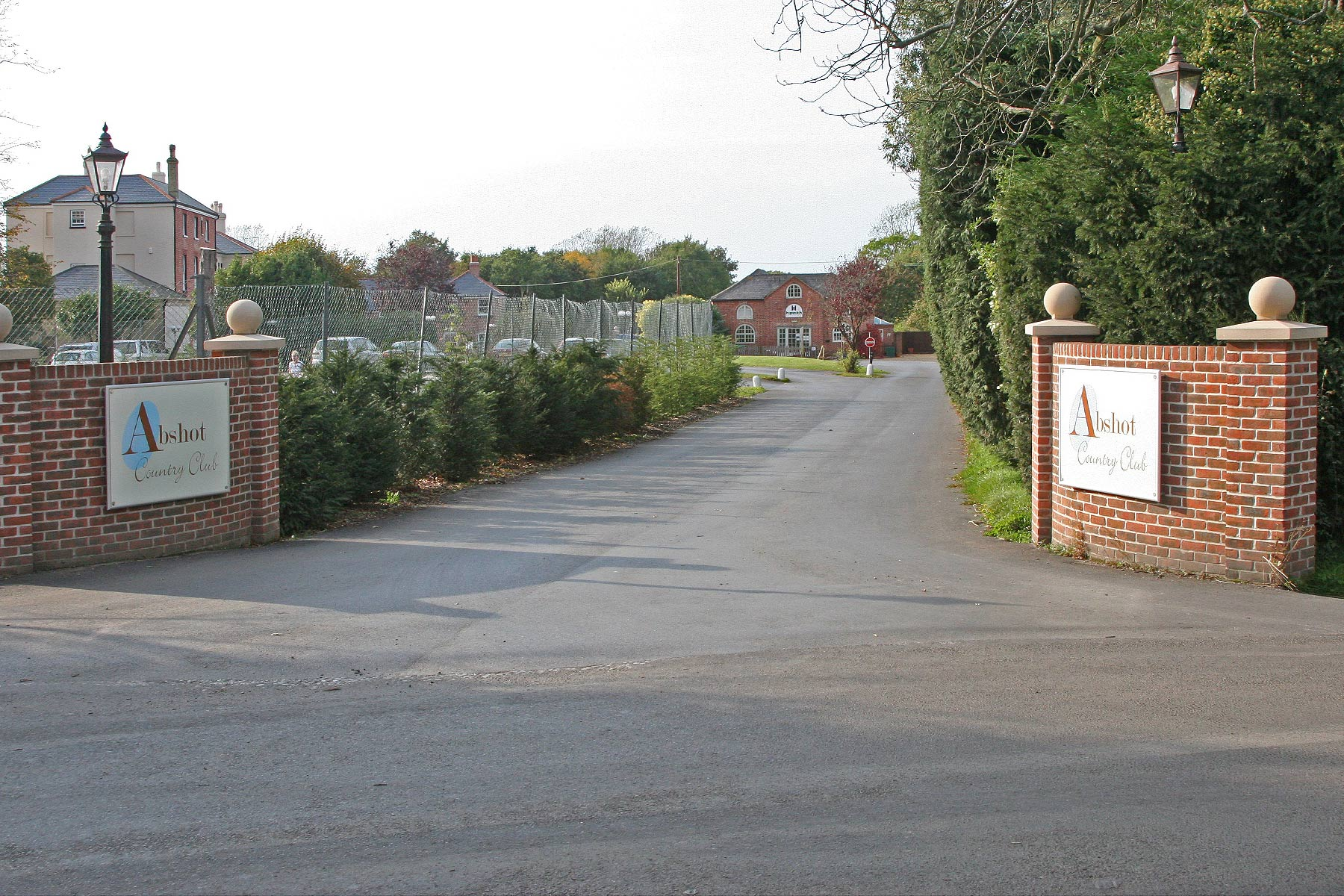
- Abshot

- Location within Hampshire
- OS grid reference: SU5105
- Shire county: Hampshire
- Region: South East
- Country: England
- Sovereign state: United Kingdom
- Police: Hampshire and Isle of Wight
- Fire: Hampshire and Isle of Wight
- Ambulance: South Central

Abshot is a hamlet in Hampshire, England. Abshot is situated on the eastern side of Southampton Water.

== Toponym ==
The name derives from "Abba's sciete" in Old English, with sciete meaning angle of land and referring to the hamlet's location in eastern Hook parish by Tichfield Common. It has also been historically spelled as Abbeshute/Abbechute and Abshott.
