= Airor =

Hamlet on the Scottish Highlands coast

Coordinates: 57.083°N 5.764°W

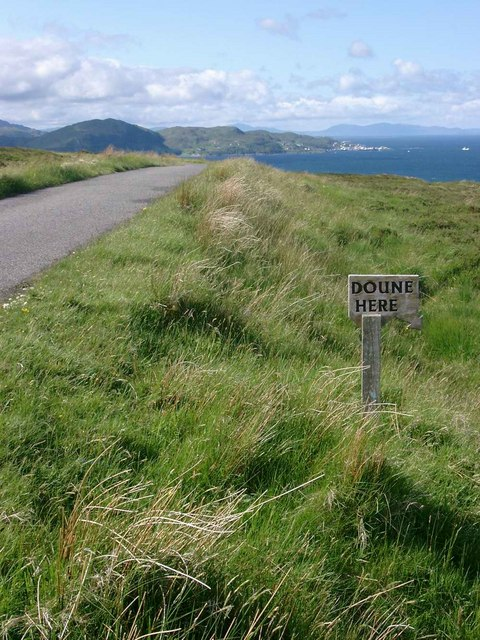

- Location within the Highland council area
- Population: 7
- OS grid reference: NG 71957 05456
- Council area: Highland
- Lieutenancy area: Inverness
- Country: Scotland
- Sovereign state: United Kingdom
- Post town: MALLAIG
- Postcode district: PH41
- Dialling code: 01687
- UK Parliament: Inverness, Skye and West Ross-shire
- Scottish Parliament: Inverness East, Nairn & Lochaber

Airor is a hamlet in the peninsula of Knoydart, Lochaber, Highland, on the west coast of Scotland.

It is situated on the north-west coast of Knoydart, and consists of a few houses clustered round Airor Bay, as well as several pre-clearance ruins. The settlement overlooks the Sound of Sleat and the Isle of Skye.
