= Abune-the-hill =

Place in the North of the Orkney Mainland

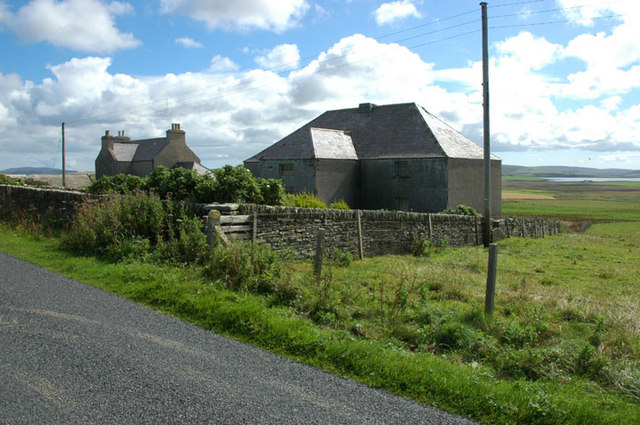
Abune the Hill Kirk and Manse. The kirk is no longer used

Abune-the-Hill is a place in the north of the Orkney Mainland (59.13° N 03.25° W HY2828) and just to the west of the Loch of Swannay.

Abune-the-Hill means "Above the hill" in the local dialect.

The site of a Romish Church is at Abune-the-Hill.
