= Abraham Heights =

Suburb of Lancaster, England

Coordinates: 54.044°N 2.820°W

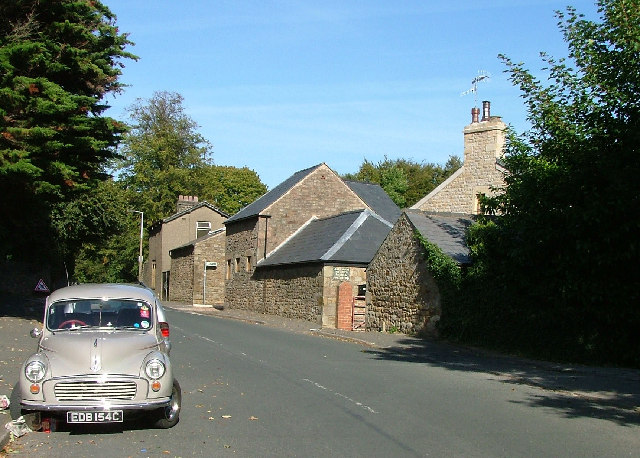
- Abraham Heights Farm

- Location in Lancaster Location in the City of Lancaster district Location within Lancashire
- OS grid reference: SD4661
- District: Lancaster
- Shire county: Lancashire
- Region: North West
- Country: England
- Sovereign state: United Kingdom
- Post town: LANCASTER
- Postcode district: LA1
- Dialling code: 01524
- Police: Lancashire
- Fire: Lancashire
- Ambulance: North West
- UK Parliament: Lancaster and Fleetwood

Abraham Heights is a suburb of Lancaster, Lancashire, England.

== Geography ==
It is west of the city centre, with the River Lune to the north and west, and the village of Aldcliffe to the south. It is part of the LA1 5 postcode area.
