= Adambrae =

Residential area and stream in Livingston, Scotland

Coordinates: 55.87244°N 3.52806°W

Adambrae: Scottish Gaelic: Bràigh Adhaimh; Scots: Adambrae
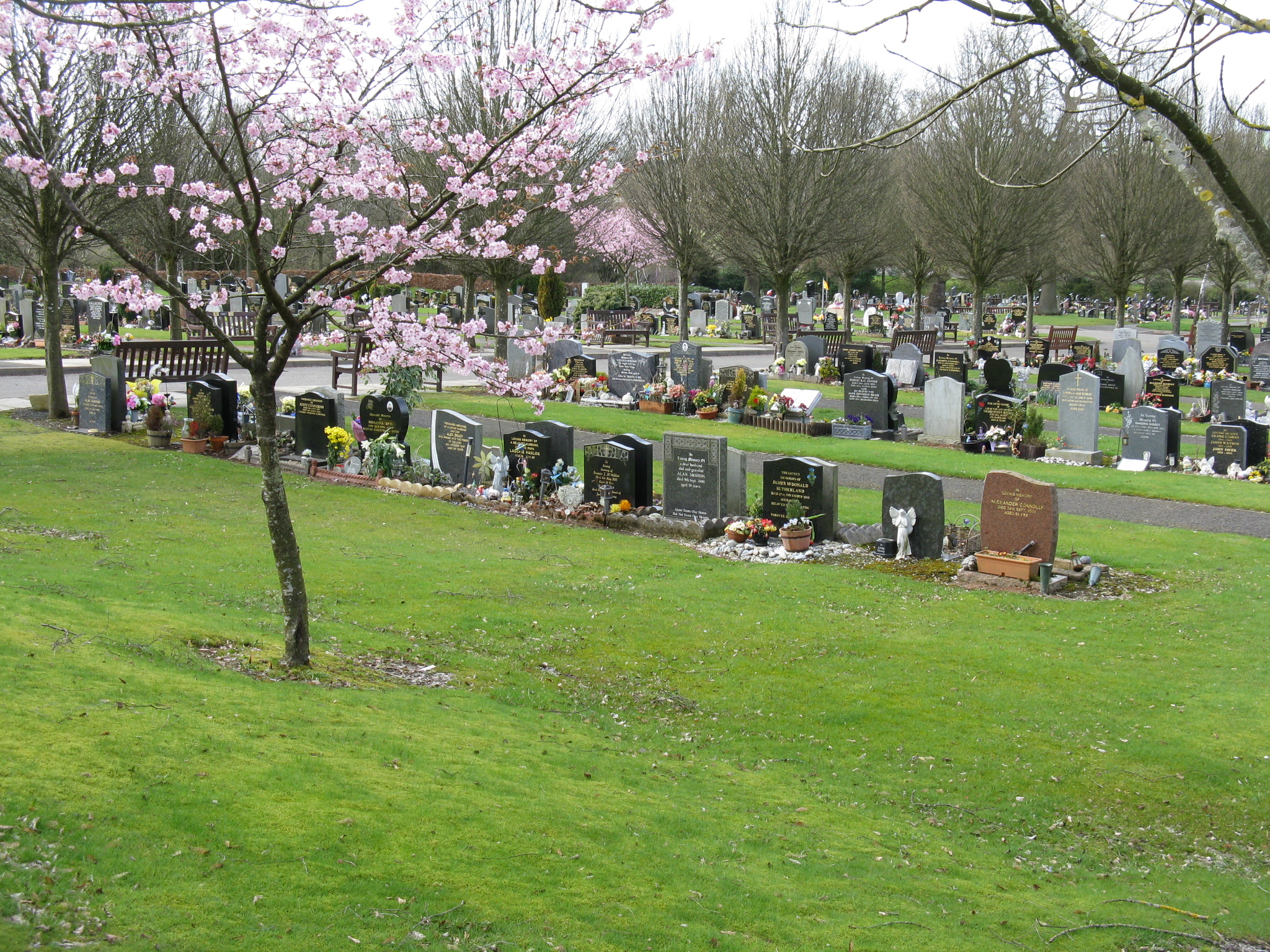
- Adambrae cemetery is the only cemetery open to public burial in Livingston

- Location within West Lothian
- Council area: West Lothian
- Lieutenancy area: West Lothian
- Country: Scotland
- Sovereign state: United Kingdom
- Post town: LIVINGSTON
- Postcode district: EH
- Dialling code: 01506
- Police: Scotland
- Fire: Scottish
- Ambulance: Scottish
- UK Parliament: Livingston
- Scottish Parliament: Almond Valley

Adambrae is a residential area and burn in Livingston, Scotland, consisting primarily of privately owned housing. A small nature area and pond are adjacent to Bluebell Glade in Adambrae where the "Adambrae burn" runs through the area.

== History ==
Adambrae is a relatively new residental area, with construction starting in 1998. Adambrae was the name of a farm further down the burn's course under Livingston centre. The farm was adjacent to the site of present-day Boulevard public house. In the Land Registry, properties in Adambrae are classified as Mid Lothian using pre-war local authority boundaries. The historical Adambrae farm housed a paper mill that was in production in the early 19th century. Adambrae Mill was said to have been established in 1730 by a Mr. Mitchell of nearby Alderstone.

The residential area was originally named Adambrae Parks and began as two streets, Heatherfield Glade and Sundew Glade. All streets in Adambrae have "Glade" in their name. There are now some 12 streets and at least 391 homes.

== Geography ==
Adambrae is located south-west of Livingston Town Centre and is bordered to the south by the A71 - village of Bellsquarry; to the east by Alderstone Road - Dedridge; to the west Wilderness Wood,; and to the north Charlesfield Road Kirkton. Adambrae is the only area of Livingston without through roads. Adambrae is one mile walk from the retail facilities of Livingston Town Centre.

The Wilderness Wood, which provides a public access area for walks and biking, is a circa 45 acre woodland site with paths.

== Facilities ==
Adambrae is home to one of Livingston's two cemeteries, the only one open for public burial as of January 2025. The cemetery was opened in June 1990 and is managed by West Lothian Council. In 2014, it was reported that the body of a man was buried in the wrong plot that went unnoticed for 15 months. In March 2021, the cemetery was heavily vandalised with 20 headstones damaged.

A children's play area is located there.

No primary school is available within Adambrae. The closest primary schools are Bankton Primary School and St Ninians RC Primary School, located in the Dedridge area.

The local high schools in Adambrae are St. Margaret's Academy and James Young High School.

The area has a residents association.
