= Achfrish =

Coordinates: 58.07°N 04.44°W

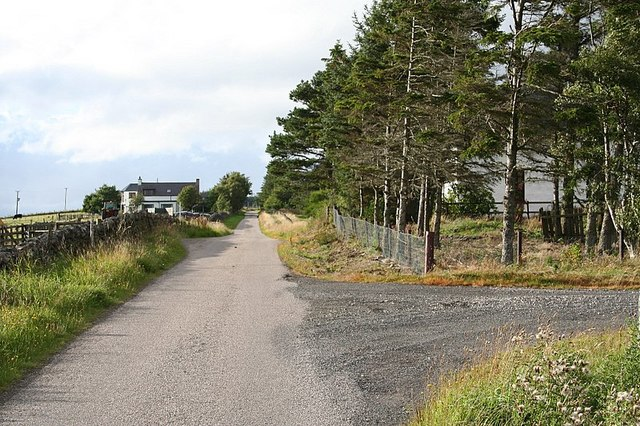

- Location within the Sutherland area
- OS grid reference: NC5612
- Council area: Highland
- Lieutenancy area: Sutherland
- Country: Scotland
- Sovereign state: United Kingdom
- Post town: Lairg
- Police: Scotland
- Fire: Scottish
- Ambulance: Scottish

Achfrish is a hamlet situated towards the southeastern part of Loch Shin on the north side of the Loch in Highland, Scotland. It is also part of the wider community of Shinness which is made up of Achfrish, Tirryside, Achnairn, Colabul, Blairbuie and West Shinness. Achfrish is on the hill overlooking Loch Shin with views of Ben More Assynt to the West and Ben Klibreck to the North.
