= Abbotsleigh, Devon =

Hamlet in Devon, England

Coordinates: 50.327°N 3.686°W

Abbotsleigh
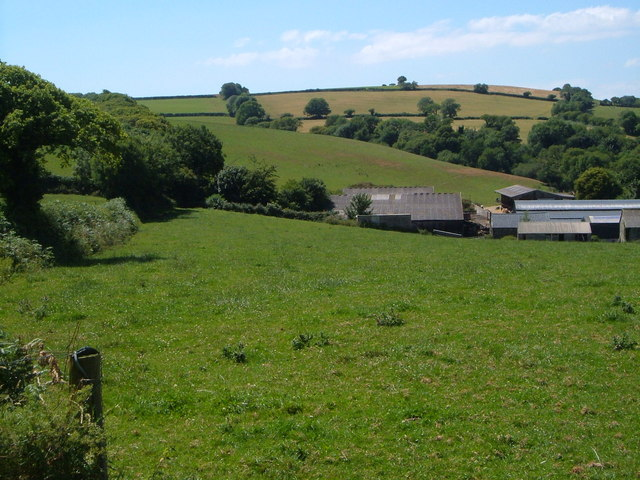
- Higher Abbotsleigh

- Location within Devon
- OS grid reference: SX801488
- Civil parish: Blackawton
- District: South Hams
- Shire county: Devon
- Region: South West
- Country: England
- Sovereign state: United Kingdom

Abbotsleigh is a hamlet in the county of Devon, England. Abbotsleigh is in the civil parish of Blackawton, within the district council of South Hams in Devon. It is about 5 miles (8.0 km) south-west of Dartmouth.
