= Abbey Gateway =

Abbey Gateway may refer to:

- Abbey Gateway, Chester, the former gateway of St Werburgh's Abbey in Chester, England
- Abbey Gateway, Malvern, the former gateway of Malvern Priory in Malvern, England that is now the home of Malvern Museum
- Abbey Gateway, Reading, the former inner gateway of Reading Abbey in Reading, England
- Abbey Gateway, St. Albans, the former gateway of the Benedictine Abbey in St. Albans, England
