= Achluachrach =

Coordinates: 56.88993°N 4.79425°W

Achnaluachrach: Scottish Gaelic: Ach na Luachrach
- Location within the Lochaber area
- OS grid reference: NN298810
- Council area: Highland
- Country: Scotland
- Sovereign state: United Kingdom
- Post town: ROY BRIDGE
- Postcode district: PH31
- Police: Scotland
- Fire: Scottish
- Ambulance: Scottish

Achluachrach (Gaelic: Ach Luachrach) is a small settlement in Glen Spean in Lochaber, in the Highland council area of Scotland. It is located on the A86 road, 3 km east of Roybridge and 8 km east of Spean Bridge. The River Spean and the West Highland Line both pass to the south of Achluachrach, the nearest station is at Roybridge. Achnaluarach is the location of the Glen Spean Lodge Hotel, as well as an independent hostel.
