= Achlyness =

Coordinates: 58.42279°N 4.9965°W

Achlyness: Scottish Gaelic: Achadh Linn an Eas
- Location within the Sutherland area
- OS grid reference: NC251521
- Council area: Highland
- Lieutenancy area: Sutherland
- Country: Scotland
- Sovereign state: United Kingdom
- Postcode district: IV27 4
- Police: Scotland
- Fire: Scottish
- Ambulance: Scottish
- UK Parliament: Caithness, Sutherland and Easter Ross
- Scottish Parliament: Caithness, Sutherland and Ross

Achlyness (Scottish Gaelic:Achadh Linn an Eas) is a crofting hamlet on the shores of Loch Inchard, located near Rhiconich, Sutherland, Scotland, within the council area of Highland.
