= Acarsaid =

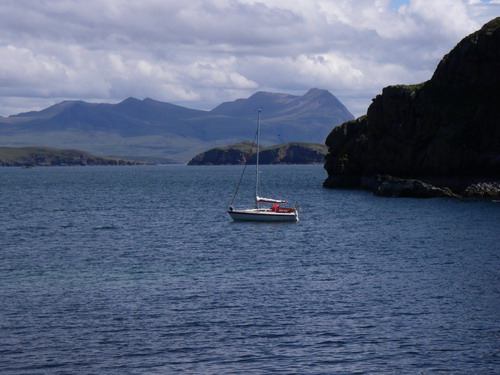
Acarsaid Eilean a' Chleirich, Priest Island, Summer Isles, Inner Hebrides, Scotland, with Ben More Coigach in the background.

Acarsaid or An Acarsaid is a common toponym in the Scottish Highlands. It means literally "anchorage" or "harbour" in Scottish Gaelic, and comes from the Old Norse akkarsaeti, meaning literally "anchor-seat".
