= Achnairn =

Coordinates: 58.08°N 4.45°W

Achnairn: Scottish Gaelic: Achadh an Fheàrna
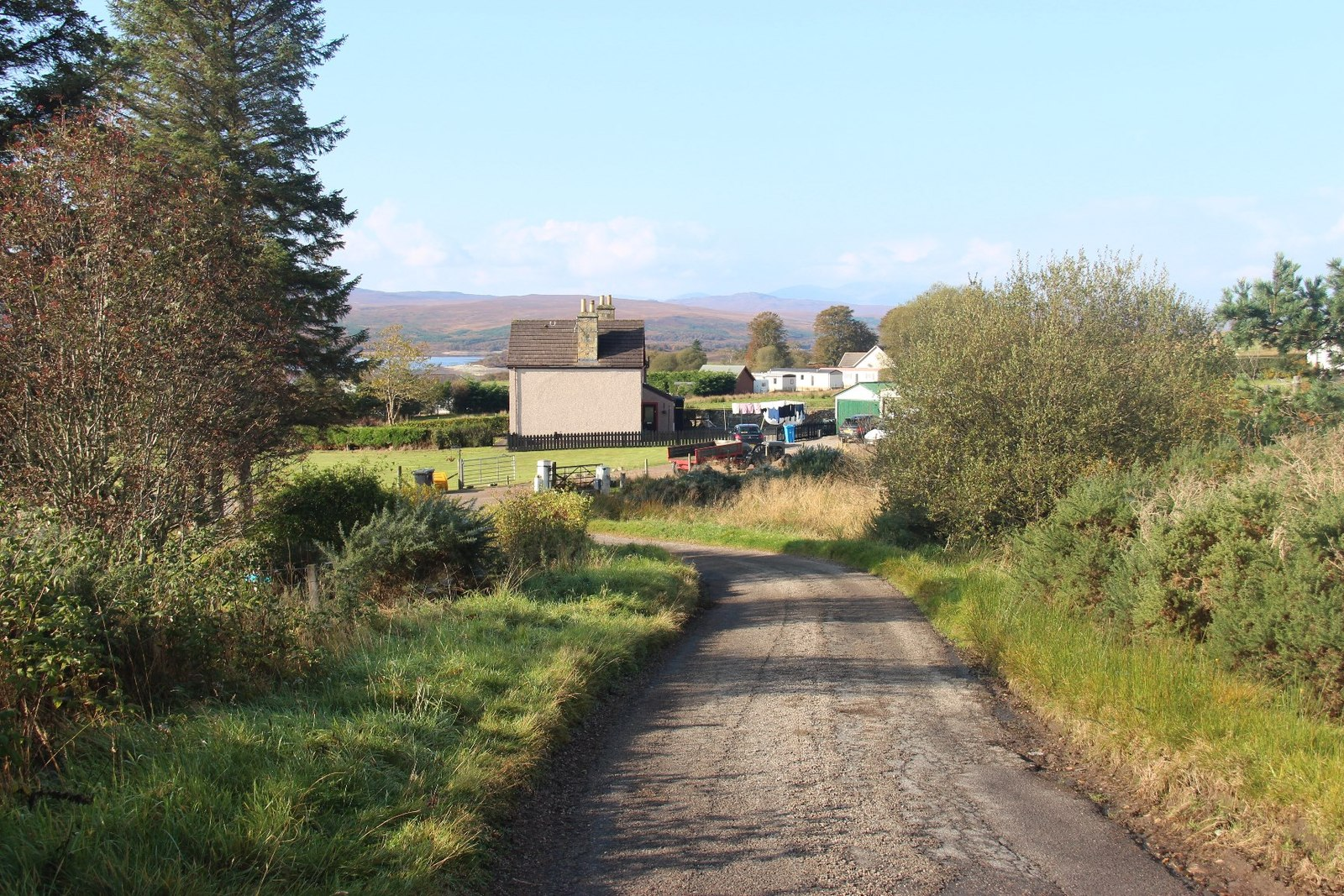
- Minor road through Achnairn, Sutherland

- Location within the Sutherland area
- Council area: Highland
- Lieutenancy area: Sutherland
- Country: Scotland
- Sovereign state: United Kingdom
- Post town: LAIRG
- Postcode district: IV27
- Dialling code: 01549
- Police: Scotland
- Fire: Scottish
- Ambulance: Scottish
- UK Parliament: Caithness, Sutherland and Easter Ross
- Scottish Parliament: Caithness, Sutherland and Ross

Achnairn (Scottish Gaelic: Achadh an Fheàrna) is a village in the Scottish council area of Highland, situated on the east side of Loch Shin.
