= Aish, Stoke Gabriel =

Hamlet in Devon, England

Coordinates: 50°25′08″N 3°37′47″W

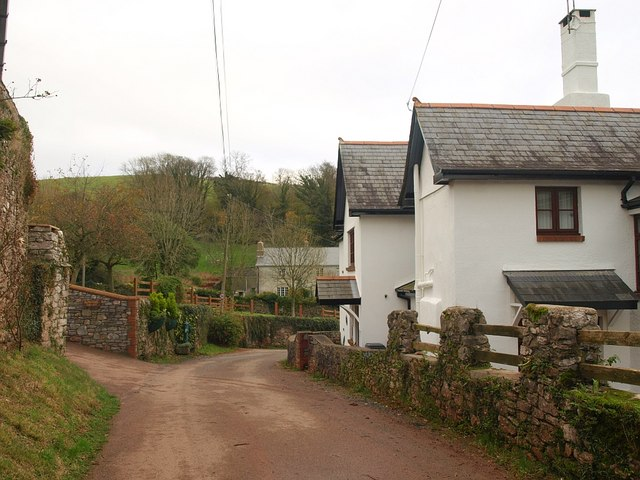
Aish

Aish is a hamlet in the English county of Devon, near the village of Stoke Gabriel.

Aish House is a Grade II listed 19th century house on the south side of Aish Road.

There is also a hamlet just outside South Brent with the same name.
