= Abbey Gate, Devon =

Coordinates: 50.76°N 03.00°W

Abbey Gate: Abbey Gate Lane
- Hamlet
- Location within Devon
- OS grid reference: SY2997
- Civil parish: Axminster
- District: East Devon
- Shire county: Devon
- Region: South West
- Country: England
- Sovereign state: United Kingdom
- Post town: AXMINSTER
- Postcode district: EX13
- Dialling code: 01297
- Police: Devon and Cornwall
- Fire: Devon and Somerset
- Ambulance: South Western
- UK Parliament: Honiton and Sidmouth

Abbey Gate is a hamlet just south of Axminster in Devon, England. Abbey Gate is at the junction between the A35 and A358 main roads, just west of Wyke.

Abbey Gate is in a very rural area and has almost no residential infrastructure, only consisting of a farm and a carpet factory. Abbey Gate has a bus stop is served by the local bus route 885. Much of a smaller hamlet called Archway House is within Abbey Gate and has many of its buildings within it.

Abbey Gate is the site of Newham Abbey, whence it takes its name. Abbey Gate has a camping and caravanning site.
