= Abbey Gate, Kent =

Hamlet in Kent, England

Coordinates: 51.29°N 00.50°E

Abbey Gate
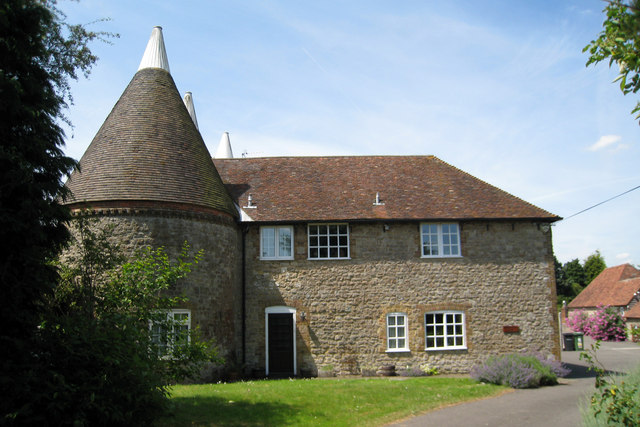
- Abbey Gate Oast, Stockett Lane

- Location within Kent
- OS grid reference: TQ7558
- Civil parish: Boxley
- District: Maidstone
- Shire county: Kent
- Region: South East
- Country: England
- Sovereign state: United Kingdom
- Police: Kent
- Fire: Kent
- Ambulance: South East Coast

Abbey Gate is a hamlet in Boxley civil parish in the borough of Maidstone in Kent, England.
