= Abbotswood, Surrey =

Abbotswood
- Suburb
- Location within Surrey
- OS grid reference: TQ0051
  - London: 26 mi (42 km)
- District: Guildford
- Shire county: Surrey
- Region: South East
- Country: England
- Sovereign state: United Kingdom
- Post town: Guildford
- Postcode district: GU
- Dialling code: 01483
- Police: Surrey
- Fire: Surrey
- Ambulance: South East Coast

Abbotswood is a suburb of Burpham in Surrey, England, it's also quite near to Guildford. Abbotswood is the closest part of Burpham to Guildford and its only distinctively named neighbourhood. It comprises detached houses and the George Abbot School - it includes a road named Abbotswood and only a few other side roads off London Road such as Boxgrove Avenue; as with Burpham, within the post town of Guildford, directly north and east of the small roundabout north of Stoke Park. The land here ranges from a line of western drained fields at almost river level, named spreads, in flood times, marshland to ascending gentle slopes eastwards including the street Ganghill reaching towards the New Guildford Line railway. It has two listed buildings: Woodways and Stoke Park Farm House.

== Geography ==
Abbotswood is small and modern, many of the streets are narrow and dead end and there's almost nothing inside the area officially considered Abbotswood in fact even the George Abbot School is officially outside Abbotswood. As is nearby Thorneycroft wood and Guildford Ambulance station.

== Transportation ==
London Road Guildford Railway Station isn't far from Abbotswood and a bus service directly serves it, with 4 different routes.
