= Aisby, West Lindsey =

Hamlet in Lincolnshire, England

Coordinates: 53.426208°N 0.688554°W

Aisby
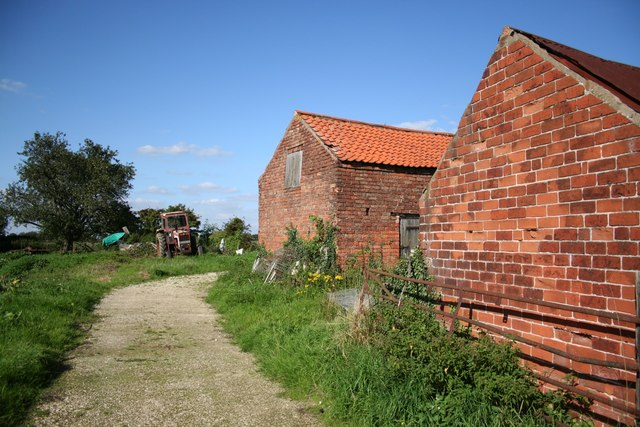
- Farmyard in Aisby

- Location within Lincolnshire
- OS grid reference: SK872929
  - London: 140 mi (230 km) S
- Civil parish: Corringham
- Unitary authority: West Lindsey
- Ceremonial county: Lincolnshire
- Region: East Midlands
- Country: England
- Sovereign state: United Kingdom
- Post town: Gainsborough
- Postcode district: DN21
- Police: Lincolnshire
- Fire: Lincolnshire
- Ambulance: East Midlands
- UK Parliament: Gainsborough

Aisby is a hamlet in the civil parish of Corringham, in the West Lindsey district of Lincolnshire, England. It is situated just over 1 mile (1.6 km) north from the A631 road and Corringham, 4 miles (6 km) north-east from Gainsborough, and 5 miles (8 km) south-east from Kirton in Lindsey.

Aisby is listed in the 1086 Domesday Book as "Aseby", in the Corringham Hundred of West Riding of Lindsey. It comprised 8 households, with 1 smallholder and 7 freemen. In 1066 Earl Edwin was Lord of the manor; by 1086 this had been transferred to King William, who also became Tenant-in-chief.

Old Hall, a Grade II listed building in Aisby, originates from the 14th century, with 17th-century alterations, and substantial alterations and additions in the 19th and 20th centuries.
