= Aish, South Brent =

Hamlet in Devon, England

Coordinates: 50°25′56″N 3°50′37″W

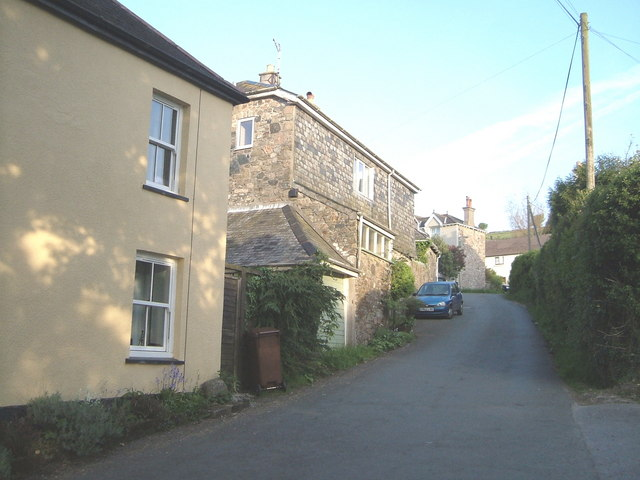
Aish.

Aish is a hamlet in the English county of Devon. It is near the large village of South Brent.

This Aish is not to be confused with the Aish near Stoke Gabriel, in the same district.

Some locals pronounce Aish as Ash.

Services are relatively bleak in Aish, with no shop, pub or anything in that sense; the nearest amenities are in the village of South Brent.

Aish has a very rural setting, almost being a quintessential quiet Devonshire hamlet.
