= Abbotswood, Hampshire =

Settlement in Hampshire, England

Coordinates: 51.006026°N 1.477575°W

Abbotswood
- Children's playground and new housing on the Abbotswood development

- Location within Hampshire
- OS grid reference: SU366231
- District: Test Valley
- Shire county: Hampshire
- Region: South East
- Country: England
- Sovereign state: United Kingdom
- Police: Hampshire and Isle of Wight
- Fire: Hampshire and Isle of Wight
- Ambulance: South Central

Abbotswood is a new 52-hectare building development planned to have 800 homes. It is located just to the north east of the town of Romsey in the Test Valley local government district.

== History ==
The name 'Abbotswood' is derived from 'the abbess [of Romsey]’s wood'; it was recorded as Abbys wode in 1513 and Abbes wood in 1565.

== New development ==
Outline permission for a new development comprising 800 homes on a site at Abbotswood was granted in 2010. Construction began in 2011 and by the end of 2017, 753 homes were occupied.

New homes nearing completion on the Abbotswood development

On 1 August 2014, planning permission was sought for a local centre consisting of a shop, pub, doctors/dentists surgery, pharmacy, community centre, and a day nursery. The planning application reference is 14/01836/RESS.
