= Listed buildings in Port Sunlight =

Port Sunlight is a model village in Wirral, Merseyside, England. It contains over 196 buildings that are recorded in the National Heritage List for England as designated listed buildings. Of these, one is listed at Grade I, the highest of the three grades, one at grade II*, and the others are at Grade II, the lowest grade.

== History ==
The model village of Port Sunlight was developed by William Lever (later 1st Viscount Leverhulme) to provide housing for the workers in the nearby soap-making factory of Lever Brothers. The building of the factory started in 1888 with the help of William Owen, an architect from Warrington, where Lever previously had a factory, and the earliest houses were designed by Owen. Over the next 35 years the village grew and more houses were built.

The houses were built in blocks, each block was surrounded by green space, and each family was provided with an allotment for growing their own food. The houses were set in parkland, and public buildings were also constructed. All the groups of houses were individually designed, and all were different from the others. They were built in brick, stone, and half-timbering, and incorporated features from many architectural styles, including medieval, Jacobean, and Queen Anne, with English, French, Dutch, and Flemish influences. The houses were built at the low density of seven per acre (compared with the 40 per acre required at the time by bye-laws).

Lever employed nearly 30 architects, but was involved in all the designs, vetting every one of them himself. Most of the architects were local, but some London architects were also used. Following his earliest commissions, Owen continued to design more houses and other buildings, later in partnership with his eldest son, Segar Owen. The local architects mainly used were Grayson and Ould of Liverpool, John Douglas of Chester (in the partnerships of Douglas and Fordham and Douglas and Minshull), J. J. Talbot, and Wilson and Talbot of Liverpool. T. M. Lockwood of Chester designed two groups of houses. The architects from London included Maurice Bingham Adams, Ernest George and Yeates, Edwin Lutyens, and Ernest Newton. Some of the earlier designs were by Lever's friend Jonathan Simpson, and after 1910 almost all the buildings were designed by his son, James Lomax-Simpson.

Lever also commissioned designs for public buildings in the village. The earliest of these, Gladstone Hall (now the Gladstone Theatre) (1891), was originally a men's dining and recreation room by William and Segar Owen. Douglas and Fordham designed the school known as the Lyceum (1894–96), and this was followed by the Lever Club (1896), a social club for men by Grayson and Ould. The Bridge Inn (1900), also by Grayson and Ould, was built as a temperance hotel, and Hulme Hall (1901) by William and Segar Owen was a women's dining hall. The primary school (1902–03) was designed by Grayson and Ould, Christ Church (1902–04), a Congregational church, is by the Owens, Hesketh Hall, a technical institute (1903), is by J. J. Talbot, and the cottage hospital (1905–07) (now a hotel) is by Grayson and Ould. In 1913, a girl's club, now the visitors' centre, was designed by James Lomax-Simpson. The largest public building in the village is the Lady Lever Art Gallery (1914–22), built as a memorial to Lady Lever and designed by the Owens. Lever also commissioned a war memorial (1919–21) by W. Goscombe John.

Following Lever's death, the Leverhulme Memorial (1930) was erected near the Lady Lever Art Gallery; it was designed by James Lomax-Simpson with sculpture by William Reid Dick. Other listed buildings in the village, aside from houses, include Dell Bridge (1894), a footbridge by Douglas and Fordham; the frontage of the factory, known as Lever House (1895), by the Owens; a group of four hostels for girls (1896), by Maxwell and Tuke of Bury, that was later used as a bank and heritage centre; a sculpture known as the sphinx (probably about 1896); the Silver Wedding Fountain (1899), built to celebrate the silver wedding of Lever and his wife; a pool (probably about 1913) with a fountain by Charles Wheeler added in 1949; a pair of telephone kiosks (1935) by Giles Gilbert Scott; and an arch and the walls surrounding the rose garden (about 1937) by James Lomax-Simpson.

== Key ==
Grade	Criteria
I	Buildings of exceptional interest, sometimes considered to be internationally important
II*	Particularly important buildings of more than special interest
II	Buildings of national importance and special interest

== Buildings ==
=== Communal ===
Name and location	Photograph	Date	Notes	Grade
Gladstone Hall; 53.34840°N 2.99717°W		1891	Originally a recreation room and men's dining room by William and Segar Owen, altered by James Lomax-Simpson, and later used as a theatre. It is mainly in a single storey with fourbays. It is in brick with tile-hanging above and a tiled roof. The left bay has a projection with a bay window and two gabled dormers above. Each of the other bays has a shallow glazed gable, the central one having a glazed porch.	II
Dell Bridge; 53.35023°N 2.99624°W		1894	A sandstone footbridge by Douglas and Fordham consisting of a single parabolic arch. It has keystones with moulded masks, inscribed plaques, a sundial and flanking buttresses. On the bridge are refuges with seats.	II
Lyceum; 53.35053°N 2.99632°W		1894–96	Originally a school by Douglas and Fordham it has since been used for other purposes. It is in brick with stone banding and dressings, and has slate roofs with tiled ridges. It main front has five bays with gables and finials; all but one of the gables are shaped. At the right end is an octagonal clock tower with a slate spire and weathervane.	II
Bridge House; 53.35029°N 2.99693°W		1894	A house by Douglas and Fordham and for a time the home of William Lever. It is in two storeys and has two bays on the front, a canted bay on the corner and one bay on the side. The recessed entrance on the front has an elliptical head. The corner bay has a bay window, a jettied upper floor and a shaped gable.	II
Lever House; 53.34827°N 2.99642°W		1895	An office block by William and Segar Owen, extended in 1913–14 by James Lomax-Simpson. The original block is in a single storey with 35 bays; the later block at the rear is in two storeys and has 21 bays. The middle eleven bays at the front are in stone with a central pedimented doorway and a balustrade. The other bays are in brick with stone dressings and a slate roof.	II
Bank and former heritage centre 53.34900°N 2.99702°W		1896	Originally four hostels for girls by Maxwell and Tuke, later used as a bank and heritage centre. The building is in two storeys and four bays. The ground floor is in brick with bay windows, above this is a pargetted frieze, and the upper storey is timber-framed with jettied decorated gables.	II
Lever Club; 53.34900°N 2.99808°W		1896	A men's social club by Grayson and Ould in two storeys. The lower storey is in brick with stone dressings, and the jettied upper floor is timber-framed. In the upper floor are gabled half-dormers. An extension was added to the north in 1869.	II
Sphinx; 53.35148°N 2.99524°W		c. 1896 (probable)	A sculpture on a concrete base with a cornice and a stone cap decorated with an anthemion frieze. On the cap is a female sphinx in stone.	II
Silver Wedding Fountain; 53.34894°N 2.99745°W		1899	A drinking fountain to celebrate the silver wedding of William Lever and his wife. It is in pink granite and has a semicircular bowl on Ionic columns with a dog bowl below and flanking seats.	II
Bridge Inn; 53.35268°N 2.99497°W		1900	A public house by Grayson and Ould that was later enlarged. It has a symmetrical U-shaped plan. it is in two storeys, and is roughcast on a brick base with a tiled roof. Its features include two-storey bow windows, glazed wooden verandahs with balconies and balustrades, and jettied gables with decorated bargeboards.	II
Hulme Hall; 53.35182°N 2.99669°W		1901	Originally a women's dining room by William and Segar Owen, later a community centre. It is in a single storey with six bays, built in brick with stone dressings, timber-framed gables and a slate roof with tiled ridges. The central bays are recessed, and other features include bay windows and buttresses.	II
Fire station 53.34917°N 2.99661°W		1902	The fire station is by William and Segar Owen. It is built in brick with stone dressings and has a tiled roof. Originally in four bays, extensions were later added to the sides and rear. Features include transomed casement windows, elliptical-headed entrances, diapering in the loft, and a jettied shingled gable.	II
Christ Church; 53.35351°N 2.99540°W		1902–04	The church, originally Congregational, is by William and Segar Owen, and built in sandstone with a stone-slate roof. The church consists of a nave, aisles, transepts, a chancel, and a southeast tower. The Lady Lever memorial was added at the west end in 1914; it contains the tombs of Lord and Lady Leverhulme.	II*
Hesketh Hall; 53.35923°N 2.99630°W		1903	Originally a technical institute by J. J. Talbot, later extended and used by the British Legion, it is in two storeys with a five-bay front. The ground floor is in stone, the upper storey is pebbledashed and the roof is tiled. On the front are three gables, each containing a Venetian window, and on the roof is a cupola. The extension includes an elaborately decorated frieze and pargetted gables.	II
Lych gate 53.35355°N 2.99586°W		c. 1904	The lych gate is at the entrance to the churchyard of Christ Church and is probably by William and Segar Owen. It is timber-framed on stone walls, and is three bays deep. The gables have decorated bargeboards.	II
Primary school 53.35460°N 2.99610°W		1902–03	A school by Grayson and Ould, mainly in brick with some pebbledashing, and tiled roofs. It has an irregular plan and is mainly in a single storey. Features include a Venetian window, gables, some of which are shaped, roof dormers, and three open turrets, each with an ogival cupola and a weathervane.	II
Former cottage hospital 53.35588°N 2.99593°W		1905–07	Originally a cottage hospital by Grayson and Ould, later a training centre, a rest home, and then a hotel. It is in one and two storeys and has a complex plan. The building is pebbledashed with stone dressings, a slate roof, and a tiled ridge. The entrance has an architrave, pilasters, a frieze, and a cornice on consoles. On the roof are octagonal cupolas.	II
Pool and fountain 53.35489°N 2.99886°W		c. 1913 (probable)	A low wall surrounds the pond, rising to the south and forming the back to a seat. In 1949 a fountain by Charles Wheeler was added. This depicts a man and a boy on a horse, flanked by dolphins.	II
Visitor Centre, 21 and 22 King George's Drive; 53.35489°N 2.99822°W		1913	Originally a girls' club, then a residents' club and after that a visitor centre by James Lomax-Simpson, It is in two storeys and an attic, and has three bays facing the corner of the street. It is roughcast with some brick and timber-framing and has tiled roofs. On the front are two two-storey bay windows, between them is the entrance, and above this is an inscribed panel. The two houses behind are included in the listing.	II
Lady Lever Art Gallery; 53.35579°N 2.99931°W		1914–22	An art gallery by William and Segar Owen as a memorial to Lady Leverhulme and to house Lever's art collection. It is in Neoclassical style and built in reinforced concrete with cladding in Portland stone. The gallery has a rectangular plan, with an Ionic entrance on each side and two shallow domes on the top. Inside is a central top-lit gallery, a rotunda at each end, and rooms along the sides.	II
War Memorial; 53.35303°N 2.99791°W		1919–21	The war memorial was commissioned by William Lever and designed by W. Goscombe John. In the centre is a cross on a plinth, both in granite. This is surrounded by eleven bronze figures, and on the plinth are plaques with the name of the employees of Lever Brothers lost in the World Wars. Around it is a seating area with a circular parapet approached by four flights of steps.	I
Leverhulme Memorial; 53.35566°N 2.99997°W		1930	The memorial is to William Lever, it was designed by James Lomax-Simpson, with sculpture by William Reid Dick. It stands on a roundabout to the west of the Lady Lever Art Gallery. The memorial consists of a granite obelisk on which stands a bronze female figure who represents Inspiration. To the west of the base is a group of four more bronze figures.	II
Telephone kiosks 53.34942°N 2.99780°W		1935	A pair of K6 type telephone kiosks outside the former post office. They were designed by Giles Gilbert Scott, and are constructed in cast iron with a square plan and a dome. The kiosks have three unperforated crowns in the top panels.	II
K6 Telephone Kiosk; 53.3553°N 2.9968°W		1935	Telephone kiosk. Type K6. Designed 1935 by Sir Giles Gilbert Scott. Made by various contractors. Cast iron. Square kiosk with domed roof. Unperforated crowns to top panels and margin glazing to windows and door.	II
Arch and walls 53.35232°N 2.99755°W		c. 1937	The terrace and retaining stone walls around the rose garden and the arch leading it are by James Lomax-Simpson. The arch has an open pediment and flat pilasters, and it is flanked by a balustrade.	II

=== William Owen ===
Name and location	Photograph	Date	Notes	Grade
1 Bolton Road; 53.35072°N 2.99866°W		1889	A house by William Owen in two storeys with fronts of two and three bays. It is in brick with stone dressings and has a tiled roof. On the corner is a canted bay window, and on the long side the central bay projects forward under a shaped gable and there is another bay window.	II
5 and 7 Bolton Road; 53.35084°N 2.99833°W		1890	A pair of houses by William Owen in brick with tile-hanging in the gables and a tiled roof. They are in two storeys and two-bays. The central part of the house projects forward and has canted bay windows with cornices and parapets under asymmetrical gables.	II
9–13 Bolton Road; 53.35098°N 2.99808°W		1890	Three houses by William Owen in two storeys and four bays, in brick with a tiled roof. The third bay projects forward, has a jettied tile-hung gable, and contains an oriel window. The other bays contain half-dormers, and the porch is under a cat-slide roof.	II
17–21 Bolton Road; 53.35139°N 2.99729°W		1890	Three houses, later converted into flats, by William Owen in two storeys with attics seven bays. The ground floor is in brick with stone dressings, the upper storey is in stone-chip roughcast, and the roof is tiled. The outer bays project forward and have bay windows and timber-framed gables. Above the central doorway are mullioned windows, the upper one in a gabled dormer with finials. Flanking this in the upper floor are oriel windows.	II
71–74 Greendale Road; 53.35028°N 2.99842°W		1891	A terrace of four houses by William Owen in two storeys and three bays. They are mainly in brick with a tiled roof. The gabled central bay has a two-storey bay window with tile-hanging between the floors and in the gable. The other upper floor windows are oriels.	II
75–78 Greendale Road; 53.35008°N 2.99834°W		1891	A terrace of four houses by William Owen in two storeys and three bays. The houses are in brick with stone dressings and some tile-hanging, and have a tiled roof. The second bay projects forward under a gable. There are oriel windows in the upper storey of the second bay and the lower storey of the third bay.	II
79–82 Greendale Road; 53.34987°N 2.99821°W		1891	A terrace of four houses by William and Segar Owen in two storeys and three bays. The houses are in brick with stone dressings and some tile-hanging, and have a tiled roof. The middle bay forms a gabled two-storey canted bay window. In the other bays are oriel windows.	II
1–7 Park Road; 53.34967°N 2.99759°W		1892–94	A terrace of four houses by William Owen in two storeys and four bays. The lower storey is in brick and contains bay windows. The upper storey of the first bay is pebbledashed with a flat-roofed dormer. The central two bays have timber-framed gables with pargetting including inscribed panels. The fourth bay has a smaller timber-framed gable and pebbledashing.	II
14–22 Park Road; 53.34959°N 2.99614°W		1893	A terrace of five houses by William and Segar Owen. They are built mainly in brick with stone dressings, they are in a single storey with attics and a five-bay gabled front. Two of the gables are timber-framed, the others have a pargetted panels, and one gable is tile-hung. The windows are casements, those in the ground floor having decorative heads.	II
16–22 Bridge Street, 24 Park Road, 25 Wood Street; 53.34969°N 2.99582°W		1894	A terrace of six houses by William Owen in one storey with attics with a front of six bays. The ground floor is in stone, the upper parts are mainly timber-framed, and the roof is slated with a tile ridge. There are two gables of different sizes and a two-storey bay window.	II
89–92 Greendale Road; 53.34920°N 2.99719°W		1894	A terrace of four houses by William Owen in two storeys with attics and seven bays. The ground floor is in brick with stone dressings, the upper storey is pebbledashed, and the roof is tiled. Features include one- and two-storey canted bay windows, bull's eye windows, and dormers with pedimented gables.	II
2 and 4 Park Road; 53.34935°N 2.99699°W		1894	A pair of houses by William and Segar Owen. They have an L-shaped plan, and are in two gabled storeys. The lower storey is in brick, and the upper storey is timber-framed. The gables have decorative bargeboards and bressumers. No. 2 has a jettied gable, and No. 4 has a canted bay window. The windows are a mix of casements and sashes.	II
6–12 Park Road; 53.34938°N 2.99652°W		1894	A terrace of four houses by William and Segar Owen in two storeys and six bays. They are mainly in brick and have a tiled roof. The outer bays have an oriel window in the lower floor and a plastered gable. The other bays have a jettied timber-framed upper floor with oriel windows, and jettied gables. In the ground floor are bay windows.	II
9–17 Park Road; 53.34993°N 2.99732°W		1894	A terrace of five houses by William and Segar Owen in two storeys and five bays. The ground floor is in brick, the upper floor is jettied and timber-framed, and the roof is tiled. Each bay has a gable with decorated bargeboards, and finials in the form of a heraldic beast.	II
1–7 Wood Street; 53.34897°N 2.99643°W		1894	A terrace of four houses by William Owen. They are in brick with stone dressings and a tiled roof. The houses are in a single storey with an attic and four bays. There are three gables, the largest one being over the central two bays, they are timber-framed, and have decorative bargeboards. The windows are mullioned and contain casements.	II
28–36 Park Road; 53.35044°N 2.99511°W		1895	A terrace of five houses by William Owen in two storeys and five gabled bays. They are mainly in brick with terracotta dressing. The left bay has a bay window and a pebbledashed upper storey. The right bay also has a bay window, and the upper storey is timber-framed. The middle three bays have diapering and Dutch gables.	II
22–42 Bolton Road; 53.35179°N 2.99568°W		1895–96	A terrace of 11 houses by William Owen in two storeys and eleven bays, the middle five bays being recessed. The lower storey is in brick with stone dressings, the upper storey plastered with some timber-framing, tile-hanging and shingling, and the roofs are tiled. Features include decorative bargeboards, bow windows, bay windows, half-dormers, and two inscribed oval plaques.	II
250–254 New Chester Road; 53.35482°N 2.99262°W		1896–98	Three houses by William Owen in two storeys and three bays. The ground floor is in brick, the upper floor is plastered, and the roof is tiled. The doorways are elliptical-headed.	II
262–266 New Chester Road; 53.35448°N 2.99234°W		1896–98	Three houses by William Owen in two storeys and three bays. The ground floor is in brick, the upper floor is plastered, and the roof is tiled. The left bay projects forward, is jettied and has an asymmetrical gable. The middle bay also has a gable, and in the right bay is a flat-topped dormer.	II
276–282 New Chester Road; 53.35375°N 2.99182°W		1896–99	Four houses by William Owen in one storey with attics and four bays, the fourth bay being recessed. The ground floor is in brick, the upper floor is plastered, and the roof is tiled. Three of the bays are gabled, and the upper floor and gables have decorative brick diapering.	II
61–69 Bolton Road, 69 Corniche Road; 53.35377°N 2.99301°W		1898	Six houses by William Owen in two storeys with six bays, three of them curving round a corner. They are pebbledashed on a brick base with brick dressings and diapering and have tiled roofs. Most of the houses have oriel windows.	II
224–228 New Chester Road; 53.35563°N 2.99335°W		1898	Three houses by William and Segar Owen in one storey with an attic. The lower storey is in brick, the upper storey is plastered, and the roof is tiled. The upper floor windows are in gabled half-dormers, and there are canopies above the doors.	II
256–260 New Chester Road; 53.35464°N 2.99254°W		1898	Three houses by William Owen in two storeys and three bays. The lower storey is in brick, the upper floor is plastered with diapering, and the roof is tiled. Each of the bays is gabled.	II
1-5 Corniche Road; 53.35583°N 2.99382°W		1898	Three houses by William Owen in one storey with attics and three-bays. The ground floor is in brick and the upper storey is plastered with brick dressings. The middle bay projects forward and is gabled. In the other bays are gabled half-dormers with tile-hanging above.	II
57–65 Bebington Road; 53.35884°N 2.99973°W		c. 1899	A terrace of five houses by William and Segar Owen in two storeys and three bays flanked by projecting pavilions. The ground floor is in brick, the upper storey is pebbledashed, and the roof is tiled. The windows in the upper floor are oriels. The central window projects above the eaves and has a round pediment; the pavilions have half-dormers with segmental pediments.	II
2–16 Circular Drive, 2 and 4 Primrose Hill; 53.35867°N 2.99856°W		1899	A terrace of ten houses, angled on a corner, by William and Segar Owen. They are in two storeys, and have a total front of twelve bays. The lower storey is in brick, the upper storey is pebbledashed with some diapering, there is some tile-hanging, and the roofs are tiled. Features include jettied upper floors and gables, and oriel windows.	II
212–216 New Chester Road; 53.35660°N 2.99400°W		1899	Three houses by William and Segar Owen in two storeys and three bays with tiled roofs. The first bay is recessed and gabled with a brick lower storey and pebbledashing above. The other bays are in brick that is decorated in the upper storey.	II
218–222 New Chester Road; 53.35579°N 2.99345°W		1899	Three houses by William and Segar Owen in one storey with attics. They have a three-bay front, the right bay being recessed. The ground floor is in brick, the upper floor is plastered with diapering, and the hipped roofs are tiled. The upper floor windows are in hipped half-dormers.	II
1–7 Pool Bank, 28–38 Circular Drive; 53.35840°N 2.99699°W		c. 1899	A terrace of ten houses by William and Segar Owen on a corner site. They are in two storeys, with eight bays on one side, five on the other and a canted bay between. The lower storeys are in brick with stone dressings, the upper floor is pebbledashed, and the roofs are tiled. Some of the gables contain tile-hanging, and some of the upper floor windows are oriels.	II
2–10 Lodge Lane; 53.35636°N 2.99427°W		1900	Five houses by William and Segar Owen in two storeys and six bays in an irregular plan. They are in brick with some diapering, tile-hanging and pebbledashing, and have tiled roofs and gables.	II
170–176 New Chester Road; 53.35765°N 2.99501°W		1900	A terrace of four houses by William Owen in two storeys and four bays, the outer bays projecting forward under gables. The ground floor is in brick, the upper storey is pebbledashed with some brick decoration, and the roof is tiled.	II
1–5 Church Drive, 5–7 The Causeway; 53.35377°N 2.99645°W		1901	Eight houses by William and Segar Owen on a corner site in two storeys and with a total front of ten bays. The lower storeys are in brick with stone dressings, the upper floors are roughcast, and the roofs are tiled. In the ground floor are bay windows. The upper floor windows are either in asymmetrical gables or are flat-topped dormers.	II
64–78 Bolton Road; 53.35346°N 2.99236°W		1912	A terrace of eight houses by William and Segar Owen in one storey with attics. They have a symmetrical six-bay front, with the outer bays canted forward. The houses are pebbledashed on a brick base, and have a tiled roof, the roof continuing down in some bays to form canopies. Other features are bay windows and gabled roof dormers.	II
1–7 Water Street; 53.35308°N 2.99216°W		1912	A terrace of four houses by William and Segar Owen in two storeys and six bays. They are mainly pebbledashed on a brick base with brick dressings and a tiled roof. The outer bays project forward and are gabled. The second bay projects less, contains a two-storey bay window, and has a weatherboarded upper floor and gable.	II
9–21 Water Street; 53.35279°N 2.99179°W		1912	A terrace of seven houses by William and Segar Owen in two storeys and extending for 13 bays, the outer bays projecting under gables. The houses have a brick base with pebbledashing in the upper parts, and the roofs are tiled. The central bays have a tiled canopy between the floors. The windows are casements, most are mullioned, and there also some canted bay windows.	II

=== Grayson and Ould ===
Name and location	Photograph	Date	Notes	Grade
15 Bolton Road; 53.35111°N 2.99782°W		1890	A house by Grayson and Ould in one storey with an attic and two bays on each front. The ground floor is in brick with tile-hanging and some pebbledashing above, and a tiled roof. In the ground floor are canted bay windows, and above are gables with half-dormers; one gable is pargetted.	II
83–87 Greendale Road; 53.34959°N 2.99802°W		1891	A terrace of five houses by Grayson and Ould in one storey with attics and five bays. It is in brick with stone dressings, tile-hanging in the gables, and a tiled roof. The upper floor windows are either in the two gables or in gabled half-dormers.	II
88 and 88A Greendale Road; 53.34946°N 2.99782°W		1891	This was built as a post office and house by Grayson and Ould, and later used as a tea shop. It is in two storeys and has fronts of two bays. The building is timber-framed on a brick base and has a tiled roof. The upper storey is jettied and gabled. In the ground floor are shop windows, and above is an oriel window and a roundel.	II
50 Park Road; 53.35089°N 2.99434°W		1895	A house by Grayson and Ould in two storeys and three bays. It is timber-framed on a brick base and has a tiled roof. In the first and second bays both the upper storeys and the gable are jettied. On the left side is a recessed two-storey porch surmounted by a small shingled broach spire with a button finial.	II
2–8 Poets' Corner, 52 Park Road; 53.35088°N 2.99404°W		1895	A terrace of five houses by Grayson and Ould. They are in a single storey with attics, the lower storey in brick with stone dressings, and the upper storey largely plastered. The houses have a four-bay front. The first bay projects forward, the fourth bay is recessed, and both are gabled. The other bays have gabled half-dormers. On the right side of the fourth bay is an oriel window.	II
1–8 Riverside; 53.35200°N 2.99482°W		1895	A terrace of eight houses by Grayson and Ould. They are in a single storey with attics and eight bays. The terrace has a stone base, the ground floors are in brick, the upper floor is rendered and the roofs are tiled. The middle and outer bays project forward and are gabled; the other bays have gabled dormers. In the central bay are canted oriel windows, the other windows are casements with stone sills and lintels. Between the floors, the outer bays have diapering, and the others have a Lombard frieze.	II
27–35 Wood Street; 53.35015°N 2.99487°W		1895	A terrace of five houses by Grayson and Ould in a single storey with attics and five bays. They are in brick with stone dressings and have a tiled roof. The outer and central bays project forward and have crow-stepped gables each containing a roundel. The other bays have dormers and scrolled gables.	II
37–47 Wood Street; 53.35039°N 2.99455°W		1895	A terrace of six houses by Grayson and Ould in a single storey with attics and six bays. They are in brick on a stone base with stone dressings and have a tiled roof. The ground floor has five-light windows under elliptical heads and contains casements. The upper floor windows have three lights and are in dormers in crow-stepped gables. The sides also have crow-stepped gables.	II
1–9 Cross Street, 1 Bath Street, 20 Bolton Road; 53.35137°N 2.99615°W		1896	A terrace of eight houses by Grayson and Ould in one storey with attics and ten bays. They are in brick with stone and terracotta dressings and tiled roofs; the upper floor has diapering. The end bays are recessed, the next bays also recessed but less; all are gabled. The other bays contain half-dormers decorated by terracotta crocketed gables with finials and traceried parapets.	II
45–55 Bebington Road; 53.35911°N 2.99936°W		1897	A terrace of six houses by Grayson and Ould in one storey with attics and six bays. They are in brick with stone dressings and have a tiled roof. The first bay projects forward under a gable with datestone and a finial and the fifth bay is also gabled. The other upper floor windows are in dormers.	II
55–59 Corniche Road; 53.35416°N 2.99343°W		1898	Three houses by Grayson and Ould in one storey with attics and three bays. They are plastered on a brick base and have a tiled roof. In the ground floor is a tiled canopy and oriel windows with plastered gables. The upper floor has dormers with tile-hung gables.	II
12–20 Lodge Lane, 1–5 Knox Close; 53.35625°N 2.99490°W		1898	A terrace of ten flats by Grayson and Ould in two storeys and eight bays. They are in brick with a slate roof and a tile ridge. Two bays project forward under pedimented gables each containing a roundel. Between the gables is a round pediment containing a shield.	II
230 and 232 New Chester Road; 53.35547°N 2.99321°W		1898	Two houses by Grayson and Ould in one storey with attics and two bays. The lower floor is in brick, the upper floor is plastered, and the roof is tiled. The windows are canted oriels, those in the upper floor in gabled half-dormers.	II
234–238 New Chester Road; 53.35530°N 2.99310°W		1898	Three houses by Grayson and Ould in one storey with attics and three bays. The lower floor is in brick, the upper floor is plastered, and the roof is tiled. In the upper floor are three flat-topped half-dormers.	II
240 and 242 New Chester Road; 53.35515°N 2.99294°W		1898	A pair of houses by Grayson and Ould in one storey with attics and two bays. The lower floor is in brick, the upper floor is plastered, and the roof is tiled. In the ground floor are canted bay windows. The upper floor has half-dormers with terracotta decoration, including crockets, finials and traceried parapets.	II
288–292 New Chester Road; 53.35341°N 2.99154°W		1898	Three houses by Grayson and Ould in two storeys and four bays. The right two bays project forward, are plastered, contain oriel windows in the lower floor, and have jettied upper floors and tile-hung gables. The lower storey of the left two bays is in brick with a bay window. The upper floor is plastered and has half-dormers with terracotta decoration, including crockets, finials and traceried parapets.	II
302 and 304 New Chester Road; 53.35284°N 2.99111°W		1898	A pair of houses by Grayson and Ould in one storey with an attic and two bays. The ground floor is in brick with stone dressings. The house has a gambrel roof sweeping down over the upper floor to form canopies over the doorways. The upper floor windows are in dormers with tile-hung gables.	II
310 and 312 New Chester Road; 53.35252°N 2.99078°W		1898	A pair of houses by Grayson and Ould in one storey with an attic and three bays. The lower floor is in brick with stone dressings, the upper floor is plastered, and the roof is tiled. The left bay projects forward and has a gable with diapering. The other windows are in gabled half-dormers with diapering beneath them and a round window between.	II
314–318 New Chester Road; 53.35230°N 2.99061°W		1898	Three houses by Grayson and Ould in two storeys with three bays. They are in brick with stone dressings and have a tiled roof. On the sides of the houses are parapets. Above the upper floor windows are plastered gables with diapering.	II
320 and 322 Chester Road; 53.35215°N 2.99046°W		1898	A pair of houses by Grayson and Ould in one storey with an attic and three bays. The lower floor is in brick with stone dressings, the upper floor is plastered, and the roof is tiled. The right bay projects forward and has a gable with diapering. The other windows are in gabled half-dormers with diapering beneath them and a round window between.	II
324 and 326 New Chester Road; 53.35193°N 2.99029°W		1898	A pair of houses by Grayson and Ould in one storey with an attic and five bays. The outer bays are gabled, that on the right being jettied. The houses are plastered on a brick base, the gables are tile-hung with a timbered apex. The upper windows are in half-dormers, and below are a bow window and an oriel window.	II
41–53 Pool Bank; 53.35704°N 2.99586°W		1898–99	A terrace of seven houses by Grayson and Ould in one storey with an attic and seven bays. They are in brick with a tiled roof. Te outer and central bays project forward and have shaped gables. The other bays have half-dormers with tile-hung gables.	II
2–8 Boundary Road; 53.35917°N 2.99893°W		1899	A terrace of four houses by Grayson and Ould in one storey with an attic and four bays. The ground floor is in brick with stone dressings, the upper storey is timber-framed, and the roof is tiled. The central two bays project forward and contain two-storey oriel windows above which are gables. Flanking these in the upper floor are half-dormers.	II
18–24 Greendale Road; 53.35473°N 3.00066°W		1899	A terrace of seven houses by Grayson and Ould in one storey with an attic and five bays. It is in brick with a tiled roof. The middle three bays project forward, the central one of these being under a shaped gable. The upper floor windows are in shaped half-dormers, some of which are double. The outer doorways have canopies.	II
192–198 New Chester Road; 53.35713°N 2.99450°W		1899	A terrace of four houses by Grayson and Ould with two storeys and four bays. The ground floor is in brick, the upper storey is plastered, and the roof is tiled. The central bays project forward, contain bay windows in the lower floor, the jettied upper floor has oriel windows and is gabled. The lower floor in the other bays also has oriel windows.	II
69–75 Pool Bank, 6–9 Knox Close; 53.35632°N 2.99529°W		1899	A terrace of eight flats by Grayson and Ould in two storeys and six bays. They are in brick with a slate roof and a tile ridge. The central two bays project forward and contain two-storey bay windows. The sides have pedimented gables with bull's eye windows.	II
14–16 Church Drive, 25–27 Windy Bank; 53.35469°N 2.99697°W		1900–02	Six houses by Grayson and Ould in two storeys and 14 bays. They are in red brick with bands of blue brick and have tiled roofs. The outer two bays on each side are recessed, and the central four bays project forward under a large segmental pediment. The pediment contains pargetting and the date 1900.	II
5–10 Brook Street; 53.35712°N 3.00076°W		1901	Six houses by Grayson and Ould in two storeys and seven bays. They are mainly roughcast on a brick base with some timber-framing and a tiled roof. The first and second bays have a jettied upper storey, the second and last bays are gabled, and in the central bays are bay windows and gabled half-dormers.	II
6K and 7 Greendale Road; 53.35583°N 3.00109°W		1901	Two houses by Grayson and Ould in two storeys with two bays on each front. They are timber-framed on a brick base with some plaster and have tiled roofs. The upper storey is jettied, and the building has a doorway with a Tudor head.	II
8–10 Greendale Road; 53.35569°N 3.00114°W		1901	Three houses by Grayson and Ould in two storeys and four bays. They are roughcast on a brick base with tiled roofs. In the centre of the front is a tiled canopy. On the left side is a shaped gable and a bull's eye window, and on the right side is a bay window.	II
30–32 Greendale Road; 53.35415°N 3.00032°W		1901	Three houses by Grayson and Ould in one storey with an attic and three bays. They are in brick with stone dressings and a tiled roof. There are three half-dormers in coped gables with ball finials on the kneelers.	II
40–43 Greendale Road; 53.35353°N 3.00000°W		1901	Four houses by Grayson and Ould in two storeys and six bays. The lower storey is in brick, the upper floor is roughcast, and the roof is tiled. The second and fourth bays project forward under pedimented gables. In the upper floor of the middle two bays are oriel windows and bull's eyes windows.	II
49-53, Greendale Road; 53.3524°N 2.9992°W		1901	9 houses by Grayson and Ould. Roughcast on brick base. One storey with attic, 5 bays, end bays project. Some stone dressings and some timber-framing to 1st floor, tile roofs.	II
1–7 Lower Road; 53.35673°N 2.99995°W		1901	Four houses by Grayson and Ould in one storey with an attic and four bays. They are roughcast on a brick base and have tiled roofs. Two bays have two-storey bay windows, one has a single storey bay window, and there are two dormers.	II
37–45 Primrose Hill; 53.35695°N 3.00001°W		1901	A terrace of five houses by Grayson and Ould in one storey with an attic and five bays. They are roughcast on a brick base and have a tiled roof. The fourth bay projects under a tile-hung gable. The first and third bays have two-storey bay windows, and in the second and fifth bay are single-storey bay windows and pedimented dormers.	II
6–11 Windy Bank; 53.35536°N 3.00021°W		1902	A terrace of six houses by Grayson and Ould in one storey with attics and seven bays. They are roughcast on a brick base, have tile-hanging in the apexes of the gables, and tiled roofs. The second and last bays project forward under gables, and between these is a first-floor canopy with gablets.	II
12–18 Windy Bank; 53.35511°N 2.99966°W		1902	A terrace of seven houses by Grayson and Ould in two storeys and eleven bays. They are roughcast on a brick base, they have timber-framed gables, and tiled roofs. Features include gables of differing sizes, raking half-dormers, and tiled canopies over some doorways.	II
3–11 Boundary Road; 53.35938°N 2.99812°W		c. 1905	A terrace of five houses by Grayson and Ould. They were destroyed in the war and rebuilt in 1947. The houses are in two storeys and have a front of five bays and a single-storey bay on the left, They are roughcast on a brick base with some timber-framing and have tiled roofs. Two bays project forward and are gabled.	II
13–31 Boundary Road; 53.35932°N 2.99755°W		c. 1905	A terrace of ten houses by Grayson and Ould in two storeys and ten bays. They are roughcast on a brick base and have tiled roofs. The central two bays project forward and have a jettied timber-framed upper storey under a gable. The second and ninth bays also project forward with a jettied upper floor containing an oriel window and a gable.	II
33 Boundary Road; 53.35916°N 2.99718°W		c. 1905	This originated as a shop by Grayson and Ould. It is in two storeys with an attic and two bays under a gable. The building is roughcast on a brick base and has a tiled roof. In the ground floor are Tuscan pilasters flanking two bow windows and a pedimented doorway.	II
35 Boundary Road; 53.35913°N 2.99706°W		c. 1905	A shop by Grayson and Ould in two bays on a brick base with tiled roofs. The left bay is in two storeys, with a three-light bow window in the lower storey and a timber-framed and gabled upper storey. To the right is a single-storey roughcast bay with a porch.	II
37–43 Boundary Road; 53.35920°N 2.99685°W		c. 1905	A terrace of four houses by Grayson and Ould in one storey with attics and eight bays. The ground floor is roughcast on a brick base, the upper parts are tile-hung, and the roof is tiled. Two pairs of bays project forward and are gabled. Over the doors are tile-hung canopies.	II
45 and 47 Boundary Road; 53.35925°N 2.99661°W		1905	A pair of houses by Grayson and Ould in two storeys and two bays under two gables. The lower storey is in brick, the upper storey is roughcast, and the roof is tiled.	II
6–13 Church Drive; 53.35429°N 2.99670°W		1905	Eight houses by Grayson and Ould in two storeys and eight bays. They were largely destroyed in the war and rebuilt in 1947. The lower storey is in brick with stone dressings, the upper floor is roughcast, the upper parts of the gables are tile-hung, and the roof is tiled. The central two bays project under asymmetrical gables, the outer bays are also gabled, and between them are gabled half-dormers.	II
3 and 4 Brook Street; 53.35745°N 3.00123°W		1906	Two houses by Grayson and Ould in two storeys and four bays. The lower storey is pebbledashed on a brick base, the upper floor is tile-hung, and the roof is tiled. Each central bay has a two-storey bay window with a jettied timber-framed gable above. The tile-hanging sweeps down to form canopies over the doorways.	II
18–26 Circular Drive, 2–6 Pool Bank; 53.35836°N 2.99755°W		1906	A terrace of eight houses by Grayson and Ould in two storeys twelve bays extending round a corner site. The ground floor is pebbledashed with brick dressings, the upper floor is jettied and tile-hung, there is some timber-framing, and the roofs are tiled. The corner bay is canted with a turret-like ogival roof. Other features include oriel windows, Venetian windows, and half-dormers.	II
8–14 Pool Bank; 53.35806°N 2.99732°W		1906	A terrace of four houses by Grayson and Ould in one storey with attics and six bays. They are pebbledashed with a gambrel tiled roof. The outer bays have shaped gables with Venetian windows in the upper floor, and the roof sweeps down over the other bays. It forms a canopy over the central door, which is flanked by oriel windows.	II
16–22 Pool Bank; 53.35782°N 2.99714°W		1907	A terrace of four houses by Grayson and Ould in one storey with attics and six bays; the roof is tiled. The outer bays are pebbledashed and gabled. The other bays have a gambrel roof extending over the upper floor and forming canopies over the doorways. The ground floor is pebbledashed on a brick base.	II
24–34 Pool Bank; 53.35755°N 2.99691°W		1907	A terrace of six houses by Grayson and Ould in one storey with attics and twelve bays. The houses are pebbledashed on a brick base with stone dressings and have tiled roofs with deep eaves. In the roof are two timber-framed gables and dormers. The windows are casements, and in the ground floor are canted bay windows, between which are benches.	II
23 and 24 Windy Bank; 53.35481°N 2.99736°W		1907	A pair of houses by Grayson and Ould in two storeys and three bay. They are in brick with stone dressings, and have a slate roof with ridge tiles. The left bay projects forward and is gabled, the middle bay has a crow-stepped gable and contains a dormer and a roundel, and the third bay consists of a round tower with an octagonal spire.	II

=== John Douglas ===
Name and location	Photograph	Date	Notes	Grade
19 and 21 Park Road; 53.35016°N 2.99704°W		1892	A pair of houses by Douglas and Fordham in two storeys and six bays. The lower storeys are in brick with stone dressings, and the jettied upper story is timber-framed. The outer bays project forward and have jettied gables, no 21 having the date 1892 carved into the oak. In the ground floor are bay windows, and in the upper floor there are oriels. The entrances are round-headed.	II
3–9 Bridge Street; 53.35000°N 2.99529°W		1894	A terrace of four houses by Douglas and Fordham in two storeys and six bays. They are in brick with terracotta dressings and tiled roofs. The outer bays project, are canted, and have hipped roofs with finials. The central bays have a canopy and shaped gables with ball finials, the central two gables being larger and containing a roundel.	II
17–23 Wood Street; 53.34939°N 2.99584°W		1894	A terrace of four houses by Douglas and Fordham. They are in two storeys and four gabled bays. The upper floor is jettied on timber Doric columns. The ground floor is in brick and contains canted bay windows. The upper floor is rendered with granite chips, and contains canted oriel windows. The gables are also jettied, each contains a roundel, and they have plaster pargetting.	II
128–132 New Chester Road; 53.35887°N 2.99601°W		1897	A terrace of three houses by Douglas and Minshull in two storeys and three gabled bays, the right bay being recessed. They are in brick with some diapering, plastered gables, and tiled roofs. Between the floors is a band of plaster panels.	II
49–55 Wood Street; 53.35066°N 2.99423°W		1895	A terrace of four houses by Douglas and Fordham. They are in two storeys, and have an eight-bay front with four gables. The houses are built in brick, with diapering in the upper floor, granite chip rendering in the gables, and a tiled roof. The windows are mullioned.	II
71–75 Bolton Road; 53.35408°N 2.99226°W		1898	Three houses by Douglas and Minshull in two storeys and three bays in an irregular plan. The lower storey is in brick, the upper storey plastered, the gables tile-hung, and the roofs tiled. The first two bays are gabled, the first with an upper floor oriel window, the second with a jettied upper storey and a ground floor bay window.	II
7–15 Corniche Road; 53.35545°N 2.99436°W		1898	Five houses by Douglas and Fordham in two storeys, the houses set at right angles to each other. The lower storeys are in brick, the upper floors are plastered, and the roofs are tiled. The houses are gabled, some have two-storey oriel windows, and the doors have decorated lintels.	II
244–248 New Chester Road; 53.35499°N 2.99282°W		1898	Three houses by Douglas and Fordham in two storeys and three bays. The lower storey is in brick, the upper storey is pebbledashed, and the roof is tiled. In the lower floor the windows are small-paned casements, and above they are oriels.	II
268–274 New Chester Road; 53.35427°N 2.99216°W		1898	Four houses by Douglas and Minshull in two storeys with a front of four bays. The lower storey is in brick, the upper jettied storey is plastered, and the roof is tiled. The first bay is recessed, it contains a canted bay window, and the other bays have oriel windows in the upper floor.	II
284 and 286 New Chester Road; 53.35357°N 2.99162°W		1898	A pair of houses by Douglas and Fordham in one storey with an attic and two bays. The lower storey is in brick, the upper storey is in stone-chip roughcast, and the hipped roof is tiled. The windows in the ground floor are in canted bay windows, and those above are in small pargetted gables.	II
294 and 296 New Chester Road; 53.35321°N 2.99131°W		1898	A pair of houses by Douglas and Fordham in two storeys and two bays. The lower storey is in brick and contains canted bay windows. The upper storey is jettied and shingled its windows having small plastered gables. The roof is tiled.	II
10–16 Boundary Road; 53.35889°N 2.99635°W		1899	A terrace of four houses by Douglas and Fordham in two storeys and four bays. They are in two storeys with a tiled roof. The central two bays project forward under two gables; the fourth bay has a larger gable, and the first bay contains a bay window. Between the floor are bands of decorative plaster panels with diapering.	II
55–67 Pool Bank; 53.35667°N 2.99554°W		1899	A terrace of seven houses by Douglas and Minshull in two storeys and seven bays. The ground floor is in brick, the upper floor is pebbledashed, and the roof is tiled. The outer two bays on each side project forward and each is gabled. The ground floor windows are mullioned, and in the upper floor are casement windows, those in the middle three bays being in gabled half-dormers.	II
6–14 Primrose Hill; 53.35827°N 2.99887°W		1899	A terrace of five houses by Douglas and Minshull in two storeys and five bays. They are in brick with some pebbledashing, and have a tiled roof. The end bays project forward under hipped gabled roofs. The bays between have a canopy over the ground floor and two-storey bay windows. The windows are casement windows.	II

=== Simpson ===
Name and location	Photograph	Date	Notes	Grade
31–35 Corniche Road; 53.35487°N 2.99397°W		1897	Three houses by Jonathan Simpson in one storey with an attic and three bays. The ground floor is in brick and the roof is tiled. The first bay projects forward, is jettied, and has a plaster gable with pargetting. The ground floor contains bay windows, and there is a flat-topped dormer above.	II
298 and 300 New Chester Road; 53.35303°N 2.99122°W		1898	A pair of houses by Jonathan Simpson in one storey with an attic and two bays. The lower storey is in brick with stone dressings, the jettied upper parts are partly timber-framed and partly plastered, and the roof is tiled. The upper floor windows are in gabled half-dormers.	II
30–38 Primrose Hill; 53.35769°N 2.99973°W		1899	A terrace of five houses by Jonathan Simpson in two storeys and five bays. The lower floor is in brick and contains bay windows. The upper storey has three roughcast gables with tiled gambrel roof between containing dormers. One gable has a pargetted panel in Art Nouveau style.	II
46–64 Central Road; 53.35636°N 2.99786°W		1906	Ten houses by James Lomax-Simpson in two storeys and ten bays. They are plastered on a brick base and have tiled roofs. The outer two bays on each side project forward under gables, and the central two bays are under asymmetrical gables.	II
35-49 Lower Road; 53.3562°N 2.9981°W		1906	Terrace of 8 houses by J. Lomax Simpson. Plaster on brick base, tile-hanging and tile roof. 2 storeys, 8 bays.	II
51–59 Lower Road, 66–72 Central Road; 53.35591°N 2.99765°W		1906	A terrace of nine houses forming a curved plan by James Lomax-Simpson. They are in two storeys and seven bays. The central houses are timber-framed on a brick base, and the outer ones have a roughcast lower storey with weatherboarding above. The roofs are in stone-slate.	II
29–33 Lower Road; 53.35620°N 2.99870°W		1907	Three houses by James Lomax-Simpson in two storeys and four bays and a projecting bay on the left. They are plastered on a brick base, with tile-hanging and a tiled roof. Features include a two-storey bay window and an oriel window, both canted.	II
5–20 King George's Drive; 53.35420°N 2.99769°W		1913	A terrace of 15 houses by James Lomax-Simpson in two storeys. The central seven-bay section has a roughcast lower storey, and weatherboarding in the upper storey; in the centre is a triple gable. The wings consist of houses with a brick lower storeys with stone dressings, and a roughcast upper floor, outside which are timber-framed houses.	II
23–30 Queen Mary's Drive; 53.35461°N 2.99937°W		1913	A terrace of eight houses by James Lomax-Simpson in two storeys and eight bays. The outer two bays at each end project forward under asymmetrical gables with jettied apexes, and are roughcast with a brick base. The other bays are in brick, and the roof is tiled. Some of the upper floor windows are oriels.	II
31–46 Queen Mary's Drive; 53.35396°N 2.99920°W		1913	A terrace of 15 houses by James Lomax-Simpson in two storeys and a total of 27 bays, eleven of which are recessed. The roofs are in stone-slate, with a variety of materials below. Most have a brick lower storey and a jettied and weatherboarded upper floor, some houses are timber-framed and others are roughcast. Features include gables and oriel windows.	II
47–50 Queen Mary's Drive, 13–17 The Causeway, 1–9 Causeway Close; 53.35327°N 2.99868°W		1913	A group of nine houses, later flats by James Lomax-Simpson in an L-shaped plan. They are in two storeys, and vary in design, mainly in brick with stone dressings, some of it roughcast, and with tiled roofs. Features include gables, some jettying, stone quoins, a bay window, and casement windows, some with lattice glazing.	II
8–11 The Causeway, 1–4 King George's Drive; 53.35348°N 2.99748°W		1913	Nine houses by James Lomax-Simpson on two sides of a corner in two storeys. They are in brick with some roughcast, and have tiled roofs. Features include brick diapering, gables, bay windows, and a panel inscribed with the date.	II
19–22 Windy Bank; 53.35488°N 2.99791°W		1913	A terrace of four houses by James Lomax-Simpson in two storeys and four bays plus two bays on the left side. They are roughcast on a brick base and have tiled roofs. There are three bay windows, two of which have panels above and projecting windows in the upper storey.	II
1–5 The Ginnel, 4 Water Street, 60 and 62 Bolton Road; 53.35300°N 2.99290°W		1914	Seven houses curving round a corner by James Lomax-Simpson in two storeys and 13 bays. They are in a variety of materials, brick, roughcast, and tile-hanging, and have tiled roofs. The features include jettied bays on posts with half-dormers above, gables, single- and two-storey bay windows, and flat canopies above doorways.	II
7–23 The Ginnel; 53.35254°N 2.99293°W		1914	A terrace of nine houses by James Lomax-Simpson in two storeys and nine bays. They are in brick up to the level of the sills, roughcast above, and have tiled roofs. Features include pedimented gables decorated with wreathes and festoons, a Tuscan colonnade, and an oriel window.	II
25–35 The Ginnel; 53.35226°N 2.99319°W		1914	A terrace of six houses by James Lomax-Simpson in two storeys and six bays. They are mainly roughcast on a brick base and have tiled roofs. The upper floor is jettied, and the second and sixth bays have timber-framed upper floors and gables. Above the doorways are flat canopies or gables.	II
47–53 Primrose Hill; 53.35653°N 3.00084°W		1925	A terrace of four houses by James Lomax-Simpson in two storeys and six bays. The lower storey is in brick, the upper floor is tile-hung, and the roof is tiled. The outer bays project forward under gables and contain bay windows. Across the front of the other bays between the storeys is a canopy).	II
10–14 Queen Mary's Drive; 53.35641°N 3.00047°W		1925	A terrace of five houses by James Lomax-Simpson in two storeys and five bays. They are mainly plastered with a brick base and a tiled roof. The upper storey is jettied, and there are three jettied gables. In the ground floor are bay windows. To the left is a screen wall with a niche, which is included in the listing.	II
3–6 Greendale Road, 55 and 57 Primrose Hill; 53.35637°N 3.00139°W		1926	A terrace of six houses by James Lomax-Simpson on a corner site in two storeys and twelve bays. It is in brick with tiled roofs, and has pedimented gables. The canopies over the doorways are either flat or in the form of a shell hood.	II
6A–6H Greendale Road; 53.35607°N 3.00103°W		1926	A terrace of eight houses by James Lomax-Simpson in two storeys and 13 bays. The outer houses are timber-framed; the others have a lower storey in brick and the jettied upper storey is roughcast; the roofs are tiled. In the centre are two bay windows.	II
15–22 Queen Mary's Drive, 5 Windy Bank; 53.35595°N 3.00040°W		1926	A terrace of nine houses by James Lomax-Simpson in two storeys and nine bays on a corner site. They are timber-framed on a brick base and have a stone-slate roof. The upper storey is jettied.	II
1 and 3 Windy Bank; 53.35567°N 3.00083°W		1926	A pair of houses by James Lomax-Simpson in two storeys and four bays. They are in brick with a tiled roof. In the central bays of the upper storey are rectangular oriel windows with panels beneath, flanking strips, and cornices. On each side of the houses is a brick wall containing a niche and raised coping; these are included in the listing.	II
2 and 4 Windy Bank; 53.35537°N 3.00063°W		c. 1926	A pair of houses by James Lomax-Simpson. They are roughcast with some brick and have tiled roofs. The houses are in two storeys and three bays. The first two bays project forward under gables, and the third bay has a timbered gabled half-dormer. The first two bays have canted bay windows. On each side of the houses is a brick wall containing a niche and raised coping; these are included in the listing.	II
Duke of York's Cottages and Laundry; 53.35685°N 3.00133°W		1933	A terrace of 19 pensioners' cottages and a laundry by James Lomax-Simpson fronting Greendale Road, Primrose Hill and Brook Street. They are in two storeys with stone-slate roofs, and have a variety of building materials, including plaster or brick with stone dressings, stone, and timber-framing.	II
1–7 Jubilee Crescent; 53.35225°N 2.99683°W		1938	A terrace of seven houses by James Lomax-Simpson in two storeys and 13 bays. The ground floor is in brick, the upper storey is tile-hung, and the roofs are tiled. The upper storey and the gables are jettied, and in the ground floor are bay windows.	II
8–15 Jubilee Crescent; 53.35273°N 2.99669°W		1938	A terrace of eight houses by James Lomax-Simpson in two storeys and 14 bays in a crescent plan. They are in brick with stone dressings, some plaster and weatherboarding, and have tiled roofs. Some of the upper floors and gables are jettied. Other features include bay windows and gabled dormers.	II

=== Other ===
Name and location	Photograph	Date	Notes	Grade
9–15 Wood Street; 53.34919°N 2.99615°W		1892	A terrace of four houses in two storeys and four bays; the roof is tiled. The gabled outer bays project forward, they are timber-framed on a stone base, the upper storey is jettied and one gable inscribed with the date. The lower storey of the central bay is in stone, and the upper storey has decorative timber-framing.	II
8–14 Bridge Street; 53.35048°N 2.99716°W		1894	A terrace of houses destroyed in the war and rebuilt in 1947. They are in two storeys and six gabled bays. The houses are timber-framed on a stone base and have a tiled roof. The outer bays project forward the left one with an oriel window, and the right one with a shingled gable and a bay window.	II
97–100 Greendale Road; 53.34880°N 2.99675°W		1894	A terrace of four houses in one storey with an attic and four bays. The lower storey is in brick, the upper has granite-chip rendering with some diapering, and the roof is tiled. There are two gables and a gabled half-dormer. The entrances have pedimented canopies.	II
26 Park Road, 1 Bridge Street; 53.35023°N 2.99543°W		1894	A pair of houses in two storeys with an irregular three-bay front. The ground floor is in brick with terracotta dressings, the upper storey is jettied and timber-framed, and the roofs are tiled. The houses have oriel windows, and decorated bressumers and bargeboards.	II
38–48 Park Road; 53.35069°N 2.99465°W		1895	A terrace of six houses by T. M. Lockwood. They are in two storeys, the lower storey being in brick and the upper storey timber-framed and jettied. The houses have a six-bay front, the outer bays and the two central bays being gabled. The gabled bays have a rectangular bay window and a canted oriel window above; the other bays have a canted bay window. The windows are casements.	II
3–33 Bath Street, 9–10 Riverside; 53.35160°N 2.99508°W		1897	A group of 18 houses by J. J. Talbot arranged on three sides of a lawn and curving round a corner. They are in two storeys and each house has a single-bay front, they are in brick with stone dressings and have tiled roofs. Many are gabled and some gables are shaped. Other features include half-dormers, diapering, roofs sloping down to form canopies, and bay windows.	II
178–190 New Chester Road; 53.35737°N 2.99478°W		1897	A terrace of seven houses by Ernest George and Yeates in two storeys. In the centre are three bays, and two bay protrude forward on each side. The houses are roughcast on a brick base and have a tiled roof. In the centre is a two-storey bay window with a pargetted gable.	II
37–41 Corniche Road; 53.35471°N 2.99384°W		1898	Three houses by Wilson and Talbot in two storeys and three bays. The lower storey is in brick, and the house has a tiled roof. The first two bays project forward under a tile-hung gambrel gable. The other bay is plastered and has a gablet.	II
43–47 Corniche Road; 53.35452°N 2.99368°W		1898	Three houses by T. T. Rees in two storeys and three bays. The lower storey is in brick on a stone base, the upper storey is plastered, and the roof is tiled. There is a central bay window in the ground floor, and above are three oriel windows, each in a jettied gable.	II
61–67 Corniche Road; 53.35394°N 2.99332°W		1898	Four houses by Huon A. Matear in one storey with an attic and four bays. It is in brick with a tiled gambrel roof. In the left bay is a round projection with a steep roof and a finial. The right bay is gabled, and between are round-headed entrances and flat-topped dormers.	II
306 and 308 New Chester Road; 53.35232°N 2.99062°W		1898	A pair of houses by T. T. Rees in two storeys and two bays. They are in brick with a tiled roof. The left bay projects forward under a diapered gable. In the right bay is a bay window. On the left side is a two-storey timber-framed porch.	II
67–79 Bebington Road; 53.35857°N 3.00013°W		1899	A terrace of seven houses by Ernest Newton in a single storey with attics and seven bays. The ground floor is in stone and the upper parts are pebbledashed. The outer and central bays project forward, are gabled and the roofs sweep down to form porches. The other bays have gabled half-dormers.	II
81–87 Bebington Road; 53.35827°N 3.00055°W		1899	Four houses by T. M. Lockwood with two storeys and four bays. The lower storey is in brick and the roof is tiled. The middle two bays project forward with a canted bay window in the lower floor and a timber-framed gable above. The outer bays have a two-storey bay window with tile-hanging in the upper storey.	II
89–97 Bebington Road; 53.35804°N 3.00081°W		1899	A terrace of five houses by J. J. Talbot in one storey with attics and five bays. The ground floor is in brick on a stone base, the upper floor is partly plastered, and there is a gambrel tiled roof. The outer bays project forward, have a jettied upper floor, and are gabled. The other bays have oriel windows in the ground floor and gabled dormers above; all the gables have finials.	II
17–23 Corniche Road; 53.35521°N 2.99428°W		1899	A terrace of four houses by Edwin Lutyens in two storeys and four bays. The middle two bays are roughcast on a brick base, are gabled and contain Venetian windows. The other bays have a brick lower storey with tile-hanging above. The porches are canted with doors set diagonally.	II
25–29 Corniche Road; 53.35505°N 2.99409°W		1899	Three houses by Wilson and Talbot in two storeys and three bays. The lower storey is in brick, there are stone dressings including quoins, the upper floor is plastered, and the roof is tiled. The outer bays project forward under hipped gables. The central bay contains a porch, a bay window and an oriel window.	II
49–53 Corniche Road; 53.35435°N 2.99360°W		1899	Three houses by Edmund Kirby in one storey with an attic and three bays. It is in brick with a tiled roof. It has two lateral gables between which is a hipped dormer in the roof that sweeps down to form a canopy above the ground floor.	II
59–63 Greendale Road; 53.35158°N 2.99903°W		1899	A terrace of five houses by Maurice B. Adams in two storeys and five bays. The ground floor is in brick, the jettied upper storey is pebbledashed, the gables are tile-hung, and the roof is tiled. All the bays are gabled, the gables on the outer bays being larger and asymmetrical, and there is an oriel window.	II
148–156 New Chester Road; 53.35823°N 2.99549°W		1899	A terrace of five houses by Huon A. Matear in two storeys with attics and seven bays. The ground floor is in brick, the upper storey is mainly plastered, and the roof is tiled. The attics are in the second and third houses, they are under asymmetrical tile-hung gables, and contain two-storey oriel windows.	II
158–168 New Chester Road; 53.35795°N 2.99524°W		1899	A terrace of six houses by Harry Beswick in one storey with attics. The lower floor is in brick with stone dressings, the upper floor is pebbledashed, and the roof is tiled. There is a terracotta frieze between the floors. The outer two bays on each side project forward under plastered gables and contain an oriel window in the upper floor. Between them are gabled half-dormers.	II
200–210 New Chester Road; 53.35680°N 2.99429°W		1899	A terrace of six houses by Huon A. Matear in one storey with attics and six bays. They are in brick with a tile gambrel roof. The first bay projects forward under a gable and has a bay window. The two bays at the right end also project forward and have shaped gables. Between these bays are flat-topped dormers on rectangular bases.	II
19–25 Pool Bank; 53.35777°N 2.99645°W		c. 1899	A terrace of five houses by Huon A. Matear in one storey with attics and five bays. The lower parts are in brick, the upper parts are pebbledashed, and the roof is tiled. The central bay projects forward, is canted, and has a shaped parapet. The other bays have canopies over the lower floor and raking half-dormers above.	II
27–39 Pool Bank; 53.35744°N 2.99620°W		1899	A terrace of seven houses by Wilson and Talbot in two storeys and seven bays. They are pebbledashed with brick dressings and have a tiled roof. The outer bays project forward under gables. In the ground floor of the outer and alternate bays between are bow windows. The doorways are round-headed.	II
16–28 Primrose Hill; 53.35800°N 2.99933°W		1899	A terrace of seven houses by Huon A. Matear in one storey with attics and seven bays. They are pebbledashed on a brick base with timber-framed gables and have a tiled roof. The outer bays project forward under gables. The roof sweeps down to form canopies over the lower floor, and in the roof are raking dormers.	II
40–50 Primrose Hill; 53.35740°N 3.00004°W		1899	A terrace of six houses by Edmund Kirby in two storeys and six bays. They are in brick with tiled roofs. The two central bays and the outer bays are gabled with plastered diapering, and between are flat-topped dormers. The roof sweeps down to form canopies over the doorways.	II
52–56 Primrose Hill; 53.35716°N 3.00035°W		1899	Three houses by Maurice B. Adams in two storeys and three bays. The lower storey is in brick, the upper floor is tile-hung, and the roof is tiled. In the centre is a large timber-framed gable with tile-hanging in the apex. The entrances are round-headed.	II
134–140 New Chester Road; 53.35865°N 2.99580°W		1900	A terrace of four houses by Wilson and Talbot in two storeys and five bays. The ground floor is plastered on a stone base and has stone dressings. The upper floor is tile-hung. Three of the bays project forward and are gabled.	II
142–146 New Chester Road; 53.35851°N 2.99567°W		1900	A terrace of three houses by Wilson and Talbot in two storeys and five bays. The ground floor is in brick with stone dressings, the upper storey is timber-framed and the roof is tiled. The first bay projects and is gabled, with an oriel window. The other bays have a jettied upper storey on Tuscan columns, bow windows, and two gablets.	II
44–48 Greendale Road, 18–22 The Causeway; 53.35313°N 2.99976°W		1900–01	A group of ten houses forming an L-shaped plan by Wilson and Talbot. They are in two storeys and have five bays on each front. The houses are in brick with stone dressings and some timber-framing, and have tiled roofs. Features include gables, a ball finial and an oriel window.	II
25–29 Greendale Road; 53.35443°N 3.00046°W		1901	A terrace of five houses by Ernest George and Yeates in two storeys and five bays. The ground floor is in brick, the upper floor is roughcast, and the roof is tiled. The middle three bays project forward under hipped gables, and in the other bays are hipped half-dormers.	II
33–39 Greendale Road; 53.35380°N 3.00015°W		1901	A terrace of seven houses by Ernest George and Yeates. They are in two storeys and seven bays, some of the bays are recessed and others project. The houses are built in roughcast on brick and have tiled roofs. Three of the outer bays are gabled, two have jettied upper floors, and the windows are small-paned casements, some of them in canted bay windows.	II
54–58 Greendale Road; 53.35192°N 2.99920°W		1901	A terrace of five houses by Pain and Blease in two storeys and five gabled bays. They are in brick with slated roofs and tile crests. The central and end bays project forward, and the central gable is diapered.	II
9–13 Lower Road; 53.35656°N 2.99962°W		1901	Three houses by Wilson and Talbot in two storeys and three bays. They are roughcast on a brick base and have a tiled roof. Each of the bays is gabled, and each contains a two-storey bow window.	II
11–17 Greendale Road; 53.35516°N 3.00080°W		1902	A terrace of seven houses by Wilson and Talbot in two storeys and ten bays. The houses are timber-framed on a stone base with a stone-slate roof. The outer bays project forward, giving a U-shaped plan. The upper storey and the gables are jettied.	II
64–70 Greendale Road; 53.35120°N 2.99887°W		1902	A terrace of seven houses by Wilson and Talbot in two storeys and nine bays. The roof is tiled, and the lower storey is in brick with stone dressings. The middle and outer bays are in brick and gabled, two bays have a pebbledashed upper floor with shaped parapets, and in two bays the upper floor is timber-framed.	II
9–17 Pool Bank; 53.35804°N 2.99668°W		c. 1902	A terrace of five houses by J. J. Taylor. They are in two storeys and five bays. The ground floor is in brick on a stone base, the upper floor is pebbledashed, and the roof is tiled. The second and fourth bays project forward, and the outer bays project even further; all are gabled. In the outer bays are canted bay windows, and the entrances have canopies on Tuscan columns. In the upper storey are Venetian windows, and the other windows are sashes.	II
99–109 Bebington Road; 53.35777°N 3.00118°W		1905	A terrace of six houses in two storeys and six bays. They are in brick with stone dressings and have a tiled roof. The outer bays project forward and are gabled. Between these, the upper floor windows are in gabled half-dormers. All the gables have finials.	II
36–44 Central Road; 53.35675°N 2.99813°W		1906	Five houses by H. Blomfield Bare in two storeys and five bays. They are pebbledashed, with brick dressings in the ground floor, and have a pantile roof. The outer bays project forward, have jettied upper floors and are gabled, as is the middle bay. In the ground floor are bay windows, and in the upper floor are oriels.	II
15–27 Lower Road; 53.35635°N 2.99919°W		1906	A terrace of seven houses forming a shallow crescent by C. H. Reilly in one storey with attics and 14 bay. The ground floor is roughcast. Along the front is a skeletal colonnade under a cat-slide tiled roof. In the roof are round-headed dormers flanked by scrolls. On the sides are canted bay windows under hipped roofs.	II
11–21 Primrose Hill, 1–13 Lancaster Close, 2–14 Central Road; 53.35775°N 2.99888°W		1906	A group of 26 flats by Bradshaw and Gass in two storeys curving round a corner. There are eight bays on each main street and two on the corner. They are built in red brick on a blue brick base, they have yellow terracotta dressings, and slate roofs. On each of the main sides are two gables containing Venetian windows, and on the corner is a jettied timber-framed gable.	II
23–35 Primrose Hill; 53.35724°N 2.99964°W		1906	A terrace of seven houses by Ormrod and Pomeroy in two storeys and seven bays. The lower storey is brick, the upper storey is pebbledashed, the gables are timbered, and the roof is tiled. In the ground floor are bay windows, and above are oriel windows and gabled half-dormers. The gables are asymmetrical.	II
5–13 Central Road; 53.35783°N 2.99824°W		1907	A terrace of five houses by W. Naseby Adams in two storeys and five bays. They are pebbledashed with a tiled roof. The central three bays project forward under two gables containing roundels, and the outer bays have gambrel roofs.	II
15–27 Central Road; 53.35752°N 2.99804°W		1907	Seven houses by Garnett, Wright and Barnish in one storey with attics and nine bays. The central three houses are recessed. The houses are mainly in brick with some pebbledashing to the upper floor. There are seven gables, two of the middle gables being shaped and the other weatherboarded. Other features include bay windows, dormers and half-dormers.	II
1–9 Primrose Hill, 1 and 3 Central Road; 53.35815°N 2.99841°W		1907	A terrace of seven houses by C. E. Deacon and Horsburgh, are pebbledashed on a brick base with tiled roofs. They are in two storeys, with fronts of seven bays on Primrose Hill, three on Central Road, and a canted bay between. The two outer bays on each side have jettied upper floors with gables, and the middle two bays share a gable; the bays between have canopies on Doric columns, and dormers in the roof.	II
16–24 Central Road; 53.35730°N 2.99850°W		1911	Five houses by F. J. Barnish in two stories and five bays, the outer bays projecting forward and gabled. They are roughcast on a brick base and have a tiled roof. Above the doorways are tiled canopies. The screen wall to the left is included in the listing.	II
26–34 Central Road; 53.35705°N 2.99832°W		1911	Five houses by F. J. Barnish in two stories and five bays, the outer bays projecting forward under hipped gables. They are roughcast on a brick base and have a tiled roof. Above the doorways are tiled canopies.	II
