= Dell Bridge =

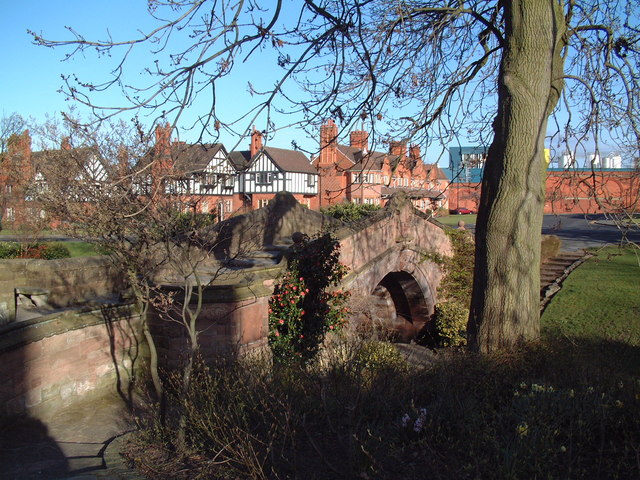
- Dell Bridge

- Location in Merseyside
- 53.350238°N 2.996237°W
- Location: Port Sunlight, Wirral, Merseyside, England

History
- Built: 1894
- Built for: Lever Brothers

Site notes
- Architect: Douglas and Fordham

Listed Building – Grade II
- Designated: 20 December 1965
- Reference no.: 1075486

Dell Bridge is a footbridge in Port Sunlight, Wirral, England. It is recorded in the National Heritage List for England as a designated Grade II listed building.

The bridge was built with sandstone in 1894 for Lever Brothers in their model village of Port Sunlight and was designed by the Chester architects' firm of Douglas and Fordham. It carries a pedestrian walkway over a landscaped hollow which had been formed from a former tidal inlet. It is a saddle-back bridge with a parabolic arch. The keystones are carved with masks, one of a Jacobean man, the other of a Restoration man. Above these are plaques, that to the east, bears an inscription; that to the west a sundial. The bridge is supported by buttresses, and at each end is a canted projection with decorative panels. There are hard wood benches by the walkway. Originally there were ball finials on the bridge, but these are no longer present.

== See also ==
- Listed buildings in Port Sunlight
- List of non-ecclesiastical and non-residential works by John Douglas
