= Leverhulme Memorial =

Memorial in Port Sunlight, Merseyside, England

Coordinates: 53°21′20.5″N 2°59′59.9″W

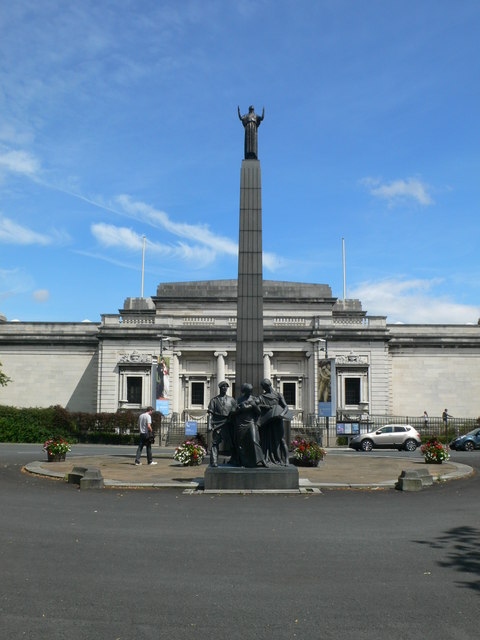
Leverhulme Memorial with the Lady Lever Art Gallery behind

The Leverhulme Memorial stands to the west of the Lady Lever Art Gallery on the junction of Windy Bank and Queen Mary's Drive, Port Sunlight, Wirral, Merseyside, England. It commemorates the life of William Lever, 1st Viscount Leverhulme, the businessman who created the factory and model village of Port Sunlight. The memorial was designed by James Lomax-Simpson, and the sculptor was William Reid Dick. It consists of an obelisk with a figure on the top, with a separate group of four figures beside it. The memorial was unveiled in 1930. It is recorded in the National Heritage List for England as a designated Grade II listed building.

== History ==
William Lever (1851–1925) was an English industrialist, art collector, politician, and benefactor. His major business was soap making for which he built a factory and a model village for his workers at Port Sunlight. By 1906 his company, Lever Brothers, was the largest soap manufacturer in Britain, and by 1922 it was one of the largest international companies in the world. Lever was a benevolent employer, caring for the welfare of his workers, and providing a high standard of housing for them. Between 1906 and 1909 he was a Liberal Member of Parliament for Wirral, and from 1917 a member of the House of Lords. He was also an art collector, and built the Lady Lever Art Gallery in the village to house his collection.

Following Lever's death, a committee was founded to arrange for a memorial. The committee approached all the workers of Lever Brothers, which was by then a world-wide organisation, and received 22,000 individual contributions. James Lomax-Simpson was the company's architect and he was responsible for the architectural elements of the memorial. Lomax-Simpson appointed William Reid Dick to be the sculptor. Reid Dick began work in 1927, and the memorial was completed three years later. It was built by John Stubbs and Son. The memorial was unveiled on 13 September 1930 by Thomas Peacock, a veteran employee of the company, who had retired the previous year after 43 years' service. Speeches were made by the company's chairman and by Lever's son. The upper figure on the monument was restored in about 1995, and the four lower figures in 2002.

== Description ==
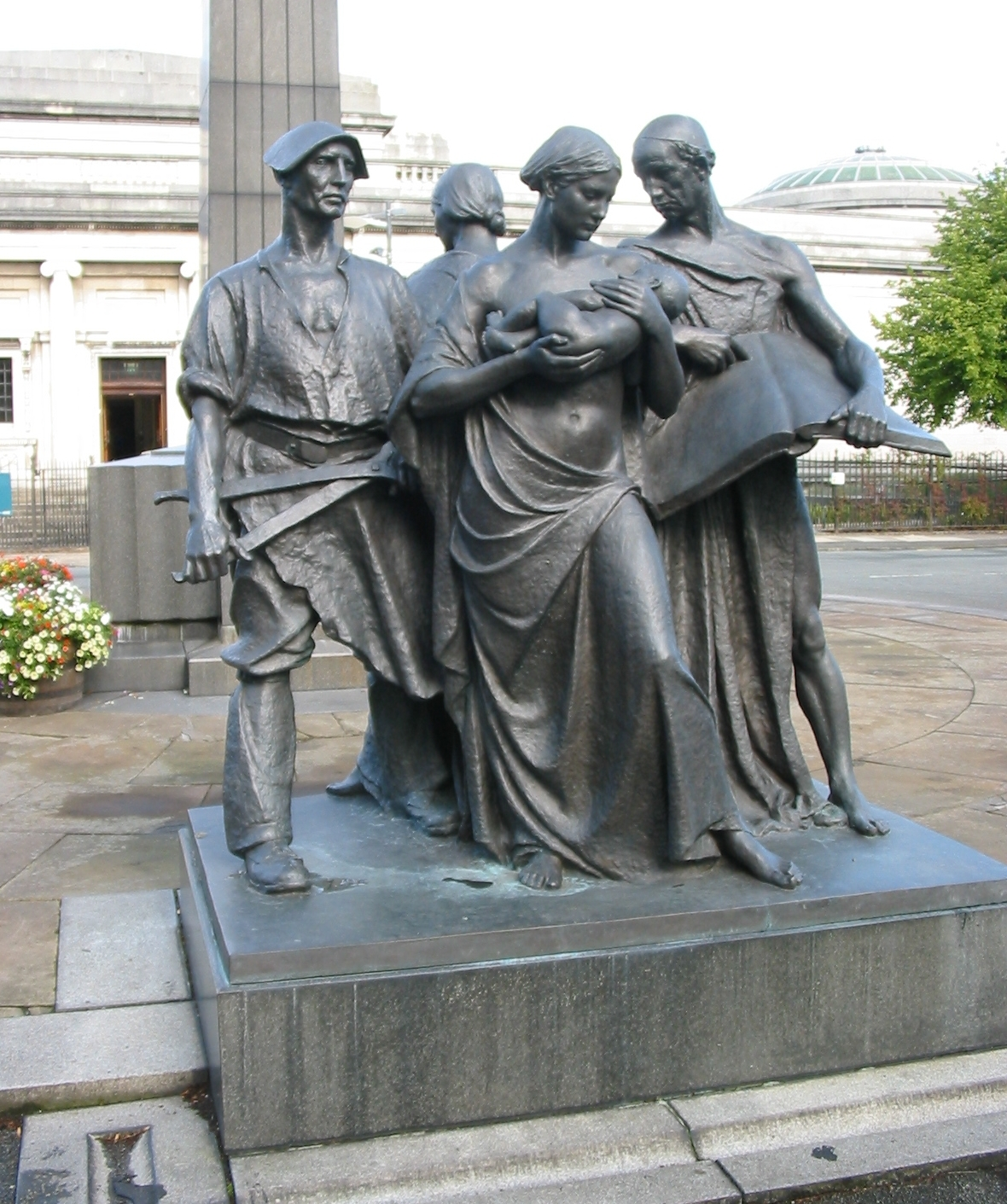
Figures at the base of the monument

The monument consists of an obelisk with a figure standing on its top, and a free-standing group of four figures to the west of the obelisk, the whole on a circular island surrounded by roads. The figures are in bronze, and the obelisk is in polished granite. The obelisk and its figure are about 18 metres (59 ft) high, the four figures at the base are about 2.1 metres (7 ft) in height, and the plinth on which they stand is about 40 centimetres (1.3 ft) high. The obelisk has a square base, is fluted, and tapers towards the top. The figure on top is that of a female facing away from the art gallery, looking at the sky, with her arms raised. It is Expressionist in style, and represents Inspiration. The four figures at the base are more realistic. Three figures face away from the art gallery, on the left is Industry, represented by a man holding a tool, in the middle is Charity, a woman cradling a child, and on the right is Education, a male scholar holding a book and pointing at a page. On the back, facing the gallery, is Art, a woman with a palette. The figures are intended to represent Lever's qualities and interests.

On the front of the obelisk is an inscription reading as follows:

LEVERHULME
1851-1925
TO THE HONOURED MEMORY OF
WILLIAM HESKETH
FIRST VISCOUNT
LEVERHULME
FOUNDER OF LEVER BROTHERS LIMITED
AND OF PORT SUNLIGHT.
A MAN REMARKABLE FOR HIS
BUSINESS ABILITY. HIS PUBLIC
BENEFACTIONS AND HIS LOVE OF
BEAUTY AND ART. THIS MONUMENT
IS ERECTED BY HIS FELLOW WORKERS

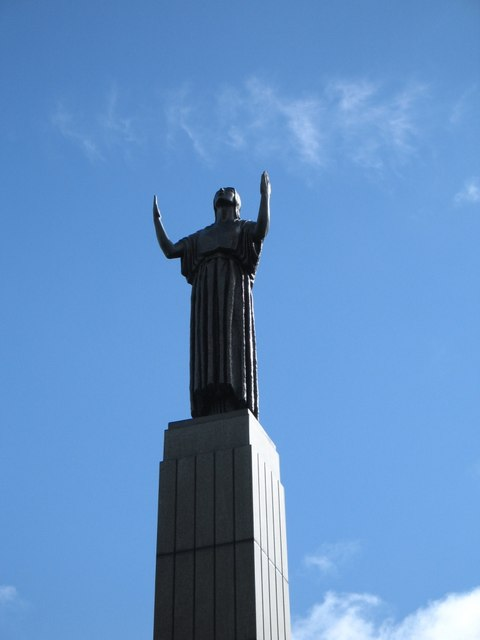
Figure on top of the memorial

On the back is the inscription:

THE FIGURES AT THE BASE OF THE MEMORIAL SYMBOLISE THE THREE
GREAT INTERESTS IN THE LIFE OF THE FOUNDER OF PORT SUNLIGHT
INDUSTRY, EDUCATION
AND CHARITY IN ITS WIDEST MEANING
THE FIGURE AT THE TOP OF THE COLUMN REPRESENTS 'INSPIRATION'
THE FOUNDATION OF ALL HUMAN PROGRESS

== Appraisal ==
The memorial was designated as a Grade II listed building on 20 December 1965. Grade II is the lowest of the three grades of listing and is applied to "buildings of national importance and special interest". Nikolaus Pevsner was not enthusiastic about it, saying that it was "an interesting design, but surely superfluous", and he added the Latin phrase Si monumentum requiris, circumspice, which translates as "if you seek his monument, look around you".

== See also ==
- Listed buildings in Port Sunlight
