= Arthur Charles Evans =

English WWII veteran and author

Arthur Charles Evans CBE (21 March 1916 – 18 March 2011) was best known as the author of Sojourn in Silesia: 1940 – 1945, in which he recounts his experiences of his time in World War II, between 1940 and 1945, in the prisoner-of-war camp, Stalag VIIIB.

Thousands of young men were incarcerated in Stalag VIIIB, in Lamsdorf, by the Germans during World War II. Evans recounted these experiences both in his book, as well as on his website, Lamsdorf Remembered. The website was created due to public response from the children and grandchildren of former inmates of Stalag VIIIB, the website originally named Lamsdorf Reunited was created to record stories and photographs from that experience. Evans encountered the respected RAF pilot Douglas Bader while at Stalag VIIIB, and talked about his escape attempts in his book. Evans himself is mentioned in a book called POW: Allied Prisoners in Europe, 1939–1945 by Adrian Gilbert who used Sojourn in Silesia for his information. Evans was a member of The National Ex-Prisoner of War Association, whose patron is Dame Vera Lynn, DBE, LLD, M.MUS, and is mentioned in the August 2001 newsletter.

More recently, on his website Lamsdorf Remembered, a half-hour Radio Kent interview with Evans was published, as well as a blog called Letters from Stalag VIIIB, which is made up of Evans' letters home during his four years as a prisoner-of-war. The blog was published as a book in February 2014 by Evans' daughter Kathryn Gower.

== Life ==
Arthur Charles Evans was born in 1916 in the Wirral, Cheshire. The first years of his employment were at Lever Brothers, soapworks at Port Sunlight, and then with the New Zealand Shipping Company. One voyage to Australia and then another to New Zealand convinced him he was not meant to be a sailor. To further his ambition to become a policeman, he enlisted in the Irish Guards in 1936. In May 1940, he was wounded and taken prisoner in Bolougne and spent the remainder of the war in prison camps in Upper Silesia. He returned to England in May 1945 and upon demobilisation, joined the Kent County Constabulary.

Evans was a friend of James Callaghan and his wife Audrey Callaghan, Baroness Callaghan of Cardiff, whom he had met when Callaghan was Parliamentary Adviser to the Police Federation from 1955 to 1960. They worked together during that time on negotiations for an increase in police pay. Whilst still a police constable Arthur was Secretary of the Police Federation from 1956 to 1967 and it was in this capacity that he was appointed Commander of the Order of the British Empire (CBE) on 1 January 1967. In an article dated 19 August 1966, Police Federation Secretary Arthur Evans complained that, because of the old anti-gun tradition, "you could count on the fingers of one hand police trained in the use of firearms."

Evans was also responsible for policemen finally being allowed to buy their own homes. Up until then, they were at the mercy of the Chief Constables and being moved around the country.

In May 1967, Evans organised and headed up the British contingent at The World Congress of Police Officers in Niagara Falls, Canada. He later returned to police work in Sevenoaks, Dover, Whitstable and Herne Bay, his last position being as an Inspector in 1970. He later became the chief of administration at Ashford Police Station (Ashford, Kent), a position he held until 1981.

He was married to his wife Freda for 62 years, and they had three daughters, Gillian, Kathryn and Vivienne, five grandchildren and three great-grandchildren. He retired aged 65, and spent much of his time gardening, bowling and cooking in his Kent home, and in later years caring for Freda. Freda who had Alzheimer's for many years, died peacefully on 2 June 2016.

Evans died of natural causes on 18 March 2011. He left a request for some of the profit from Sojourn in Silesia to go to the British Red Cross.
