= William Owen (architect, born 1846) =

English architect

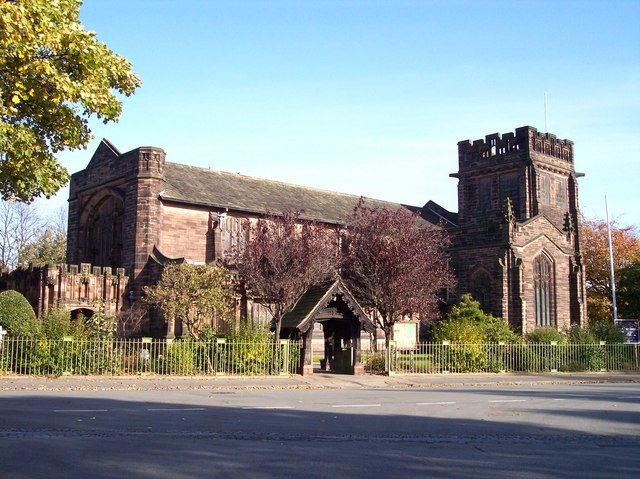
Christ Church, Port Sunlight (1902–04)

William Owen (27 August 1846 – 5 April 1910) was an English architect who practised in Warrington, which was at that time in Lancashire, England. His works were confined to Northwest England. Owen is best known for his collaboration with William Lever in the creation of the soap-making factory and associated model village at Port Sunlight in the Wirral Peninsula (then in Cheshire, now in Merseyside). Here he designed the factory, many of the workers' houses, public buildings and the church. Later Owen was joined by his son, Segar, as a partner. On his own, or in partnership, Owen designed houses, churches, banks, public houses, an infirmary, a school, and a concert hall.

== Biography and career ==
William Owen was born in Latchford, Warrington. He trained as an architect under John Lowe in Manchester, becoming his assistant, and later was assistant to James Radford. He then travelled in Europe before establishing a practice in Warrington in 1869. He was joined in partnership by his eldest son, Segar, in 1898. The partnership also had an office in Manchester. Owen's work was confined to Northwest England. His more notable designs include churches in Altrincham, Greater Manchester, and Warrington, buildings for Parr's Bank in Southport, Merseyside, and Wigan, Greater Manchester, and the Parr Hall, a concert hall in Warrington. The partnership were architects to the Greenall Whitley Brewery Company, and built public houses for them in Warrington, and Stockton Heath, Cheshire.

== Port Sunlight ==
In 1886 William Lever established a soap factory in Warrington. The site proved to be too small for his plans and the rent was too high. Lever and Owen together travelled around the area looking for a larger and more suitable site. They settled on a marshy area near Bromborough Pool in the Wirral Peninsula. Here they planned to build a larger factory and the model village that was to become Port Sunlight. Building the factory began in 1888, followed by the first houses in the next year, the first 28 of which were designed by Owen. Owen then went on to design more houses and other buildings in the village, initially on his own, and later with Segar. In the village, on his own or with his son, Owen also designed public buildings. These include Gladstone Hall (1891), originally a men's dining and recreation room and later the Gladstone Theatre, Hulme Hall (1901), a women's dining hall, and Christ Church (1902–04), a Congregational church.

The firm also designed Newcastle on Tyne offices for Lever Brothers in a Neo-Baroque style, named Sunlight Chambers and constructed in 1901-2.

== Works elsewhere ==
=== Single-handed ===
- Baptist Church, Altrincham, Greater Manchester (1878–79)
- St Barnabas' Church, Bank Quay, Warrington, Cheshire (1879)
- School of Art, Warrington, Cheshire (1883)
- Extensions to All Saints Church, Thelwall, Cheshire (1890)
- National Westminster Bank, Southport, Merseyside (1892) (originally Parr's Bank)
- Ticketford, Thornton Hough, Merseyside (1892)
- 5–11 The Folds, Thornton Hough, Merseyside (1892)
- Eversley, Frodsham, Cheshire (c. 1892)
- 1–6 Manor Road, Thornton Hough, Merseyside (1893)
- Parr Hall, Warrington (1895)
- Albion public house, Warrington, Cheshire (1896)
- St Clement's Chapel, Warrington, Cheshire (1897) (demolished)
- National Westminster Bank, Wigan, Greater Manchester (1898) (originally Parr's Bank)
- Normanshurst Hotel, Manchester (1898)
- Cemetery Chapel, Hale Barns, Greater Manchester (date unknown)
- Windsor Court (originally a Post Office), Knutsford, Cheshire (date unknown)
- Sunlight Chambers, Newcastle-on-Tyne (1901-2)

=== In partnership ===
- Workhouse Infirmary, Warrington, Cheshire (now Kendrick Wing, Warrington General Hospital) (1899)
- Royal Oak public house, Warrington, Cheshire (c. 1900)
- Wheatsheaf public house, Warrington, Cheshire (c. 1900)
- Technical School, Warrington (1900–01)
- Mulberry Tree public house, Stockton Heath, Cheshire (1907)
- Organ screen, St Elphin's Church, Warrington, Cheshire (1908)
