= Lyceum, Port Sunlight =

Lyceum
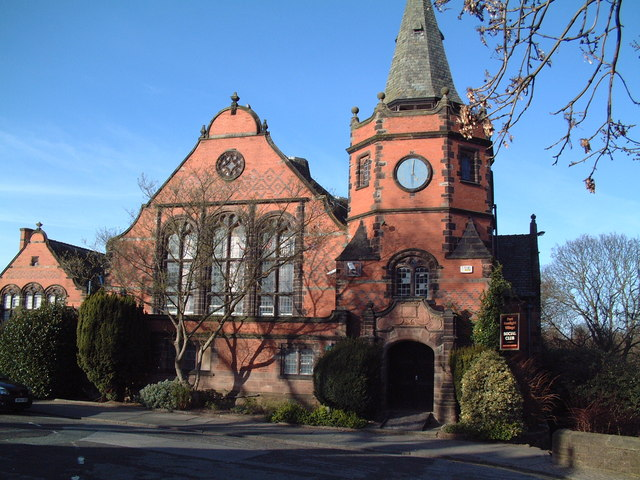
- Lyceum, Port Sunlight

- Location in Merseyside
- 53.3505°N 2.9963°W
- Location: Bridge Street, Port Sunlight, Merseyside, England
- OS grid reference: SJ 338 842

History
- Built: 1894–96
- Built for: William Lever

Site notes
- Architect: Douglas & Fordham

Listed Building – Grade II
- Designated: 20 December 1965
- Reference no.: 1075485

The Lyceum is a building on Bridge Street, Port Sunlight, Merseyside, England. Originally built as a school, it is now used for a variety of purposes, including housing a social club. It is recorded in the National Heritage List for England as a designated Grade II listed building.

== History ==
The Lyceum was built for William Lever in 1894–96, and was designed by the Chester firm of architects Douglas and Fordham. It was originally built as the school for the developing community of Port Sunlight and was used as a place of worship until the church was built. It later acquired the name of the Lyceum. As of 2009 it is being used partly as a social centre and partly as architects' offices. There are plans to develop another part of it as a Victorian classroom to form part of Port Sunlight Museum.

== Architecture ==
The main front of the building faces southeast. It has five bays in an irregular plan, and is mainly in one storey. The walls are constructed in red Ruabon brick with blue brick diapering and stone dressings. The roofs are of slate with tiled ridges. From the left, the first bay projects forwards. It has a three-light window, an elliptical-arched doorway and a plain gable. The second bay is recessed and higher, with three two-light windows and a shaped gable. The third bay is recessed even further, is in two storeys and has a doorway and a shaped gable. The fourth bay is the most substantial, wider and higher than the others, and projecting forwards. It contains three pairs of two-light windows and has a shaped gable in which there is a circular window with star-shaped tracery. There are finials on all the gables. On the right of the main front is a turret which has a square base and is octagonal above with broaches at the transition. On the ground floor is an elliptical-headed doorway with a two-light window over it. Above this is a string course, then a clock and a window on alternative faces. Over these is another string course and a parapet with ball finials. The turret is surmounted by a recessed slate spire with a weather vane.

== See also ==
- Listed buildings in Port Sunlight
- List of non-ecclesiastical and non-residential works by John Douglas
