= Sunlight Chambers, Dublin =

Italianate style office building in Dublin, Ireland

Sunlight Chambers
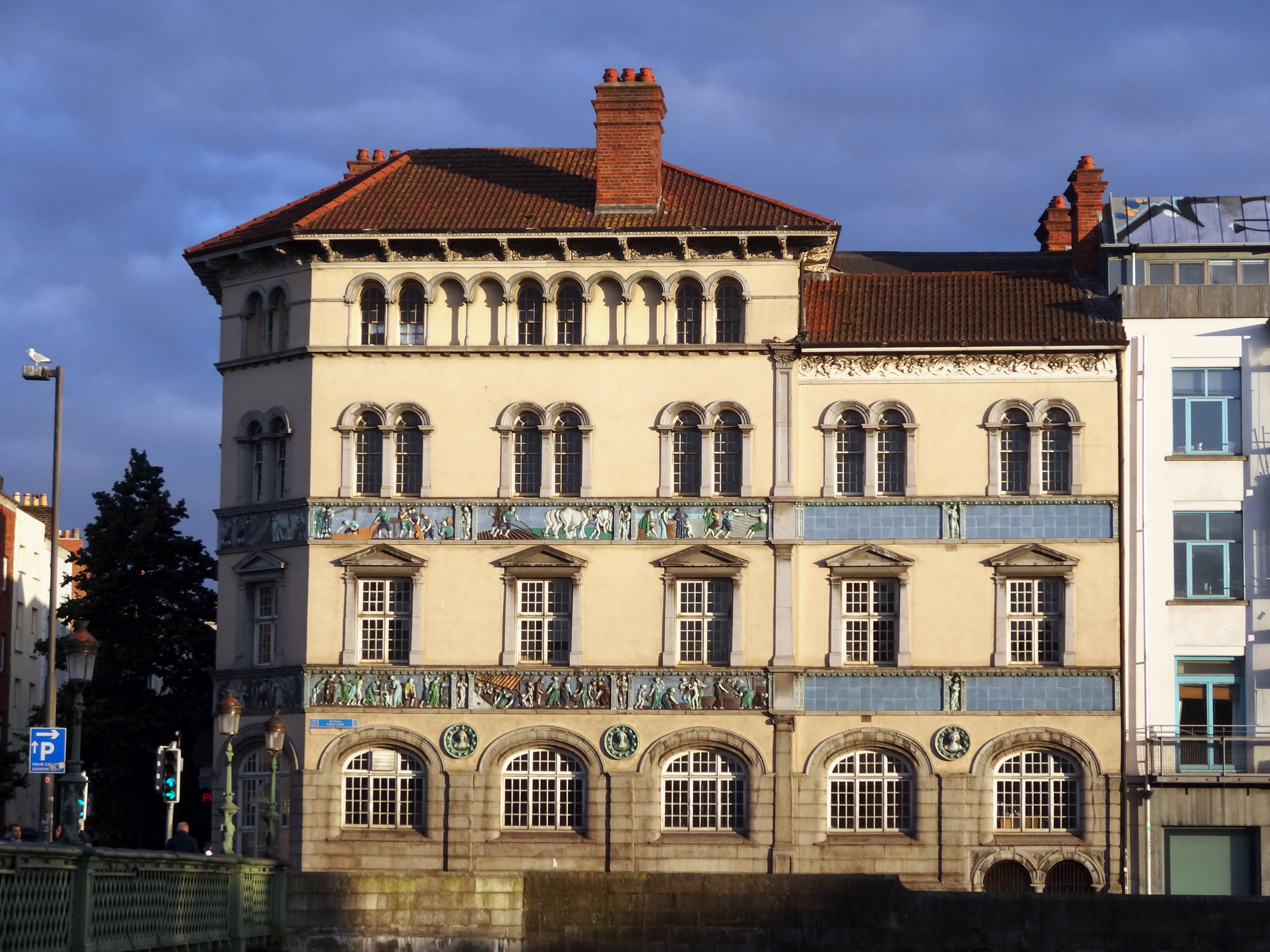
- Sunlight Chambers in 2017

- Location within Central Dublin

General information
- Type: Various
- Architectural style: Italianate
- Location: Parliament Street, Essex Quay, 20/21 Parliament Street, Dublin 2, D02 TW99
- Coordinates: 53.34474°N 6.26742°W
- Construction started: 1900
- Completed: 1910
- Client: Lever Brothers

Design and construction
- Architect: Edward Ould

Sunlight Chambers is a commercial office building on the corner of Parliament Street and Essex Quay in the Temple Bar area of Dublin. It was designed by architect Edward Ould in an Italianate style and was named after Lever Brothers' Sunlight detergent brand.

== History ==
Lever Brothers was founded in 1895 by brothers William Hesketh Lever, 1st Viscount Leverhulme (1851–1925), and James Darcy Lever (1854–1916). Together with chemist William Hough, the brothers created a soap that used glycerin and vegetable oils such as palm oil instead of tallow. The resulting soap was free-lathering. At first, it was named Honey Soap but later became "Sunlight Soap".

In 1899, the brothers leased land opposite Grattan Bridge on the banks of the River Liffey to set up a Dublin branch of their company. They hired Liverpool architect Ould, who had previously designed various buildings for the company's Port Sunlight model village near Liverpool. The Dublin building was designed and constructed between 1900 and 1910 and named after their then-famous soap brand.

In the late 1990s Gilroy McMahon architects restored the building and repainted the exterior in a 'light umber' colour.

== Design ==
Ould designed the building in the Italianate style. This was unusual for the area, which was dominated by genteel Georgian and Victorian architecture that tended to be externally restrained and internally decorative. According to Ireland's National Inventory of Architectural Heritage, the building is marked by distinctive faience panels that depict the history of soap production. While Essex Quay was laid out in the 1720s, Sunlight Chambers is the oldest remaining structure in the riverside area.

The sculptor Conrad Dressler was engaged to design much of the external frieze work on the building.

== Sister building in Newcastle upon Tyne ==
At almost the same time, Lever Brothers built a branch in Newcastle upon Tyne, which they also called Sunlight Chambers. Although the Newcastle branch was designed in a modified Baroque style rather than an Italianate style, both Sunlight Chambers feature characteristic circumferential friezes.
