= Sunlight Chambers, Newcastle =

Sunlight Chambers
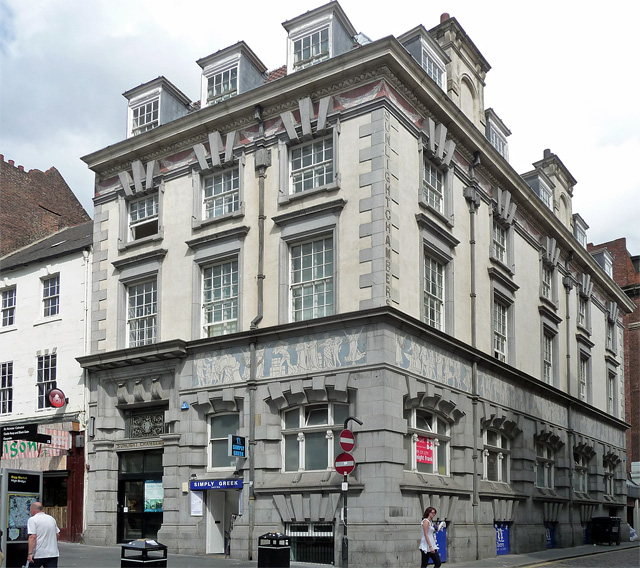

- Location within Tyne and Wear
- 54.9713°N 1.6134°W
- Location: Newcastle upon Tyne

History
- Built: 1901-2

Site notes
- Architectural style: Baroque

Listed Building – Grade II
- Designated: 30 March 1987
- Reference no.: 1116510

Sunlight Chambers is a listed residential and commercial building on Bigg Market in Newcastle upon Tyne. It was designed by architects William & Segar Owen in a modified Baroque style and was named after Lever Brothers' Sunlight detergent brand.

== History ==
Lever Brothers was founded in 1895 by brothers William Hesketh Lever, 1st Viscount Leverhulme (1851–1925), and James Darcy Lever (1854–1916). Together with chemist William Hough, the brothers created a soap that used glycerin and vegetable oils such as palm oil instead of tallow. The resulting soap was free-lathering. At first, it was named Honey Soap but later became "Sunlight Soap".

In 1901, the brothers hired architects William & Segar Owen to design a building for the Newcastle branch of their company. It was constructed between 1901 and 1902 and was named after Lever Brothers' then-famous soap brand.

== Design ==
The building is constructed in a modified Baroque style using sandstone ashlar. The building features a frieze depicting harvest and industry. Its roof consists of French tiles and its architrave-featuring windows are dormer at roof level.

== Sister building in Dublin ==
At almost the same time, Lever Brothers built a branch in Dublin, which they also called Sunlight Chambers. Although the Irish building was designed in an Italianate style rather than a Baroque style, both Sunlight Chambers feature a characteristic circumferential frieze.

== See also ==
- Port Sunlight, Lever Brothers' model village in Merseyside, begun in 1888.
- Sunlight House, Manchester
