= Grayson and Ould =

British architectural practice

Grayson and Ould was the title of an architectural practice in Liverpool, Merseyside, England, during the late 19th and early 20th century. The partners were George Enoch Grayson (1833/4–1912) (usually known as G. E. Grayson) and Edward Ould (1852–1909). Grayson's son, George Hastwell Grayson (1871–1951), joined the partnership in 1896. G. E. Grayson had been articled to Jonathan Gilliband Sale, and then studied on the Continent. In 1857 he established an independent architectural practice in Liverpool. Ould had trained with John Douglas in Chester. The two architects formed a partnership in 1886; prior to this each designed notable buildings separately. After 1886 most of the notable works were designed together. Grayson's son, George Hastwell Grayson (1871–1951), joined the partnership in 1896.

== See also ==
- List of works by Grayson and Ould
