= Christ Church, Port Sunlight =

Coordinates: 53.3535°N 2.9954°W

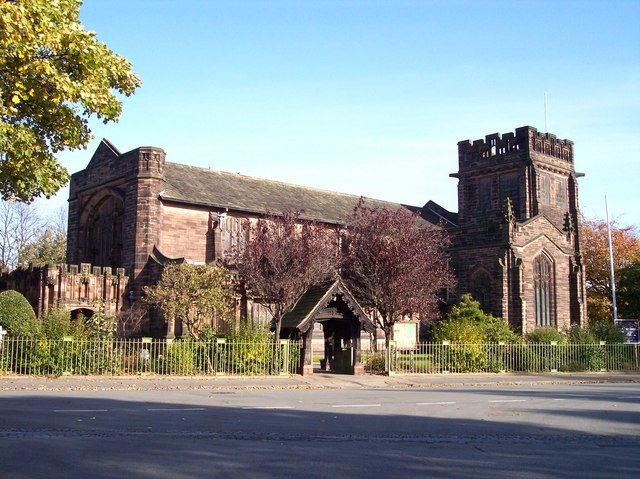
- Christ Church, Port Sunlight, from the southwest

- Location in Merseyside
- Location: Church Drive, Port Sunlight, Wirral, Merseyside
- Country: England
- Denomination: United Reformed Church
- Website: www.ccpsurc.info

History
- Founder: William Lever

Architecture
- Functional status: Active
- Heritage designation: Grade II*
- Designated: 20 December 1965
- Architect(s): William and Segar Owen
- Architectural type: Church
- Style: Gothic Revival
- Groundbreaking: 1902
- Completed: 1904

Specifications
- Materials: Sandstone, stone-slate roof Revd Ian Smith

Christ Church is in Church Drive, Port Sunlight, Wirral, Merseyside, England. It is an active United Reformed Church, and is recorded in the National Heritage List for England as a designated Grade II* listed building.

== History ==
Port Sunlight is a model village that was built for the workers at the soap factory of Lever Brothers, founded by William Lever. Christ Church was built between 1902 and 1904, and was designed by William and Segar Owen. The church was paid for by William Lever. It was opened on 8 June 1904. It was originally built as a non-denominational church with a Wesleyan minister at the time it was erected, but later became a Congregational church (William Lever himself was a Congregationalist.) it is now part of the United Reformed Church. In 1914 the Lever family vault was added as a memorial to the memory of Lady Lever. As a Millennium project in 2000, two new rooms were built into the aisles for the use of children and the youth of the church.

== Architecture ==
=== Exterior ===
The church is constructed in red sandstone from Helsby in Cheshire, and has a stone-slate roof. It is in Gothic Revival style. The plan consists of a six-bay nave with a clerestory, north and south aisles with lean-to roofs, a southwest porch, a double north transept, a south transept, a canted chancel, a southeast tower and, at the west end, the Lady Lever Memorial. The windows along the sides of the aisles and clerestory have three lights containing Perpendicular-style tracery. At the corners of the west end are canted projections topped by parapets. The west window has a four-centred head and contains nine lights. The transepts have gabled buttresses surmounted by pinnacles; there is an entrance in the south transept. There are also buttresses on the tower, which has two-light louvred bell openings, a cornice, and a traceried, embattled parapet. The Lady Lever Memorial is in the form of a loggia at the west end of the church. It is in three bays, and is richly decorated, with buttresses, pinnacles, niches, and an embattled parapet.

=== Interior ===
The church can seat 800 people. The arcades are simple, carried on piers without capitals. The furnishings were made by Hatch and Sons, the wood carving being by C. J. Allen, and the stone carving by J. J. Millson. The floor of the church is in black and white Italian marble, the pews, screens and reredos are in English oak, and the roof timbers in Canadian pitch pine. Most of the stained glass is by Heaton, Butler and Bayne. This includes the windows at the east end, which total 16 lights, the west window, and the windows in the south transept. There are also two aisle windows of 1950 by Ervin Bossányi. The four-manual pipe organ was built in 1904 by Henry Willis II of Henry Willis & Sons, and was restored in 2006–07 by the same company. According to the church website it is believed to be the largest extant four-manual Willis II organ still in its original condition and in everyday use. There is a ring of eight bells, all of which were cast in 1904 by Mears and Stainbank. In the Lady Lever Memorial is the chest tomb of Lady Lever, who died in 1913, and of William Lever, who died in 1925. On this are recumbent bronze effigies by Sir W. Goscombe John.

=== Chapel yard ===
In addition to Lever family vault, the churchyard contains the war graves of six British Army soldiers of World War I and two soldiers and an airman of World War II.

== See also ==
- Grade II* listed buildings in Merseyside
- Listed buildings in Port Sunlight
