= Hulme Hall, Port Sunlight =

Event venue in Port Sunlight, Wirral, England, formerly also a music venue

Coordinates: 53.35168°N 2.996604°W

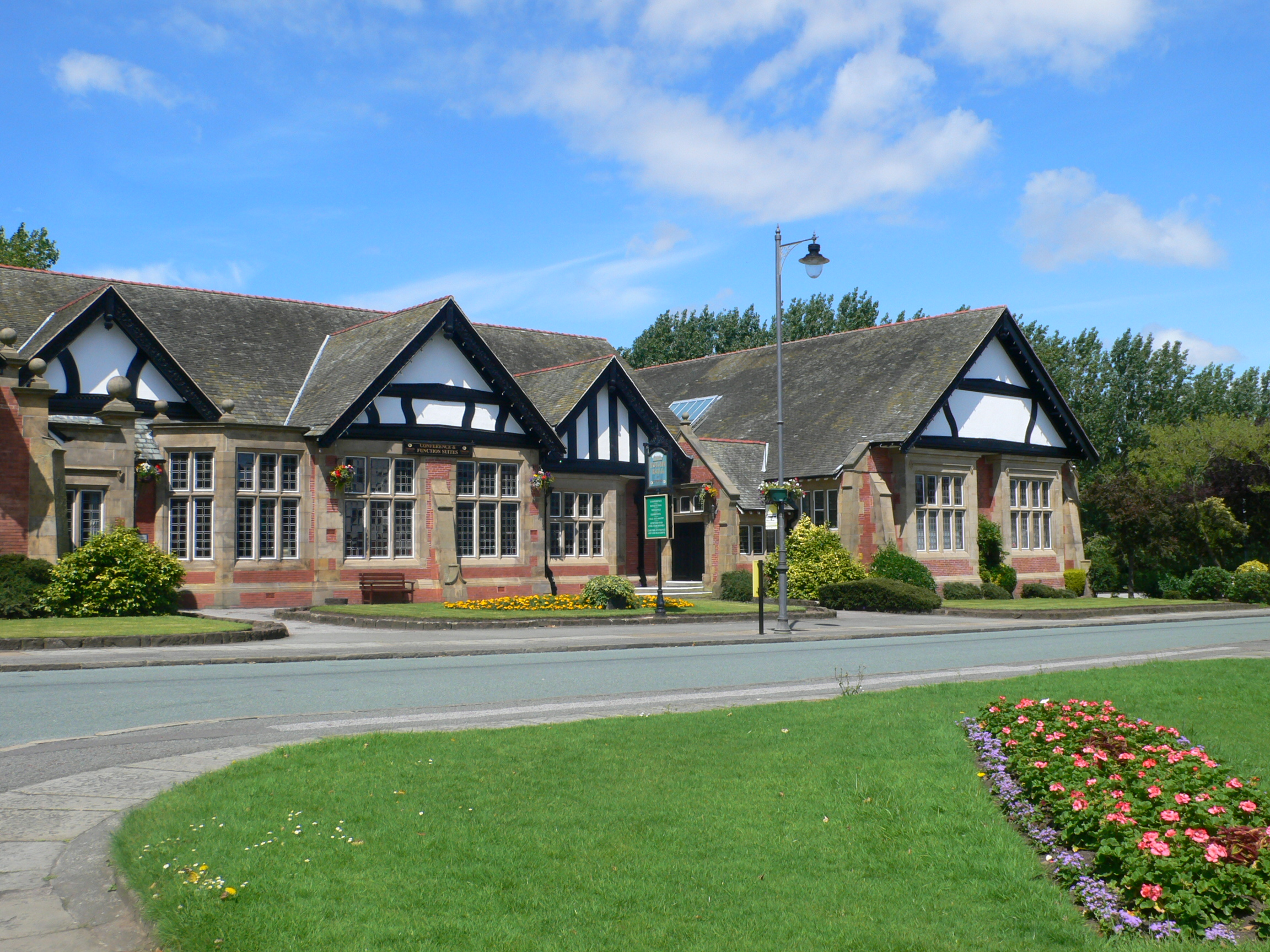
Hulme Hall in 2012

Hulme Hall in Port Sunlight, on the Wirral Peninsula in Merseyside, England, is a Grade II listed building, first registered as such in 1965.

== History ==
The building was designed by William Owen and his son, Segar. Built in 1901 as a women's dining hall, it became an art gallery from 1911, housing some of the collection of William Lever, 1st Viscount Leverhulme, prior to its removal to the Lady Lever Art Gallery around 1922. During World War I, the artworks were packed away and the building housed refugees from Belgium.

The Beatles gave four performances at Hulme Hall, the first on 7 July 1962. On 18 August 1962, Hulme Hall served as the venue for Ringo Starr's first official performance as a Beatle following the sacking of Pete Best; the band's first performance as the Fab Four. Other shows followed on 6 and 27 October 1962.

== Recent use ==
It has been used as a community centre and, as of 2015, it is used as a conference, banqueting and wedding centre.

== See also ==
- Listed buildings in Merseyside
