= Port Sunlight =

Model village in the Metropolitan Borough of Wirral, Merseyside, England

Coordinates: 53.353°N 2.998°W

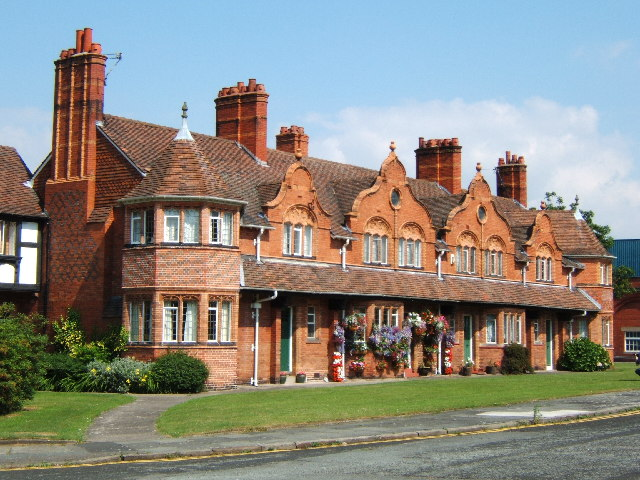
- An example of Port Sunlight village architecture

- Location within Merseyside
- Population: 2,065
- OS grid reference: SJ338847
  - London: 176 mi (283 km) SE
- Metropolitan borough: Wirral
- Metropolitan county: Merseyside
- Region: North West
- Country: England
- Sovereign state: United Kingdom
- Post town: WIRRAL
- Postcode district: CH62
- Dialling code: 0151
- ISO 3166 code: GB-WRL
- Police: Merseyside
- Fire: Merseyside
- Ambulance: North West
- UK Parliament: Ellesmere Port and Bromborough

Port Sunlight is a model village in the Metropolitan Borough of Wirral, Merseyside, England. It is located between Lower Bebington and New Ferry, on the Wirral Peninsula. Port Sunlight was built by Lever Brothers to accommodate workers in its soap factory (now part of Unilever); work commenced in 1888. The name is derived from Lever Brothers' most popular brand of cleaning agent, Sunlight.

All Port Sunlight's original buildings are listed at Grade II, and it was declared a conservation area in 1978. Port Sunlight has been informally suggested for World Heritage Site (WHS) status to protect it from development and to preserve the unique character for future generations; however, it is not yet on the current UK "tentative list" for future consideration as a WHS. In the 2001 Census, its population was 1,450.

== History ==
In 1887, Lever Brothers began looking for a new site on which to expand its soap-making business, which was at that time based in Warrington. The company bought 56 acres (23 ha) of flat unused marshy land in Cheshire, south of the River Mersey. It was large enough to allow space for expansion, and had a prime location between the river and a railway line. The site became Port Sunlight, where William Lever built his works and a model village to house his employees. William Lever (who was created a baronet in December 1911, and was raised to the Peerage of the United Kingdom as the 1st Baron Leverhulme in June 1917, and was further advanced to being the 1st Viscount Leverhulme in December 1922) personally supervised planning the village, and employed nearly thirty different architects. Between 1889 and 1914, 800 houses were built to house a population of 3,500. The garden village had allotments and public buildings including the Lady Lever Art Gallery, a cottage hospital, schools, a concert hall, an open air swimming pool, a church, and a temperance hotel. Lever introduced welfare schemes, and provided for the education and entertainment of his workforce, encouraging recreation and organisations which promoted art, literature, science or music.

The aims of Lord Leverhulme, as he became, were "to socialise and Christianise business relations and get back to that close family brotherhood that existed in the good old days of hand labour." He claimed that Port Sunlight was an exercise in profit sharing, but rather than share profits directly, he invested them in the village. He said, "It would not do you much good if you send it down your throats in the form of bottles of whisky, bags of sweets, or fat geese at Christmas. On the other hand, if you leave the money with me, I shall use it to provide for you everything that makes life pleasant – nice houses, comfortable homes, and healthy recreation."

The historical significance of Port Sunlight lies in its combination of model industrial housing, providing materially decent conditions for working people, with the architectural and landscape values of the garden suburb, influenced by the ideas of William Morris and the Arts and Crafts Movement. Each block of houses was designed by a different architect. The backs of any of the houses cannot be seen, and each house is unique. In terms of architectural features, there is half-timbering, carved woodwork and masonry, pargetting (ornamental plaster work) moulded and twisted chimneys and leaded glazed patterns. Some houses were built in Flemish style, with bricks imported from Belgium.

== Geography ==
Port Sunlight is on the eastern side of the Wirral Peninsula, at the western side of the River Mersey. The area is approximately 10.5 km (6.5 mi) south-south-east of the Irish Sea at New Brighton and about 8 km (5 mi) east-north-east of the Dee Estuary at Gayton. The area is between 10 and 23 m (33 and 75 ft) above sea level.

== Community ==
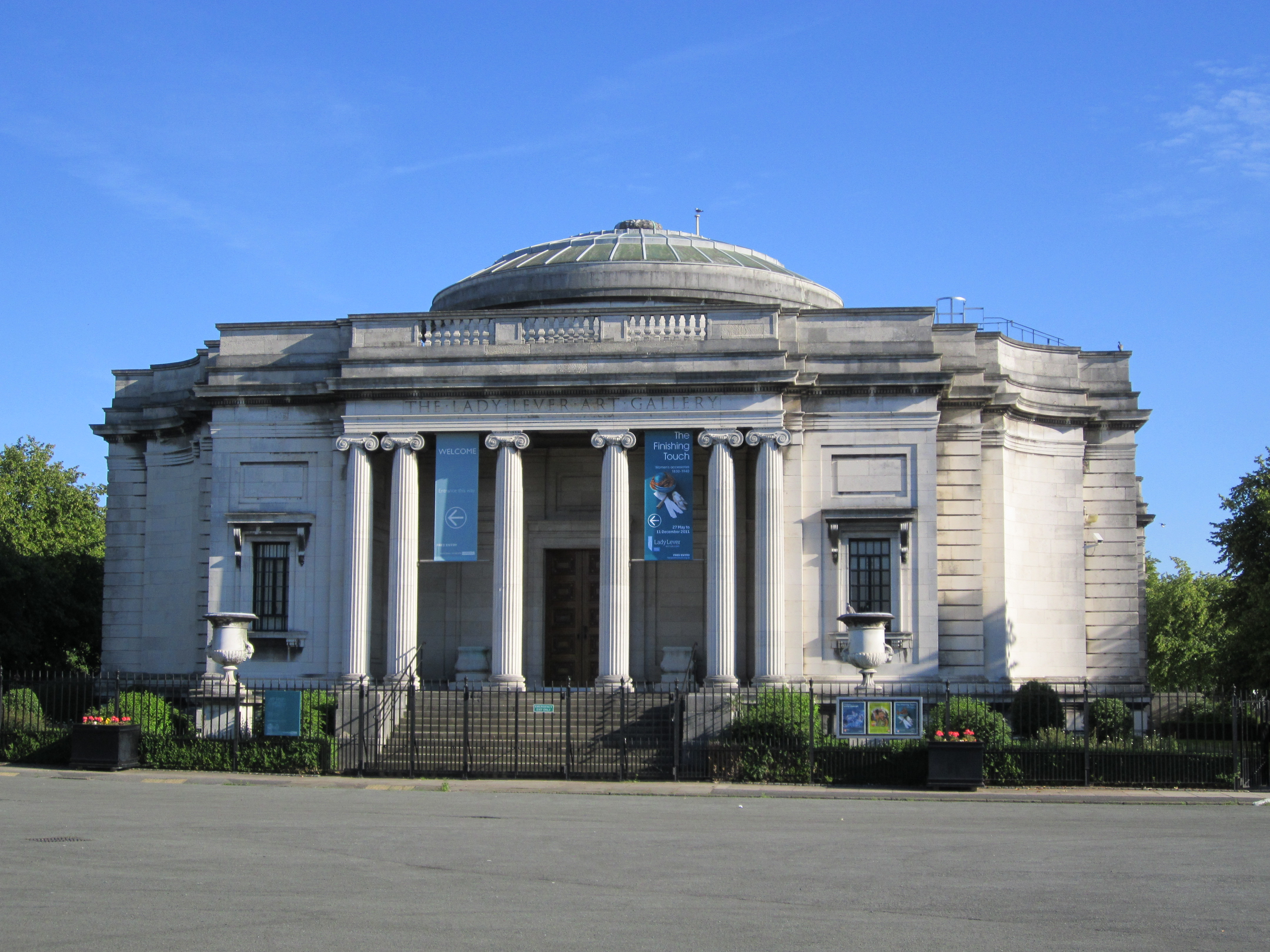
Lady Lever Art Gallery

One of the great buildings in Port Sunlight is the Lady Lever Art Gallery. A keen art collector, Lever travelled all over the world and liked to show the villagers the art he collected. Opened in 1922 by Princess Beatrice, the art gallery shows Lever's collection and modern-day artwork. The collection includes a range of furniture, paintings, sculptures and ceramics.

Other notable buildings include the Lyceum, the Gladstone Theatre (which hosts local amateur dramatic productions), Hesketh Hall (which housed the local branch of the Royal British Legion until 2013, when it was converted into 13 flats) and the "Bridge Inn" public house.

The village contains Christ Church, a United Reformed Church, and opposite is a small primary school. Church Drive Primary School is open to people living outside the village and residents. There is a war memorial by Goscombe John in the village centre in memory of soldiers that died in World War I. Port Sunlight has a water feature. The open air swimming pool is now a garden centre .

Hulme Hall was built as a women's dining hall, but is now in use as a local community centre and hosts events.

The Cottage Hospital, opened in 1907, was closed for many years but refurbished and reopened in 2008 as the Leverhulme Hotel.

Until the 1980s, all residents were employees of Unilever and their families. During this decade the houses were first sold privately. The former village school is now a working men's club.

The Port Sunlight River Park, on the banks of the River Mersey between Cammell Laird Shipyard and Bromborough Dock, opened to the public in 2014. The park is opposite Otterspool promenade and offers a view of Liverpool's waterfront, including the Anglican Cathedral and the Royal Albert Dock. It is an open, natural space that has been created on the former landfill site at Bromborough Dock. The site has been taken over by The Land Trust, 'a charity that is committed to the long term, sustainable management of open space for community benefit'. Walkways allow the public to appreciate the wildflowers and other wildlife; there is also a wetland area.

== Transport ==
The area is served by Port Sunlight, Spital, and Bebington railway stations, on the Wirral Line of the Merseyrail network. There are regular train services to Chester, Ellesmere Port and to Liverpool via Birkenhead.

== Cultural references ==
Port Sunlight was widely celebrated. In 1912, it became the subject of a hit West End musical comedy, The Sunshine Girl, at the Gaiety Theatre, London. It starred Phyllis Dare, one of the most popular pin-ups of the Edwardian era, and was written by Paul Alfred Rubens. The show introduced the tango dance to British audiences. In 1919, Lever Brothers made a 40-minute-long sponsored film, Port Sunlight, to promote the town and factory.

The Sunlight Cottages in Glasgow are rare surviving relics from the series of Great Exhibitions held in Kelvingrove Park in 1888, 1901 and 1911. These rambling, asymmetrical cottages were constructed in 1901 as replicas of two of the Port Sunlight houses. Designed in an idealised Elizabethan half-timbered style by Exhibition architect James Miller, the houses are picturesquely sited high above the Kelvin. Donated to the city of Glasgow by Lord Leverhulme after the close of the Exhibition, the cottages have been used as park workers' housing ever since.

Port Sunlight was also used as a filming location for the British television series Peaky Blinders numerous times.

== Notable people ==
Hulme Hall was the venue for drummer Ringo Starr's official debut as a member of The Beatles on 18 August 1962. It is also the site of the band's first ever broadcast interview. The interview was with local disc jockey Monty Lister and recorded for Radio Clatterbridge on 27 October 1962.

Fiona Bruce, host (2008 to present) of the long-running British television show Antiques Roadshow, grew up in Port Sunlight. In her introduction to an episode of the programme (Series 35 Episode 2) set in the village, she stood in front of her childhood home and explained that her father was a managing director of a division of Unilever.

=== Others ===
- William Owen (1846–1910), architect, collaborated in the construction of Port Sunlight
- Thomas Bartley (1874–1951), footballer, played at Port Sunlight
- James Wootton-Davies (1884–1964), politician, worked as a chemist in Port Sunlight
- Arthur Herbert Procter (1890–1973), Victoria Cross recipient, educated in Port Sunlight
- Arthur Charles Evans (1916–2011), author, employed at Lever Brothers
- Mary Wilson, Baroness Wilson of Rievaulx (1916–2018), wife of Prime Minister Harold Wilson, employed at Lever Brothers
- Sean Hughes (1946–1990), politician, employed at Unilever
- Jim Molyneux (1895–1950), footballer, born in Port Sunlight
- Pete Burns (1959–2016), singer-songwriter, television personality, born in Port Sunlight

== Gallery ==
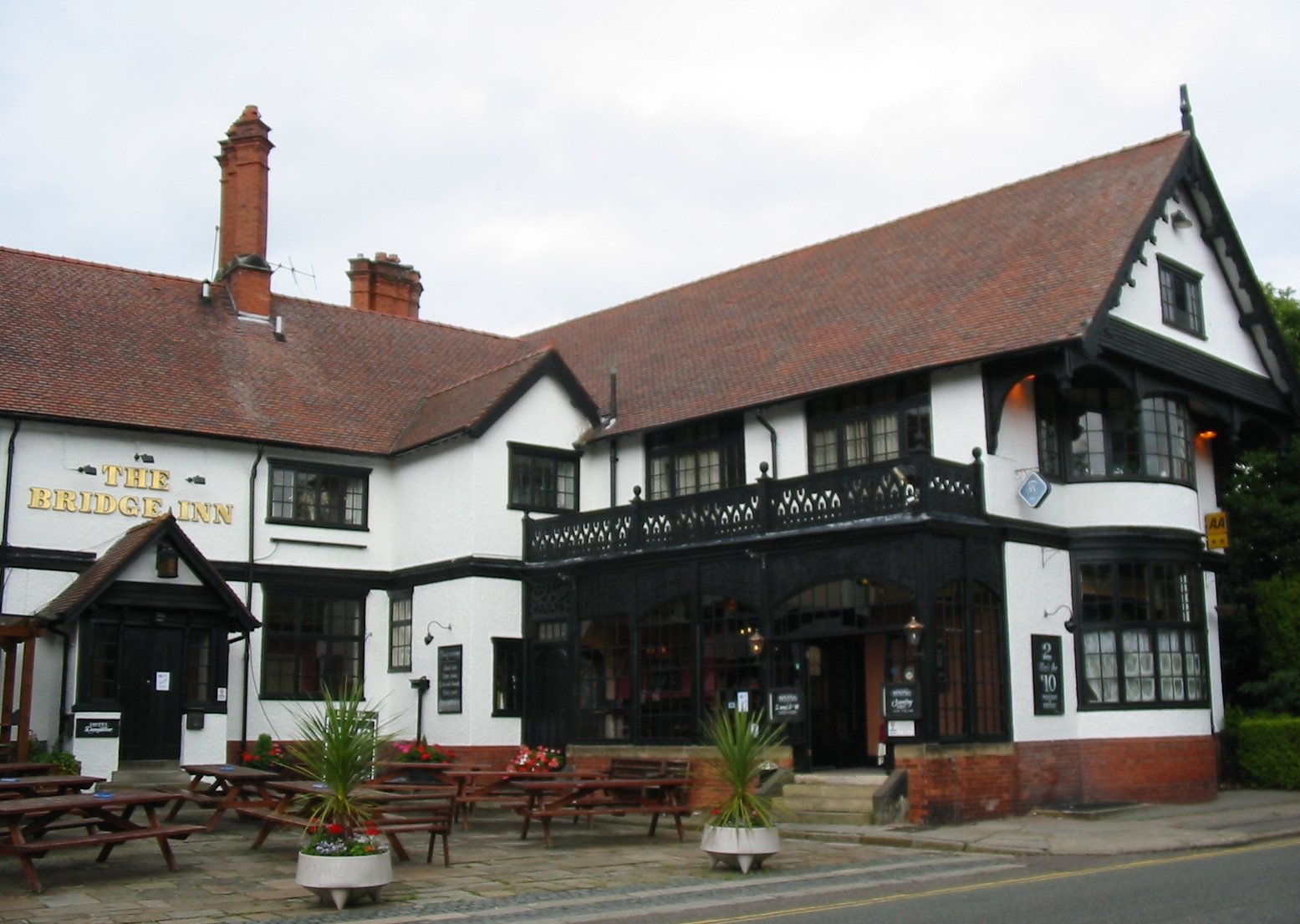
The Bridge Inn

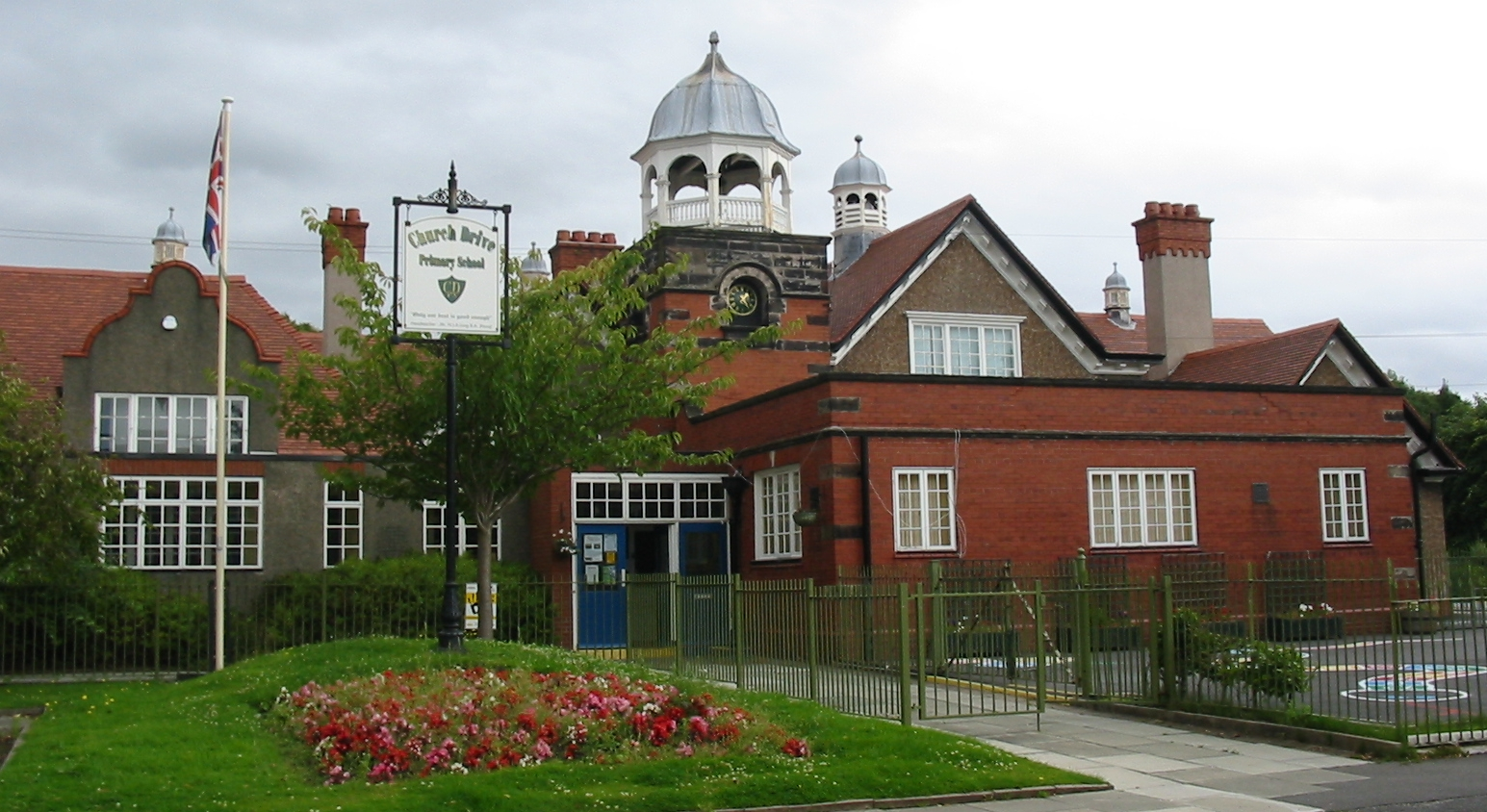
Church Drive school

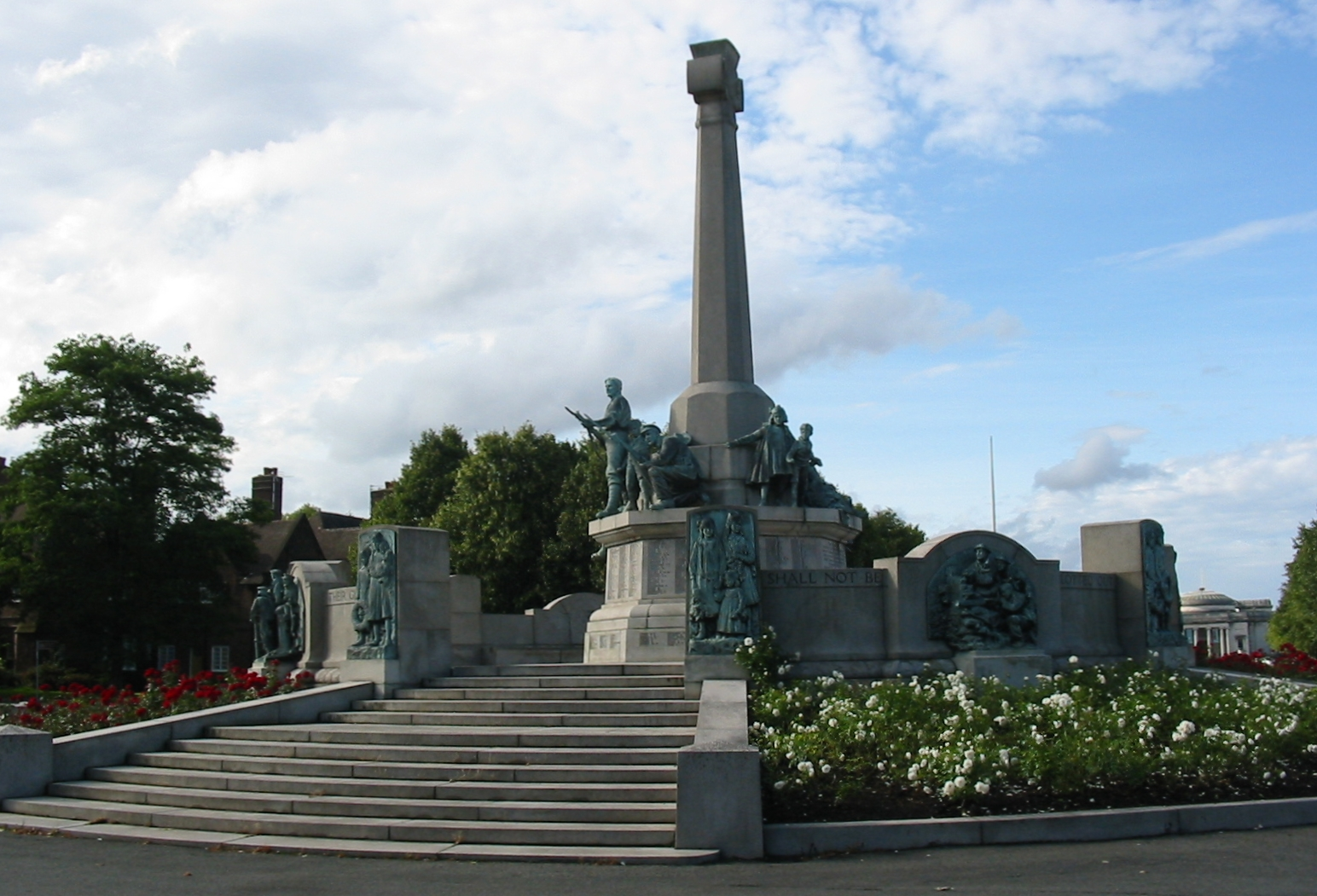
The war memorial by Goscombe John

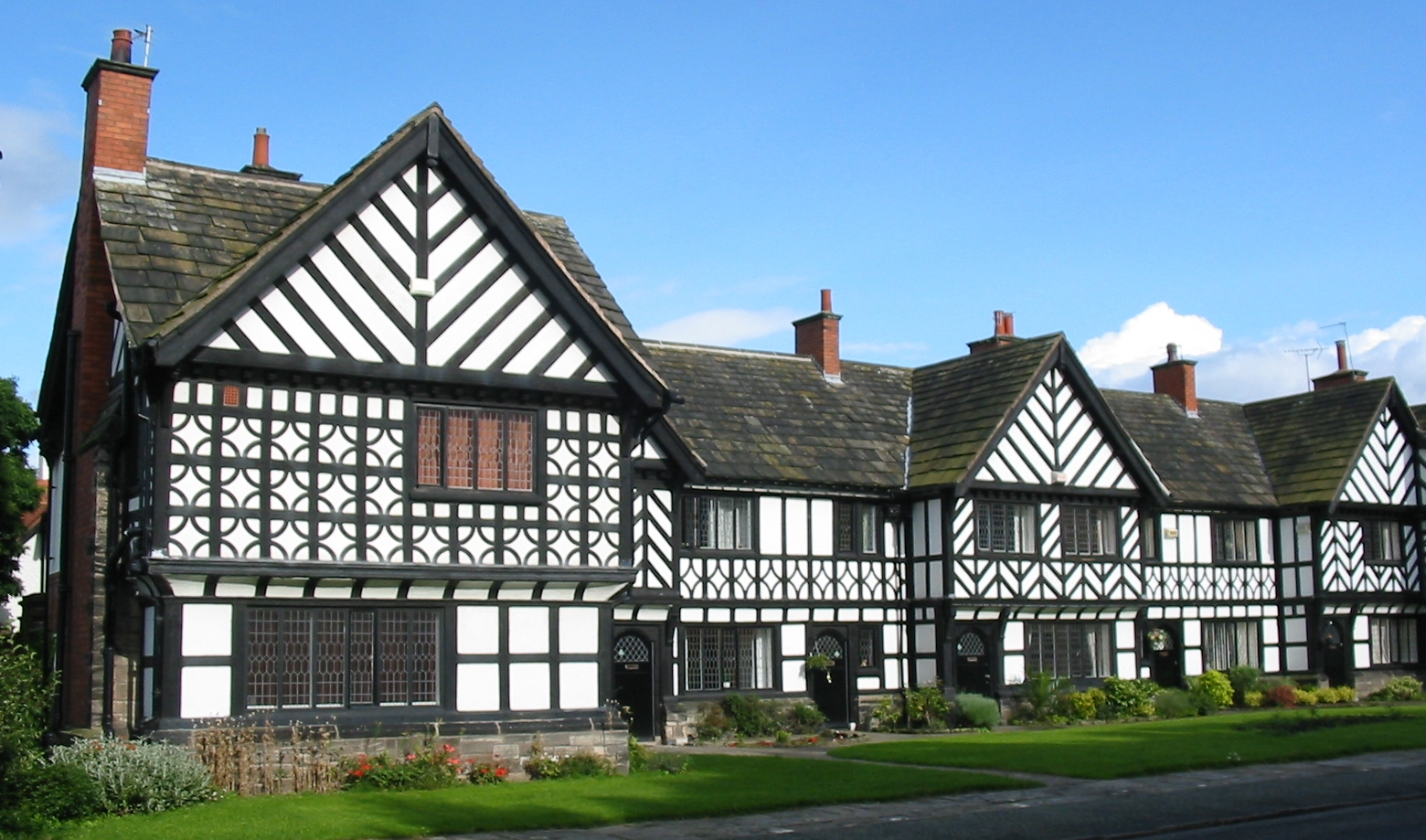

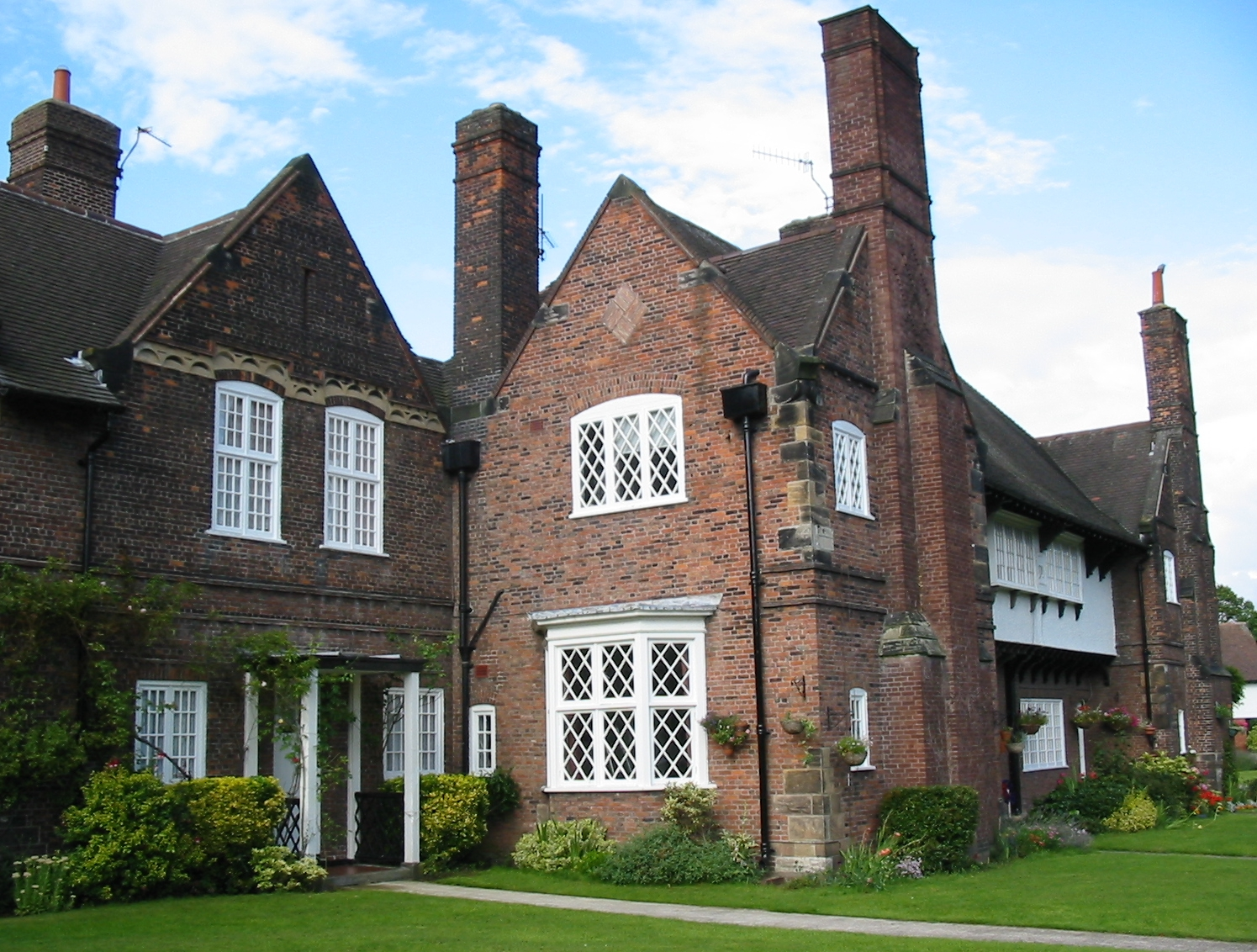

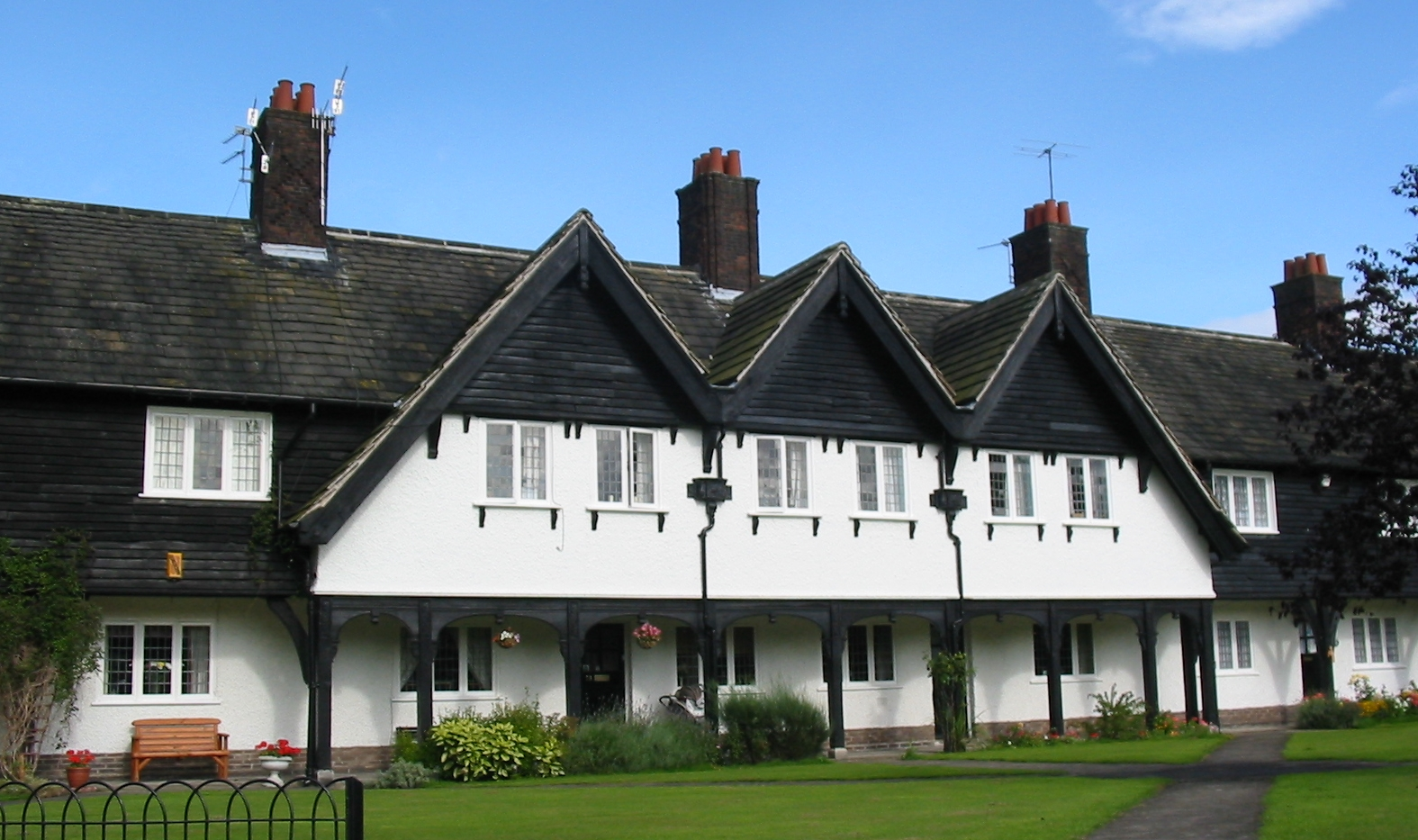

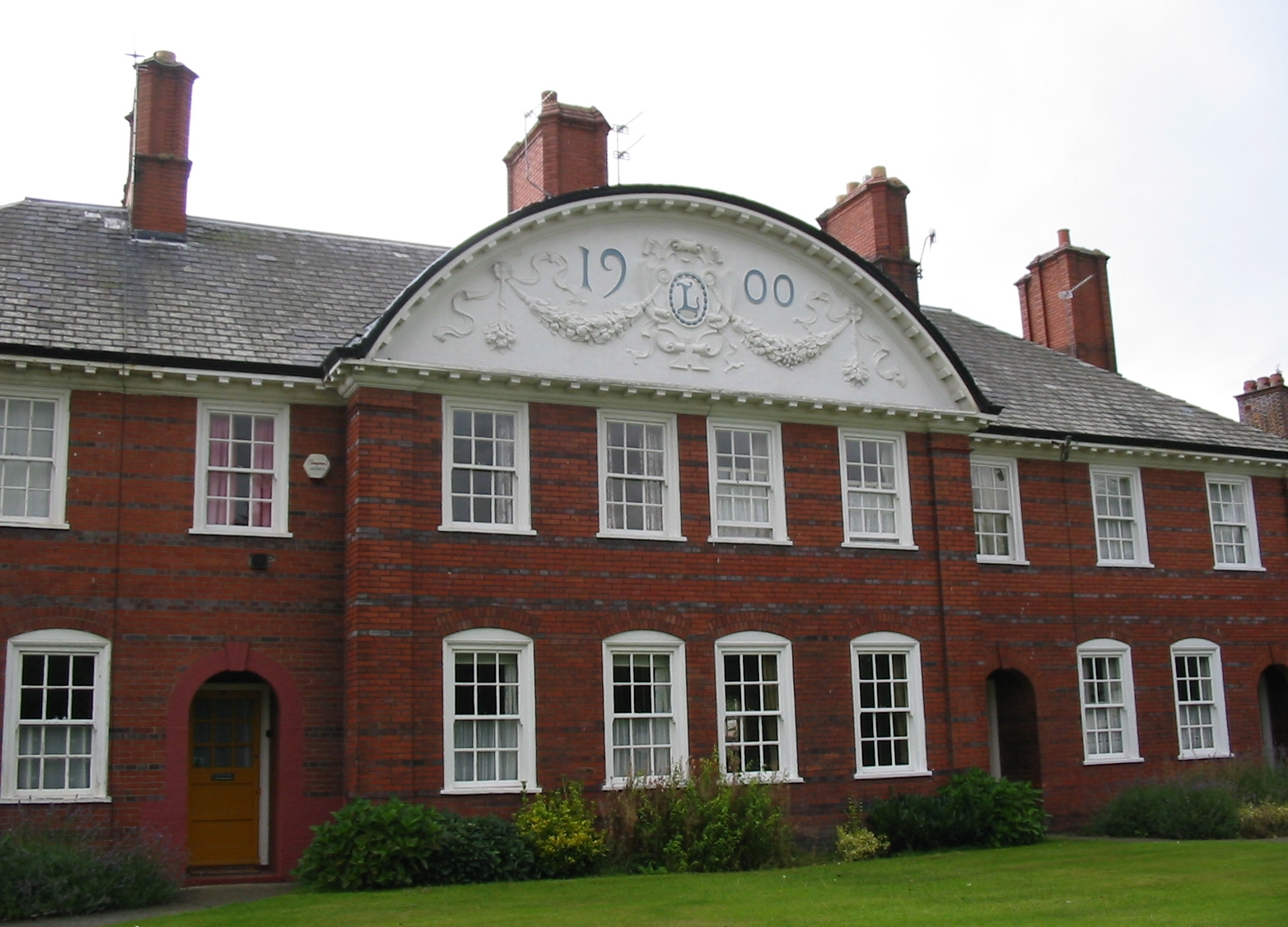

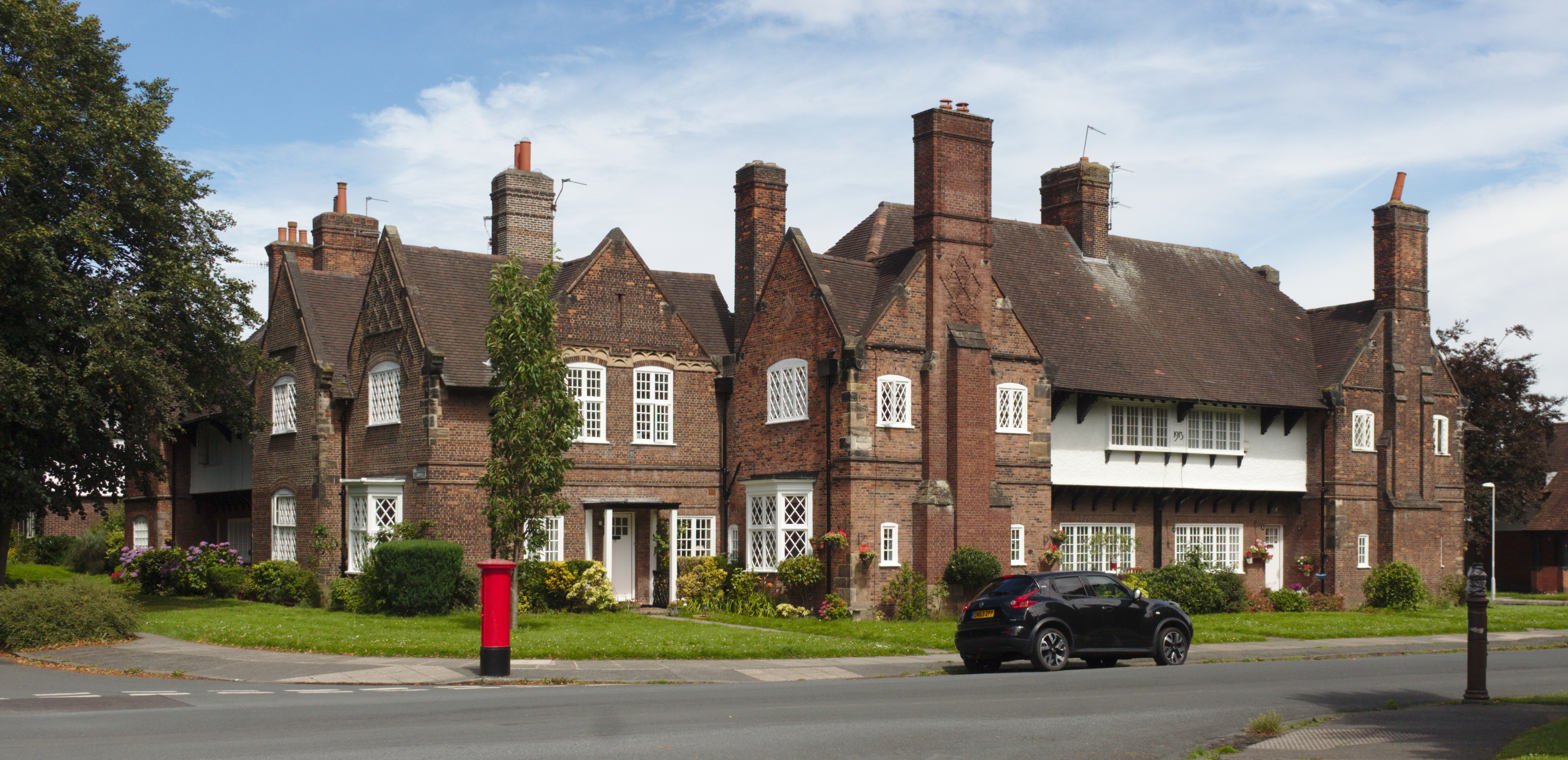

== See also ==
- Listed buildings in Port Sunlight
- Hartley Village
- Sunlight Chambers, Lever Brothers' former offices on Parliament Street, Dublin, constructed between 1900 and 1910.
- Sunlight Chambers, Lever Brothers' former offices on Bigg Market, Newcastle upon Tyne, constructed between 1901 and 1902.
- Lusanga, Kwilu, formerly Leverville, a base of operations for Lever Brothers' Huileries du Congo Belge
- Leverburgh

== Sources ==
- Beeson, Edward William (1911). Port Sunlight; the model village of England, a collection of photographs. The Architectural book publishing company.
- Macqueen, Adam (2011). The King of Sunlight: How William Lever Cleaned Up The World. Transworld. ISBN 978-1-4464-8845-4.
