= Northumberland Fusiliers Memorial =

The Response 1914
- United Kingdom
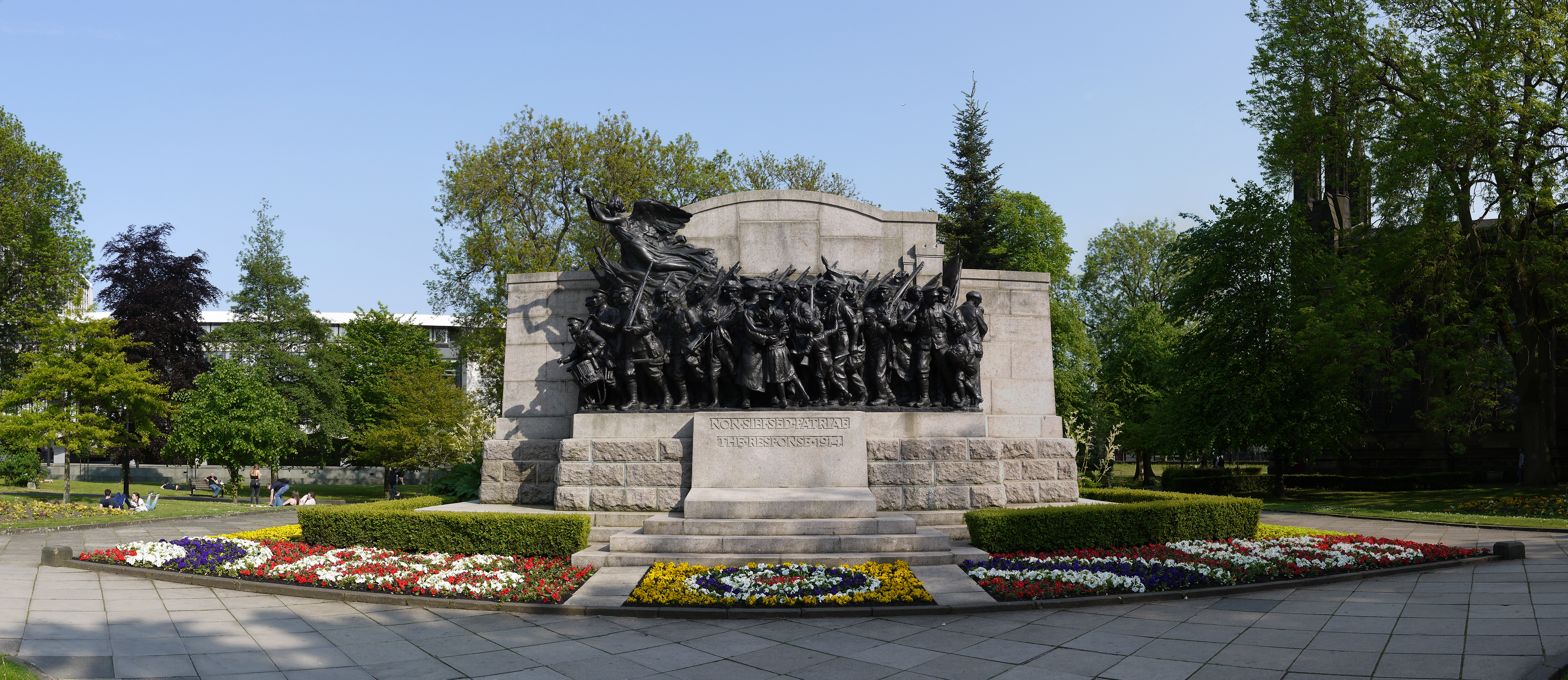
- For the Kitchener's Army "Pals" battalions of the Northumberland Fusiliers raised in World War I
- Unveiled: 5 July 1923; 103 years ago
- Location: 54.9786°N 1.6128°W: grounds of Church of St Thomas the Martyr; Newcastle upon Tyne
- Designed by: William Goscombe John
- Non sibi sed patriae; The Response 1914

Listed Building – Grade I
- Official name: The Response 1914
- Designated: 28 October 2014
- Reference no.: 1186201

The Response 1914 (also known as the Northumberland Fusiliers Memorial) is a war memorial in the public gardens to the north of the Church of St Thomas the Martyr in Barras Bridge, Newcastle upon Tyne, and to the west of Newcastle Civic Centre. Designed by Sir William Goscombe John, the memorial was commissioned by Sir George Renwick, 1st Baronet, and unveiled in 1923. It primarily commemorates the Territorial Army "Pals" battalions of the Northumberland Fusiliers raised by the local Chamber of Commerce in late 1914 for service in the First World War, which became known as the "Commercials". It also commemorates the safe return of Renwick's five sons from service in the war, and his 50 years in business as a ship-owner (he was also elected as the Member of Parliament for Newcastle-upon-Tyne and then Newcastle upon Tyne Central on three occasions between 1900 and 1922).

The memorial was designed by Sir W. Goscombe John, who also designed the Port Sunlight War Memorial.

== Design ==
The memorial has a large base of Shap granite, with three steps up to a rusticated plinth and screen wall. In total the pedestal and decoration is 8 metres (26 ft) high x 14 metres (46 ft) wide x 2.5 metres (8.2 ft) deep. The large black bronze sculpture, 3 metres (9.8 ft) high x 10 metres (33 ft) wide, was founded by A.B. Burton at the Thames Ditton Foundry of Thames Ditton. The sculpture portrays dozen of figures, including two drummer boys and men saying goodbye to their loved ones, expressing both patriotism and anguish. An angel—an allegorical depiction of Renown—blows a trumpet and flies over the crowd. The scene recalls the mobilisation of the 5th Northumberland Fusiliers in April 1915, who marched on the Great North Road to Newcastle Station. On the back of the memorial, three figures are carved into the granite. St George in the centre, is supported on a bracket formed from two seahorses, with the arms of Newcastle to either side. Two soldiers in the uniform of the Northumberland Fusiliers stand either side of St George, one from the First World War to the right, and one from the founding of the regiment in 1674 to the left. The base of the memorial is surrounded by municipal patches of flowers, which used to be a more simple patch of grass.

An inscription to the front reads Non sibi sed patriae (Latin for 'Not for himself, but for his country'), followed by the name of the sculpture, 'The Response 1914'. On the rear face, inscriptions read Quo fata vocant (Latin for 'Whither the fates call'), the motto of the Northumberland Fusiliers, and:

To commemorate the raising of the B Company 9th Battalion and the 16th, 18th and 19th Service Battalions, Northumberland Fusiliers, by the Newcastle and Gateshead Chamber of Commerce August–October 1914

The gift of Sir George Renwick Bt DL and Lady Renwick

MCMXXIII

The memorial was the gift of Sir George and Lady Renwick and unveiled on 5 July 1923 at a ceremony attended by the Prince of Wales (later Edward VIII). After restoration, it was rededicated on 25 October 2007 in the presence of Prince Philip, Duke of Edinburgh and descendants of the Renwick family. It became a listed building in 1971 and was advanced to Grade I listed status in October 2014.

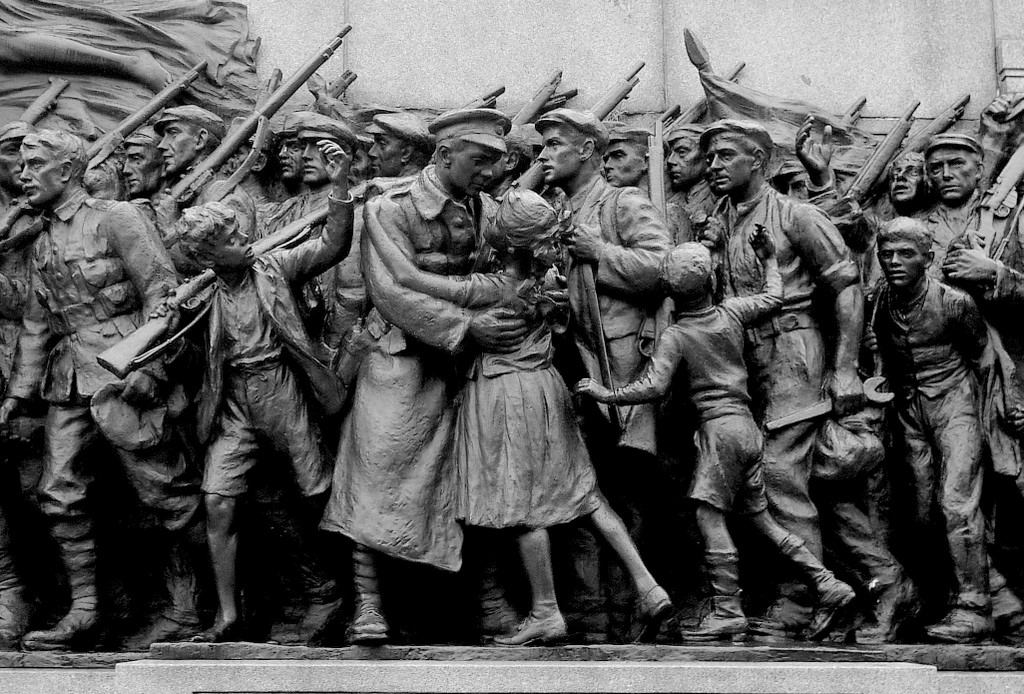
Detail

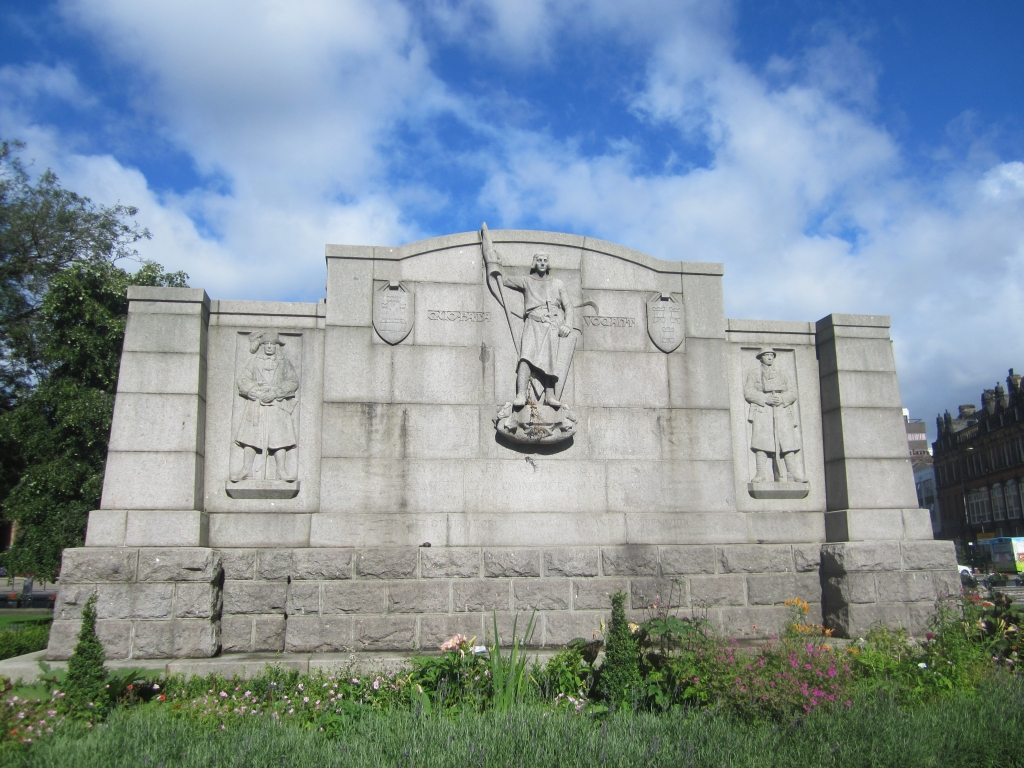
Rear elevation

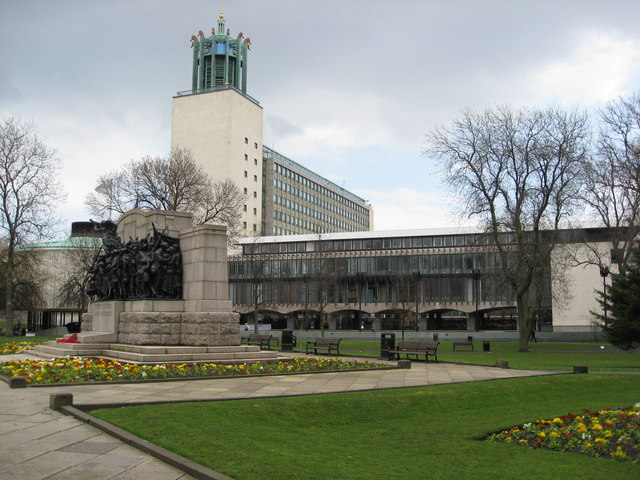
Setting beside Newcastle Civic Centre

== See also ==
- Grade I listed war memorials in England
