= Royal Sussex Memorial, Eastbourne =

War memorial in Eastbourne, East Sussex, England

Royal Sussex Memorial
- United Kingdom
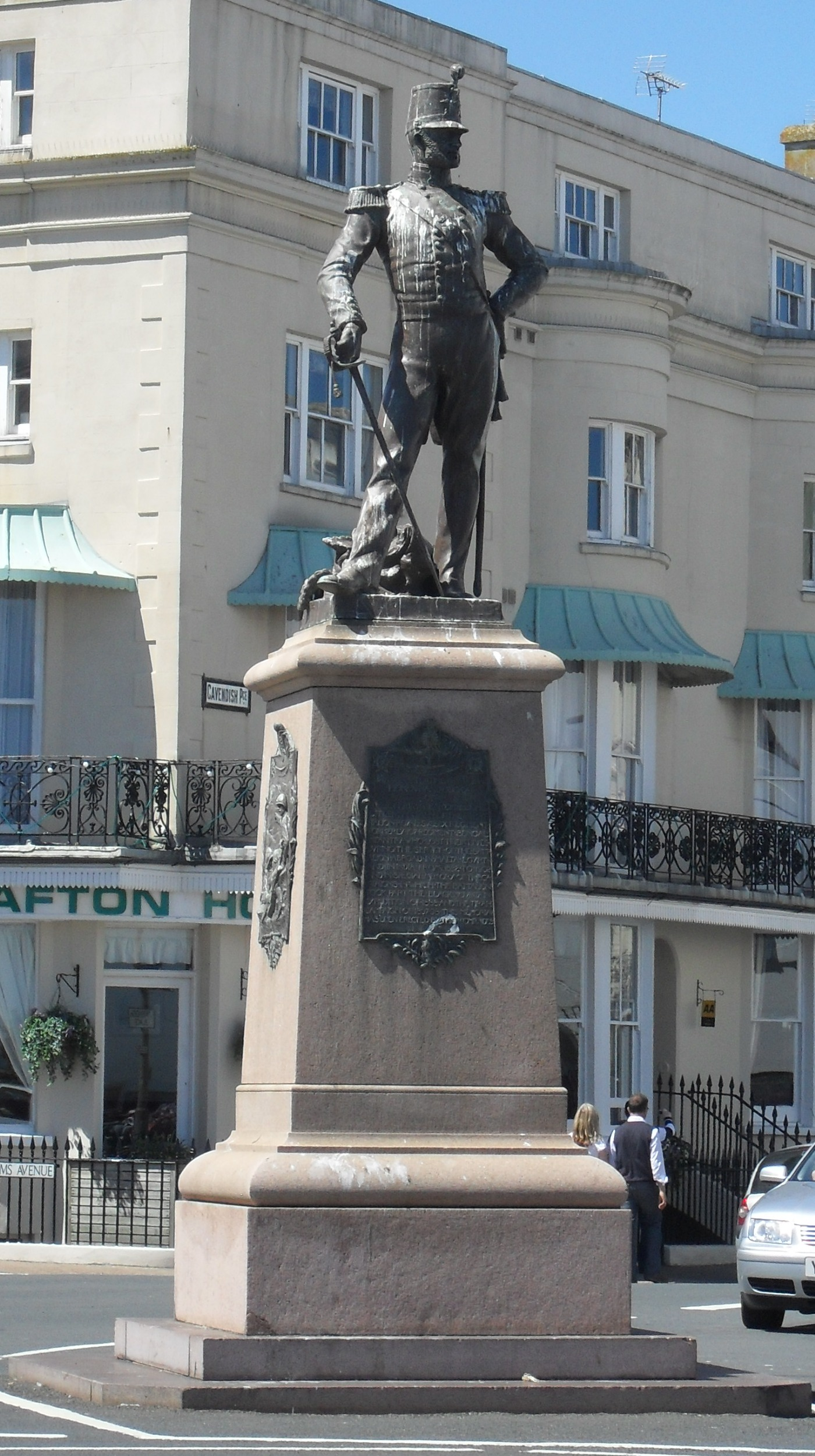
- For casualties of the Royal Sussex Regiment
- Unveiled: 7 February 1906
- Location: 50°46′03″N 0°17′32″E; Cavendish Place, Eastbourne, East Sussex
- Designed by: Goscombe John

Listed Building – Grade II*
- Official name: Bronze statue of soldier of Royal Sussex Regiment
- Designated: 17 May 1971
- Reference no.: 1043677

The Royal Sussex Memorial is a war memorial in Eastbourne, East Sussex, on the English south coast. It commemorates the Royal Sussex Regiment's casualties from various campaigns around the turn of the 20th century. Sculpted by William Goscombe John, it was unveiled in 1906 and is now a Grade II* listed building.

== Design ==
The monument stands on the seafront, at the junction of Cavendish Place and Elms Avenue, opposite the entrance to Eastbourne Pier. It consists of a sculpture of a soldier on a stone pedestal. The soldier is a young officer in the uniform the 107th (Bengal Infantry) Regiment of Foot, which became the 2nd Battalion, Royal Sussex Regiment in 1881. The officer's sword is drawn and held in his right hand at waist height pointing to his feet; his left hand rests on his hip. His uniform is that worn by the regiment prior to reforms which stemmed from the 1857 Indian Mutiny. The statue is 1.9 metres (6 feet 3 inches) tall and stands on a pedestal 3 metres (9.8 feet) high. The pedestal has bronze plaques on all four sides. The two on the sides contain reliefs of the regiment in action and two and those on the front and rear bear dedicatory inscriptions.

The dedication on the front reads "Royal Sussex Regiment: To the honour and glory of the officers, non-commissioned officers, and men of the 2nd Battalion, Royal Sussex Regiment, formerly 107 Regiment Bengal Infantry, who lost their lives during the service of the battalion abroad in Malta, Egypt, and India from 1882 to 1902, and in special memory of the campaigns in which the battalion took part: The Black Mountain Expedition of 1888 and the Tirah Campaign of 1897–98, this memorial has been erected by their comrades". The rear plaque contains the dedication "2nd Royal Sussex Regiment: Roll of officers, non-commissioned officers, and men who died while the battalion was on foreign tour of service from 21 July to 11 Dec. 1902", followed by a list of names. The pedestal is pink granite in two parts—a base and an obelisk.

== History ==
The memorial was sculpted by William Goscombe John and the metalwork cast by A. B. Burton. It was unveiled on 7 February 1906 by Henry Fitzalan-Howard, 15th Duke of Norfolk, who was an officer in the regiment and the Lord Lieutenant of Sussex. He was accompanied by a major from the regiment, which also provided a guard of honour. The soldiers were from the regiment's headquarters at Roussillon Barracks in Chichester, and arrived in Eastbourne on a special train.

The statue is a Grade II* listed building, first listed in 1971. Listed building status provides legal protection from unauthorised demolition or modification and is applied to structures of historical and architectural importance.

== See also ==
- Royal Sussex Regiment Memorial, Brighton, contemporary memorial to the same regiment in Brighton
- Listed buildings in Eastbourne
- Grade II* listed buildings in East Sussex
- Grade II* listed war memorials in England
