= RAMC Memorial, Aldershot =

Sculpture in Rushmoor, Hampshire, England

Coordinates: 51°15′13″N 0°45′40″W

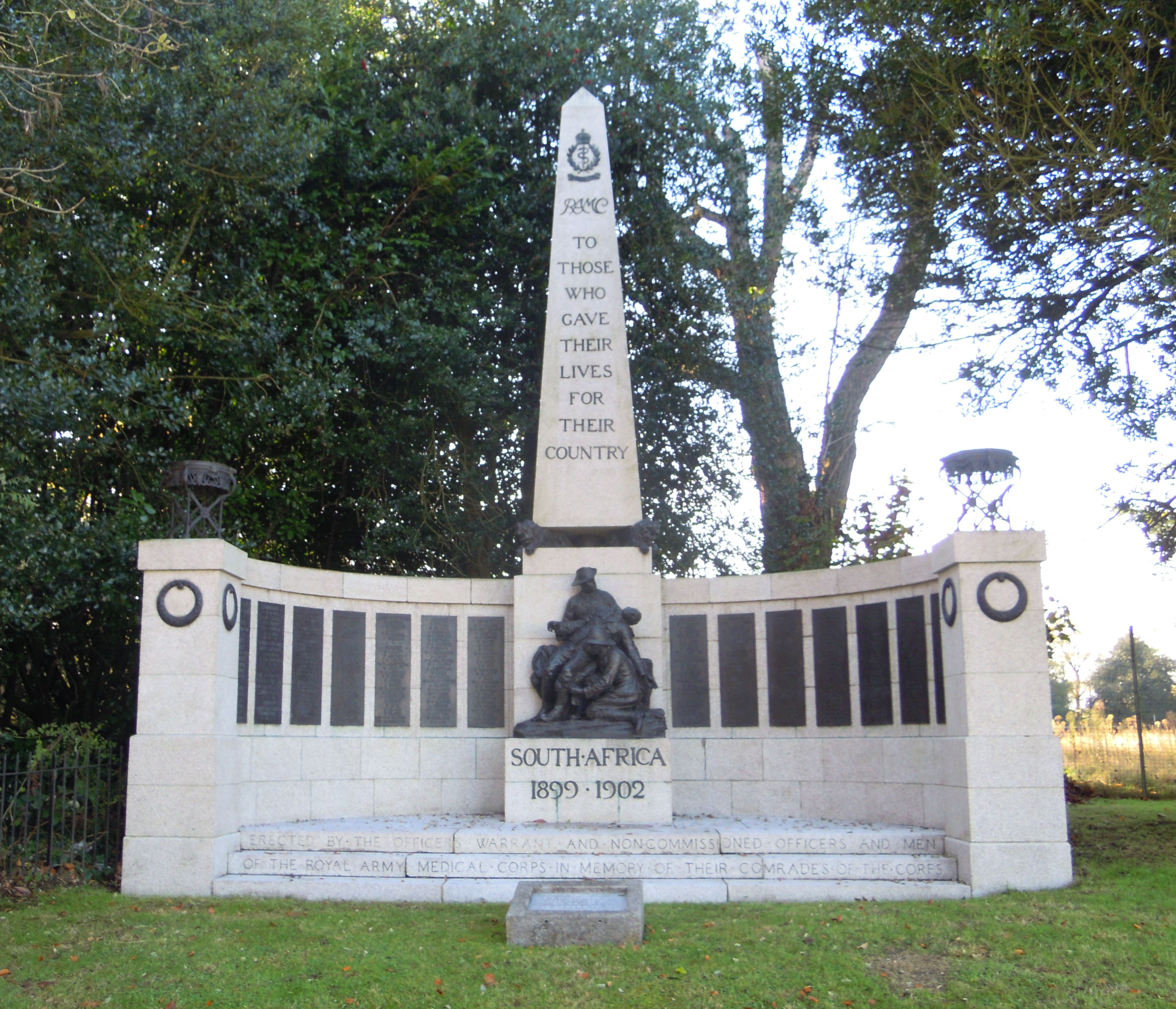
The RAMC Memorial at Aldershot in Hampshire

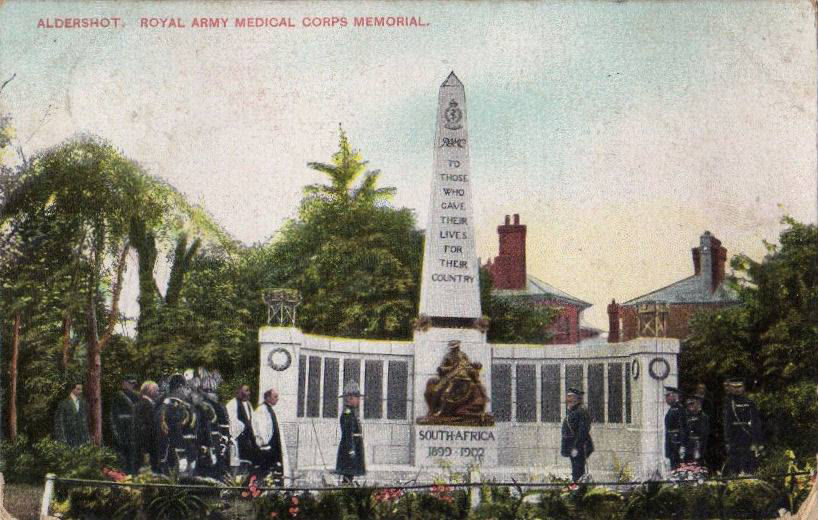
Edward VII (right) dedicating the memorial in 1905

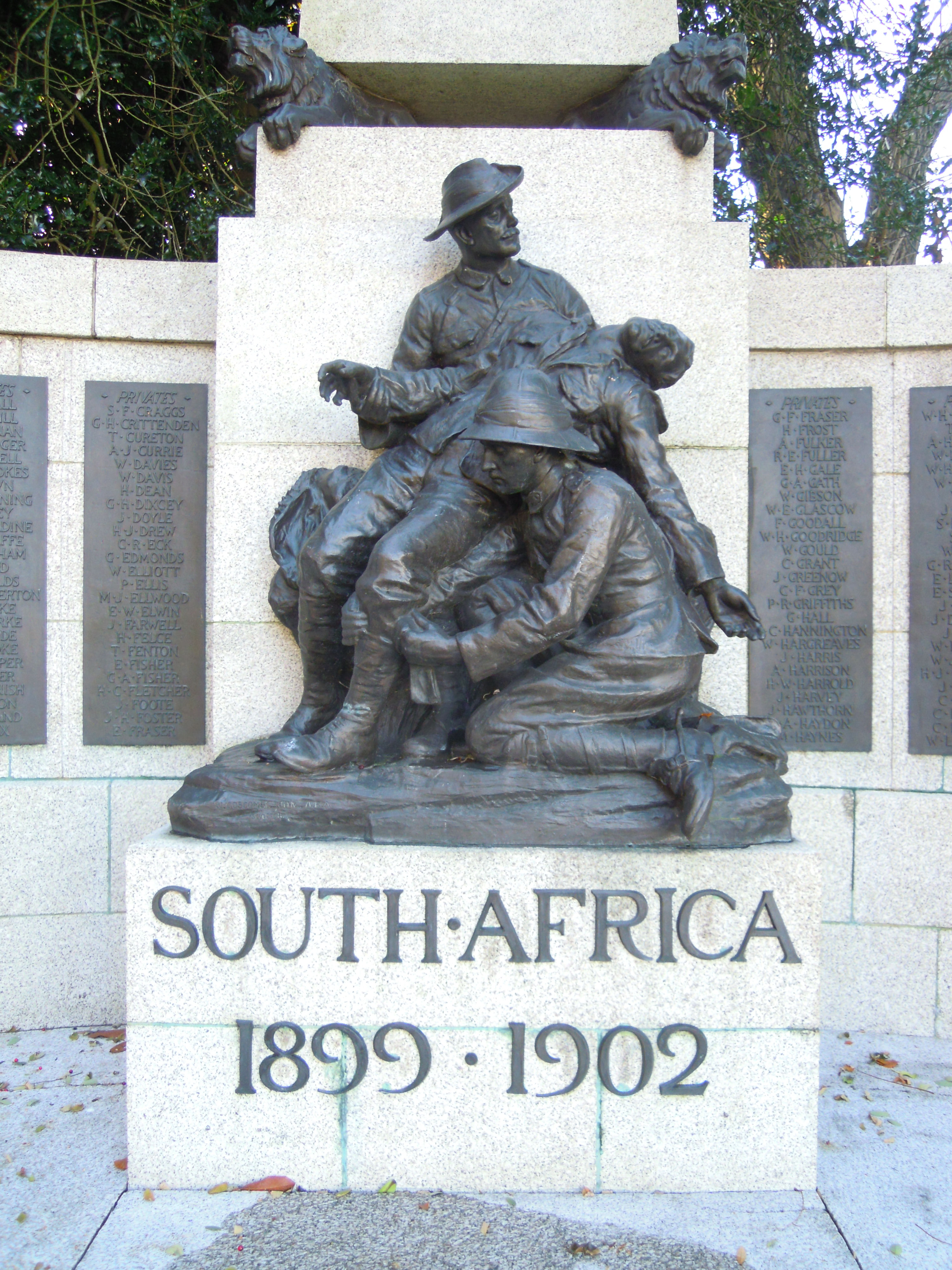
The figural group by Goscombe John on the RAMC Memorial in Aldershot (1905)

The RAMC Memorial at Aldershot in Hampshire is a monument commemorating the men of the Royal Army Medical Corps who lost their lives during the Boer War of 1899 to 1902. It is a Grade II listed structure.

Located at the top of the town's Gun Hill and placed near to the former Cambridge Military Hospital, the memorial was dedicated by Edward VII on Empire Day - 24 May 1905, and this is commemorated by a small plaque lying before the steps of the memorial.

The memorial commemorates the 314 officers and men of the Royal Army Medical Corps who died in the Boer War - namely, one Colonel, two Surgeon Lieutenant-Colonels of the Militia Staff Corps, six Majors, five Captains, five Lieutenants, two Quartermasters, two Sergeant-Majors, nine Staff Sergeants, nine Sergeants, five Lance Sergeants, eighteen Corporals, five Lance-Corporals and 243 Privates.

The granite and bronze memorial is in the form of a three stepped semi-circular base with a wall behind. In the centre is a mounted obelisk with a sculptural group placed at the base. The 14 bronze name plaques placed on the front of the wall record the names of the 314 soldiers who lost their lives in the conflict.

The sculpted group by the Welsh sculptor Sir William Goscombe John RA is formed by two men of the Royal Army Medical Corps (RAMC) tending to a wounded man lying on a stretcher in a pietà composition. The wounded soldier lies in the arms of a RAMC Orderly while his left leg is bandaged by a Medical Officer. The inscription reads: "Erected by the Officers, Warrant and Non-Commissioned Officers and men of the Royal Army Medical Corps in memory of their comrades of the Corps." The architectural setting is by the Scottish Arts and Crafts architect and landscape designer Robert Weir Schultz. The sculpted group was cast by A.B. Burton at the Thames Ditton Foundry.

The memorial has been a Grade II listed structure since 2010.
