= Thames Ditton Foundry =

Coordinates: 51°23′36″N 0°20′00″W

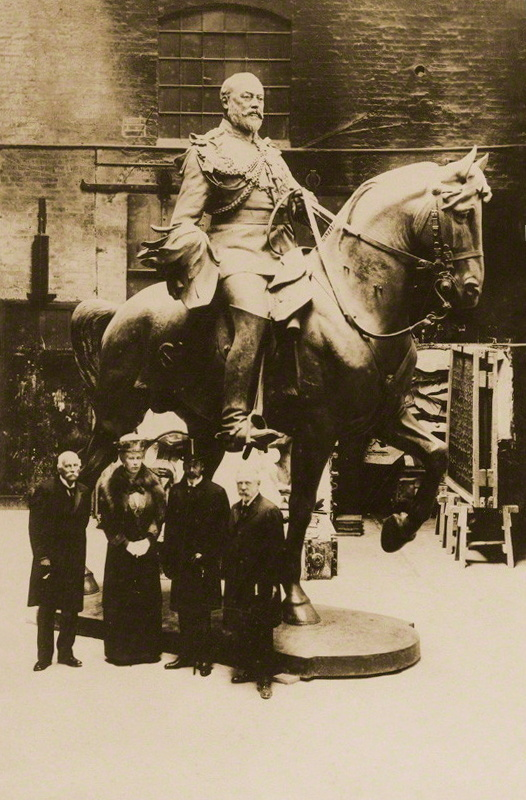
Sir Thomas Brock (left) with King George V and Queen Mary at the Works of A. B. Burton (right) at Thames Ditton, 28 May 1921; standing beneath Brock's statue of Edward VII

The Thames Ditton Foundry was a foundry in Thames Ditton, Surrey, which operated from 1874 to 1939 and which under various owners produced numerous major statues and monuments as one of the United Kingdom's leading firms of bronze founders.

== Owners ==
Located in Summer Road in Thames Ditton, just outside the Greater London area, the Thames Ditton Foundry is believed to have been built on the site of an historic "melting house" beside the River Thames. Its owners were: Cox & Sons (1874–80), Drew & Co. (1880–82), Moore & Co. (1882–97), Hollinshead & Burton (1897–1902) and A. B. Burton (1902–39).

== Works by the foundry (1874–1903) ==
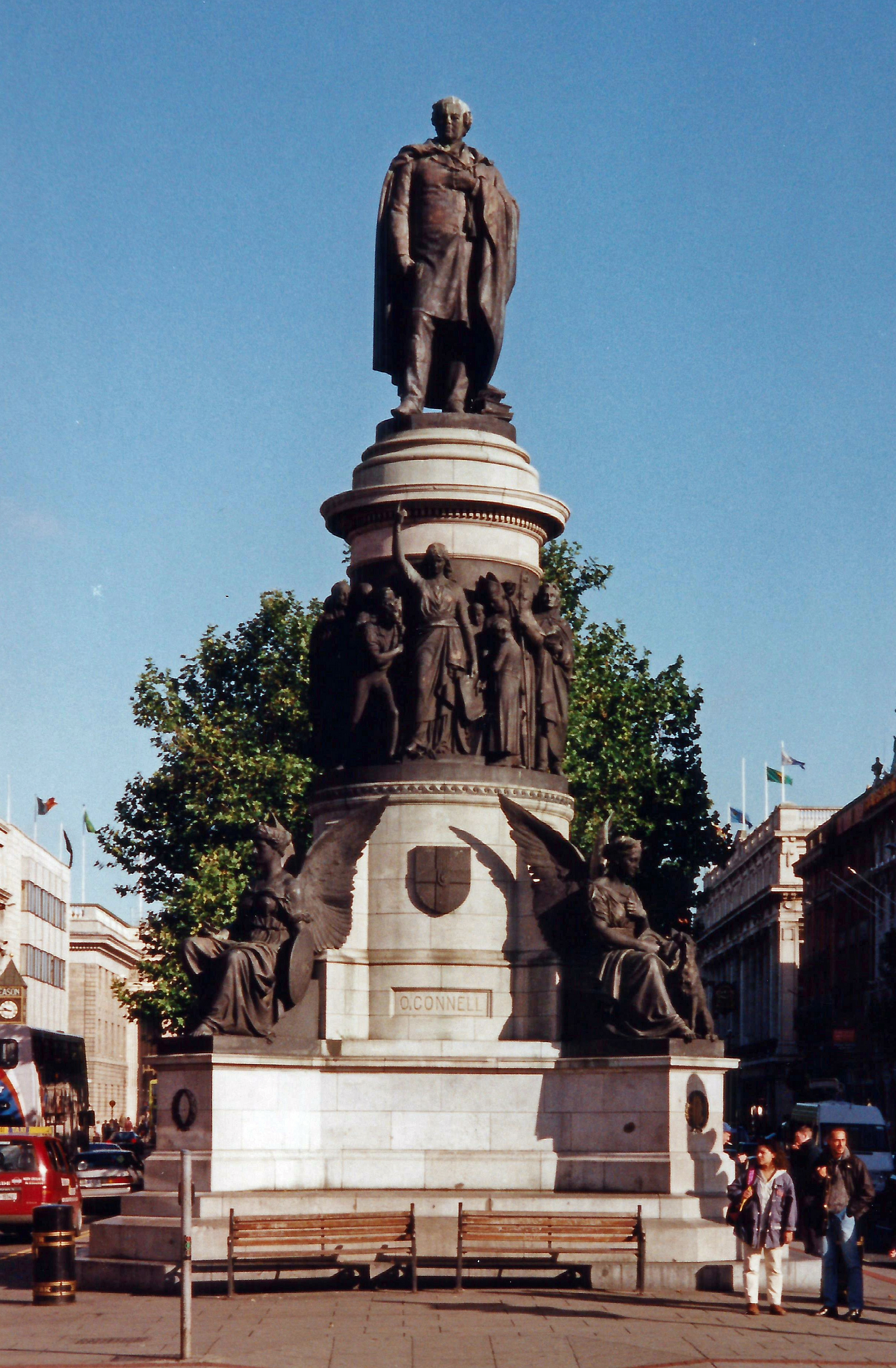
Statue of Daniel O’Connell in Dublin by Thomas Brock (1881)

The foundry was established in Summer Road, Thames Ditton, in 1874 by Cox & Sons, a large firm of ecclesiastical furnishing suppliers, to cast ornaments and statues in bronze. A hand-operated gantry crane, which moved the entire foundry floor to facilitate all major lifting work, was an integral part of the building constructed for this work. When the factory was demolished in 1976 this crane was preserved by the Surrey Archaeological Society.

The foundry was a leader in its field and produced fine bronze statues which it exported worldwide, including Matthew Noble's statue of the Earl of Derby in Parliament Square, Westminster (1874), Thomas Thornycroft's equestrian statue of the Earl of Mayo for Calcutta (1875), Matthew Noble's Oliver Cromwell in Manchester (1875) and his Robert Peel in Parliament Square (1876), Thomas Brock's William Rathbone in Liverpool, George E. Ewing's Robert Burns (1876), Frederic Leighton's An Athlete wrestling with a Python (1877), John Mossman's David Livingstone (1877), Thomas Woolner's John Stuart Mill (1877) on the Victoria Embankment and Captain James Cook in Sydney, Australia (1878), Richard Belt's Lord Byron at Hyde Park (1880), Thomas Brock's Robert Raikes in the Victoria Embankment Gardens (1880) and Daniel O’Connell in Dublin (1881), William Hamo Thornycroft's statue of General Gordon and related reliefs in the Victoria Embankment Gardens (1888) and his John Bright in Rochdale (1891).

Other works by the foundry include Joseph Edgar Boehm's statues of Lord Lawrence in Waterloo Place (1882), Francis Drake in Tavistock (1882–83), William Tyndale in the Victoria Embankment Gardens (1884), the Duke of Wellington in Hyde Park Corner (1884–1888), Queen Victoria in Sydney (1885–1888), and the equestrian Prince Albert in Windsor Great Park (1890), among others. They cast Thomas Brock’s Sir Bartle Frere in the Victoria Embankment Gardens (1888), Thomas Woolner's Bishop Dr James Fraser in Albert Square, Manchester (1888), George Anderson Lawson's Robert Burns in Ayr (1891), Albert Toft's Henry Richard in Tregaron (1893) and Frederick William Pomeroy's statue of Queen Victoria in Chester Castle (1903).

== A. B. Burton ==
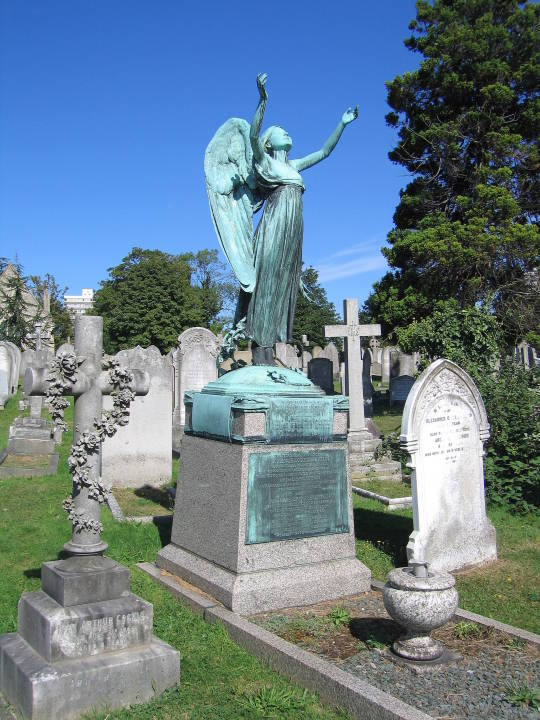
The funerary figure cast by Thames Ditton Foundry on the grave of A. B. Burton and his family in Bonner Hill Cemetery

From 1902 to 1933 the Thames Ditton Foundry came under the sole ownership of Arthur Bryan Burton (1860 – 25 July 1933), the son of Eliza and Frederick Burton, a carpenter and joiner. Born in Surbiton, Burton was apprenticed at the age of 16 to the bronze foundry of Cox & Sons in Thames Ditton. Burton later opened his own foundry in Southsea Road, Kingston, before buying into the Thames Ditton Foundry in 1897, becoming the co-owner with Arthur John Hollinshead. In 1887 he married Florence Louisa Moore (1859–1932), the daughter of the foundry’s then owner, James John Moore. Button's daughter, also named Florence, married Louis Richard Tricker (1884–1963) in 1913. A younger daughter, Dorothy "Dolly" Frances Victoria Burton (1893–1908) died aged 14.

Following the death of his partner Arthur John Hollinshead in 1902, Burton became the sole owner of the Thames Ditton Foundry. He served as a councillor on Surbiton Council and was a deacon of Surbiton Park Congregational Church, a Sunday school teacher and a benefactor of the Scout Movement. He was a Special Constable during World War I. On his death in 1933 Burton was buried with his daughter Dolly and his wife Florence in Bonner Hill Cemetery. Above their grave, atop a granite plinth, is a statue in bronze of a winged angel with arms outstretched reaching up. This had been cast in Burton's own foundry.

After Burton's death the business was continued under his name by his son-in-law, Louis Tricker. In 1939 at the start of World War II Tricker closed the foundry and sold the premises rather than see it used for manufacturing munitions. It was after used by London Metal Warehouses for making industrial castings and then by Metal Centres Ltd as a metal warehouse until 1971/2 when it was sold to the District Council. The foundry was demolished in 1976 and the crane removed for preservation by the Surrey Archaeological Society. Today Burton Court stands on the site.

=== Works cast by A. B. Burton ===
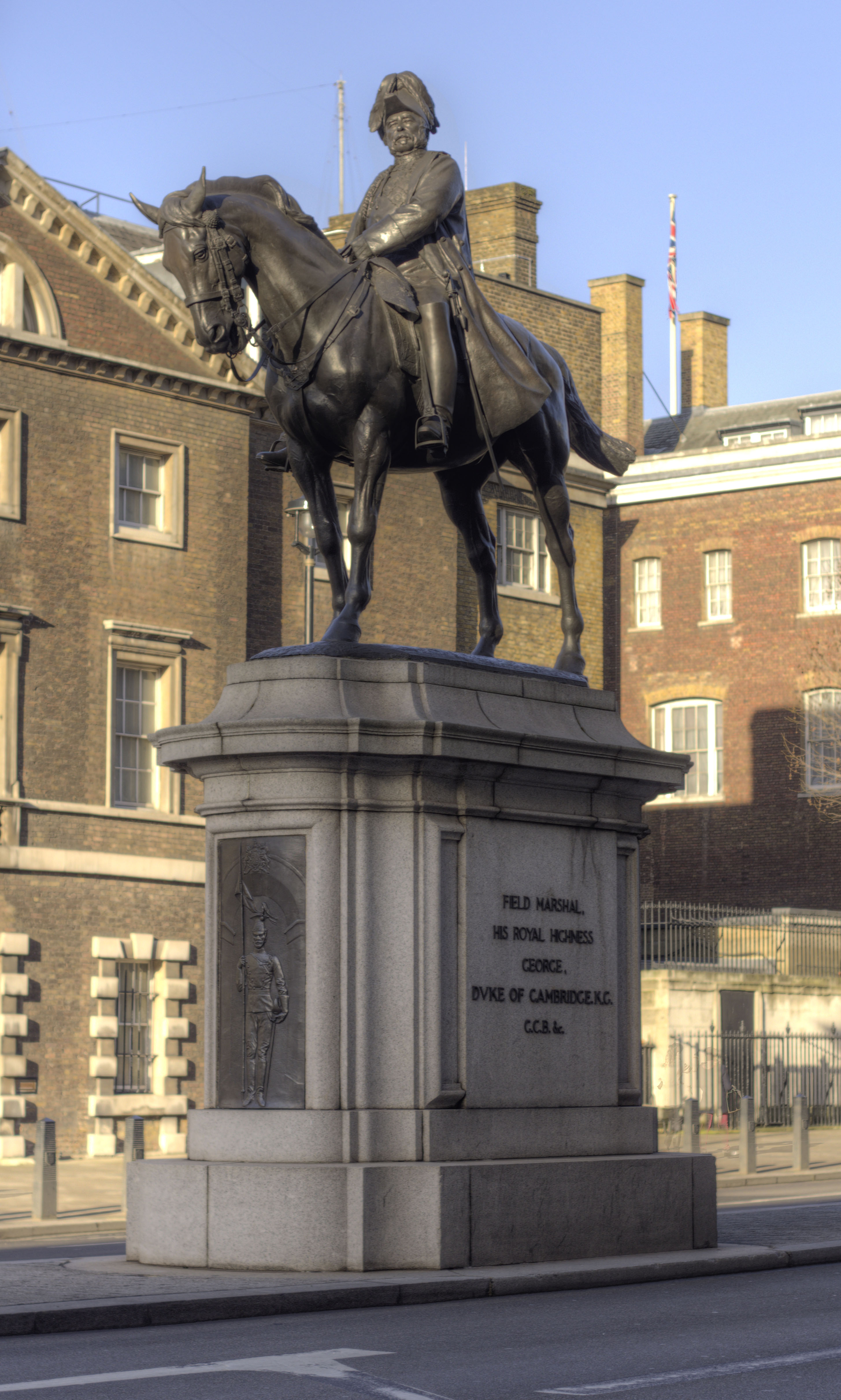
The equestrian statue of Prince George, Duke of Cambridge by Adrian Jones in Whitehall (1909)

Works from this period include Frederick William Pomeroy's relief of Archbishop Frederick Temple in St Paul's Cathedral (1905), George Frederic Watts's Physical Energy in Kensington Gardens (1907), Goscombe John's figures for the Monument to the King's Liverpool Regiment in Liverpool (1905), the figural group on the RAMC Memorial in Aldershot (1905), the equestrian statue of King Edward VII in Liverpool (1916) and the statue of General F. S. Maude in front of the British Residency in Baghdad (1922). For Adrian Jones Burton cast the equestrian statue of the Duke of Cambridge in Whitehall (1909) and the forty-ton Quadriga on the Wellington Arch in Hyde Park Corner (1910–11), one of the largest bronzes ever cast in Britain.

Bronzes cast for Bertram Mackennal include statues in England and Australia such as the memorial statue of Edward VII in Adelaide (1920), the equestrian memorial of Edward VII in Melbourne (1920), the recumbent tomb effigy of the Duke of Norfolk in Arundel Castle (1922), various figures for the Shakespeare Memorial in Sydney (1924). For Thomas Brock Burton cast, among other works, two subsidiary groups for the Victoria Memorial facing Buckingham Palace (1916). For Cecil Brown he cast the Imperial Camel Corps Memorial (1920–21) in the Victoria Embankment Gardens and for John Tweed his statue of Lord Kitchener (1926) on Horse Guards Parade. For Arthur George Walker and Peter Hills he cast the statue of Emmeline Pankhurst in the Victoria Tower Gardens (1930), and for Alfred Gilbert the Queen Alexandra Memorial at Marlborough House (1930–1932).

== Bronzes cast by Thames Ditton Foundry ==
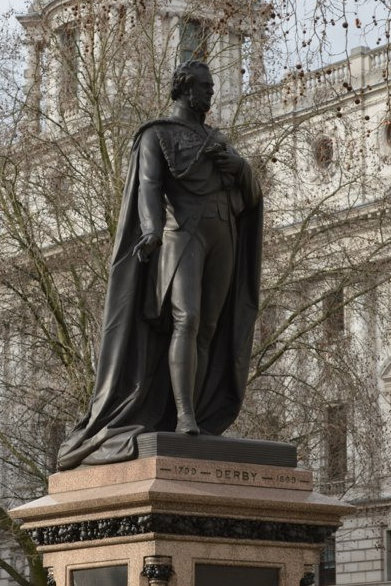
Matthew Noble, Statue of the Earl of Derby, London (1874)

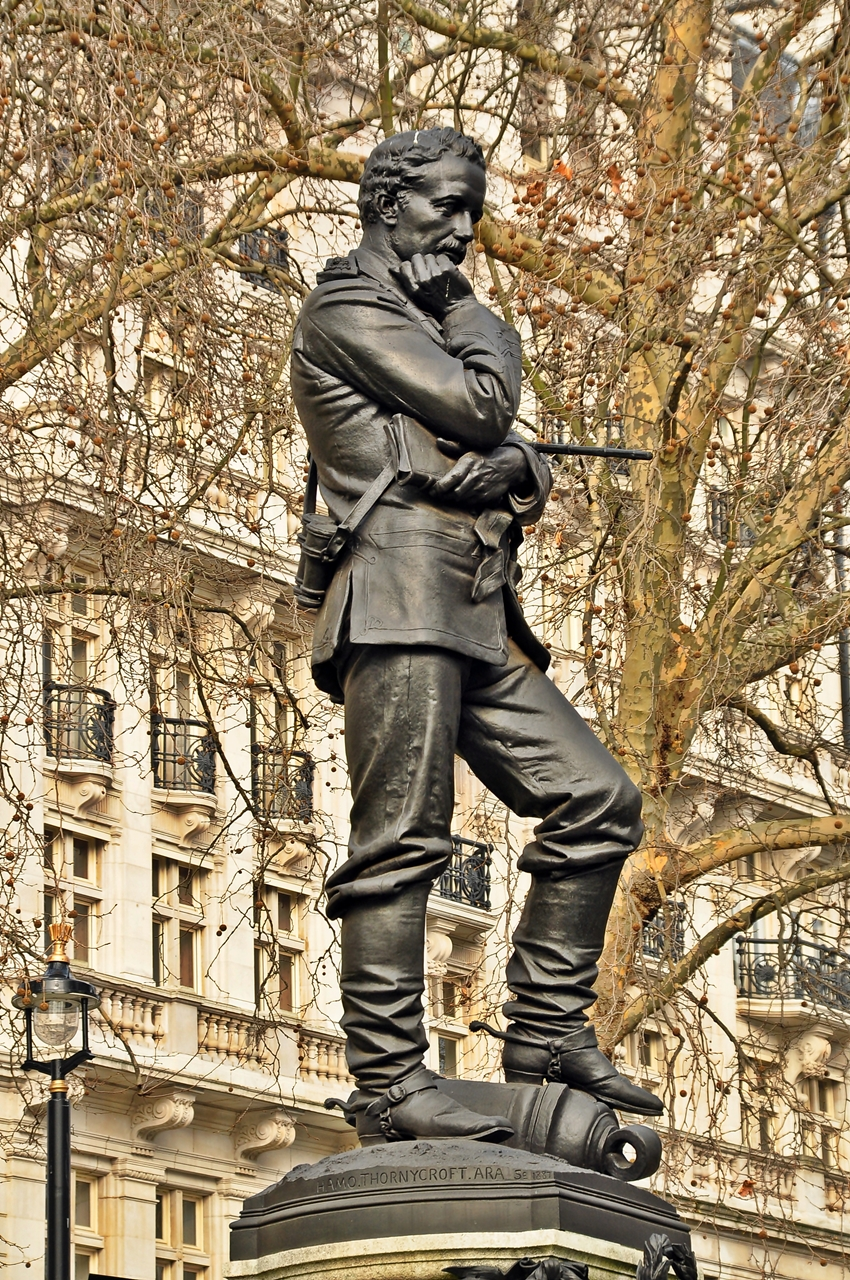
Hamo Thornycroft, Statue of General Gordon, London (1891)

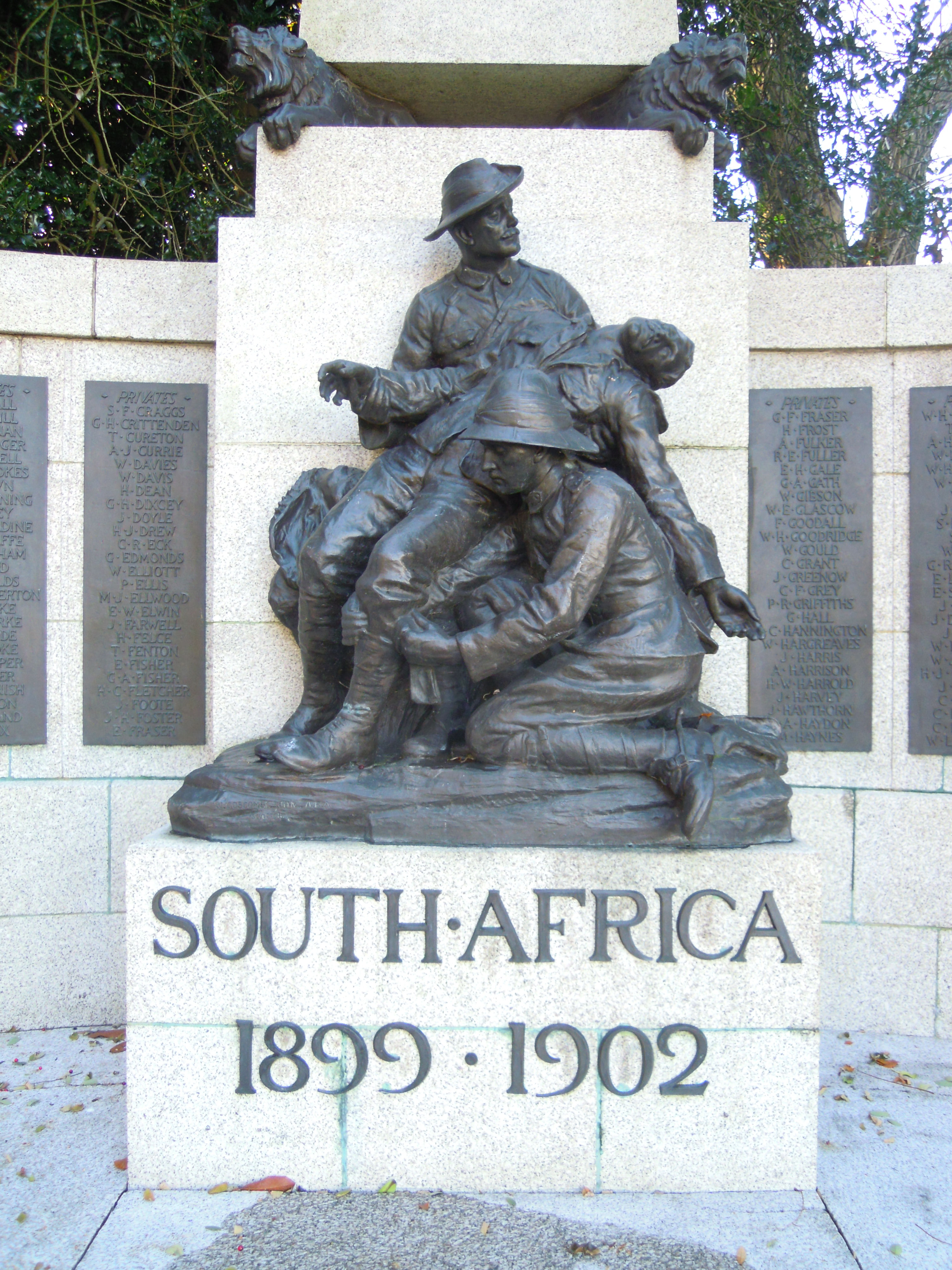
Goscombe John, Figural group on the RAMC Memorial, Aldershot (1905)

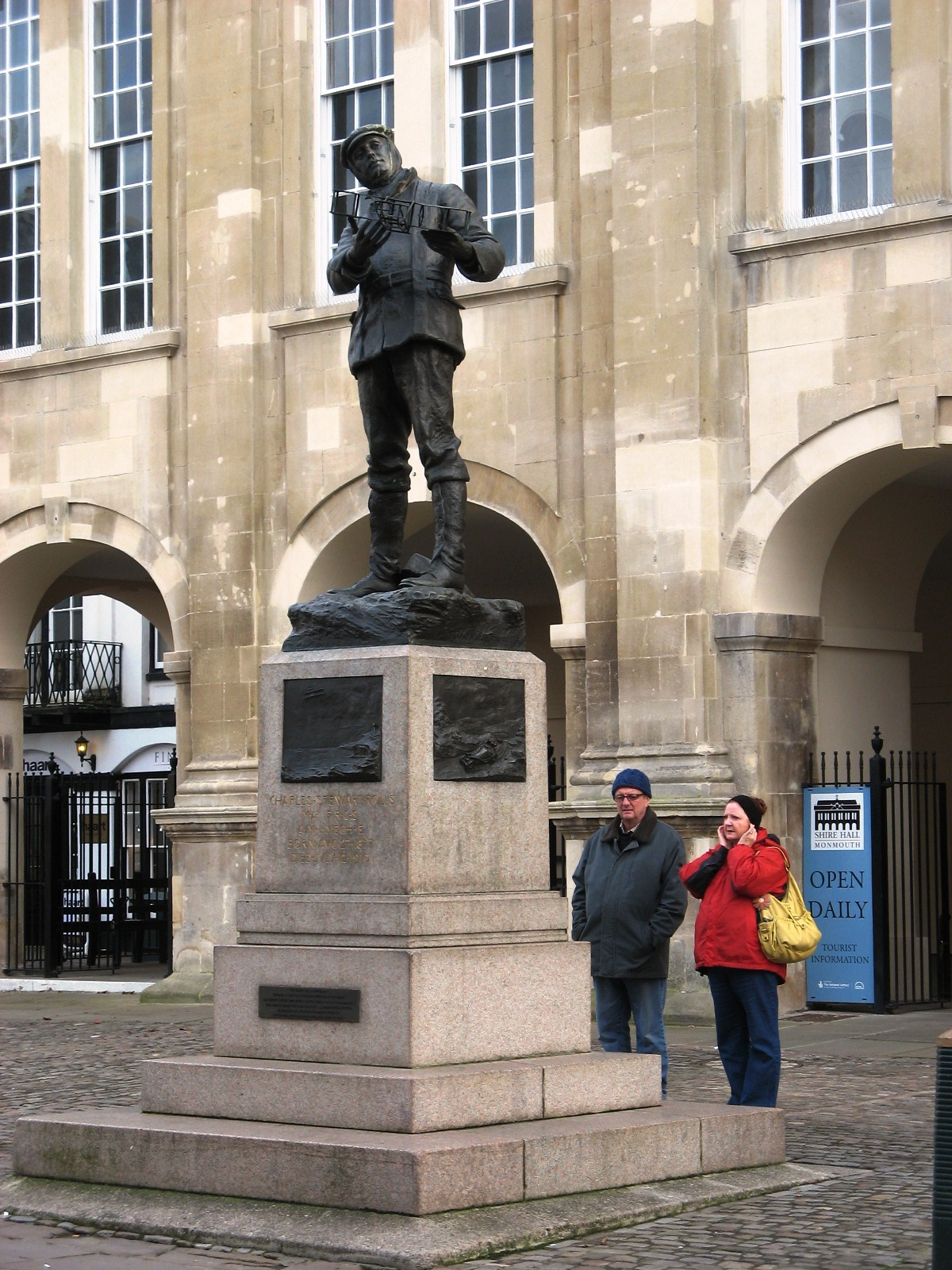
Goscombe John, Statue of Charles Rolls, Monmouth (1911)

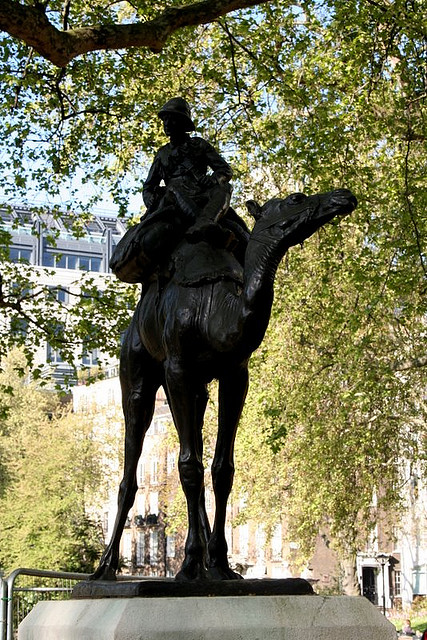
Cecil Brown, Imperial Camel Corps Memorial, London (1921)

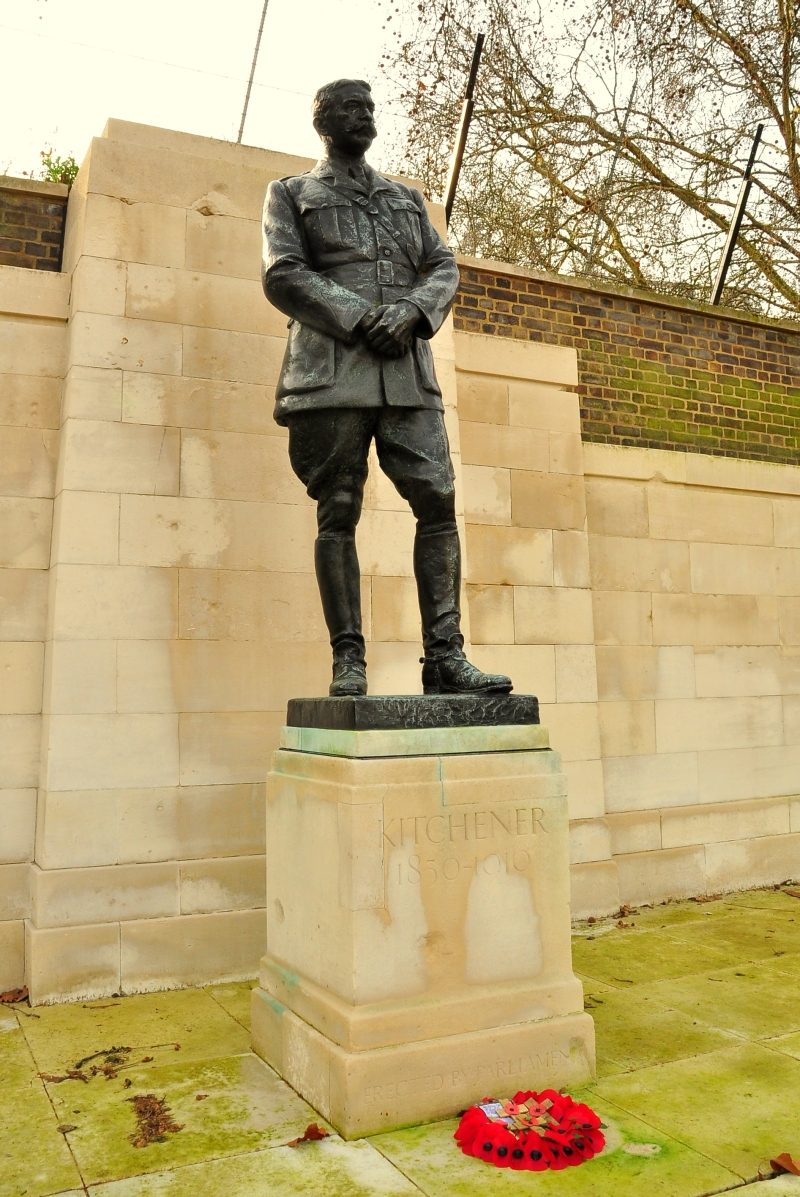
John Tweed, Statue of Lord Kitchener, London (1926)

The Horse Memorial to the horses who died in the Boer Wars, is placed at the corner of Rink Street and Cape Road in Port Elizabeth South Africa.

The G F Watts Physical Energy man on horse statue in Kensington Gardens cast by AB Burton of Thames Ditton
