= Non sibi sed patriae =

Latin phrase

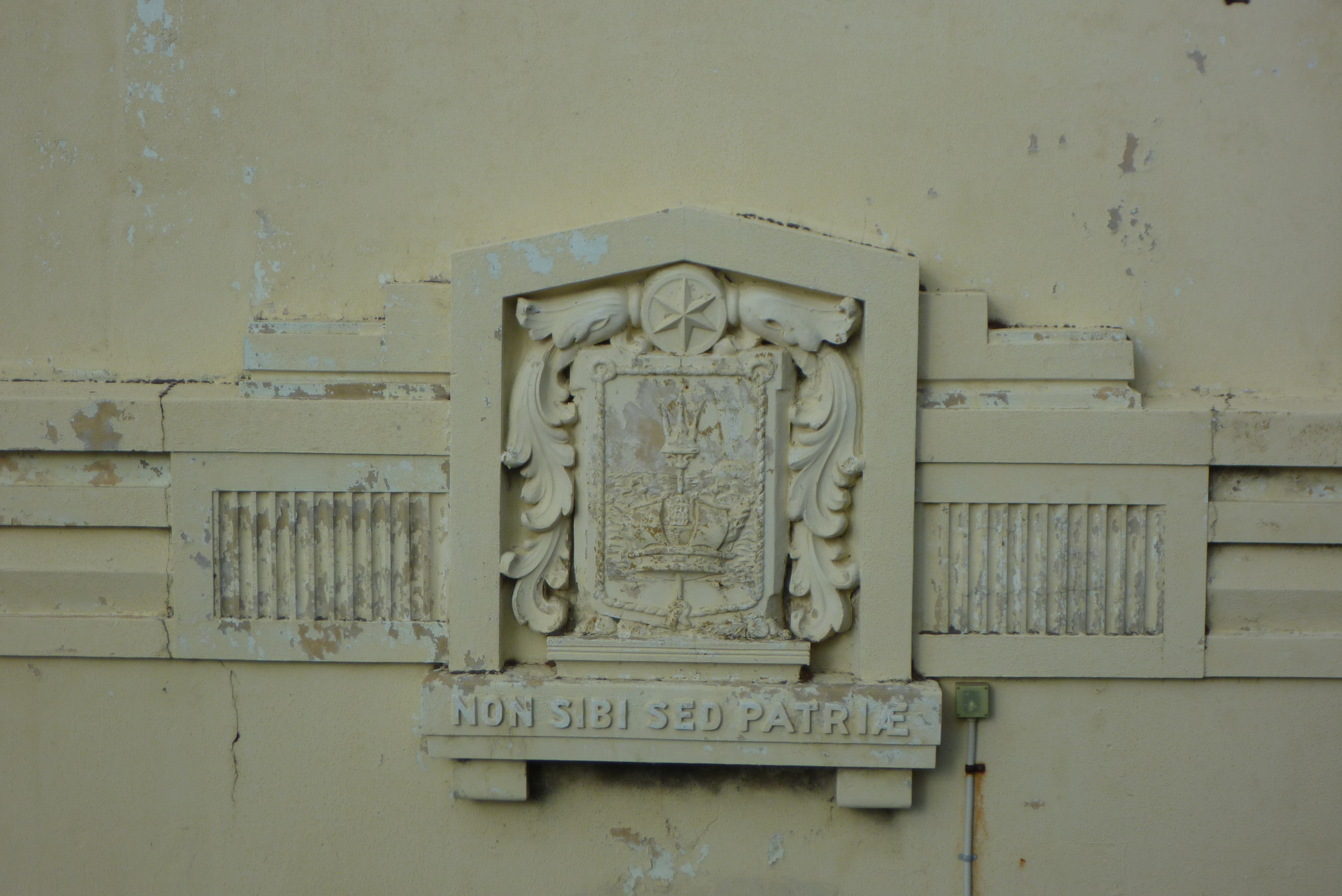
Non sibi sed patriæ in concrete relief on an old RAN warehouse in Fremantle, Western Australia

Non sibi sed patriae (or patriæ) is a Latin phrase meaning "not for self, but for country".

== United Kingdom ==
The phrase is inscribed on some war memorials, such as the First World War memorial in Newcastle upon Tyne called The Response. This was created by the Welsh artist Sir William Goscombe John in 1923 and unveiled by the Prince of Wales (later Edward VIII); it is on the grounds of the Civic Centre at Barras Bridge.

The phrase appears on a £5 commemorative coin minted in honour of the Duke of Edinburgh's 70 years of public service, issued in August 2017.

== United States ==
The phrase is used by the US Navy: it is inscribed over the chapel doors at the United States Naval Academy.

The phrase is the official motto of 3/23 Marines.

The phrase is used on the US Naval Sea Cadet Nashville LPD-13 unit crest.

The phrase is used by the 1-108th Field Artillery Regiment, the 28th Infantry Division, and the 56th Stryker Brigade Combat Team of the Pennsylvania National Guard.

The phrase is carved on the Chester Confederate Monument (1905) in Chester, South Carolina.

The phrase is the class motto for the class of 1995 from the United States Naval Academy and is featured on their class crest and engraved on their class rings.

== India ==
The phrase has also been the motto and used on the institutional logo of King Edward Memorial Hospital and Seth Gordhandas Sunderdas Medical College, parel, Mumbai, Maharashtra, India.
