= Statue of the Earl of Derby, Parliament Square =

Sculpture by Matthew Noble in London

Statue of the Earl of Derby
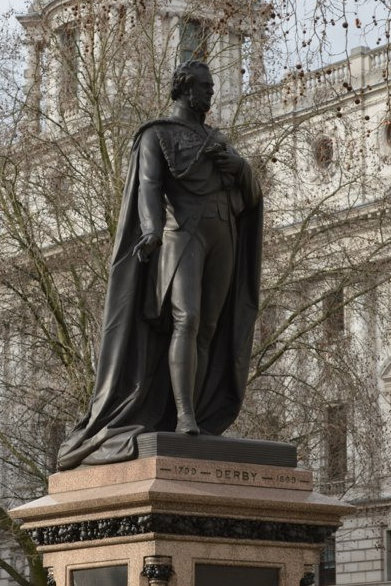
- The sculpture in 2015
- Artist: Matthew Noble
- Year: 1874
- Subject: Earl of Derby
- Designation: Grade II-listed
- Location: Parliament Square; London; 51.5008°N 0.1273°W

A sculpture of the statesman and three-time Prime Minister of the United Kingdom, Edward Smith-Stanley, 14th Earl of Derby, is located in Parliament Square, London, England. The sculptor was Matthew Noble and the Grade II-listed statue was unveiled on 11 July 1874.

The unveiling ceremony was performed by prime minister Benjamin Disraeli and those in attendance included Derby's son, Edward Stanley, 15th Earl of Derby, Charles Gordon-Lennox, 6th Duke of Richmond, Hugh Cairns, 1st Earl Cairns, Henry Liddell, 1st Earl of Ravensworth, numerous Members of Parliament and "a large number of ladies". At the conclusion of his speech, following the unveiling, Disraeli said:

We have raised this statue to him not only as a memorial, but as an example; not merely to commemorate but to inspire.

The four sides of the granite pedestal have bronze reliefs depicting Derby addressing the House of Commons during a debate on slavery, his inauguration as Chancellor of the University of Oxford, at a meeting of the Lancashire Relief Committee, and attending a Cabinet meeting.

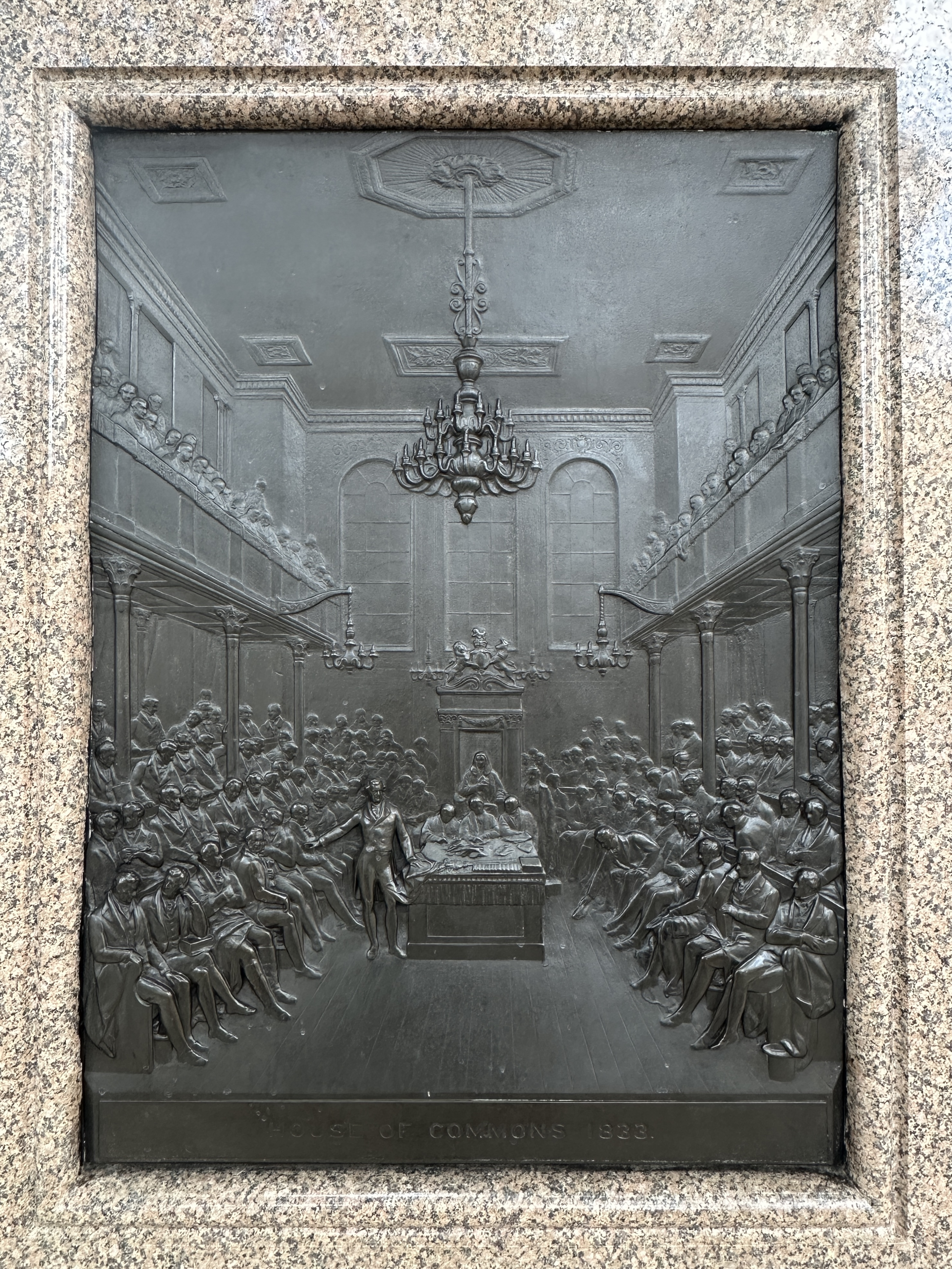
"House of Commons 1833"

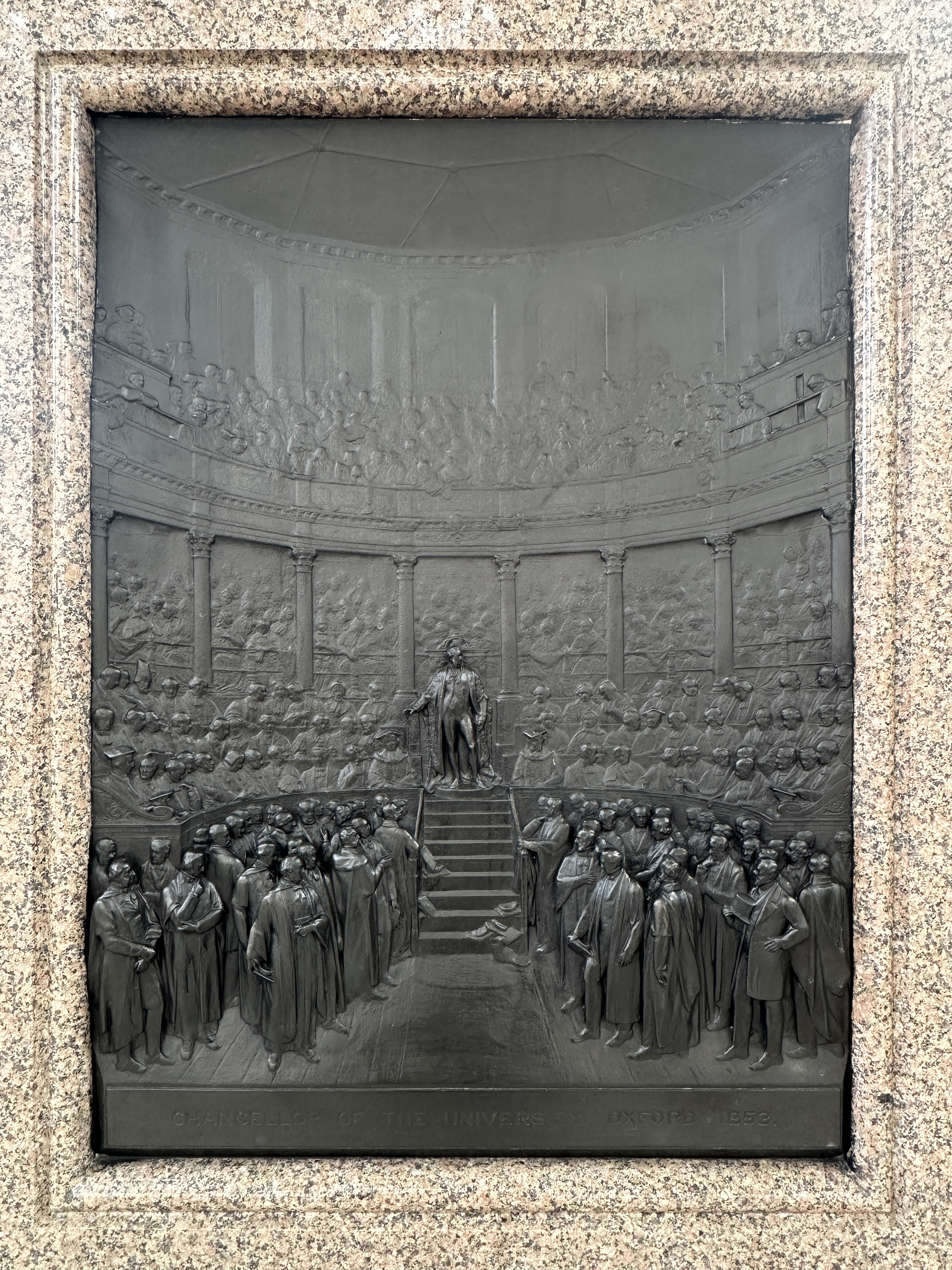
"Chancellor of the University Oxford 1853"

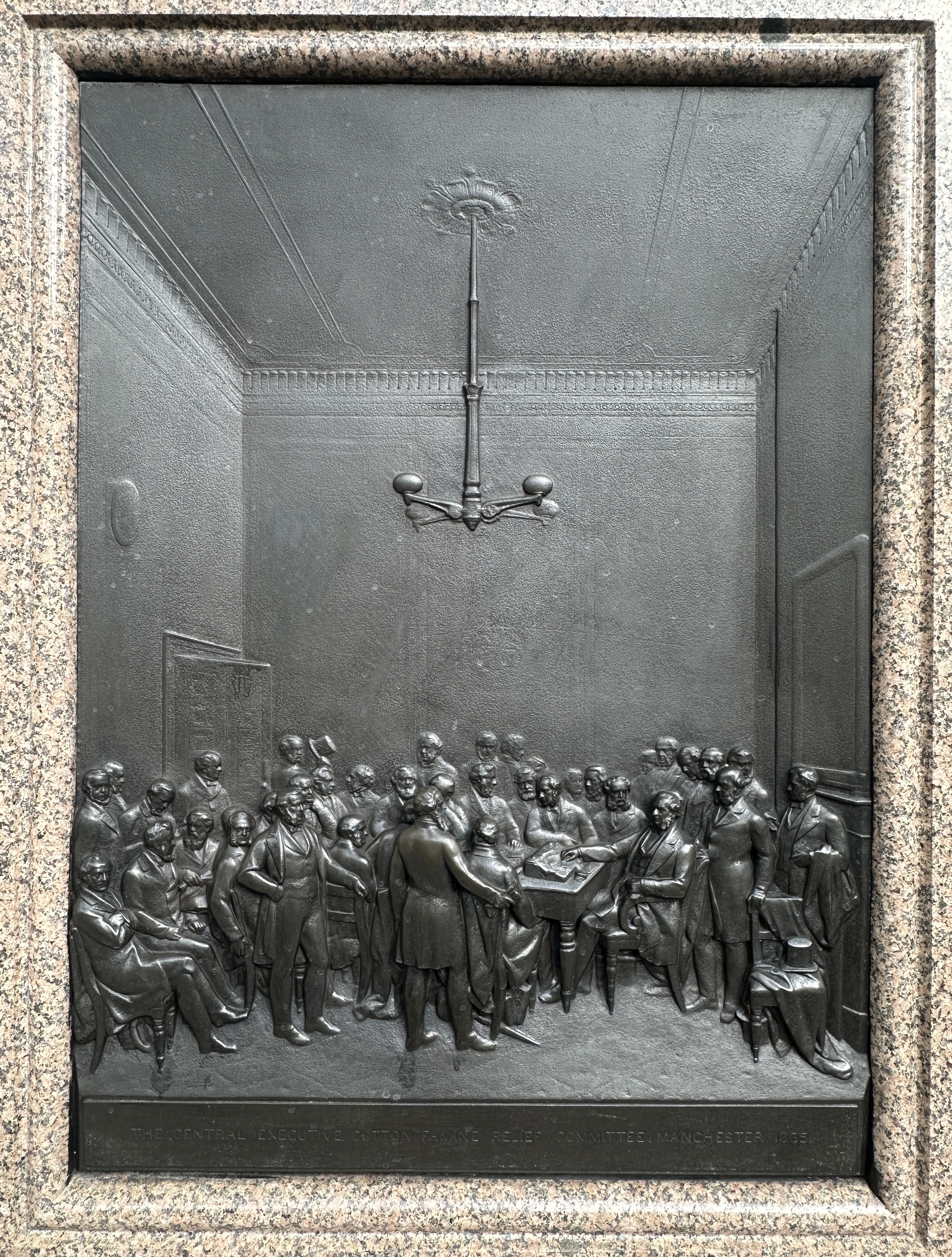
"The Central Executive Cotton Famine Relief Committee Manchester, 1865"

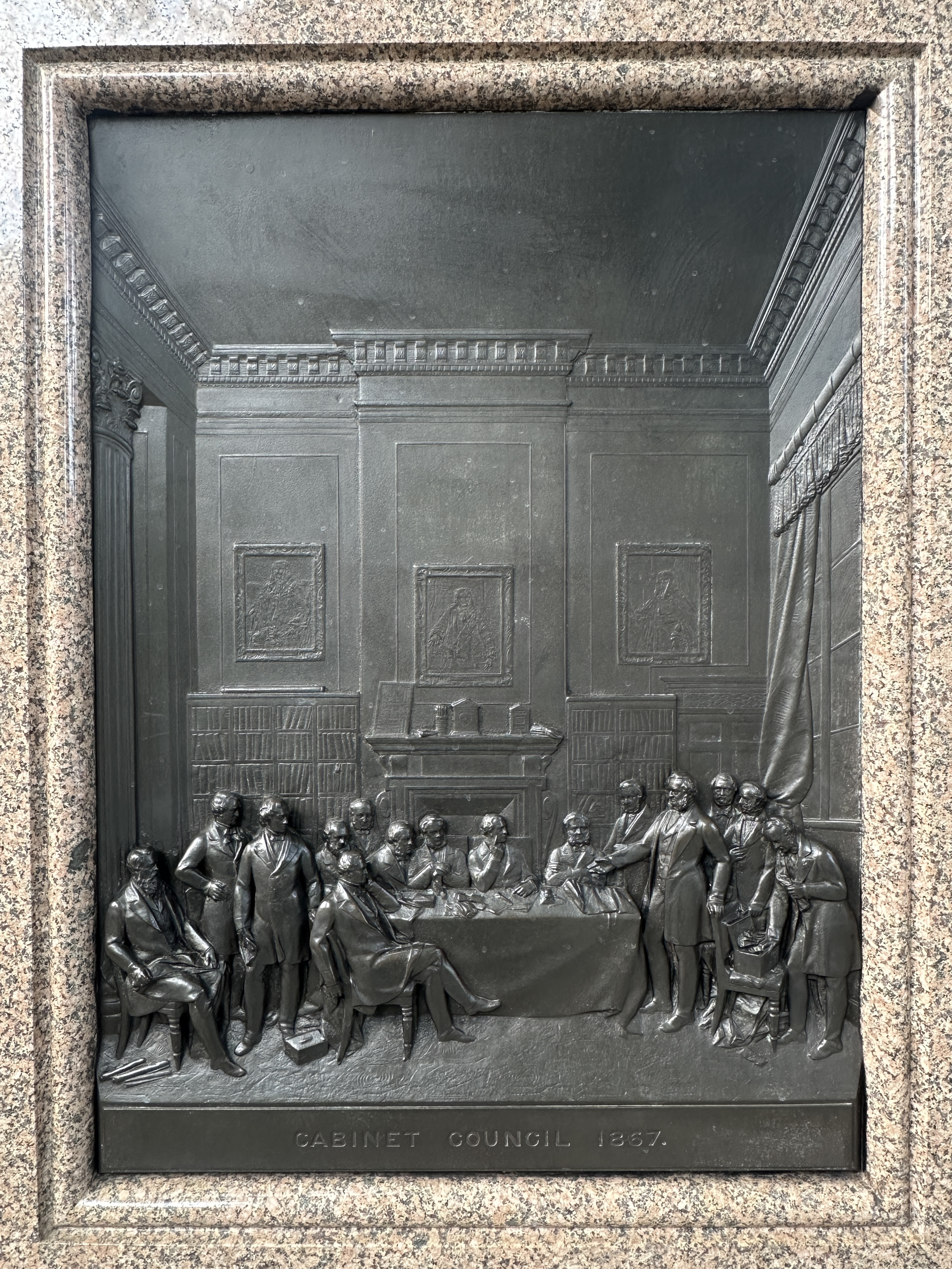
"Cabinet Council 1867"
