= Port Sunlight War Memorial =

War memorial in Wirral, Merseyside, England

Coordinates: 53.35303°N 2.99792°W

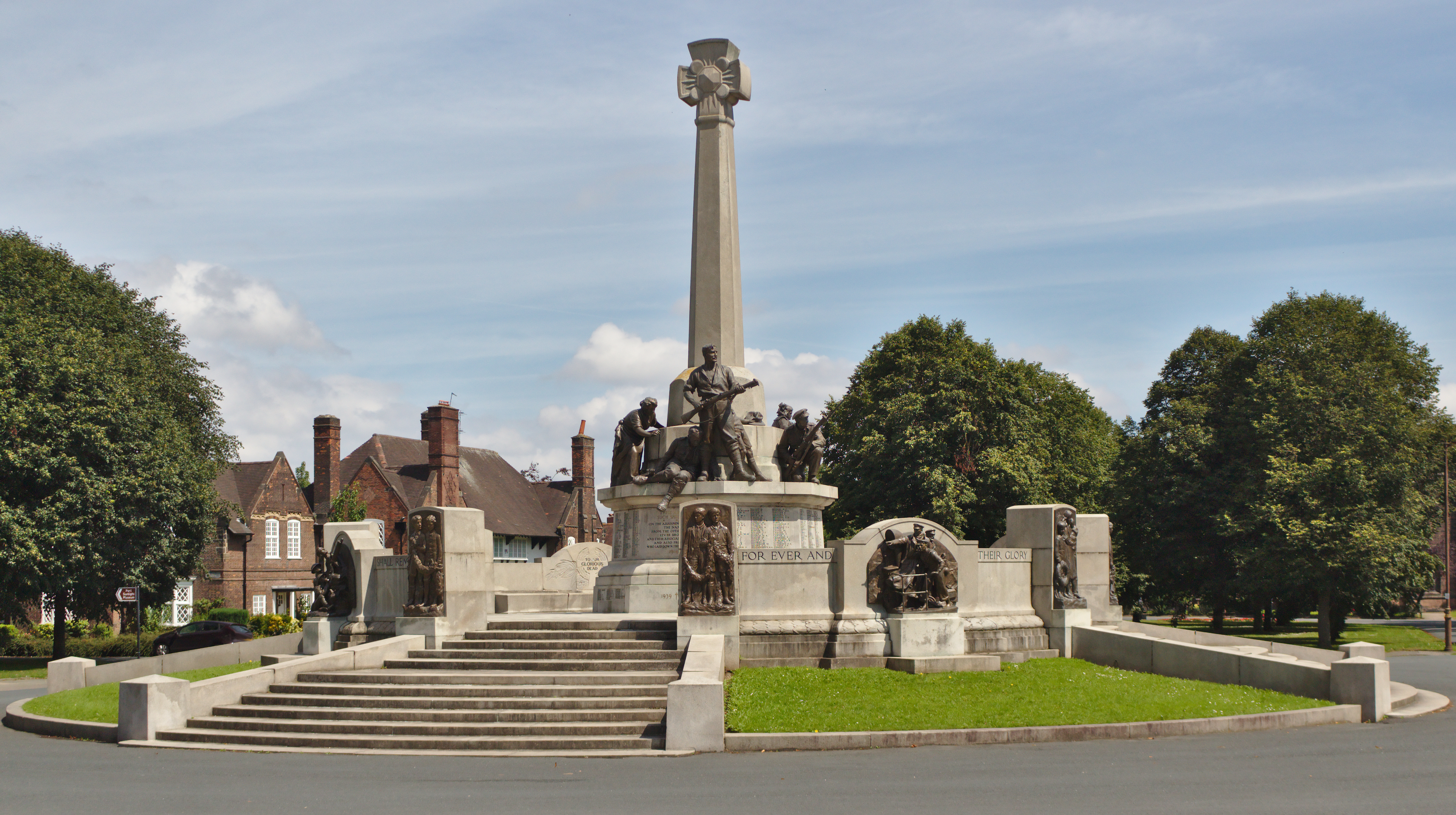
Port Sunlight War Memorial

The Port Sunlight War Memorial stands in a central position in the model village of Port Sunlight, Wirral, Merseyside, England. The founder of the village and employer of its residents, William Lever, was anxious to have a memorial to commemorate those of his workers who had been lost in the First World War. As early as 1916 he commissioned Goscombe John to design a war memorial, which was completed and unveiled in 1921 by two of his employees. It consists of a granite runic cross with bronze statues and reliefs and has the theme "Defence of the Realm". On the memorial are the names of all of the company's employees who died as a result of both World Wars. It is recorded in the National Heritage List for England as a designated Grade I listed building.

== History ==
Port Sunlight is the site of a soap factory founded by William Lever (1851–1925), later 1st Viscount Leverhulme, who also created a model village for his workers. During the First World War Lever was chairman of the Empire War Memorial League, and was anxious to have a war memorial in Port Sunlight. He was concerned that at the end of the war the best sculptors would have been engaged to work on war memorials, and as early as 1916 he commissioned Goscombe John to design a memorial for the village. Lever had been concerned that England would be invaded and at the start of the First World War, although he was then aged 63, he joined the Birkenhead and District Volunteer Training Corps (the forerunner of what would become the Home Guard in the Second World War). Consequently, the theme of the memorial was to be the "Defence of the Realm", an unusual theme for war memorials. As an invasion would threaten the people left at home, Lever was keen to invoke a sense of social cohesion, and so figures of women and children would be included in the memorial as well as military personnel.

Goscombe John exhibited some sketches and models for the memorial's figures at the 1919 and 1920 exhibitions of the Royal Academy. When the final choices were made by Lever and members of his local committee they were cast at the foundry of A. B. Burton at Thames Ditton, and the memorial was built by William Kirkpatrick Limited of Manchester. Over 4,000 of Lever's employees had served in the war and, of these, 503 had been killed. Initially it had been planned that the names of all those who had served would be incorporated in the memorial, but this was impractical, and only the names of those killed were included. The memorial was unveiled on 3 December 1921. It was decided that the ceremony should be carried out, not by an eminent personality, but by employees who had served. A ballot of all the Lever ex-servicemen was held, and those chosen were Sergeant Eames, who had been blinded at the battle of the Somme, and Private Robert Cruickshank who had been awarded the Victoria Cross for his actions in Palestine. A Pathe Newsreel recording this event can be viewed on YouTube http://www.britishpathe.com/video/blind-hero-unveils-memorial/query/William

== Description ==
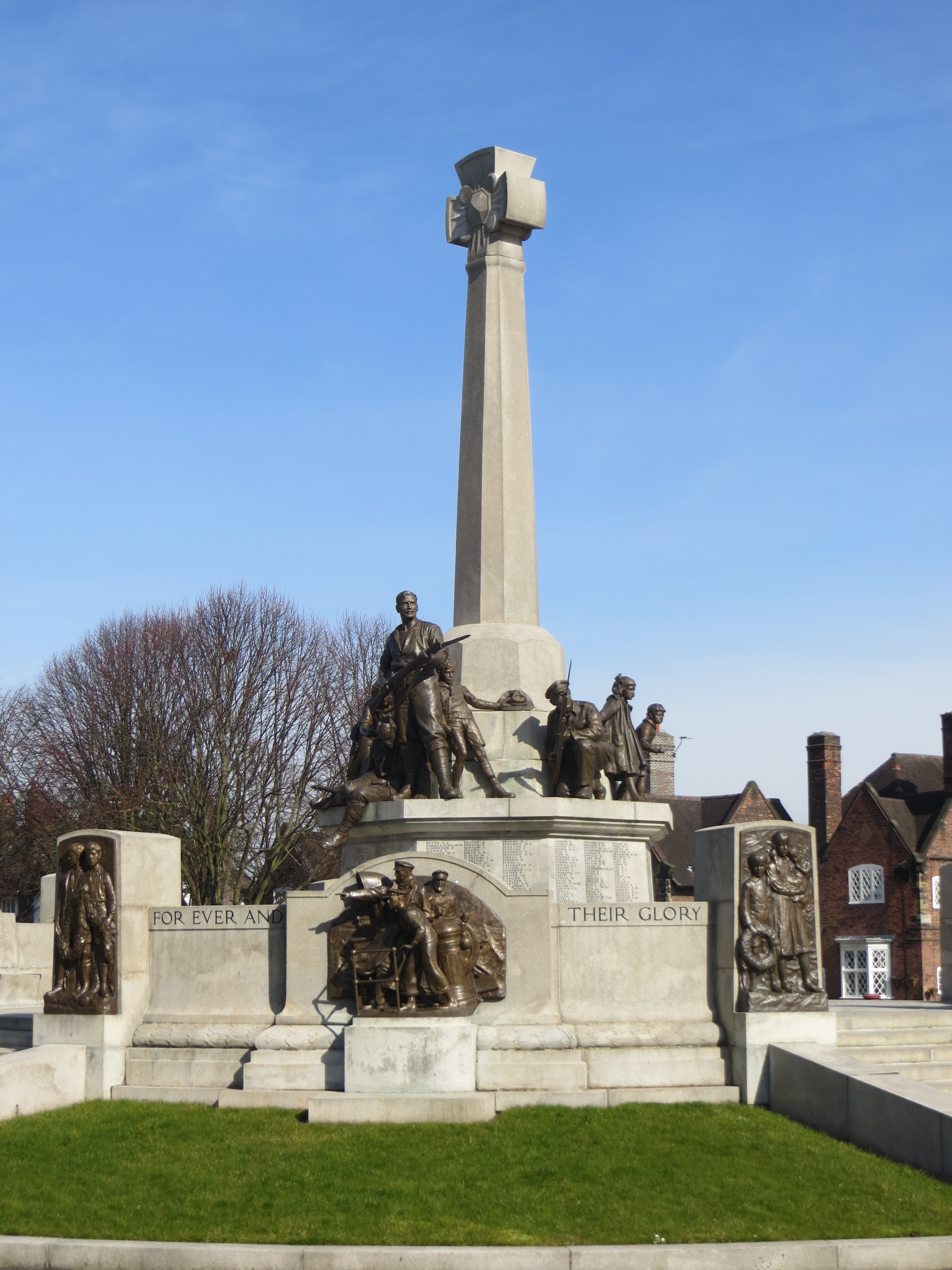
Figures on the plinth

The memorial stands in the most prominent position in the centre of the village, at the intersection of its broadest avenues, The Causeway and The Diamond. It is made in granite, with sculptures and reliefs in bronze. At the centre is a runic cross. This stands on an octagonal plinth, on which are the statues of eleven figures. There are inscriptions on the sides of the plinth. Around the plinth is an enclosure with four seating areas, and it is surrounded by a circular parapet. The parapet is broken by four flights of steps. Flanking the tops of the steps are reliefs of groups of children holding wreathes; all the reliefs are different. On each of the four sections of the parapet facing the road is a relief depicting an aspect of the services. Between the flights of steps are flower beds. The monument is about 11.6 metres (38 ft) high, and overall has a diameter of about 22.4 metres (73 ft). The reliefs of children are about 161 centimetres (5.3 ft) high and those depicting the services are about 128 centimetres (4.2 ft) high.

The figures on the plinth depict three soldiers, one of whom is wounded and is being attended by a nurse; a seated woman cradling a group of infants; a girl with her brother; and a Boy Scout. These figures are all larger than life size. The reliefs on the parapet depict respectively the Naval, the Military, the Anti-Aircraft and the Red Cross Services.

On the front of the plinth are two inscriptions. The one at the top reads:

THE MEMORIAL
ERECTED BY LEVER BROTHERS LIMITED
AND THE COMPANY'S EMPLOYEES IN ALL
PARTS OF THE BRITISH EMPIRE AND IN
ALLIED COUNTRIES WAS UNVEILED ON
DECEMBER 3RD 1921 BY
SERGEANT E.G. EAMES OF PORT SUNLIGHT
WHO LOST HIS SIGHT AT THE FIRST BATTLE
OF THE SOMME IN FRANCE 1916 AND BY
PRIVATE R.E. CRUISHANK OF THE LONDON
BRANCH OFFICE WHO WAS AWARDED THE
VICTORIA CROSS IN 1918 FOR CONSPICUOUS
BRAVERY AND DEVOTION TO DUTY IN PALESTINE.

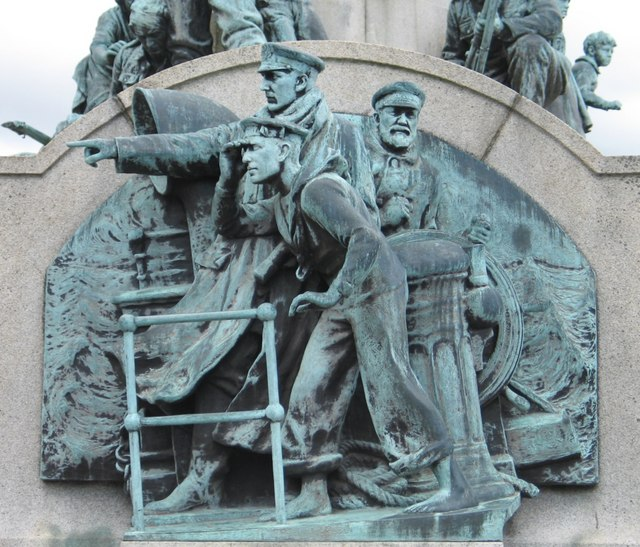
Relief depicting the Naval Service

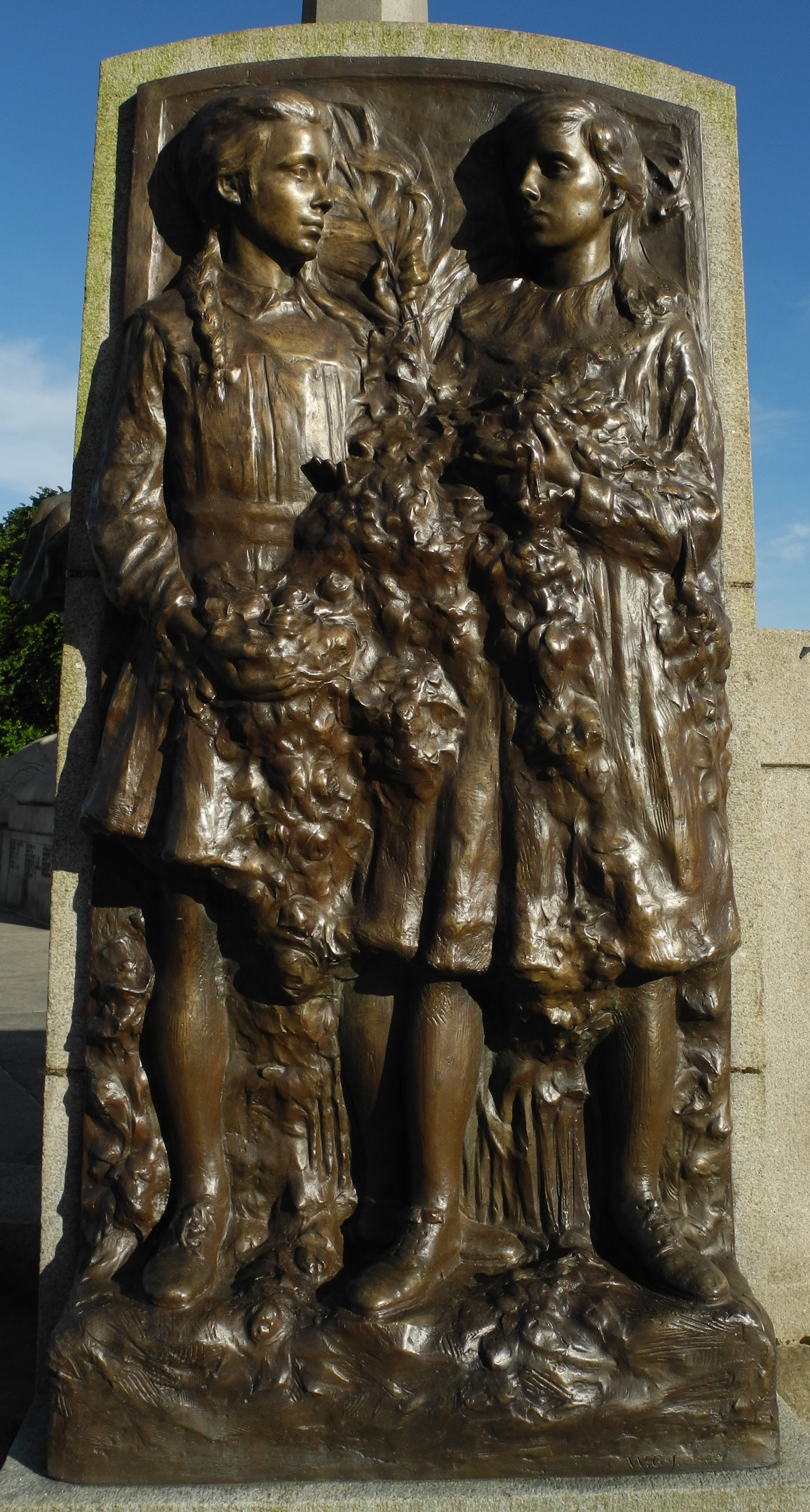
One of the reliefs depicting children with wreaths

and at the bottom the inscription reads:

THE NAMES OF ALL THOSE WHO SERVED NUMBERING OVER FOUR
THOUSAND ARE RECORDED IN A BOOK DEPOSITED BENEATH
THIS STONE AND ALSO IN SIMILAR BOOKS PLACED IN
CHRIST CHURCH AND IN THE LADY LEVER ART GALLERY.

On the back of the plinth, at the top is the inscription:

THESE ARE NOT DEAD
SUCH SPIRITS NEVER DIE.
ON THE ADJOINING PANELS ARE INSCRIBED
THE NAMES OF THOSE
FROM THE OFFICES AND WORKS OF
LEVER BROTHERS LIMITED
AND THEIR ASSOCIATED COMPANIES OVERSEAS
AND ALSO FROM PORT SUNLIGHT
WHO LAID DOWN THEIR LIVES IN THE GREAT WAR
1914-1919.

and on the lower part of the plinth are the dates 1939–1945.

Around the outside of the parapet is carved the following:

DULCE ET DECORUM
EST PRO PATRIA MORI (Note: This is a quotation from the Odes of Horace that translates "To die for the fatherland is sweet and becoming".)
THEIR NAME
SHALL REMAIN
FOR EVER AND
THEIR GLORY
SHALL NOT BE
BLOTTED OUT. (Note: This is adapted from Ecclesiasticus, chapter 44, verse 13.)

and on the back of each of the four seats is inscribed "TO OUR GLORIOUS DEAD".

On all the other sides of the plinth are the names of those who were lost in both world wars.

== Appraisal ==
The memorial was designated as a Grade II listed building on 20 December 1965. The designation was raised to Grade I on 28 October 2014. Grade I is the highest of the three grades of listing and is applied to "buildings of exceptional interest, sometimes considered to be internationally important". When the models were shown at the Royal Academy exhibitions, it was their realism that most impressed the critics. But it was not to everyone's liking. Some critics thought that they were too real in appearance for their intended surroundings. And they were not to the taste of the company's architect, James Lomax-Simpson who thought the composition was too complicated, and would have preferred something "more straightforward, more symbolical and monumental". The architectural historian Nikolaus Pevsner considered that it is a memorial that is "genuinely moving and which avoids sentimentality". Hartwell et al. in the Buildings of England series say "It is deeply moving".

== See also ==
- Grade I listed buildings in Merseyside
- Grade I listed war memorials in England
- Listed buildings in Port Sunlight
