= Goscombe John =

Welsh sculptor (1860–1952)

Sir Goscombe John RA
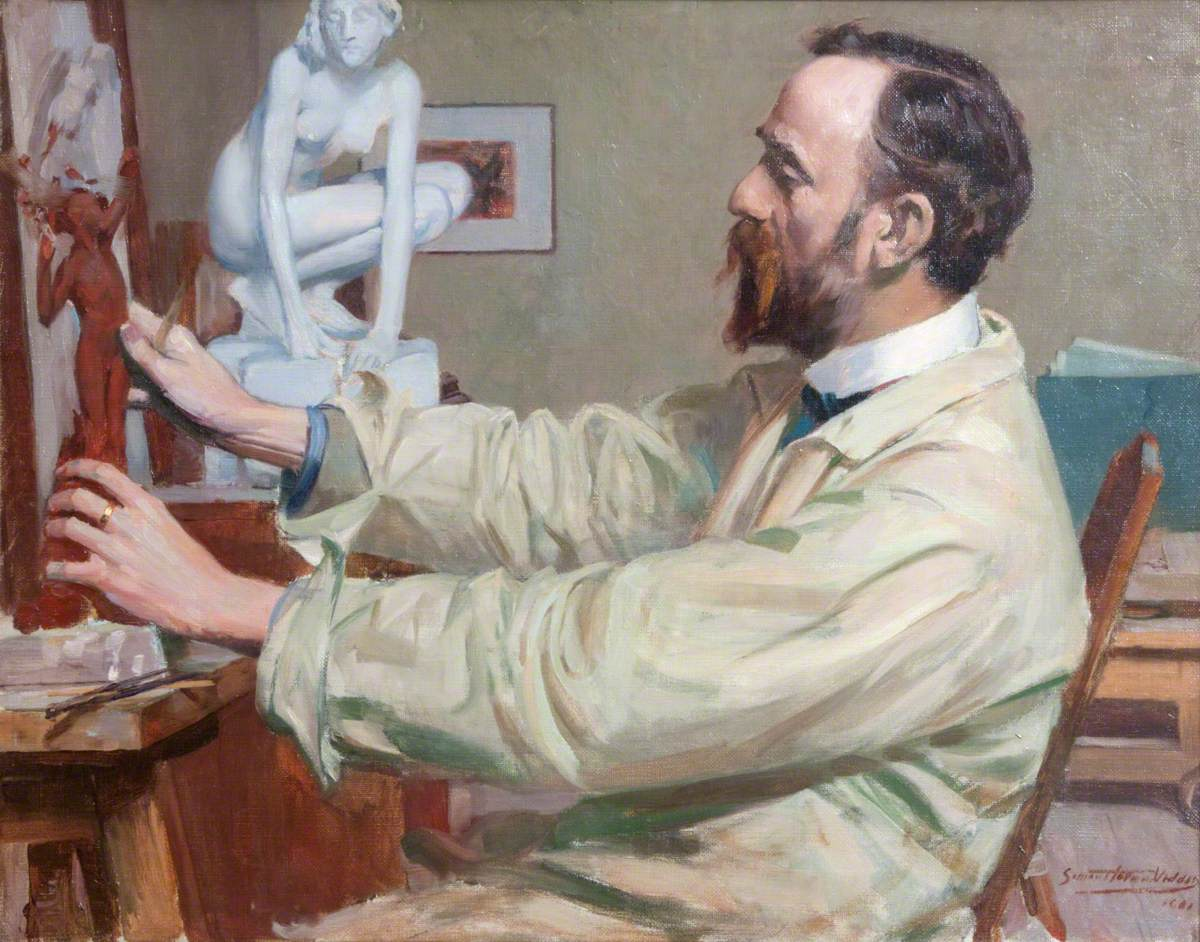
- Portrait by Simon Hermon Vedder, 1901
- Born: 21 February 1860; Cardiff, Wales
- Died: 15 December 1952 (aged 92); London, England
- Education: Cardiff School of Art; South London School of Technical Art; Royal Academy Schools
- Known for: Sculpture
- Movement: New Sculpture
- Spouse: Martha Weiss (m. 1891; died 1923)
- Awards: Knight Bachelor (1911)

Sir William Goscombe John RA (21 February 1860 – 15 December 1952) was a Welsh sculptor known for his many public memorials. As a sculptor, John developed a distinctive style of his own while respecting classical traditions and forms of sculpture. He gained national attention with statues of eminent Victorians in London and Cardiff and subsequently, after both the Second Boer War and World War I, created a large number of war memorials. These included the two large group works, The Response 1914 in Newcastle upon Tyne and the Port Sunlight War Memorial which are considered the finest sculptural ensembles on any British monument. Although as a young man he adopted the first name Goscombe, taken from the name of a village in Gloucestershire near his mother's home, he was actively engaged with his native Wales and Welsh culture throughout his career.

== Biography ==
=== Early life and career ===
John was born in the Canton area of Cardiff, the eldest son of Thomas John, a wood carver from Llantrithyd and Elizabeth (née Smith), from Randwick, Gloucestershire.

As a youth John assisted his father in the restoration of Cardiff Castle and Castell Coch during 1874 which was being overseen by William Burges. He initially studied in his home town, attending the Cardiff School of Art throughout the 1870s and also took anatomy classes from a local painter.

John moved to London in 1881 and worked as a pupil-assistant in the studio of Thomas Nicholls, Burges' architectural carver. John then studied at the South London School of Technical Art under Jules Dalou and William Silver Frith and then at the Royal Academy Schools, where he won the gold medal and a travelling scholarship in 1887. Throughout 1890 and 1891 he travelled in Europe and Africa and, in 1891, took a studio in Paris where he studied with Auguste Rodin. John's statuette, Morpheus clearly reflected the influence of Rodin on his development and the piece received an honourable mention when shown at the Paris Salon in 1892. Following the success of Morpheus, John created a series of exhibition pieces that embraced the naturalistic style of the New Sculpture movement and cemented his reputation. John the Baptist, 1894, a life-sized figure cast in block tin for Lord Bute won a gold medal at the 1900 Paris Exhibition.

Other notable works from this period included Girl Binding her Hair, 1893, The Elf, 1898 and A Boy at Play, 1895. A Boy at Play was subsequently purchased by the Chantrey Bequest for the Tate. The Elf was highly praised when shown at the Royal Academy in 1898 and was subsequently reproduced both in bronze and marble to become among John's most popular works. John received gold medals from the Paris Salon in 1892 and, for his statue of the Duke of Devonshire, in 1901.

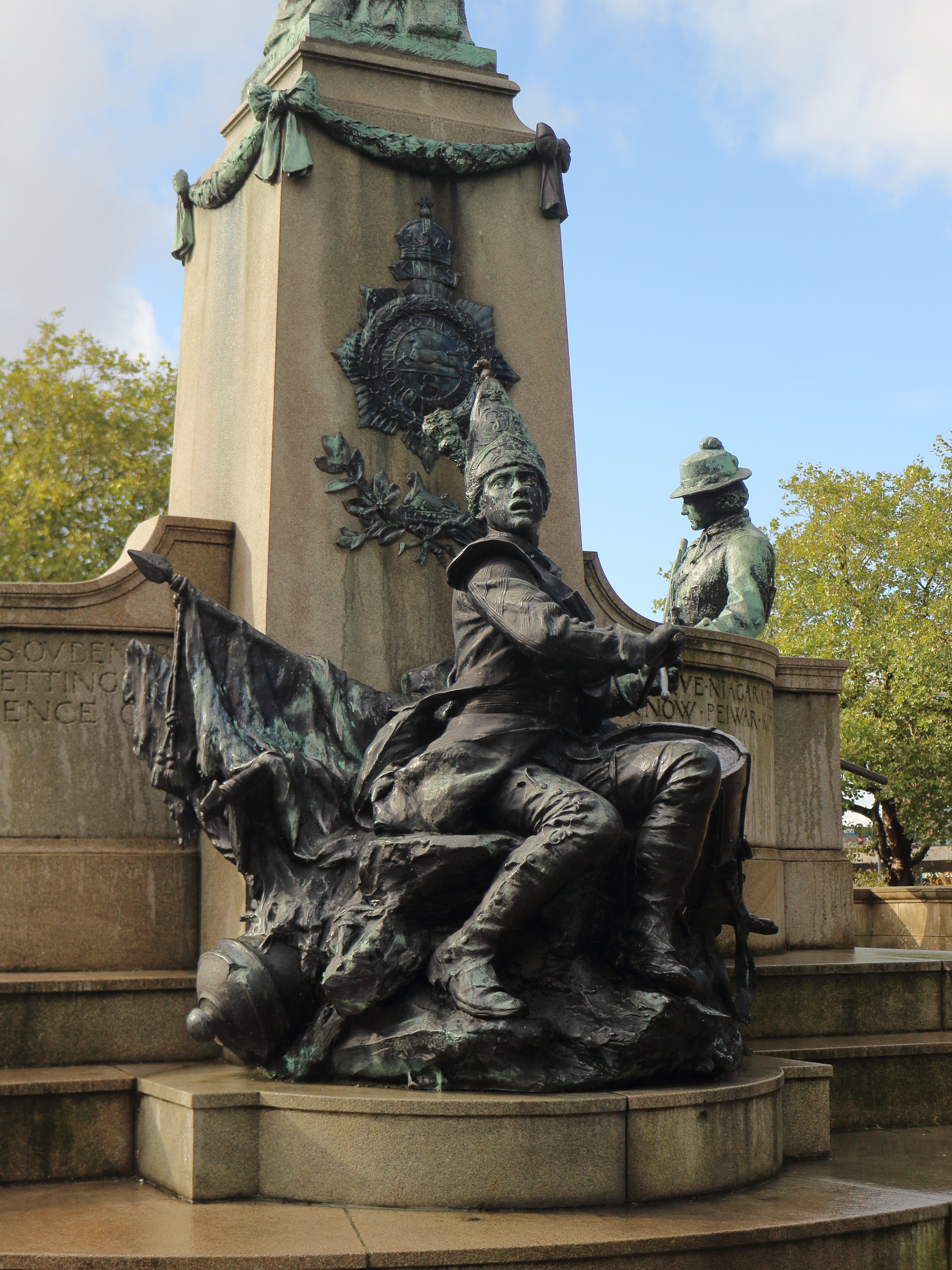
Drummer Boy statue, reverse of the King's Regiment memorial, Liverpool

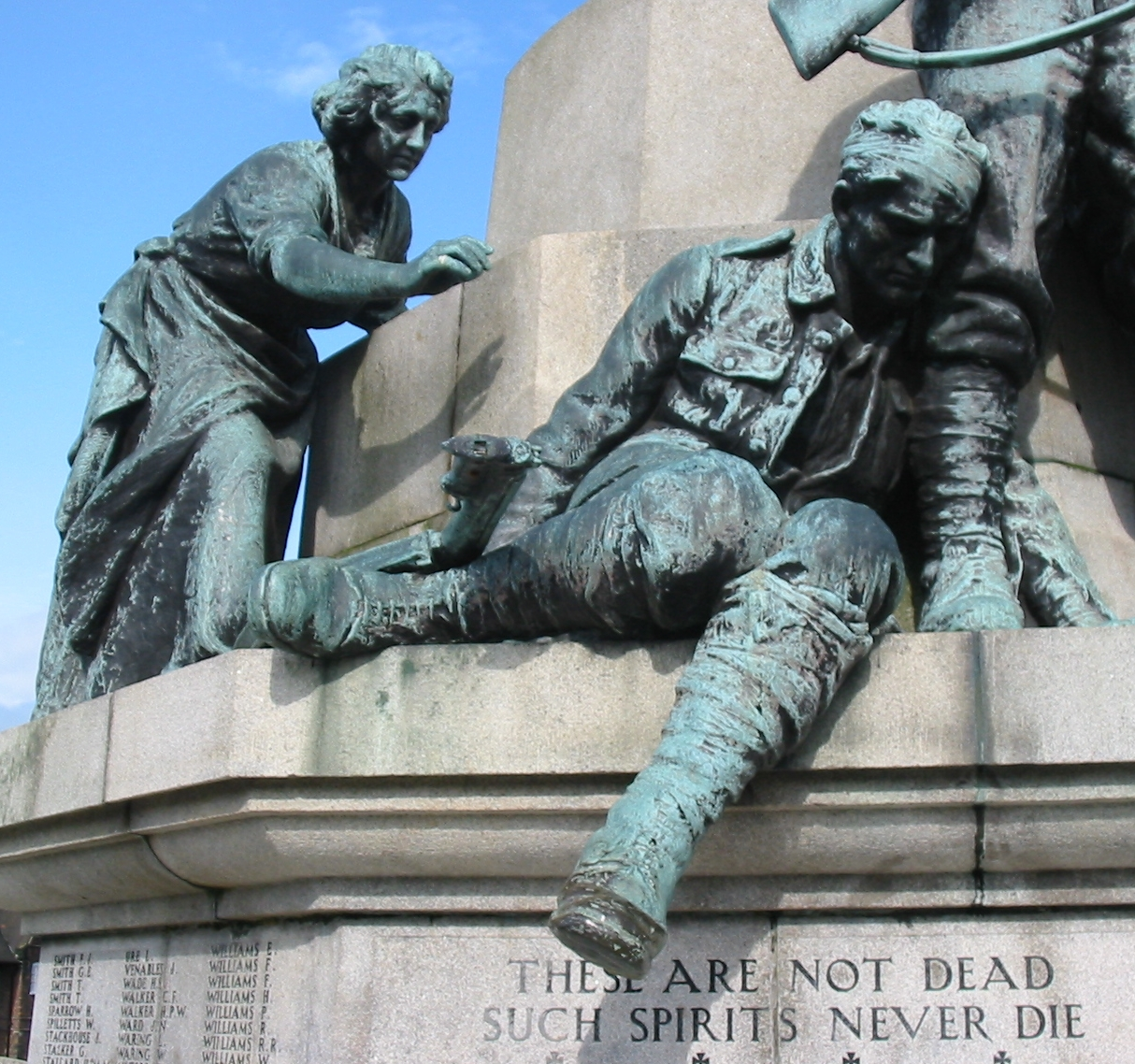
Detail of the Port Sunlight war memorial

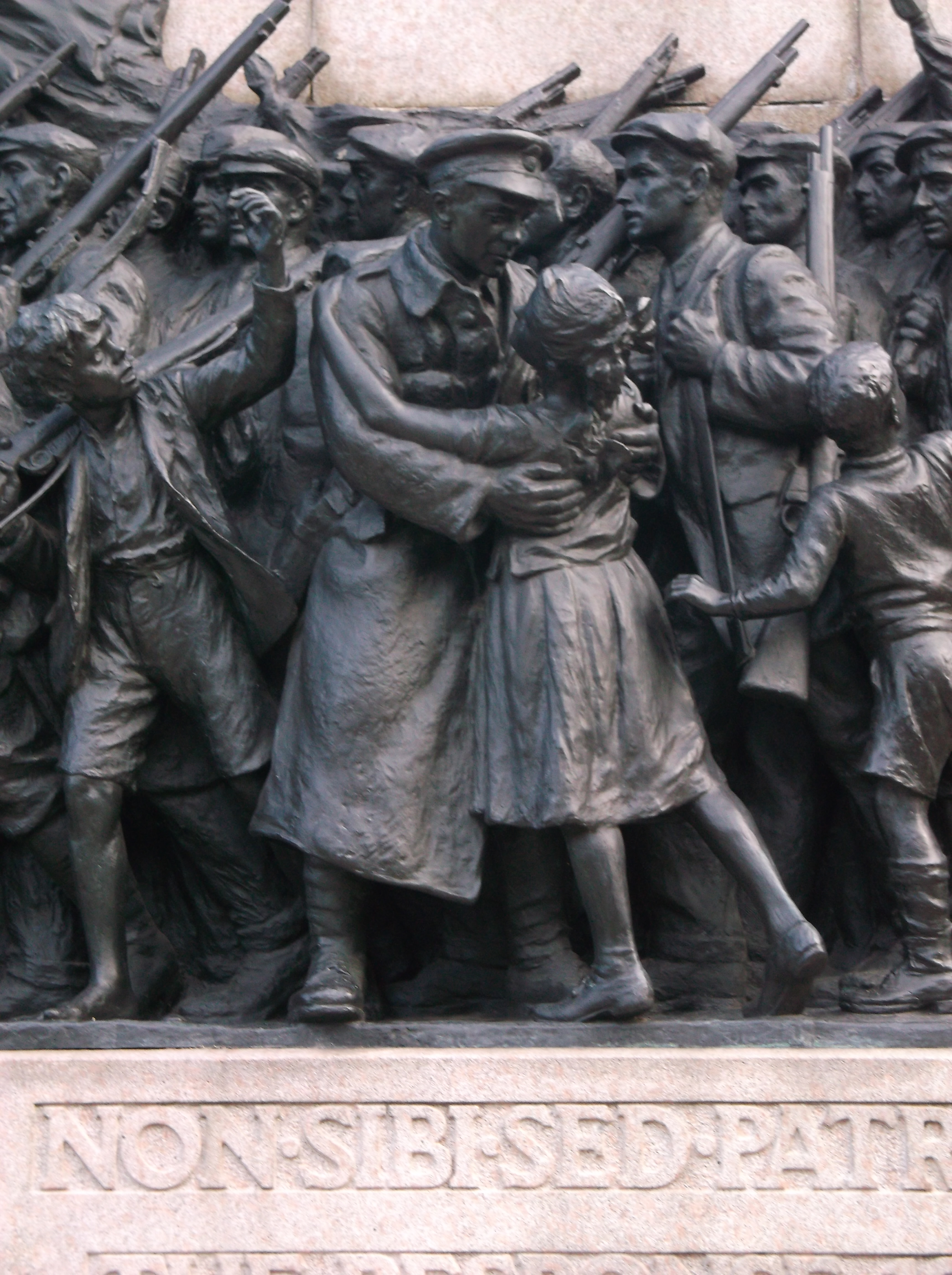
Detail of The Response 1914, Newcastle upon Tyne

=== Major works ===
By the early 1900s John had established himself as a sculptor of some note and began to receive significant public commissions. Although based in London, John won a number of large commissions in his native Wales. He designed the Hirlas Horn for the 1898 National Eisteddfod of Wales and a set of ceremonial tools to mark the building of the National Museum Wales in Cardiff. For the monument, unveiled in 1899 and known as The Girl, to Welsh poets and preachers at Llansannan, John depicted a girl in modern clothing wrapped in a traditional Welsh cloak. The creation of that monument had been promoted by the Welsh nationalist Thomas Edward Ellis and when he died, also in 1899, John was selected to sculpt his memorial statue which was unveiled at Bala in 1903 by David Lloyd George. John's statue of the shipping magnate and philanthropist John Cory was erected in Cathays Park in the centre of Cardiff and is one of several statues by him in, or near, the park. These include the 1906 bronze statue of Lord Tredegar which was John's first equestrian statue. His 1916 marble St David Blessing the People is also nearby in the Marble Hall of Cardiff City Hall.

John received a further number of national and international commissions, including several for war memorials. John's 1905 King's Regiment Boer War memorial in St John's Gardens, Liverpool depicts two soldiers of the regiment from different historical periods, one from the 17th century and one from the Boer War period, around a figure of Britannia on a pedestal. John created a similar representation of a regiment's heroic traditions for the 1924 Royal Welch Fusiliers memorial at Wrexham which features statues of 18th and 20th century soldiers. On the reverse of the Liverpool monument is a sculpture featuring a regimental drummer boy of 1743. This was subsequently cast as a separate, small bronze in an edition for the retail market and became a popular purchase while a monumental version was also cast and is held by the National Museum Wales.

Before the outbreak of the First World War, John had been commissioned to create a memorial to the 244 engineers who had died with the sinking of the RMS Titanic in 1912. When the monument was completed in 1916, and erected in Liverpool, it was dedicated to all engineers and engine room workers lost at sea, including those killed during the ongoing First World War.

John was commissioned by Lord Leverhulme to design a memorial at Port Sunlight to the 500 plus employees of Lever Brothers Ltd who had died in the First World War. John exhibited a variety of sketches and maquettes for the memorial at the Royal Academy in 1919 and 1920 but left the final selection of figures to Leverhulme. The monument consists of a cross on an octagonal base on an elevated podium. There are large bronze sculptural groups with a total of 11 figures and 12 relief panels on the podium. The main sculpture group shows three soldiers, one shielding a child and one lying wounded with a figure of a nurse approaching him. The sculptural group on the rear of the podium consists of a mother figure with infants and other children. The relief panels on the podium sides show pairs of children carrying wreaths plus panels showing combat scenes including machine gunners in a trench and action stations on the bridge of a warship. The monument was greatly praised for its depiction of military and civilian roles, Nicholas Pevsner described the monument as "genuinely moving and avoids sentimentality".

The Port Sunlight memorial was unveiled in 1921, two years before John's Northumberland Fusiliers Memorial was erected in Newcastle upon Tyne. Known as "The Response 1914" the monument was commissioned to mark the raising of four battalions of volunteers by the local Chamber of Commerce at the start of World War I. In bronze, John created a procession of deep-relief figures representing the volunteers and those they were leaving behind. The procession is led a winged angel, an allegory of renown, blowing a horn above two drummer boys followed by uniformed soldiers and men in civilian clothes, some of whom are saying goodbye to women and children. Although created several years after the end of the war, the monument illustrates the mood of patriotic confidence and resolve that had marked a period at the start of the conflict ten years earlier and makes the work deeply poignant. Writing in 1991, Alan Borg, a former director of the Imperial War Museum described the Port Sunlight and Newcastle memorials as the finest sculptural ensembles on any British monument.

=== Personal life ===
John was made a Royal Academician in 1909 and became a corresponding member of the Institut de France. He first exhibited at the Royal Academy in London in 1886 and continued to do so annually until 1948. In 1942 he was awarded the gold medal of the Royal Society of Sculptors. He was knighted at Caernarfon Castle in 1911 during the investiture of Edward VIII as the Prince of Wales for which he designed elements of the regalia and a medal. John was influential in the development of the National Museum of Wales, having served on its governing council for over forty years and donated numerous art works to the Museum.

In August 1890, John married the Swiss-born Marthe Weiss. Their daughter Muriel married Luke Val Fildes in 1915, the son of the artist Sir Luke Fildes. From 1892 John lived at Greville Road, Kilburn, London (in a house that had previously belonged to Seymour Lucas), and is buried in Hampstead Cemetery. The memorial statue of his wife, which he designed when she died in 1923, was stolen from the cemetery in 2001 and recovered after a few months; it was then put into storage, but was stolen again in 2007.

== Public monuments and memorials ==
=== 1890–1899 ===
Image	Title / subject	Location and coordinates	Date	Type	Material	Dimensions	Designation	Wikidata	Notes
	Memorial to W.R.H Powell	Llanboidy, Carmarthenshire	1891	Statue	White marble		Grade II*	Q17742263	
	Age	Lady Lever Art Gallery	1892	Bust					Subject is Clara Weiss, the artist's mother-in-law
More images	A Boy at Play	Tate Britain, London	c. 1895	Statue on base	Bronze & stone				
More images	Daniel Owen	Mold, Flintshire	c.1896, repositioned 1976	Statue on pedestal	Bronze & stone		Grade II	Q29480968	
More images	The Elf	Kibble Palace, Botanic Gardens, Glasgow	1899	Statue on plinth	Marble	2.25m high		Q84322910	One of several versions in different materials
More images	The Girl Tudur Aled William Salesbury Henry Rees William Rees (Gwilym Hiraethog) Edward Roberts (Iorwerth Glan Aled)	Llansannan, Conwy	1899	Statue on obelisk & plinth	Bronze & stone		Grade II	Q29499309	Monument to Welsh poets and preachers.
More images	Joyance	Thompson's Park, Cardiff	1899	Statue	Bronze			Q47494806	Also at St Fagans National Museum of History

=== 1900–1909 ===
Image	Title / subject	Location and coordinates	Date	Type	Material	Dimensions	Designation	Wikidata	Notes
	Tomb of Dean Charles Vaughan	North choir-aisle of Llandaff Cathedral	1900	Tomb with sculpture	Marble				
More images	William Cavendish, 7th Duke of Devonshire	Devonshire Place, Eastbourne	1901	Statue on plinth	Bronze & stone		Grade II	Q26295681	
More images	Memorial to Arthur Sullivan	Victoria Embankment Gardens, London	1902	Bust and figure on pedestal	Bronze & granite		Grade II	Q27081637	
More images	Memorial to Arthur Sullivan	St Paul's Cathedral, London	1902	Relief plaque	Bronze				
More images	Alfred Thomas, 1st Baron Pontypridd	National Museum Cardiff	1902	Bust	Marble				
	Wigan and District Boer War memorial	Mesnes Park, Wigan	1903	Sculpture on plinth	Stone with bronze additions				Removed after repeated vandalism.
More images	James Reid (1823–1894)	Springburn Park, Glasgow	1903	Statue on pedestal	Bronze & granite		Category B	Q17811051	
More images	Prince Christian Victor of Schleswig-Holstein	Thames Street, Windsor, Berkshire	1903	Statue and surround	Bronze & Portland stone		Grade II	Q26411185	
More images	Thomas Edward Ellis	Bala, Gwynedd	1903	Statue on plinth with panels	Bronze & sandstone	c. 4.5m high	Grade II	Q29502898	A full-size copy is at the Old College, Aberystwyth
	Coldstream Guards Boer War memorial	Vestibule of south nave, St Paul's Cathedral, London	1904	Plaque in deep relief	Gilt bronze & stone	1.5m x 0.9m			
More images	RAMC Boer War Memorial	Gun Hill, Aldershot	1905	Sculpture group, obelisk and wall with plaques	Bronze & granite		Grade II	Q26672950	Architect, Robert Weir Schultz
More images	Memorial to Alfred W. Hughes	Corris, Gwynedd	1905	Celtic cross on pedestal with a bronze plaque	Granite		Grade II	Q2949920	
More images	The King's Regiment memorial	St John's Gardens, Liverpool	1905	4 statues with base, pedestal & wall	Bronze & stone		Grade II	Q26333154	AB Burton (foundry); William Kirkpatrick Ltd (builders)
	Journalists of the South African War memorial	Crypt of St. Faith, St Paul's Cathedral, London	1905	Relief plaque with surround	Bronze and red limestone				
More images	Edward VII	Grand Parade, Cape Town, South Africa	1905	Statue on pedestal and steps	Marble & granite	9m tall		Q19623378	
More images	Bokani	National Museum Cardiff	1905	Bust	Bronze	35cm			
More images	John Cory	Gorsedd Gardens, Cathays Park, Cardiff	1906	Statue on pedestal	Bronze & stone		Grade II	Q29491668	
More images	John Cory	National Museum Cardiff	1906	Bust	Marble	70.0cm			
More images	Judge Gwilym Williams of Miskin (1839–1906)	Opposite Crown Court, Cathays Park, Cardiff	1906	Statue on plinth	Bronze & stone		Grade II	Q29491700	
More images	Memorial to 2nd Battn Royal Sussex Regiment, 1882 to 1902	Grand Parade, Eastbourne	1906	Statue on pedestal	Bronze & stone		Grade II*	Q17555428	AB Burton (foundry)
	John Viriamu Jones	Entrance hall, Main Building of Cardiff University, Cathays Park	1906	Statue on pedestal	Marble				
More images	William Edward Hartpole Lecky	Trinity College, Dublin	1906	Statue on pedestal	Bronze & stone			Q82094233	
More images	Bishop Richard Lewis	Llandaff Cathedral, Cardiff	1908	Wall-mounted statue with plaque	Bronze				
More images	Godfrey Morgan, 1st Viscount Tredegar	Gorsedd Gardens, Cathays Park, Cardiff	1909	Equestrian statue on pedestal with reliefs	Bronze & stone		Grade II	Q29491649	
More images	Robert Gascoyne-Cecil, 3rd Marquess of Salisbury	Westminster Abbey, London	1909	Altar & effigy	Black marble & bronze				
More images	Godfrey Morgan, 1st Viscount Tredegar	Newport Museum and Art Gallery	1909	Bust on pedestal	Marble				

=== 1910–1919 ===
Image	Title / subject	Location and coordinates	Date	Type	Material	Dimensions	Designation	Wikidata	Notes
	Sir James Fergusson, 6th Baronet	Wellington Square, Ayr	1910	Statue on pedestal	Bronze & stone		Category B	Q17838501	
More images	Edward James Saunderson	Portadown, County Armagh	1910	Statue on pedestal	Bronze & stone				
	The Boy Scout	National Museum Cardiff	1910	Statuette	Bronze				Portrait of Basil Webb, son of Henry Webb, and who served as a 2nd lieutenant with the Welsh Guards during the First World War and was killed in December 1917.
	Lewis Edwards memorial	Pen-llwyn, Ceredigion	1911	Bust on pedestal	Bronze & granite		Grade II	Q29501128	
More images	Statue of Charles Rolls	Agincourt Square, Monmouth	1911	Statue on pedestal	Bronze & granite		Grade II*	Q7604480	
	Thomas Sutton	Charterhouse School, Surrey	1911	Statue on plinth with plaques	Bronze & stone		Grade II	Q26296559	
More images	An Indian Procession known as The Minto Panels	Victoria Memorial, Kolkata	1913	Four deep-relief panels	Bronze			Q126372403	Previously on the pedestal to John's statue of Gilbert Elliot-Murray-Kynynmound, 4th Earl of Minto, the panels are now located on and near to the base of the statue of Queen Victoria by George Frampton
More images	Memorial to the Engine Room Heroes of the Titanic	Pier Head, Liverpool	1916	Obelisk with statues	Bronze & stone		Grade II*	Q3305518	
More images	Edward VII	Pier Head, Liverpool	1916	Equestrian statue on pedestal	Bronze		Grade II	Q26320984	
More images	Saint David Blessing the People	The Marble Hall, Cardiff City Hall	1916	Statue on pedestal	Marble				
	Lieutenant Colonel A. Carteret-Thynne DSO	Parish Church of St. James the Great, Kilkhampton, Cornwall	1917	Tablet with figure & plaque	Marble & bronze				Carteret-Thynne was killed in action in 1917, having also served in the South African War.
More images	Statue of Viscount Wolseley	Horse Guards Parade, London	1917	Equestrian statue on pedestal	Bronze & Portland stone		Grade II	Q18159880	
More images	Lord Ninian Crichton-Stuart	Cathays Park, Cardiff	1917	Statue on plinth	Bronze & stone		Grade II	Q29491669	
	Capt H B Knott and Major J L Knott DSO	St Andrew's Church, Heddon-on-the-Wall, Northumberland	1918	Tablet with relief figures	Marble	1.2m by 1.5m			

=== 1920–1929 ===
Image	Title / subject	Location and coordinates	Date	Type	Material	Dimensions	Designation	Wikidata	Notes
More images	Caradog, Griffith Rhys Jones	Victoria Square, Aberdare	1920	Statue on pedestal	Bronze & stone		Grade II	Q29489462	
More images	Evelyn Baring, 1st Earl of Cromer	Westminster Abbey, London	1920	Plaque with medallion portrait	Marble				
More images	War memorial	Bryn Square, Lampeter	1921	Statue on pedestal and raised terrace	Bronze & granite	4.5m high	Grade II	Q29489055	Terrace & wall designed by Llewllyn Bankes-Price
More images	Port Sunlight War Memorial	Port Sunlight, Merseyside	1921	Celtic Cross on an octagonal podium with eleven sculptured figures and twelve relief panels.	Bronze & granite	11.5m high	Grade I	Q15979246	AB Burton (foundry); William Kirkpatrick Ltd (builders)
More images	David Lloyd George	National Museum Cardiff	1921	Bust	Bronze, marble base	35.5cm			
More images	David Lloyd George	Castle Square, Caernarfon	1921	Statue on plinth	Bronze & stone		Grade II	Q29483625	AB Burton (foundry); Base by J Fletcher of Caernarfon.
	Sir Stanley Maude	Baghdad, Iraq	1921	Equestrian statue	Bronze				Pedestal by Edward Prioleau Warren, destroyed c. 1958
	Statue of Sir John Tomlinson Brunner	Grounds of Brunner-Mond works, Winnington, Cheshire	1922	Statue on pedestal	Bronze & granite		Grade II	Q15979536	
More images	Thomas Charles Edwards	Old College, Aberystwyth	1922	Statue on pedestal	Bronze & granite		Grade II	Q29488944	AB Burton (foundry)
More images	War memorial	Town Hall Gardens, Llanelli	1923	Relief panel and cenotaph	Bronze & granite		Grade II	Q29490305	
More images	Northumberland Fusiliers Memorial "The Response 1914"	Barras Bridge, Newcastle upon Tyne	1923	Bronze relief figures on a granite base with three granite figures on the reverse	Bronze & granite		Grade I	Q17552582	AB Burton (foundry); William Kirkpatrick Ltd (builders)
More images	War memorial	Alexandra Gardens, Penarth	1924	Obelisk-mounted sculpture on stepped plinth	Bronze & granite		Grade II	Q29491428	
More images	Royal Welch Fusiliers memorial	Junction of Bodhfryd Rd. & Chester Rd., Wrexham	1924	Twin sculptures on pedestal	Bronze & stone		Grade II	Q29481992	
	Carmarthen County war memorial	Priory Street, Carmarthen	1924	Statue on pedestal and plinth	Bronze & Portland stone	4.5m high	Grade II	Q29504987	
More images	Llandaff Cathedral School war memorial	Cathedral Green, Llandaff, Cardiff	1924	3 Sculptures on pedestals	Bronze & stone		Grade II	Q29491677	
More images	Tomb of Lord and Lady Leverhulme	Christ Church, Port Sunlight	c. 1925	Pair of chest tombs with effigies	Bronze and black marble		Grade II*		
More images	James Rice Buckley	Cathedral Green, Llandaff	1927	Statue on pedestal	Bronze & granite		Grade II	Q29491672	
	Basil Webb	Crypt of Lady Chapel, Hereford Cathedral		Reredos with figures of 3 saints					Basil Webb was the son of Henry Webb who funded the memorial.

=== 1930 and later ===
Image	Title / subject	Location and coordinates	Date	Type	Material	Dimensions	Designation	Wikidata	Notes
More images	Evan James & James James	Ynysangharad Park, Pontypridd	1930	Two statues on plinths	Bronze		Grade II*	Q17743403	
More images	Seymour Berry, 1st Baron Buckland	Outside Central Library, Merthyr Tydfil	1931	Statue on pedestal	Bronze & stone		Grade II	Q29489898	
More images	Bishop Edward Bevan	Brecon Cathedral, Powys	1935	Effigy on base	Bronze and stone		Grade 1		
More images	George V	Entrance to Queensway Tunnel, Liverpool	1939	Statue	Bronze				
More images	Queen Mary	Entrance to Queensway Tunnel, Liverpool	1939	Statue	Bronze				
More images	Bishop Joshua Pritchard Hughes	Llandaff Cathedral, Cardiff	1940	Plaque	Bronze				

== Other works ==
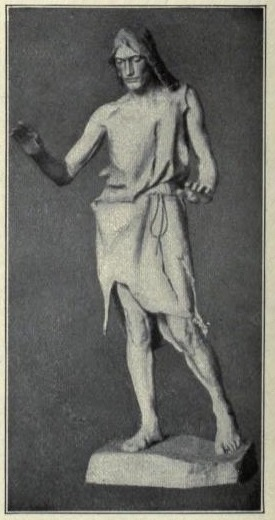
Saint John the Baptist

John exhibited medals on at least seven occasions at the Royal Academy between 1898 and 1918. He designed the medal for the 1911 investiture of Edward VIII as Prince of Wales and the King George V Silver Jubilee Medal in 1935. During his career John also produced medals and seals for several organisations in Wales. These included medal designs for the Cardiff School of Art and the Welsh Nursing Association plus seals for the National Museum Wales, the Merthyr Tydfil Corporation and the Church of Wales. For the National Eisteddfod Association he designed a medal with bardic images.

John's output was prolific and also includes monuments to Lord Salisbury in Westminster Abbey and at St Etheldreda's Church, Hatfield. John's output also included:

- Sculptures on Electra House in Moorgate, City of London, dating from 1900 to 1903 and representing Egypt, Japan, India and China.
- The work Grief dating to 1890.
- Figures of Edward VII and Queen Alexandra on the facade of the Victoria and Albert Museum, 1906.
- Carved figures on a reredos in St John the Baptist Church, Cardiff.
- Designed the regalia for the investiture of the Prince of Wales at Caernarfon in 1911.
- Merlin and Arthur (c. 1896), a bronze in the collection of the National Museum Wales which was exhibited at the Royal Academy in 1902.
- Memorial relief to Canon Guy D.D, (1897) in Llandaff Cathedral.
- Bust of the artist John Macallan Swan.
- Bust of Frederick Stanley, Earl of Derby in Preston Town Hall.
- Bust of Lewis Morris, exhibited in 1899 at the Royal Academy.
- Marble statue of Sir John Woodburn, erected Uttar Pradesh 1906, placed in storage at the Uttar Pradesh State Museum during 1958–59
- Marble statue of Sir Digbijai Singh, erected Lucknow 1907, moved to State Museum Lucknow during 1981–82
- Bronze equestrian statue of Gilbert Elliot-Murray-Kynynmound, 4th Earl of Minto, Viceroy of India, erected 1914 at Kolkata and subsequently moved to Barrackpore
- 1915 memorial relief panel in copper and bronze to Sir Patrick Playfair, 1852–1915, St. Paul's Cathedral, Kolkata
- Busts of William Cadwallader and Sir Isambard Owen in the Main Building of Bangor University
