= Lever & Kitchen =

Lever & Kitchen was a major manufacturer, now part of Unilever.

Lever & Kitchen may also refer to:

- Lever Brothers, British manufacturing company
- Lever Brothers Factory, Balmain, New South Wales, Australia
- W. H. Burford & Sons, Australian business that merged with Lever & Kitchen
