= John Gray (New South Wales politician) =

English-born Australian politician

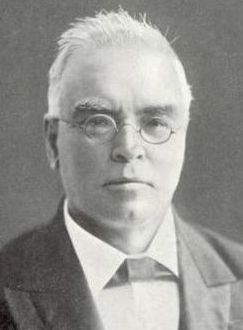

Senator for New South Wales
- In office 1 January 1904 – 30 June 1910

Personal details
- Born: 1 December 1840 York, England
- Died: 20 April 1914 (aged 73) Ashfield, New South Wales, Australia
- Party: Free Trade (1903–06); Anti-Socialist (1906–09); Liberal (1909–10)
- Spouse: Elizabeth Dunning (m. 1865)
- Occupation: Businessman

John Proctor Gray (1 December 1840 – 20 April 1914) was an Australian businessman and politician. He served as a Senator for New South Wales from 1904 to 1910, representing the Free Trade Party and Liberal Party. Prior to his election to parliament he was active in the federation movement and was a senior manager for Lever Brothers.

== Early life ==
Gray was born on 1 December 1840 at Stonegate, York, England. He was the son of Mary (née Proctor) and Henry Gray. His father worked as a joiner and cabinetmaker.

After leaving school Gray "followed commercial pursuits". According to one source he was also active in the cooperative movement in England. In the mid-1880s Gray became associated with the newly created Lever Brothers firm and its Sunlight Soap brand. He managed several branches of Lever Brothers in England, then in 1888 moved to Sydney to establish an Australian division of the company. Gray subsequently oversaw the establishment of the Lever Brothers Factory in Balmain, importing tallow from England and copra from the Pacific Islands. In 1900 he was made Lever Brothers' inaugural chairman in Australia when a local board of directors was established.

== Politics ==
Gray was active in the movement for the federation of the Australian colonies in the 1890s. He was a member of the Australasian Federation League of New South Wales and served as vice-chairman of the league's United Federal Executive, which managed the campaign for the "Yes" vote at the 1899 New South Wales referendum on federation. Outside of the federation movement, Gray supported free trade and was a "close personal acquaintance" of George Reid, the leader of the Free Trade Party. It has been suggested that his political views "may have been influenced by extensive travel throughout Australasia, and by his position as chairman of a British subsidiary company in which he had to cope with the morass of intercolonial duties, customs and tariffs".

Gray was an unsuccessful candidate for a Senate seat in New South Wales at the inaugural 1901 federal election. He subsequently stood in Balmain South at the 1901 New South Wales state election, but was defeated by the incumbent Australian Labor Party (ALP) MP Sydney Law. He was also a candidate for the casual vacancy in the Senate caused by the resignation of Richard O'Connor.

At the 1903 federal election, Gray was elected to a six-year Senate term beginning on 1 January 1904, standing as a Free Trader. He served on several select committees and was a member of the royal commissions into old-age pensions and the tobacco monopoly. On the latter commission he submitted a dissenting report recommending against nationalisation of the tobacco industry. Gray spoke on a wide range of topics, although he was often absent from the Senate due to ill health. He was one of the few senators to oppose the use of the dictation test in the White Australia policy, describing it as "insulting legislation [...] obnoxious to Eastern nations".

Gray supported the "Fusion" of the Free Trade and Protectionist parties into a new Liberal Party in 1909. He unsuccessfully sought re-election as a Liberal candidate at the 1910 federal election. The Bulletin summarised Gray's contributions as follows:

He made soap, was a Freetrader with a leaning to Protection for soap; and was, for a short time, a Senator for N.S.W. in the soap interest.

== Personal life ==
In 1865, Gray married Elizabeth Dunning, with whom he had six children. He died at his home in Ashfield, New South Wales, on 18 April 1914, following a brain aneurysm.

Gray was active in the Yorkshire Society of New South Wales and served a term as president. He was a supporter of the Orange Order and in 1908 was the lead speaker at the Orangemens' Day celebrations in Sydney, in which he called on its members to "uphold the dominancy of the Protestant faith" and "prevent the attempts which are being made to bring about Roman Catholic dominance in the parliaments of Australia and in every phase of your social and municipal life".
