= W. H. Burford & Sons =

Australian manufacturer of soap and candles

W. H. Burford and Sons was a soap and candle-making business founded in Adelaide, Australia in 1840 by William Henville Burford (1807–1895), an English butcher who arrived in the new colony in 1838. It was one of the earliest soap makers in Australia and, up to the 1960s when it closed, the oldest.

In 1878, Burford took his two sons, Benjamin and William, into partnership as W. H. Burford & Sons. The expansion of the company, in the latter part of the 19th century and early part of the 20th century, at the hands of son William Burford, accompanied by a number of takeovers, made it the dominant soap manufacturer in South Australia and Western Australia. Its founders were noted public figures in the young city of Adelaide.

W. H. Burford and Sons was in turn taken over by J. Kitchen & Sons, which became Lever & Kitchen, part of the British Lever Brothers empire, which in 1930 merged with Dutch Margarine Unie to form the multi-national Unilever.

== W. H. Burford and Sons ==
=== Factories ===
W. H. Burford's first factory was on the corner of Grenfell Street and East Terrace, later the site of an Adelaide Electric Supply Company building.

Initially, the factory was little more than a tin shed in a vacant field. During one of the recessions that faced the colony, to keep the business running, Burford was forced to sell the land and lease it back.

The second factory, opened in 1900 at Sturt Street, previously owned by competitor Tidmarsh & Co, occupied 4 acres of floor space (19,000 sq yards / 16,000m^{2} / 1.6 hectares ) and employed over 200 men. Its most salient feature was the brick chimney – 152 ft 4in (46.5m) in height, with a flue diameter of 4 ft (1.2m), which is still standing although no longer used. The boiler room housed four boilers, one of which was 27 ft long and 7 ft 6in in diameter (8.2m x 2.3m) and the largest built in South Australia. The still-room had six large stills: four for distillation of stearine and two for glycerine. The building was organised so that manufacture started on the top floor and progressed by chutes or conveyors to the second floor for wrapping and packaging, and thence to the ground floor, all with a minimum of handling. The smell emanating from the Sturt Street factory, despite installation of deep drainage, was the source of much complaint from neighbours.

In 1887, Burfords took over Apollo Soap Ltd of Adam Street, Hindmarsh. The factory, which continued to be called the "Apollo Works", was the site of work mostly peripheral to the core business of soap and candle making, such as rendering down of animal fats and grinding of corn, bone, starch and blacking, and the manufacture of wooden packing crates. In 1888, they took over Frearson's Printing Works, whose factory was also on Adam Street. Those premises were destroyed by fire on 25 December 1907.

In February 1919, the Sturt Street premises were destroyed by fire. Rather than rebuild in the city, a new factory was set up in Dry Creek near the railway station, where there had once been a smelter. Manufacture resumed in 1922.

Much was made at the time of a model suburb to serve employees of the soap works and the nearby abattoirs. "Burford Garden Suburb" as it was named, was designed by W. J. Earle, the town planner behind Cadbury's model town at Claremont, Tasmania. The Dry Creek lots were snapped up immediately they were offered for sale. The greater part of the Sturt Street property was sold around the same time."Burford Gardens" as the name of a suburb has since vanished, though its streets remain: Flame Avenue, Gum Avenue, Wattle Avenue, Grevillea Avenue and Bushwood Avenue, all in what is now known as the suburb of Dry Creek.

In Western Australia, the Victoria Park factory opened in 1897. After taking over the Swan Soap and Candle Company Ltd., the Rocky Bay factory opened in 1899, and Kalgoorlie factories opened later.

In 1924 Burford's merged with rival soap makers J. Kitchen and Sons of Melbourne and Lever Brothers of Sydney as Australian Producers Co-Partnership Ltd. In 1928 Kitchen's Fremantle factory was destroyed by fire, and Burford's was able to make up the shortfall by manufacturing to Kitchen specifications, the product being wrapped, packed and distributed by the Kitchen factory. This opened the way for further rationalization, and by 1937 all Burford factories were under the control of J Kitchen & Sons. In 1932 Associated Producers became Associated Enterprises Pty Ltd, renamed Lever Associated Enterprises Pty Ltd in 1944. By 1948 production by Burfords in Adelaide had been wound down and in 1957 Unilever (Australia) bought out W. H. Burford & Sons.

=== Products ===
Products manufactured during the history of W. H. Burford & Sons include:

- Soaps: "Burford's Prize No 1" soap, "Signal" soap, mottled soap, yellow soap, transparent soap, White Naptha soap, Apollo laundry soap in various sized bars, Borax soap, "Sayso" carbolic family soap, "Snowflakes" extract of soap powder, Dr Bayley's medicated soap, sulphur soap, White Dove soap, and kerosene soap (foliage spray for controlling insects)
- "Exhibition" candles, carriage candles, bedroom candles, piano candles
- "Brunswick" stove blacking
- "Excelsior" blacklead
- Linoleum polish ("Roylat" brand in Western Australia)
- Boot polish, boot cream
- "Swansdown" starch
- Soda crystals
- Magic Egg Preserver (waterglass)
- "Southern Sky" washing blue
- Snow-white starch
- Lubricating oils
- Greases
- Bone manure

=== Public nuisance ===
When Burford's soapworks and Peacock's tannery were founded on Grenfell Street, there were no residences nearby; nothing but virgin bushland. But as the population grew nearby (and to some extent attracted by the businesses), the number of complaints about smells grew until, in 1866, a case was brought against Burford in the Supreme Court. The jury appeared to be convinced by the argument that the complainants had chosen to build knowing what trades were carried on there so had no right to complain, and found for the defendant.

The Council had other plans. In 1919 it offered Burfords £12,000 as an incentive to move out of the city altogether. The offer was turned down, so the Council amended the Health Act to prohibit such industries, then the fire engulfed the factory and the Dry Creek facility moved a big step towards reality.

=== Fires ===
In 1885 a fire which started in a timber yard in Grenfell Street and East Terrace spread to Burford's factory, which was destroyed. This led to the establishment of a factory in Sturt Street.

On 25 December 1907, the factory on Adam Street, Hindmarsh, "The Apollo Works" was destroyed in one of the greatest fires in Adelaide's history, along with neighbouring skin dealers Wilcox and Co. in Torrens Street (now named River Street). The nearby factory of G. H. Michell & Sons and David Reid's tannery suffered lesser damage.

In 1919 the works bounded by Sturt, Gilbert, Norman and Russell Streets in the city were destroyed by fire and a new factory was then set up in Dry Creek; the office area was rebuilt and the rest sold.

=== Competitors ===
Other early soap and candle makers of South Australia included:

- J. H. M. Hawkes
- J. Tidmarsh & Co.
- Walker Brothers
- Apollo Soap and Candle factory at Adams Street, Hindmarsh. (est. 1881) was taken over by W. H. Burford.
- Bunyip Soaps (1898 – ca.1955) had a factory at Winwood Street, Southwark, and became Crompton Bunyip Soaps Ltd. (c. 1955 – c. 1991) It was still trading in 1962 with offices at 49 Flinders Street, Adelaide, and factory at Winwood St, Thebarton.

The other major Australian soap manufacturer was J. Kitchen & Sons of Melbourne, which dominated the Eastern States much as Burfords had dominated South and Western Australia. Lever Brothers of England had a factory in Sydney and one in Wellington, New Zealand.

=== Merger and Acquisition ===
In 1924, Lever and Kitchen and W. H. Burford & Sons formed Australian Producers Partnership Pty Ltd. Burford ordinary shares were held by Lever and Kitchen; around 1962 after a few more takeovers the parent company was renamed Unilever. The Burford's factory was still running profitably in the mid-50s, and the factory at Dry Creek was still listed as such in 1962; the office at 83 Sturt Street still bore the Burford's name, alongside that of its nominal owner J. Kitchen & Sons Ltd, Rexona Pty. Ltd. and Lever Brothers Pty. Ltd.

== William Burford ==
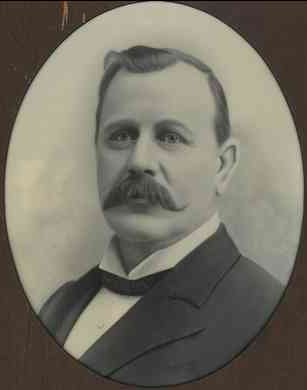
William Henry Burford 1893

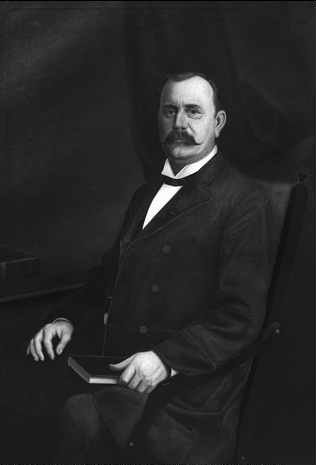
1892 portrait in oil of William Burford by his son, artist Frederick Rumsey Burford (1870–1928)

William Burford (11 December 1845 – 6 March 1925) was born in a cottage at 154 Grenfell Street, Adelaide, adjacent to his father's factory.

He was educated first at the Church of England Grammar School in Pulteney Street then, with brother Benjamin, at J. L. Young's Adelaide Educational Institution in Stephens Place. Leaving school, he joined his father's business. In 1878 he and his brother Benjamin were taken into partnership, but after about eight years the latter withdrew from the enterprise.

In 1868, while on holiday in New Zealand, William visited a soap works which boiled soap using steam rather than fire. On his return to Adelaide he wasted no time in getting his father to adopt this method.

He was chairman of directors of the company from 1895 until his death, in his Belair home (on Sheoak Road) called "Birralee". When he took the reins, the company had 6 employees; at the time of his death it had grown to over 500 spread over several factories, though his time as a hands-on manager had long since passed.

=== Philanthropy and Public Works ===
William Burford's many offices, services and philanthropic deeds included:

Justice of the Peace from 1890 to 1893.
For over 60 years he was a member of the council of the Chamber of Manufactures, and served both as president and vice-president.
For some years he was a member of the Adelaide Hospital Board, resigning in 1913.
He was on the committee of the Home for Incurables.
He was on the board of the Adelaide Licensing Bench from 1902.
For 12 years he served as a member of the Unley Council.
He was alderman and councillor on the Glenelg Council.
He was a vice-president of the Industrial School for the Blind and Royal Institution for the Blind from its foundation, and of the organising committee for its Great Floral Fair.
He was treasurer of Adelaide City Mission until 1902.
He was on the board of the Adelaide Benevolent and Strangers' Friend Society.
He was on the board of the Belair Inebriate Retreat.
He was a life member of the Adelaide YMCA, and its president from 1914.
He was, like his father, a lifelong member of the Church of Christ, originally with the Grote Street Church, then Unley and Glenelg, which were established largely due to his generosity.
He donated his property in Unley to the Church of Christ, to assist in establishing Ellerslie College, a Church of Christ school for girls at Magill Road, Magill.
For over 30 years he supported Church missions to India and China.
He was a generous supporter of the British and Foreign Bible Society.

Mrs Burford was a prominent member of the Wattle Blossom League (later Wattle Day League) and held an annual function at "Monomeith", the Burfords' summer residence at Ashton.

=== Recreation ===
He was a life member of the South Australian Cricket Association and a member of the East Adelaide Cricket Club.

In his later years he was a serious bowls player.

He was a keen yachtsman, was a member of the Holdfast Bay Sailing Club (and Vice-commodore in 1896) and with son F. R. Burford owned the yacht Empress 1894 – 1896.

=== Family of William Burford ===
William married Mary Richardson (c. 1845 – 12 May 1921) on 11 November 1867. She died at their home "Birralee", in Glenelg. Their 53 year marriage produced eleven children, of whom five sons and four daughters survived childhood. All five sons went into the family business:

- William Henville Burford II (1 November 1868 – 27 May 1947) married Alice Louise Carr on 17 September 1891
- Two daughters Nell Burford and Violet Lillian Burford
- Frederick Rumsey Burford (10 or 30 April 1870 – 14 August 1928 at Glenelg) married Elizabeth Genevieve Kellery
- Hubert Henry Richardson Burford (22 Mar 1872 – 8 Nov 1907 in Sydney, two weeks after wedding) married Annie Morish on 23 October 1907
- Lillian May Burford – b: 2 March 1874. m: Thomas Eyres 13 October 1899
- Evaline Sarah Burford (10 February 1876 – 6 Apr 1961, Fullarton) married Horace Cansfield Park on 11 November 1919. Evaline lived in Birralee, Belair in the 1930s
- Emily Finlayson "Emmie" Burford (10 Jun 1878 – 23 Oct 1953) never married – lived at Birralee, Belair in the 1920s and 1930s.
- Horace Edgar Colls Burford (11 September 1881 – 24 Jan 1947) married Sibyl Freda Jay on 11 November 1915
- James Clifford Burford (6 October 1883 – 6 Feb 1970, Fullarton) married Margaret Mary Marshall, who died in 1920s. He was Detective Inspector of Customs. Lived at Birralee, Belair in 1930s.
  - Only daughter Gwenyth Marshall Burford – engaged to Ronald F Angel, 18 February 1936 but married Wilfred Douglas Verco, 8 August 1938
    - Richard Verco
- Alice Gertrude Marion "Allie Marian" Burford (30 Jan 1886 – 7 September 1925 at her residence, Birralee, Belair) married Octavius Cyril Beale, eighth son of Octavius Beale of 'Llanarth', Burwood NSW, on 11 November 1914; her parents' wedding anniversary, a tradition followed by several of her siblings
  - Two daughters: Beverley Burford Beale and Megan Beale

After the death of his wife, he sold the Glenelg mansion "Birralee" on Albert Terrace and Seawall, in September 1921, and the summer home "Monomeith", on 3 acres (1.2 ha) at Ashton, South Australia, in 1922. By 1921, both the Monomeith and Birralee Glenelg properties were mostly used by Mrs. Burford and her daughters.

He died on 6 March 1925 at his "Birralee, Belair" home on Sheoak Road in Belair, located next to the National Park and overlooking the Adelaide Plains. He had suffered a heart attack a year previously. At some stage he had married the widow of William Finlayson jun. and she nursed him in his final years.

== Sources ==
- The State Library of South Australia has a useful index of Burford articles at http://www.slsa.sa.gov.au/manning/pn/b/b31.htm#burfordG
- and of the factories in Hindmarsh at http://www.slsa.sa.gov.au/manning/pn/h/hindmar.htm#factories
