= Birralee, Belair =

Mansions in Adelaide, Australia

Coordinates: 34°59′47″S 138°38′04″E

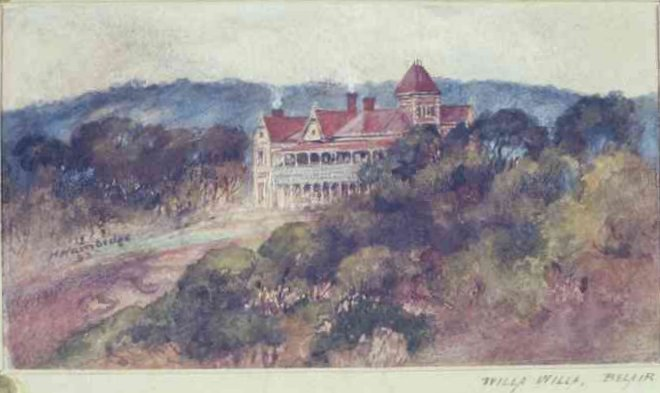
A painting of Willa Willa by Helen Hambidge, 1893

Birralee is the name of two mansions in Adelaide which were associated with William Burford.

== Willa Willa and Birralee, Belair ==
"Birralee" at Belair, South Australia at 49 Sheoak Road, adjacent to Belair National Park, and overlooking the Adelaide Plains, was originally named "Willa Willa" when it was built in 1887 by Thomas Kinley Hamilton. On his death the estate was subdivided, and that portion containing the main house was later bought by William Burford, who renamed it "Birralee". After Burford's death in 1925, it became the home of his various descendants, then Scotch College, Adelaide, then Belair TB sanatorium, then Repatriation Hospital "Birralee", and then in the 1980s it was used as a drug and alcohol rehabilitation centre.

The well maintained beautiful house, located in well maintained grounds, is now once again a private home.

=== 1899 ===
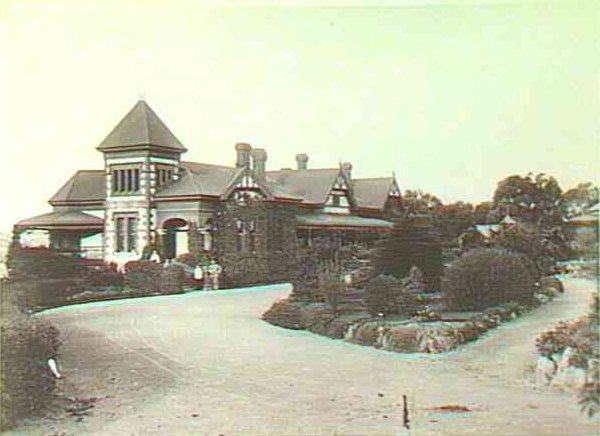
Main entrance

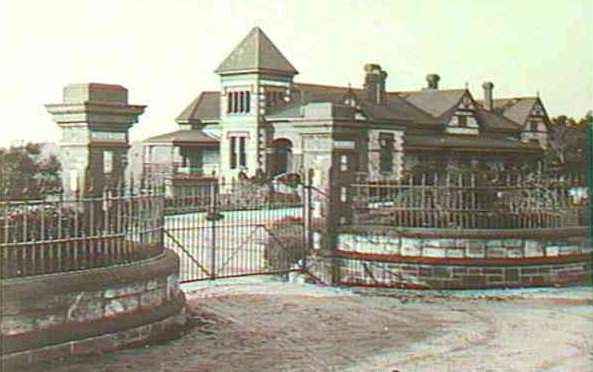
The front gates

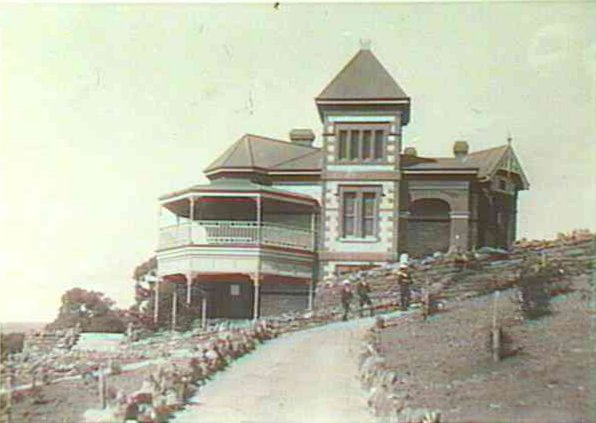
West face

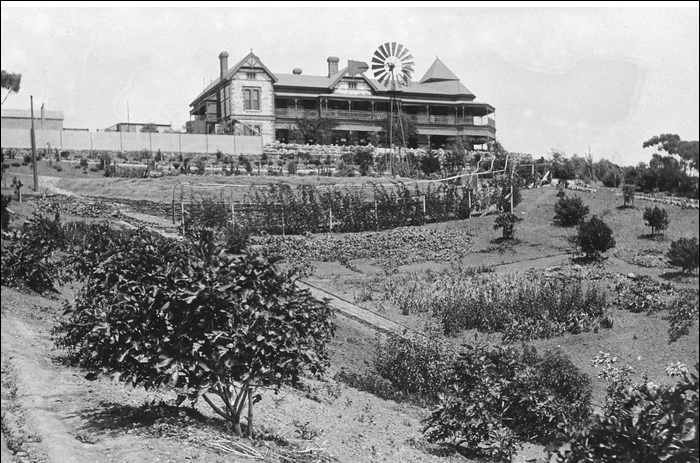
Rear (North face)

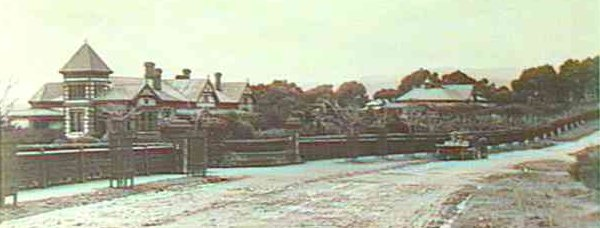
From Sheoak Road (South-West)

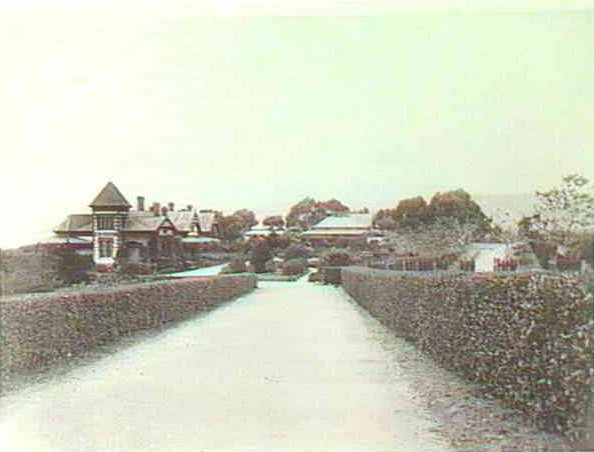
Gardens (WSW)

=== 1897-1917 Thomas Kinley Hamilton ===
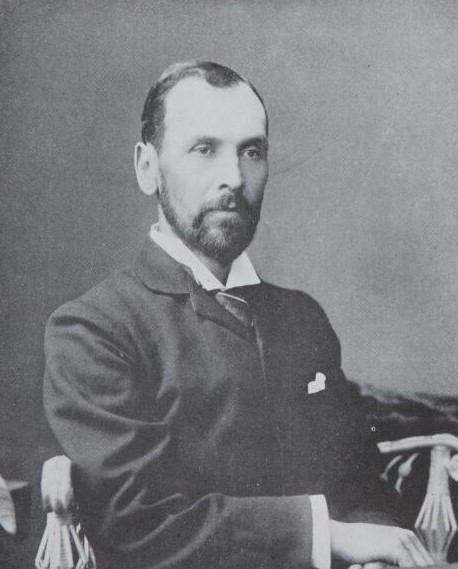
Thomas Kinley Hamilton

Thomas Kinley Hamilton (1853-1917) was an Irish doctor who practised as an ENT surgeon, initially at Laura in the South Australian Mid North. He was also a member of the governing board of the adjacent National Park while he lived at Belair. Hamilton made his money from land speculation and lost significant sums later on Yorke Peninsula land. The estate was extensive in his time, extending all the way to Brownhill Creek, and west to James Road and Old Belair Rd.

His brother built the smaller house to the east on a corner of the estate, and Hamilton donated the land for the Church of the Holy Innocents to be built.

On his death in 1917, the estate was vacant for some time until bought by Gil Culley, an architect who divided the land, converting the stables to an asymmetric Tudor bungalow and attaching the name "Willa Willa" to that house. The coach house was converted to a home, but the infills for the coach stall doors can still be seen.

The whole of the house and its ancillary buildings were connected by an internal road parallel to Sheoak Rd, of which traces are still visible.

=== ca.1919-1925 - William Burford ===
The balance of the estate was later bought by William Burford, but was initially used as a summer residence only as the family's main home was on the foreshore at Glenelg. It was they who renamed it Birralee, a name which occurs frequently in connection with the Burfords and W. H. Burford & Sons, their major soap and candle manufacturing enterprises. This business, which was Australia wide, later became a part of Lever and Kitchen.

=== 1925-1942 - Burford family ===
After Burford's death in 1925, various of his children, and/or their families, continued living in the house. The following is an incomplete list of people who, at one time or other, lived in the house during this period:

- Mr and Mrs H C Park - (Evaline born 10 Feb 1876 married Horace Cansfield Park 11 November 1919.)
- Mr and Mrs J C Burford
  - Gwenyth M Burford
- Alice Mary Burford married [Octavius] Cyril Beale of Vauclause, Sydney. He was the son of Octavius Beale, an Irish-born Australian piano manufacturer and a philanthropist. Alice died 7 September 1925 at her residence, Birralee, Belair. Their two daughters lived at Birralee:
  - Miss Beverley Burford Beale married Bruce Harper Robertson, 2 September 1939.
  - Miss Megan Beale
- Miss Emmie Burford

It was announced in the Advertiser of 2 November 1939 that Mrs. H. Cansfield Park, Mrs. Bruce Harper Robertson, and Miss Burford will be "At Home" at Birralee, Belair, on 10 November.

=== 1942-1944 - Scotch College ===
Reunion marking the 50th anniversary of the wartime use of Birralee and neighbouring Brierly Lodge by Scotch College. (May 1992)

On 1 April 1942, Australian Army officer Captain Lewis, together with two U.S. Army officers, arrived at Scotch College in Torrens Park and informed the Headmaster that they wished to inspect the college and its facilities to determine its suitability as an American army hospital. Lewis recommended that the American Army take possession of the college from 8 May (at the end of first term) until the cessation of hostilities. After considerable searching and investigation, two adjacent houses at Belair, Birralee and Brierley Lodge, were discovered, inspected and found to be suitable. It appears to have become accepted wisdom that Brierly Lodge was the house to the east of Birralee which was built by TKHamilton's brother, but according to the Scotch College old boys, it was the asymmetric Tudor bungalow to the west as modified by Culley and now named Willa Willa. The old boys tell of having the dorm on the open back balcony facing the city. The move from Torrens Park to Belair was executed during the school holidays, and the boarders and domestic staff moved in during the first week of second term. Four large marquees with wooden floors were erected on the drives and front lawns of the properties as classrooms. The arrival of 176 students, including 66 boarders, and 14 resident staff, "put a great strain on the water supply, the plumbing and the septic tanks".

Within a few weeks of the move to Belair, the tide of war in the Pacific turned with the allied naval victory at the Battle of the Coral Sea in May 1942. The American military hospital never eventuated - "The Americans hauled down the stars and stripes at Torrens Park on 15 August". However, they were replaced by the Royal Australian Air Force, and the Torrens Park site became "RAAF Embarkation Depot No.4". In 1943, the tide of war changed again, and the college council asked the RAAF if it could look forward to the college reopening at Torrens Park in 1944. As late as 6 January 1944 the RAAF had still not made a decision, but the college council took "direct action" and the RAAF vacated by 15 January. Teaching resumed at Torrens Park on 15 February 1944.

=== 1944-1952 - Belair TB Sanatorium ===
After the war, the Burfords/Parks/Robertsons/Beales were offered the place again, but declined because of the major changes which had been made to render the place suitable for a school, (some of which, like the ablution block attached to the base of the tower, were really disfiguring.)

In February 1944, the Minister for Repatriation inspected proposed sites for the new TB Sanatorium. The President of the RSA, Major Millhouse, urged the Minister to acquire property at Birralee, Belair, which was formerly occupied by Scotch College. The Minister inspected the site and said that he was favourably impressed.

The Repatriation Sanatorium was opened on 2 June 1945 by His Excellency the Governor, Sir Willoughby Norrie.

=== 1952-1976 - Repatriation Hospital "Birralee" ===
In the period 1 Jan 1952 – 31 Dec 1976, the house was known as Repatriation Hospital "Birralee".

=== 1980s ===
In the 1980s, it was used as a drug and alcohol rehabilitation centre, named St Anthony's.

=== Recent times ===
The well maintained beautiful house, located in well maintained grounds, is now once again a private home, currently belonging to Hans Ehmann and Valmai Spicer.

=== 2011 ===
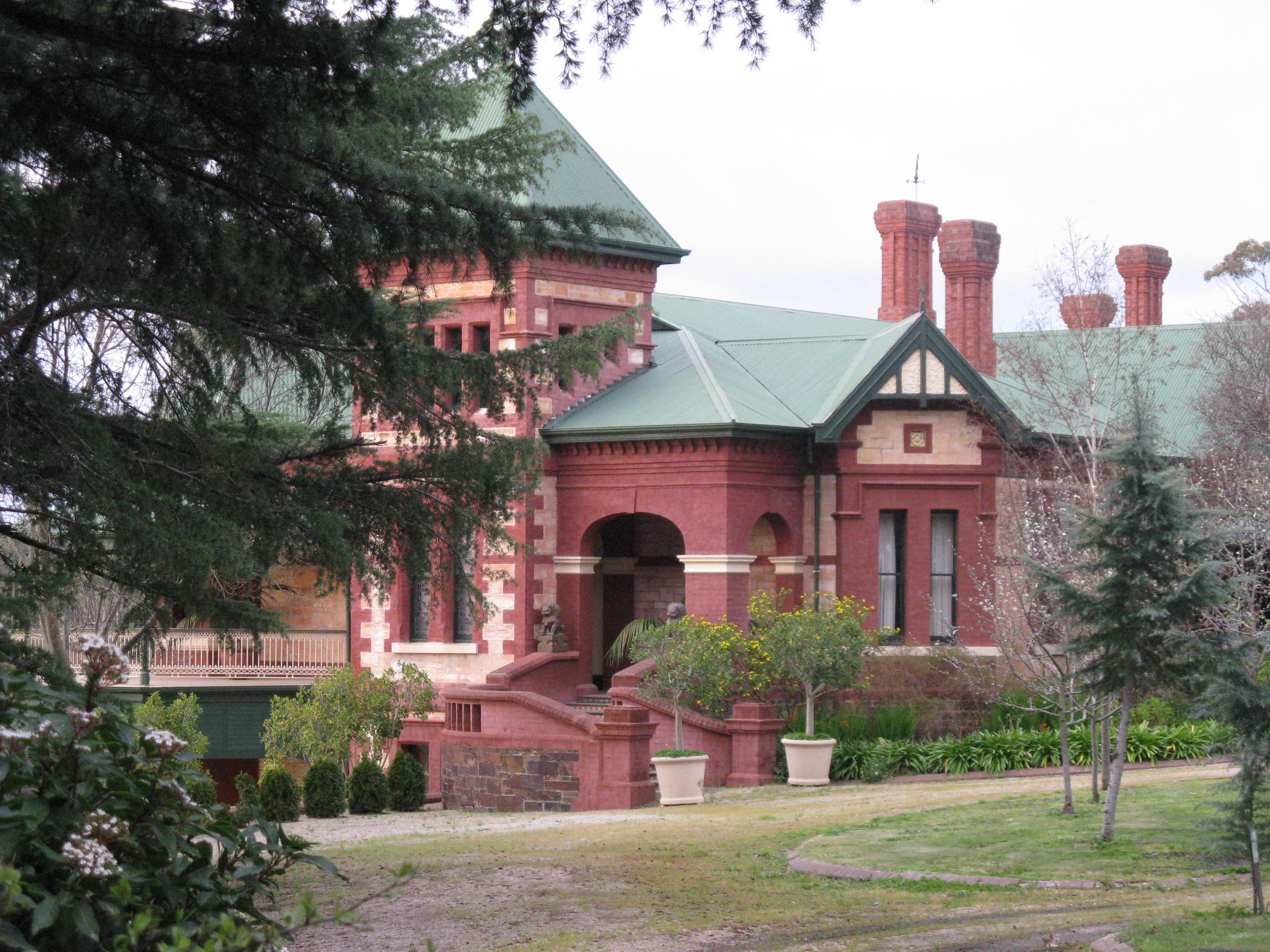
Main entrance

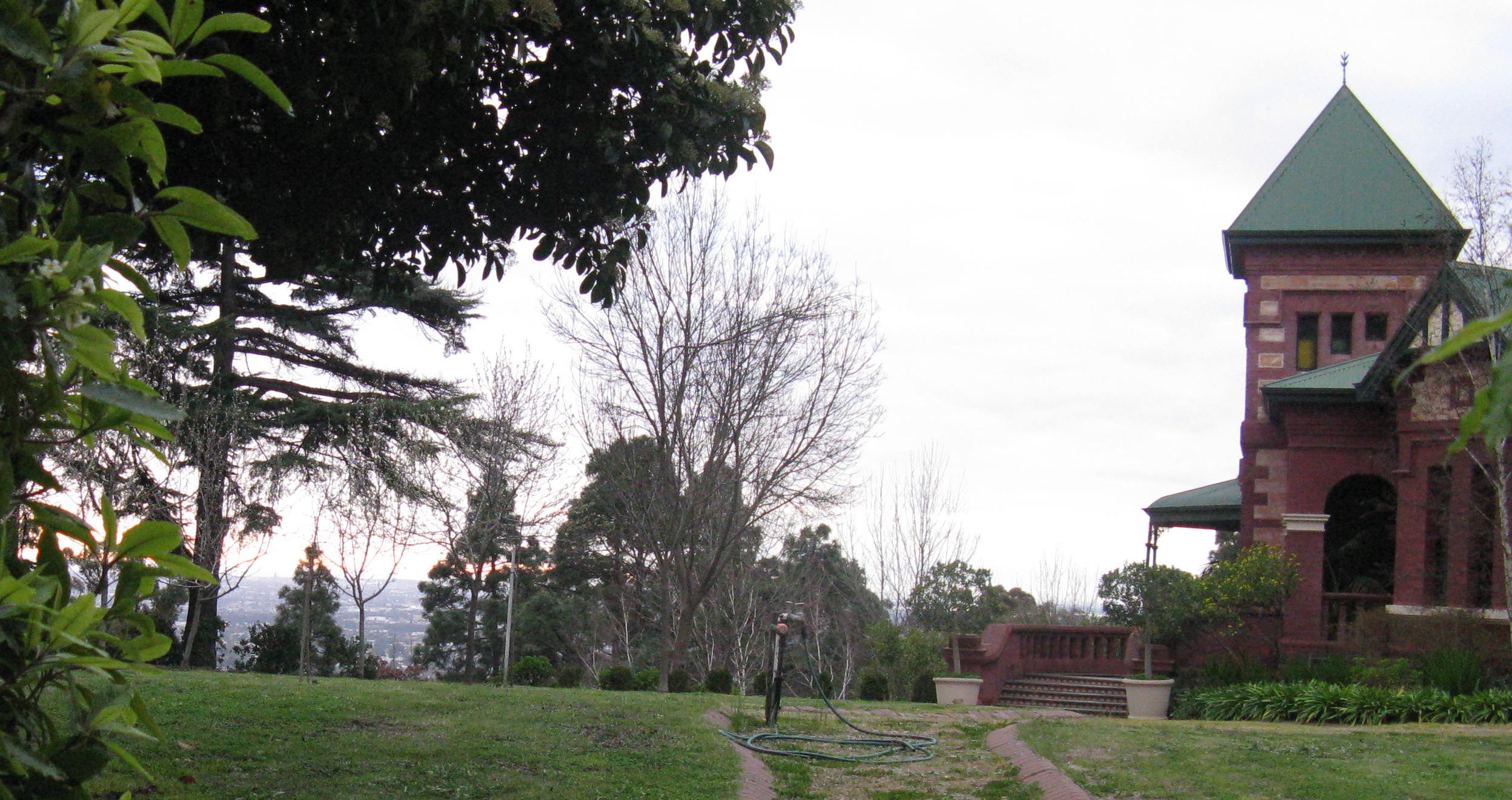
Looking North over the Adelaide Plains

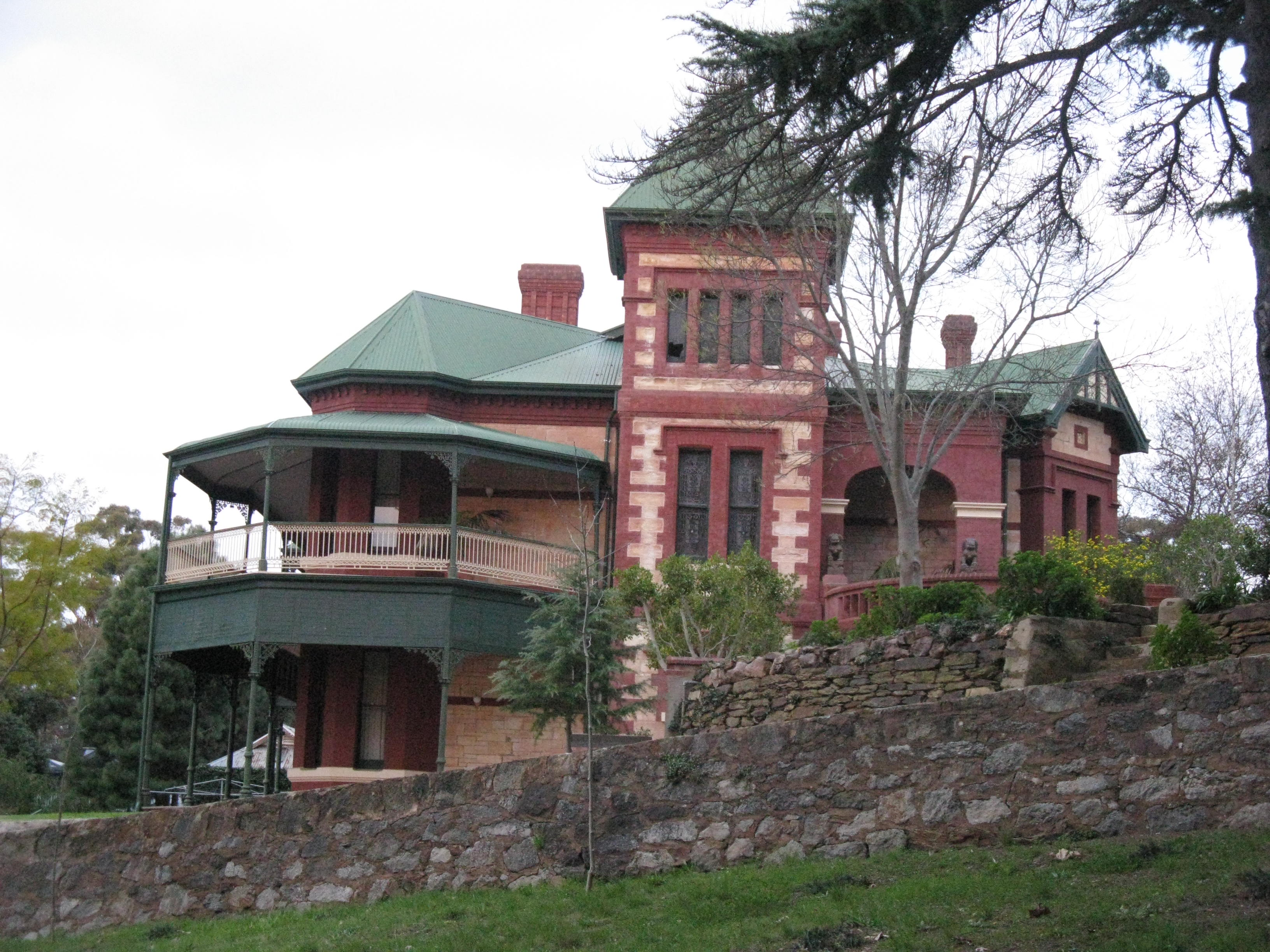
West face

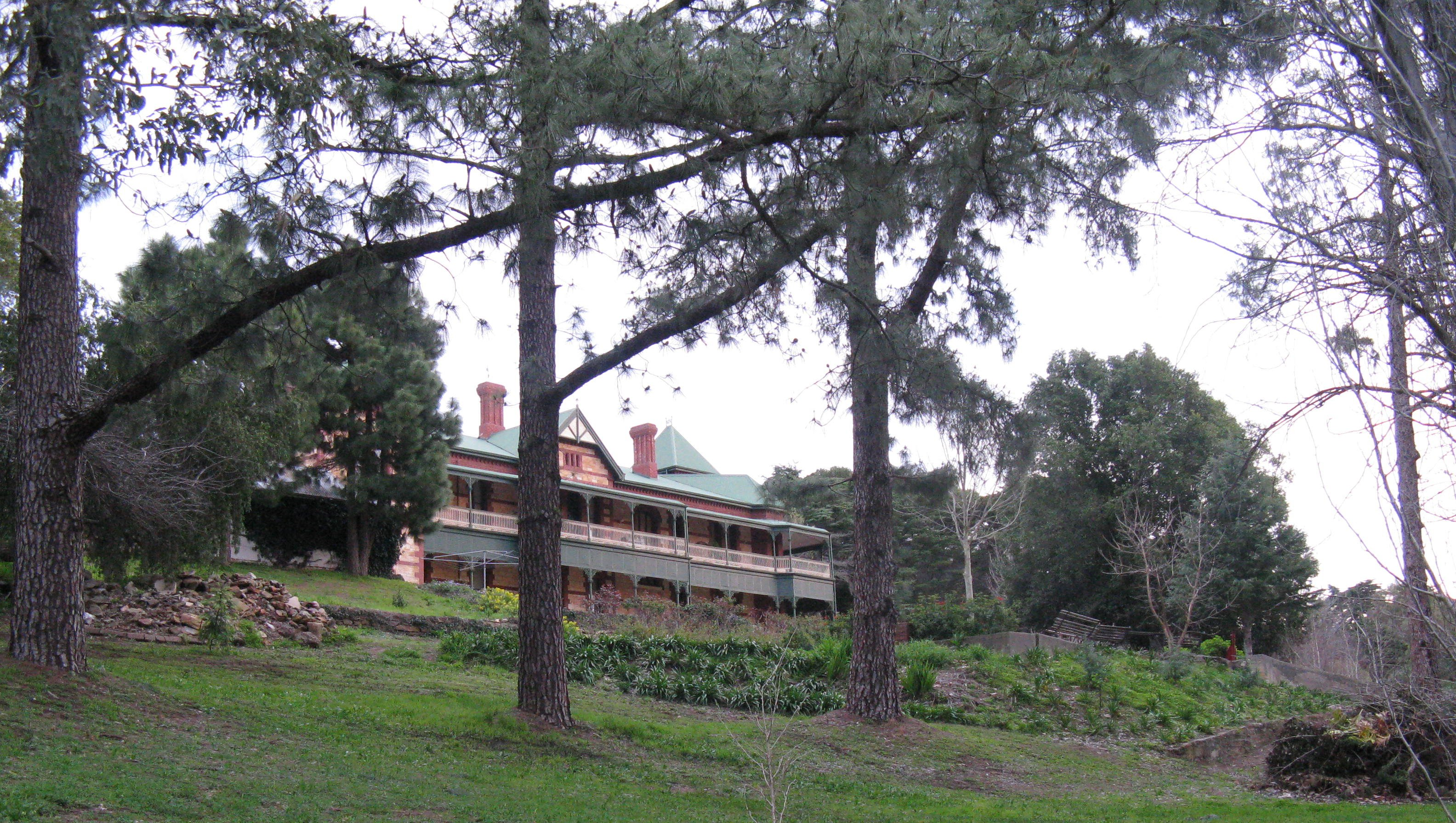
Rear (North face)

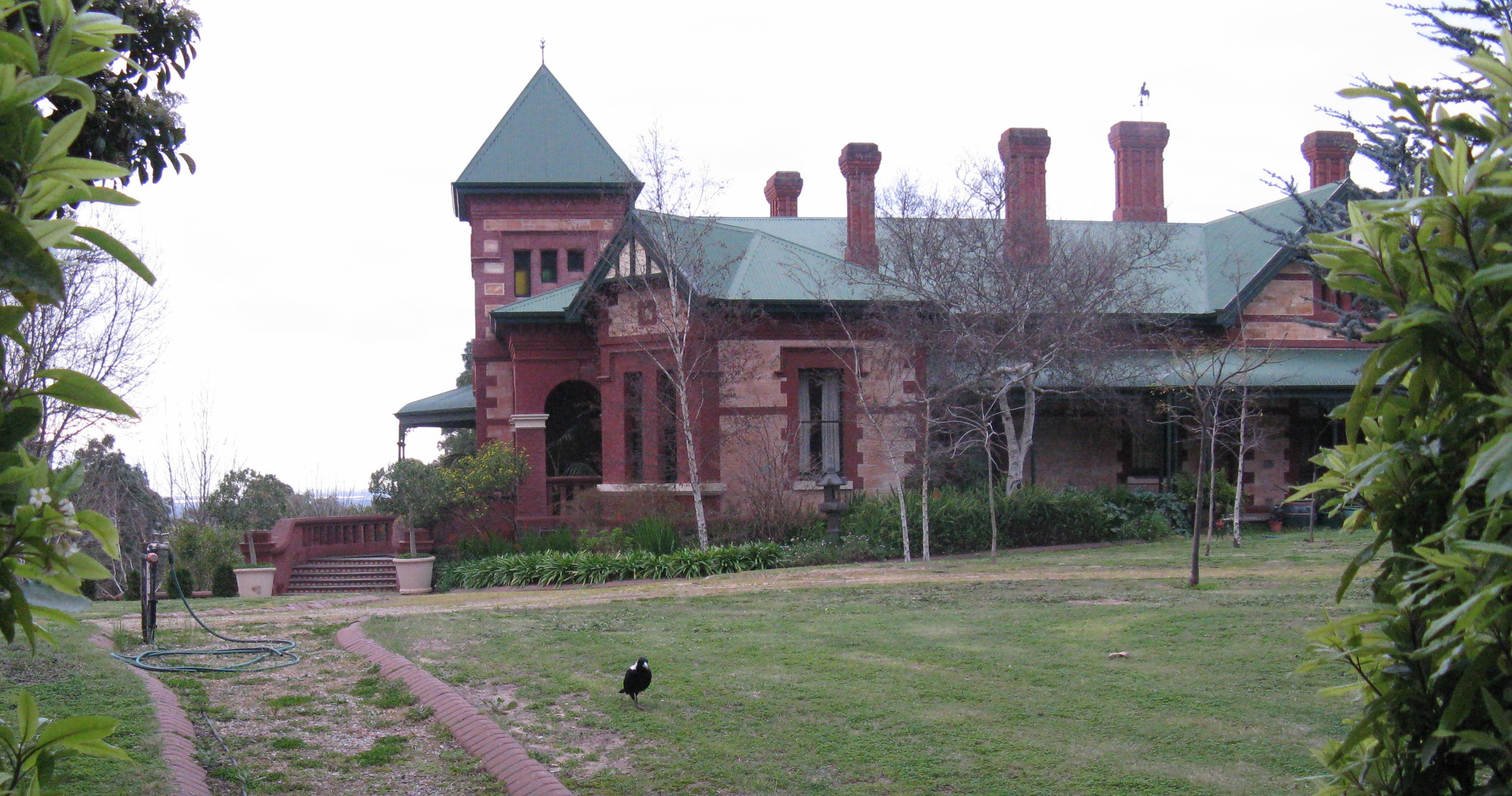
Front (South face)

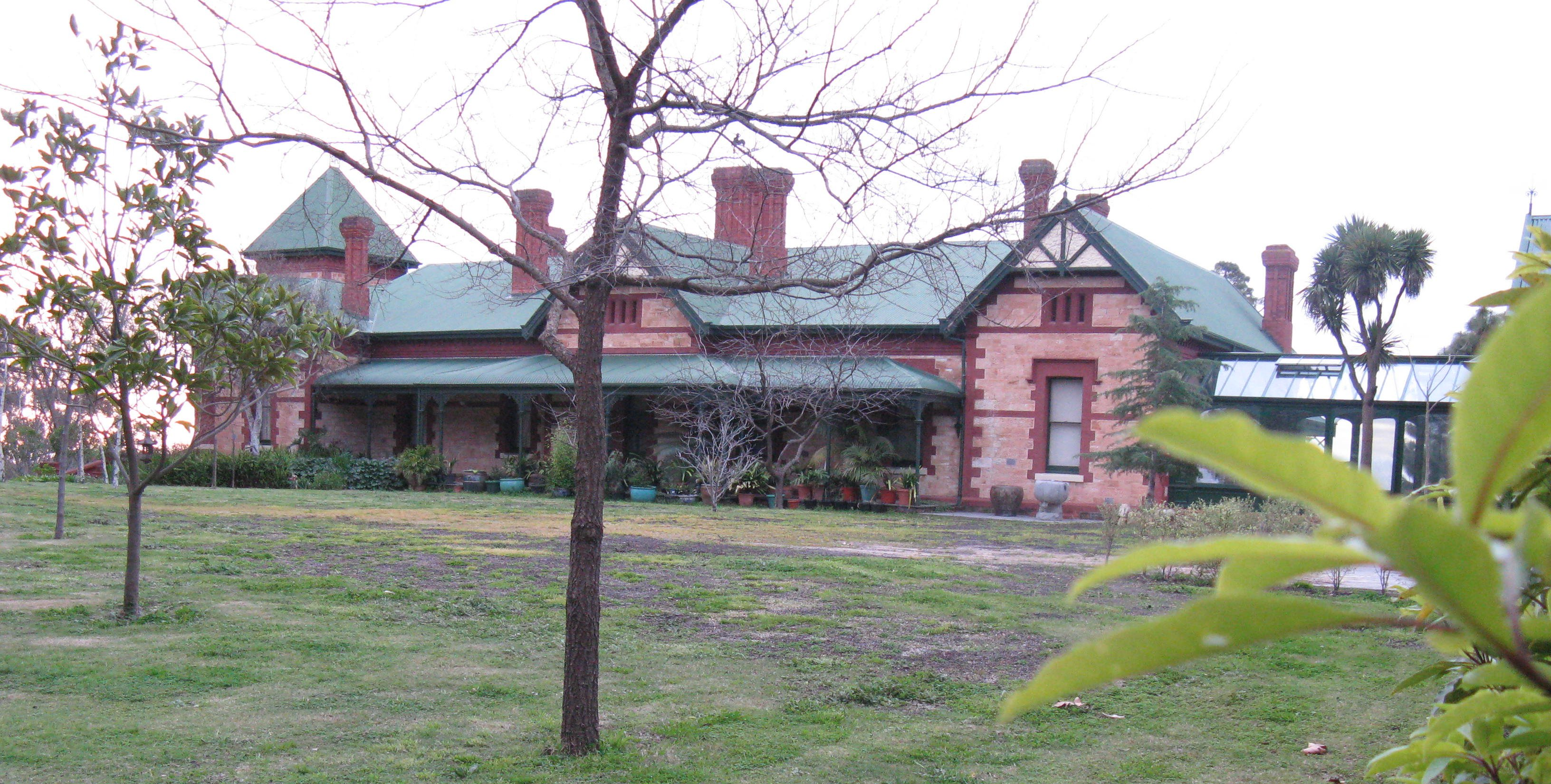
Front (South face)

== Birralee, Glenelg ==
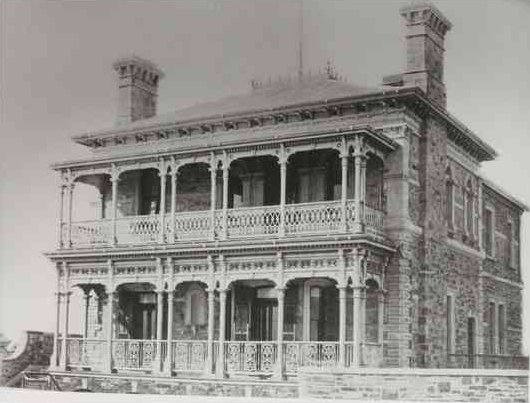
"Birralee" (Glenelg) ca.1890

It is not clear when the house was built, or who built it. Burford lived at Birralee, Glenelg at least until the turn of the century.

Eldest daughter Lilian May married Thomas, eldest son of Thos. Eyres Esq. of Perth, W.A. "on 13th October 1899 at the residence of the bride's parents, Birralee, Glenelg".

The notice for the wedding on 11 November 1914 (also the Burford's 47th wedding anniversary) of youngest daughter "Allie Marian" to Octavius Cyril Beale, eighth son of Mr and the late Mrs Beale of "Llanarth", Burwood, NSW, mentions "Mr. and Mrs. William Burford of Birralee, Glenelg". Alice Mary died only 11 years later "at her home Birralee, Belair".

The notice for the wedding on 11 November 1918 (also the Burford's 51st wedding anniversary) of second daughter Evaline to "Sergeant Horace Cansfield, third son of Mr. Thomas Park, West Bridgford, Nottingham, England", is dated 15 January 1919, and mentions "Mr. and Mrs. Wm. Burford of Birralee, Albert Terrace, Glenelg".

After his wife's death, Burford sold the Glenelg beachfront mansion "Birralee", at 16 Albert Tce (now "Broadway") on the corner of "Seawall", (now called "The Esplanade"), in September 1921. The property had been mostly used by Mrs. Burford and her daughters. The sale notice suggests that the house would not remain intact; it is not clear when the house was demolished.
