= Levers Pacific Plantations =

British company

Levers Pacific Plantations Ltd.
- Type: Subsidiary
- Industry: Plantation agriculture
- Founded: 1902
- Founder: William Lever
- Headquarters: London, England
- Key people: G. Foulton (general manager)
- Products: Copra
- Parent: Lever Brothers

Levers Pacific Plantations Ltd. was a British company, incorporated by William Lever in London in 1902, as a subsidiary of Lever Brothers, which wanted to get more control over raw materials for its soap, such as copra, mainly for the Lever Brothers Factory in Sydney. The first general manager was G. Foulton, who was based in Sydney. In 1903, the British government granted the company access to copra and phosphate reserves in the Pacific.

In 1903, Levers Pacific Plantations Limited purchased 50,000 acres of coconut plantations from Norwegian trader Lars Nielsen in the British Solomon Islands for £6,500, and in 1906 the company purchased the coconut plantation concessions in the Solomon Islands from the Pacific Islands Company Ltd for £5,000. By 1905 the company had acquired approximately 80,000 acres in the Solomon Islands which were distributed over 14 islands: 51,000 acres from Lars Nielsen and other plantation owners, and 28,870 acres purchased from islanders.

By 1905, Levers Pacific plantations were shipping 13,000 tons of copra yearly to the Lever Brothers Ltd factory in Sydney for processing into the raw material for soap manufacture and for the supply of butter fat to customers.

By 1911, the company had purchased or leased a total of 218,820 acres in the western and central Solomons, although the company did not develop and plant coconut palms on all the land they acquired. The company came into conflict with Charles Morris Woodford, the Resident Commissioner in the Solomon Islands, over his management of land alienation from the Solomon Islanders to plantation owners. The complaints included Woodford withdrawing ‘waste lands’ from transfer to plantation owners when the original Solomon Islander owners were identified, and his insisting on strict conformity with the improvement clauses on leases. The Solomons (Land) Regulation of 1914 (King's Regulation no. 3 of 1914), replace earlier regulations, and ended the alienation of land from Solomon Islander owners and a leasehold system was instituted for plantation land.
