= Carbolic =

Carbolic may refer to:

- Phenol, also known as carbolic acid
- Carbolic soap, a type of soap containing carbolic acid

== See also ==
- Carlill v Carbolic Smoke Ball Company
