= Walker Brothers (soap) =

Soap manufacturers

Walker Brothers was a pioneer soap manufacturer in the British colony of South Australia.

== History ==
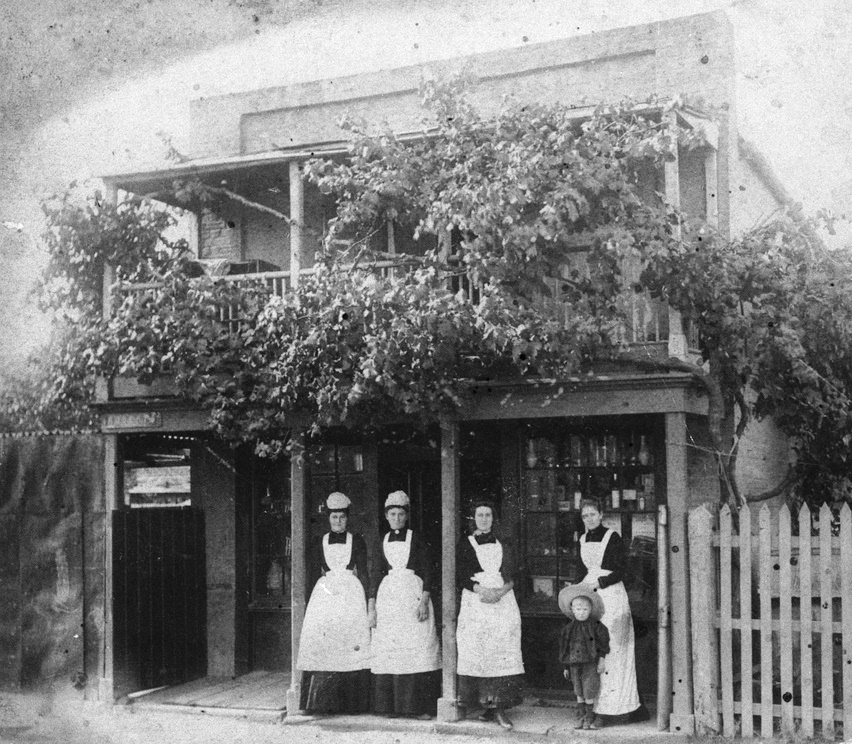
Walker family home, corner Wakefield and Robert streets, Acre 347, Adelaide; previously Walker's Fountain Inn

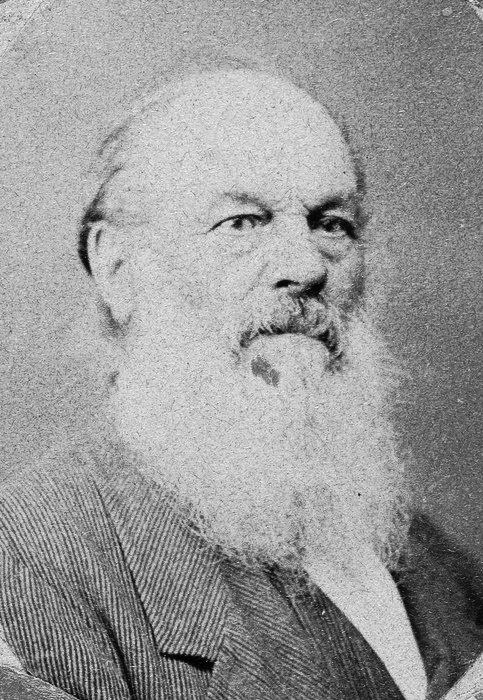
Thomas Moody Walker (1801–1878)

Thomas Moody Walker (c. 1801 – 22 March 1878) and his wife Mary Ann Walker, née Lamb, (c. 1813 – 15 April 1900) of Lincolnshire, England, emigrated to South Australia with their three children aboard Lord Goderich, arriving in April 1838.

He founded a candle factory in Wakefield Street, Adelaide (between Acland and Robert streets, neither now in existence) in 1840 and by 1841 was producing enough to advertise his wares, and was making soap a few months later, the first in the field, though Burford's was making candles a few months earlier. At the Exhibition of 1845 his soaps were praised by the judges as comparable in quality to those of English manufacturer Paton and Charles, while those of Wright & Linn's Hindmarsh Soap Manufactory and W. H. Burfords were barely inferior. His candles and Burford's, however, were not rated as highly as those of A. H. Davis of Moore Farm. The judges opined that future importation of both soap and candles would be not only needless but unprofitable.

In 1847 he gained a wine and beer licence for the Fountain Inn, on his property, adjacent to the factory, but after three years allowed it to lapse and converted the place for his private use.

By 1876 the company was being managed by the brothers Thomas Moody Walker, jnr, and Frederick Charles Walker; weekly production of candles was around 2,000 pounds (900 kg).

The firm prospered, and plans were put to the Woodville Council for a new factory to be built at Ridleyton, but were resisted by nearby residents, especially Croydon, which had become a popular middle-class suburb, and quite reasonably anticipated a continual nuisance smell from such a factory.

Frederick Charles Walker retired from the business in 1880, leaving Thomas Moody Walker, jnr, in sole charge.

== Other interests ==
T. M. Moody was an adherent of the Order of Oddfellows for sixty years and held a high position in the Society.

== Family ==
Thomas Moody Walker (6 May 1800 – 22 March 1878) married Mary Ann Lamb (1813 – 15 April 1900) in Boston, Lincolnshire, arrived in South Australia in April 1838. Among their children were:

- Elizabeth Ann Walker (c. 1832 – ) married John Rivers Lunniss in 1848.
- William Henry Walker (c. 1833 – 19 March 1903) married Charlotte Caroline Stocker on 2 April 1866.
- Mary Lamb Walker (c. 1836 – 17 March 1886) married George Miller Newman ( – 1859) in 1854
- Frances Chapman Walker (27 September 1840 – ) married George Hughes ( – ) on 6 October 1861
- Lucy Allanby Walker (c. 1841 – 10 January 1930) married Benjamin Watson ( – 14 January 1905) in 1863
- Thomas Moody Walker (1843 – 12 September 1926) married Alice Emery (1848 – 26 May 1930) in 1866

- Emma May Walker (1872 – 1965) married publican John Birchmore in 1901

- Frederick Charles Walker (1852 – ) married Emma Georgina Alley ( – ) on 9 April 1874

== See also ==
Some other soap and candle makers of colonial South Australia

- W. H. Burford & Sons
- Crompton and Sons
- J. H. M. Hawkes
- J. Tidmarsh & Co.
