= Alexander Petrie Campbell =

Australian-born Congregational church minister

The Reverend Alexander Petrie Campbell OBE (4 June 1881 - 13 December 1963) was an Australian-born Congregational church minister and chairman of the Congregational Union of Australia and New Zealand from 1937 until 1939.

== Immediate family ==
Alex Campbell was born at Redfern, New South Wales, the second son of George Campbell, an English-born Congregational minister. Before entering the ministry, George was a Moulder Journeyman, the occupation he gave at the time of his first marriage to Ann Hamilton. They were married in 1856, but she died without bearing any children in 1865. George went on to marry Mary Adam Petrie, Alexander's mother, in 1872. She was born in Paisley, Scotland. Both parents were 43 years of age at the time of Alex's birth. George and Mary were married for 30 years before Mary died in 1903. George died in 1915.

Alex's brother George was older by just one year. He later worked as a Chemist, living in Petersham, Sydney with his wife.

== Early life ==
He was educated at Newington College (1891–1901) and the University of Sydney from where he graduated as a Bachelor of Arts in 1904. After studying theology at Camden College, Glebe, he was ordained in his father's church at Burwood. Campbell married Margaret Elizabeth Beale, daughter of piano manufacturer Octavius Beale, in 1909.

== Ministry ==
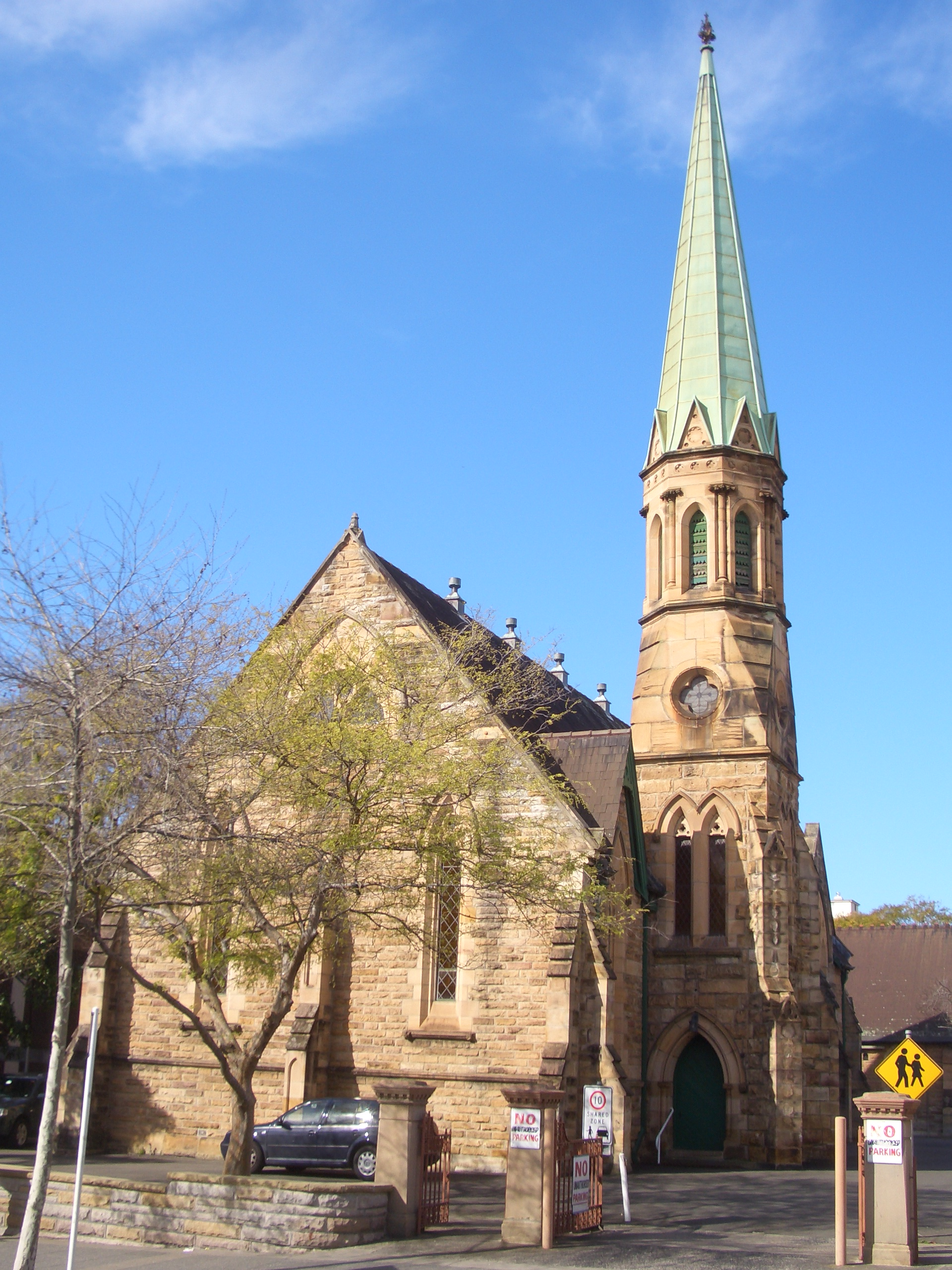
Burwood Congregational Church (now Uniting) where Campbell was ordained and served as minister 1938–1944.

- Minister, Hunters Hill Congregational Church, 1905 to 1911
- Minister, Killara Congregational Church, 1911 to 1938
- Chairman, Congregational Union of New South Wales, 1919
- Secretary, Camden College, 1920 to 1921
- President, Camden College, 1937 to 1955
- Minister, Burwood Congregational Church, 1938 to 1944
- Moderator, Congregational Union of New South Wales, 1944 to 1951
- President, Sydney City Mission, 1946 to 1963

== Later life ==
Campbell's deep concern for social justice led him to serve the community at large. In 1929 he was elected president of the Rotary Club of Sydney and he became vice-president of the New South Wales Society for Crippled Children which had been established during his presidency of Rotary. With a pleasant voice, Campbell was a regular speaker on radio and he was an early proponent of Australian intercommunion. Congregationalists in New South Wales "revered him as an inspiring preacher, a wise administrator and a beloved pastor". He died at Wahroonga and was survived by his wife, daughter and three sons.

== Honours ==
- Appointed an Officer of the Order of the British Empire, 1962
- Mission Australia's Campbell House Surry Hills, named in his honour, 1973

== Publications ==
- Edited the New South Wales Congregationalist
- Wrote The Great Hill-Climb (1930) and A Word for the Road (1953)

== Bibliography ==
- Sydney Morning Herald, Obituary (3 Dec 1963)
- Birth certificate (certified copy): Alexander Campbell
- Death certificate (certified copy): George Campbell
- Marriage certificate (certified copy): George and Ann Campbell
- Marriage certificate (copy): George and Mary Campbell
- J. Garrett and L. W. Farr, Camden College (Syd, 1964)
- J. Owen, The Heart of the City (Syd, 1987)
- P. Swain, Newington Across the Years 1863-1998 (Syd, 1999)
