= Carbolic soap =

Type of soap with mild antiseptic effect

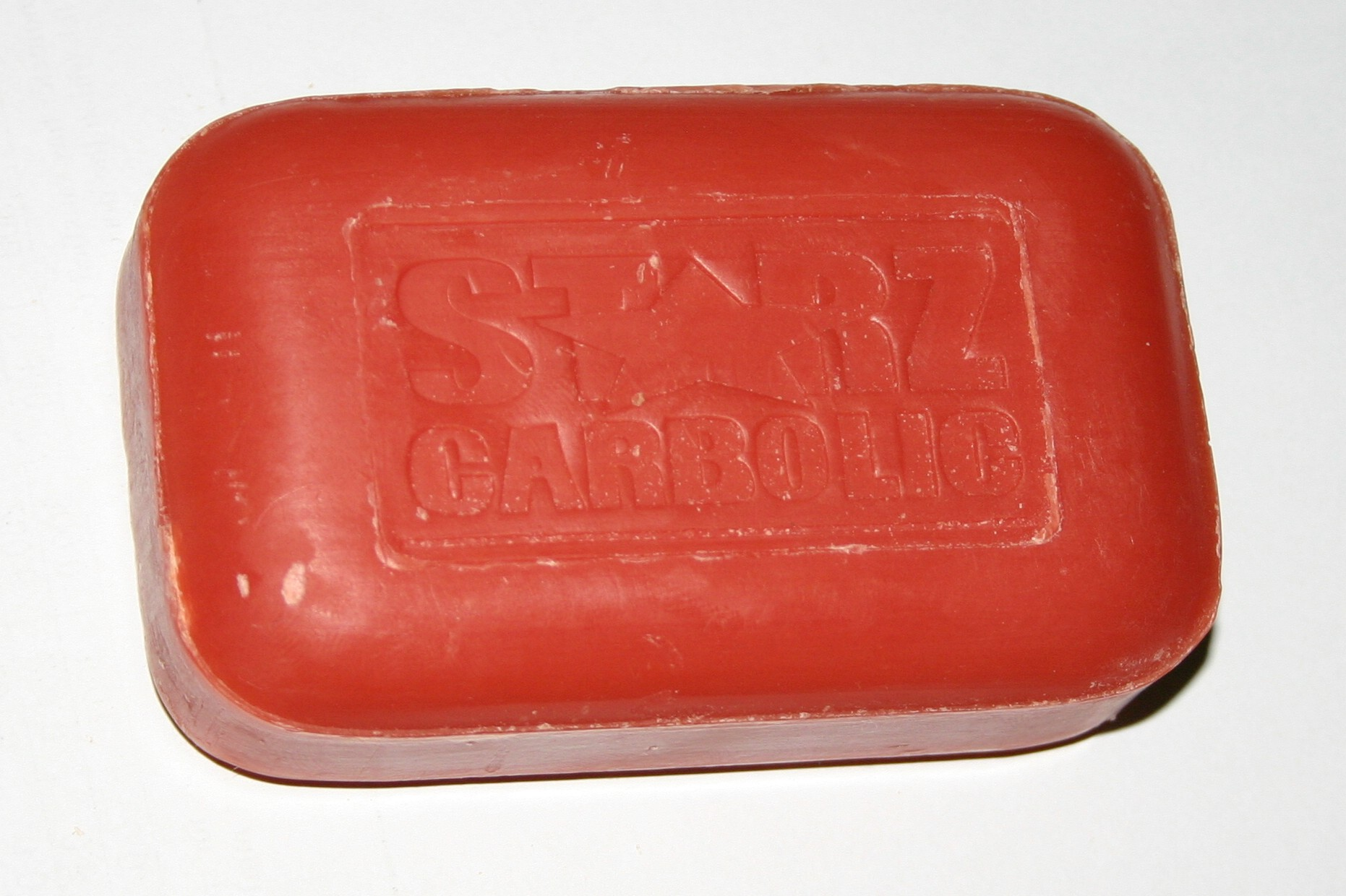
Bar of carbolic soap, demonstrating the rich red colour that gives the soap its alternative name, red soap

Carbolic soap, sometimes referred to as red soap, is a mildly antiseptic soap containing carbolic acid (phenol) and/or cresylic acid (cresol), both of which are phenols derived from either coal tar or petroleum sources.

== History ==
In 1834, German chemist Friedlieb Ferdinand Runge discovered a phenol, also known as carbolic acid, which he derived in an impure form from coal tar.

Its disinfecting and anti-putrescent properties were known by 1859. In 1860, Alexander McDougall (or M'Dougall) obtained a U.K. patent for a sheep dip, in which phenol was combined with an alkali and some fatty substance, in effect creating a carbolic soap.

F. C. Calvert and Company of Manchester, England, was established in 1859 as a manufacturer of pure crystalline phenol. By 1863, phenol was being used topically for treatment of skin diseases and ulcers by medical practitioners in the UK.

Calvert established himself as a major supplier of phenol in the UK by 1866, and played a significant role in popularization of the chemical compound.

In August 1865, Joseph Lister applied a piece of lint dipped in carbolic acid solution to the wound of an eleven-year-old boy at Glasgow Royal Infirmary, who had sustained a compound fracture after a cart wheel had passed over his leg. After four days, he renewed the pad and discovered that no infection had developed, and after a total of six weeks he was amazed to discover that the boy's bones had fused back together, without the danger of suppuration. His discovery was published in The Lancet in 1867. This contributed to a rapid introduction of carbolic acid in medical and surgical practice. At first, M'Dougall brothers were the only manufacturers of carbolic soap in the UK. Calvert Company introduced its own version of carbolic soap in 1868-69.

In the United States, the licence for manufacturing carbolic soap was held by James Buchan and Company. In 1894, William Lever, 1st Viscount Leverhulme, introduced the Lifebuoy brand of carbolic soap to the market.

== Features ==
One of the distinctive features of this soap is its deep pink to red colour, which was and still is added to the soap to designate it as carbolic soap. The addition of the red colour was deemed important as when carbolic soap was first introduced to the general public it was the only germicidal soap available. Carbolic acid is used in a wide range of industrial and consumer product applications and can be a skin irritant.

== Uses ==
It is still distributed to disaster victims for routine hygiene by the Red Cross and other relief organisations.

== See also ==
- List of cleaning products
- Wright's Coal Tar Soap
