= Octavius Beale =

Irish piano maker (1850–1930)

Octavius Charles Beale (23 February 1850 – 16 December 1930) was an Irish-born Australian piano manufacturer and a philanthropist.

Beale formed a company to import sewing machines and pianos in 1879, after which he established Australia's first piano factory in Annandale, 1893. The factory ceased production in 1975.

He served as president of the New South Wales Chamber of Commerce and a trustee of the Australian Museum, and the Bank of New South Wales (Westpac).

In 1903, Beale was appointed one of twelve members of a Royal Commission into the decline of the birth rate in New South Wales. He later conducted, at his own expense, a Royal Commission of Inquiry into Secret Drugs, 1905-1910. The two-volume report records the criminal unscrupulousness of manufacturers and advertisers.

== Marriage and family ==
Beale married Elizabeth (Lilly) Baily (1856 – 1901) at the Congregational Church, Woollahra, New South Wales, and they had twelve children. After Lily's death he married her sister Katherine on 4 March 1903. The children from the first marriage were:

- Margaret Elizabeth (Mado) (1875–1964)
  Margaret married the Rev A.P. Campbell OBE (1881–1963), a Congregational church minister and chairman of the Congregational Union of Australia and New Zealand from 1937 until 1939. They had a daughter and three sons.
- Lionel Charles (1877–1961)
- Ruth Beale (1879–1964)
- Reginald Hugo (1880–1924)
- Ronald Matheson (1882–1966)
- Edgar Francis (1884–1918)
- Rupert Octavius (1887–1957)
- Harold Strangman Beale (1889–1936)
  Harold was educated at Newington College commencing in 1904.
- Octavius Cyril Beale (1891–1969)
  Cyril was educated at Newington College commencing in 1904. He was a Gunner in the 2nd Field Artillery Brigade serving during WWI from February until August 1917. He married Alice Gertrude Marion Burford (1886–1925) on 11 November 1914. She was a daughter of William Burford of Adelaide.
- Dr Hector Llewellyn Beale (1892–1959)
  Hector was educated at Newington College commencing in 1904. He graduated MB ChM from the University of Sydney in 1916. He was a medical officer serving during WWI from 1917 until January 1919. He married Florence Henderson in Aberdeen.
- Hilda Dorothea Beale (1896–1970) married Reginald Thomas Lamble on 11 March 1924.
- Mary Patricia Beale (1898–1972)

On his death in a motor vehicle accident in Stroud, New South Wales, Beale was survived by his second wife and ten of his 12 children.

== See also ==
- Beale Piano
