= Wright's Coal Tar Soap =

Brand of antiseptic soap

Wright's Traditional Soap logo

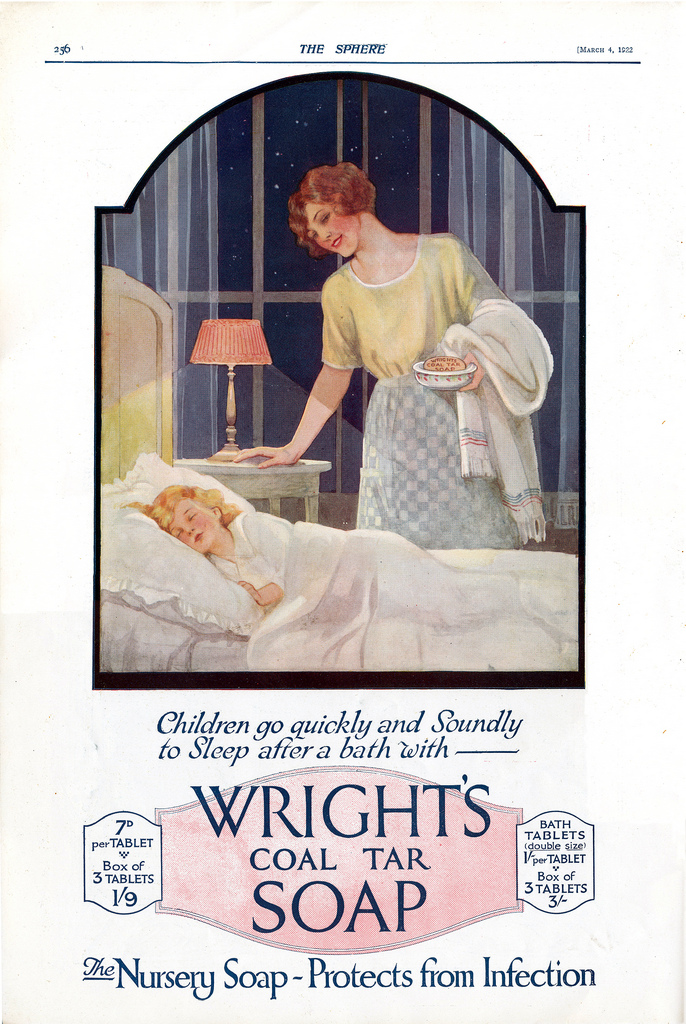
1922 magazine advert

Wright's Coal Tar Soap was a British brand of antiseptic soap. It was developed by William Valentine Wright in 1860 using coal tar, for treating skin diseases.

Following a 2009 European Union directive on the use of coal tar in cosmetics, the soap was discontinued and replaced by Wright's Traditional Soap. This substituted the coal tar with tea tree oil for its antibacterial properties, and retained the look and smell of the original.

== History ==
=== Wright, Sellers & Layman ===
William Valentine Wright, born in 1826 in Aldeburgh, Suffolk, was a wholesale druggist and chemist who had a small business, W.V. Wright & Co. at 11 Old Fish Street Hill, Doctors' Commons, London. Now non-existent, Old Fish Street Hill southeast of St Paul's Cathedral was the 14th-century fish market before Billingsgate. Wright's business can be traced back to James Curtis & Co., a wholesale druggist at these premises since 1795.

W.V. Wright & Co.'s coal-tar soap was first sold in 1860. It was initially named Sapo Carbonis Detergens, a registered trademark.

By 1875 Wright had taken John Sellers and Frederick Noel Layman (1841–1910) into partnership; in 1876 John Sellers retired. In 1867, Wright moved his firm, Wright, Sellers & Layman, to small (one-third acre) premises at 50 Southwark Street, Southwark, London. This area of London was already the location for glue factories and tanneries.

=== Wright, Layman & Umney ===
When Sellers retired, Charles Umney (1843–1916) joined the partnership in 1876. The company's name was changed to Wright, Layman & Umney, "Wholesale and export druggists, manufacturers of pharmaceutical and chemical preparations, distillers of essential oils, manufacturers and proprietors of Wright's Coal Tar Soap and other coal tar specialities." The company soon needed to lease adjoining premises, and in quick succession, numbers 44, 46, and 48 were added to the original warehouse at Southwark Street.

==== 1877: Wright dies ====
Wright died in Dundee in September 1877 at the age of 51. He had erysipelas and the inflammation extending to the brain. Erysipelas is an acute infection of the skin and underlying fat tissues, usually caused by the streptococcus bacteria.

Two of his sons, Charles Foster, born 1859, and Herbert Cassin, born 1863, in Clapham, Surrey, followed their father into the wholesale drug trade. Herbert remained on the board of directors into the 20th century. The eldest son, William Valentine Jr., born 1854, listed his occupation as "gentleman", while the youngest son, Sydney Faulconer, became a physician and surgeon.

==== 1892: Charles Booth interview ====
In 1892, as part of a survey into life and labour in London, the social researcher Charles Booth interviewed Charles Umney. The original record is in the archives of the British Library of Political and Economic Science:

Mr Charles Umney of Wright, Layman, Umney 50 Southwark Street, S.E. Manufacturing Druggists. Employ 68 hands, Wages pw: 27/- to 32/- employment perfectly regular – the busiest months being Jan. Feb. and March, when there is most illness about. Everything turned out by a manufacturing druggist has to be supervised with the greatest care, as the retail chemist is never generally blamed for mistakes in prescriptions. The original sin may lie at the door of the manufacturer – for this reason over every department is placed an expert, a man who has passed examinations in chemistry, under the Pharmaceutical Society, & who is absolutely responsible for the smallest product of his shop. During the 18 years of Mr Umney's experience two mistakes only had occurred. It is to the interest of this manufacturer to take all pains possible to avoid such accidents, as he may at any time be called upon to pay heavy damages should an accident occur. The raw drugs are exposed for sale once a week at some place near the docks. London used formerly to be the drug market of the world, but of late years other cities have attracted a part of this business, especially Antwerp, Amsterdam & New York. It is practically necessary to examine every bale before buying, & not be content with samples, as the greatest deceptions are sometimes practised. The chemicals are obtained from various parts of the country from chemical manufacturers – and are made up into drugs on the premises. Mr Umney was very bouttoné – I was not taken over his factory. There are 7 or 8 manufacturing druggists in London & the number of actual workpeople employed would not amount to more than a few hundred."

=== Park Street ===
With an increasingly acute accommodation shortage at the Southwark Street premises, the drug laboratories and soap factory were moved north to 66–76 Park Street, Southwark, in 1899. The factory was enlarged in 1920.

During the 1930s, the company bought the old business of Dakin Brothers in Middlesex Street.

In 1942, additional factory premises were built at 66 Park Street, and in 1950, a new warehouse was constructed at Southwark Street. By then, the total floor space was two and one-third acres.

== Limited company ==
In June 1899, Wright, Layman & Umney became a private limited company with a capital of £100,000 and Charles Umney as director. Charles maintained an active role in the business until 1905 and subsequently acted as chairman of the company.

In due course, Charles' sons, Ernest Albert Umney and John Charles Umney, joined the firm, and Percy Umney became the company solicitor. By 1898, John Charles Umney had taken over the management of the Coal Tar Soap section of the business.

Readers of the Country-Side magazine in 1906 were offered the chance to buy an inexpensive cabinet frame for one shilling, in which they could stack twelve empty Wright's Coal Tar Soap packets to act as sliding drawers in a cabinet for natural history specimens. As the editorial mentioned: "the measurements have been chosen because so many of our readers are users of Wright's Coal Tar Soap". Wright's Coal Tar Soap was a regular advertiser in the magazine.

=== Public limited company ===
By 1909, the company became a public limited company with a capital of £135,000, and Charles Umney was chair of the board of directors. The other directors were Charles Noel Layman (who died in 1909), Ernest Blakesley Layman, Herbert Cassin Wright, John Charles Umney, Frederick Noel Layman, and Ernest Albert Umney. Percy Umney was the company solicitor, and Ernest Albert Umney later became chairman of the company.

During the first year of trading as a public limited company, the product range was enlarged to include Wright's Coal Tar Shaving Soap in powder form.

By 1932, when a share issue of £280,000 was offered, the directors were Herbert Cassin Wright (chairman), Ernest Albert Umney (vice-chairman), Ernest Blakesley Layman, James Knight, James Hamerton, and Reginald Edward Conder.

=== Hampshire Museum ===
Hampshire Museum has four "Coal Tar Vaporizers" made by Wright, Layman & Umney in the early 20th century, and some bill-heads (invoices) which were sent to one of their customers, Messrs. Charles Mumby & Co, lemonade manufacturers of Gosport.

=== Wright Layman & Umney Ltd v Wright ===
In 1949, the company sued a trader who used a similar name. In Wright Layman & Umney Ltd v Wright, 1949, the rule was stated as

If a man uses his own name, and uses it honestly and fairly, and is doing nothing more, he cannot be restrained, even if confusion results.

However,

once he oversteps the line and confusion results or is calculated to result, the fact that he is using something approaching his own name is no justification.

=== Takeover ===
In the late 1960s, Wright's Coal Tar Soap business was taken over by LRC Products (London International Group), which sold it to Smith & Nephew in the 1990s.

=== Lornamead ===
Wright's Traditional Soap is now made in Indonesia by multinational Lornamead, with the claim "with coal tar fragrance" appearing on the packaging. It was previously produced in Turkey by Simple Health and Beauty Ltd, part of Unilever UK Ltd.

In 2009 a European Union directives on cosmetics banned the use of coal tar in non-prescription products, resulting in the removal of coal tar derivatives from the formula and replacement with tea tree oil as the main antibacterial ingredient. The product retains the look and smell of the original product, presented in the same packaging as Wright's Coal Tar soap, but with the wording altered to "Traditional Soap".
