= Lifebuoy (soap) =

Brand of soap

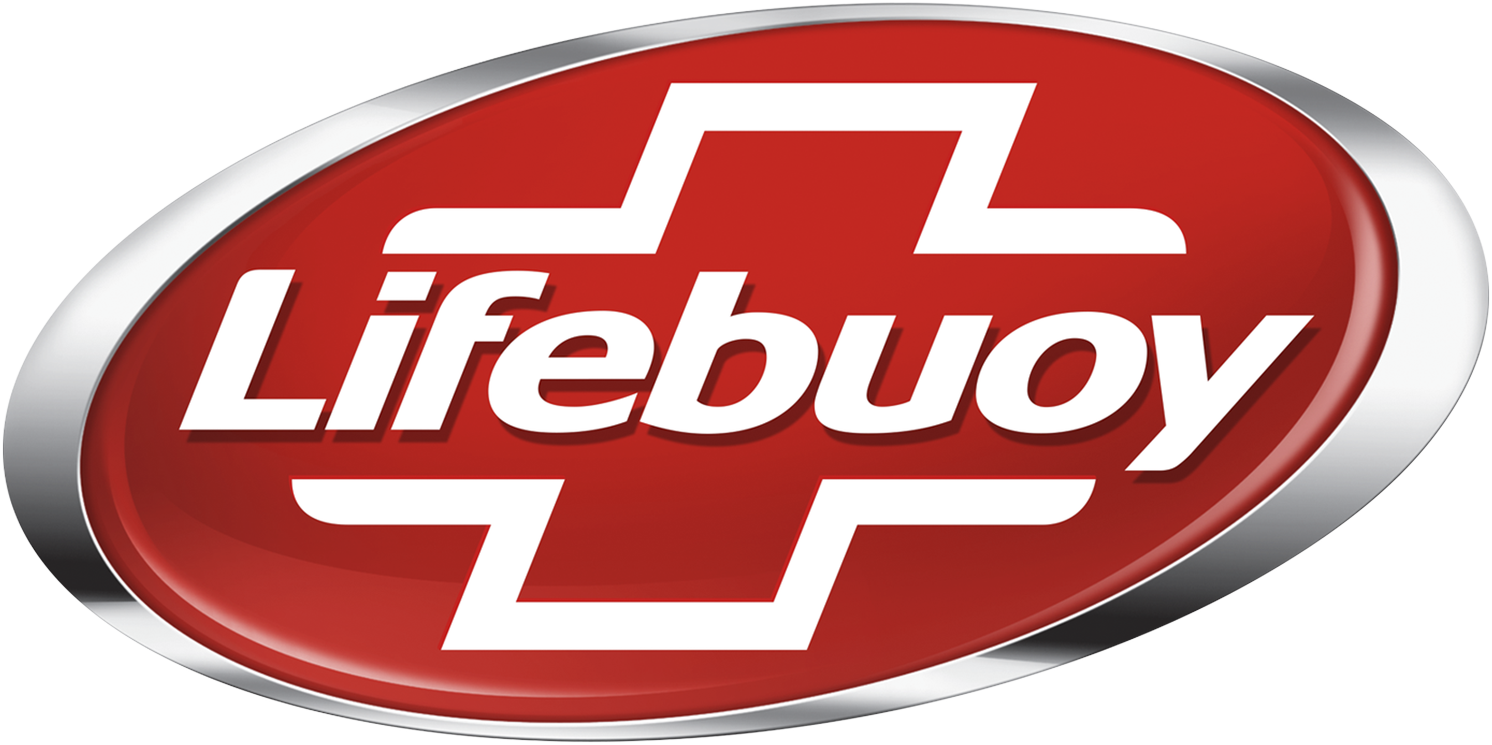
- Product type: Soap
- Current owner: Unilever
- Country: United Kingdom
- Introduced: 1895; 131 years ago
- Markets: Worldwide
- Previous owners: Lever Brothers

Lifebuoy is a British brand of soap marketed by Unilever. Lifebuoy was originally, and for much of its history, a carbolic soap containing phenol (carbolic acid, a compound extracted from coal tar). The soaps manufactured today under the Lifebuoy brand do not contain phenol. As of 2026, there are many varieties of Lifebuoy.

== History ==
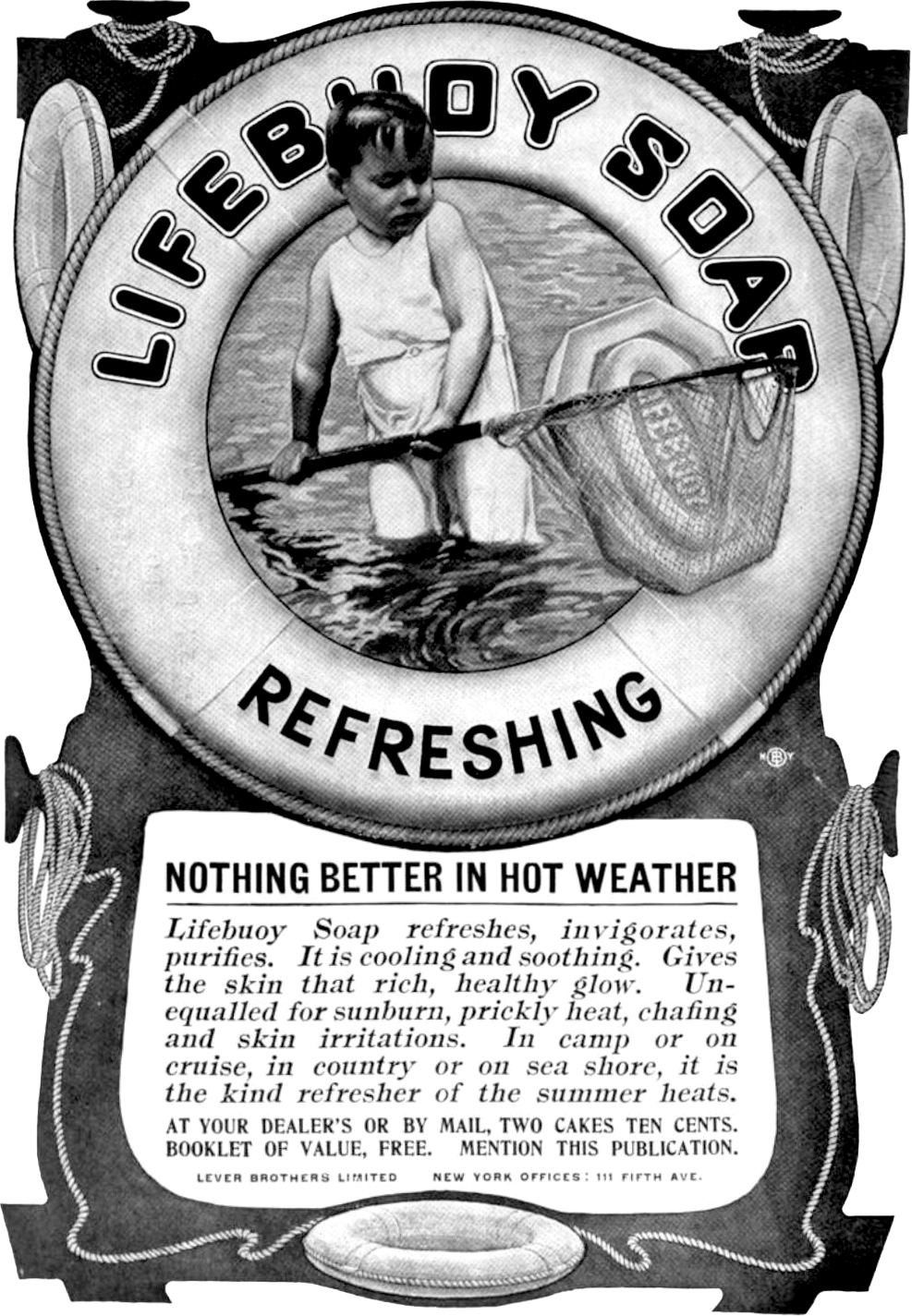
1902 ad for Lifebuoy Soap

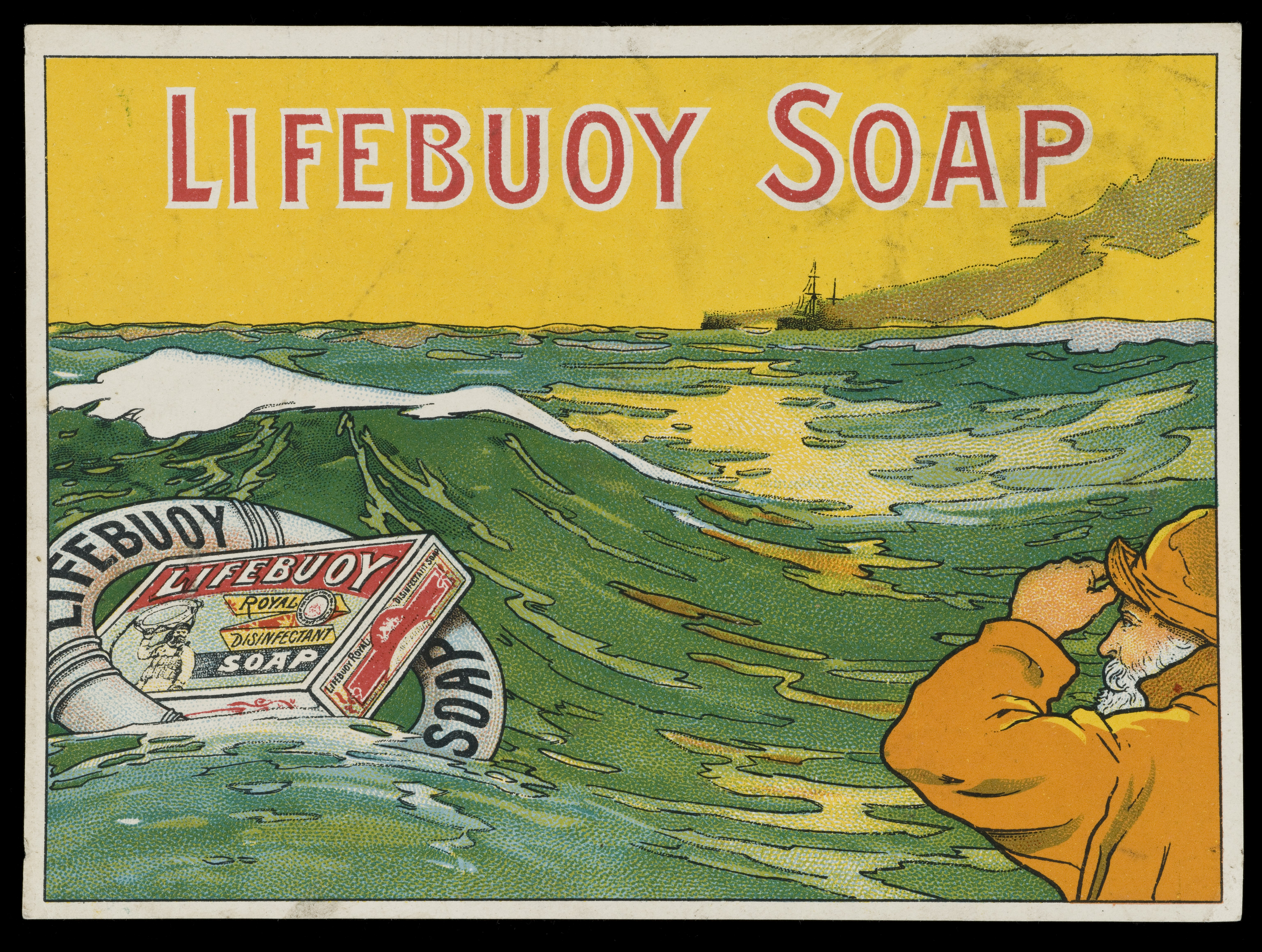
Magazine insert advertising Lifebuoy soap

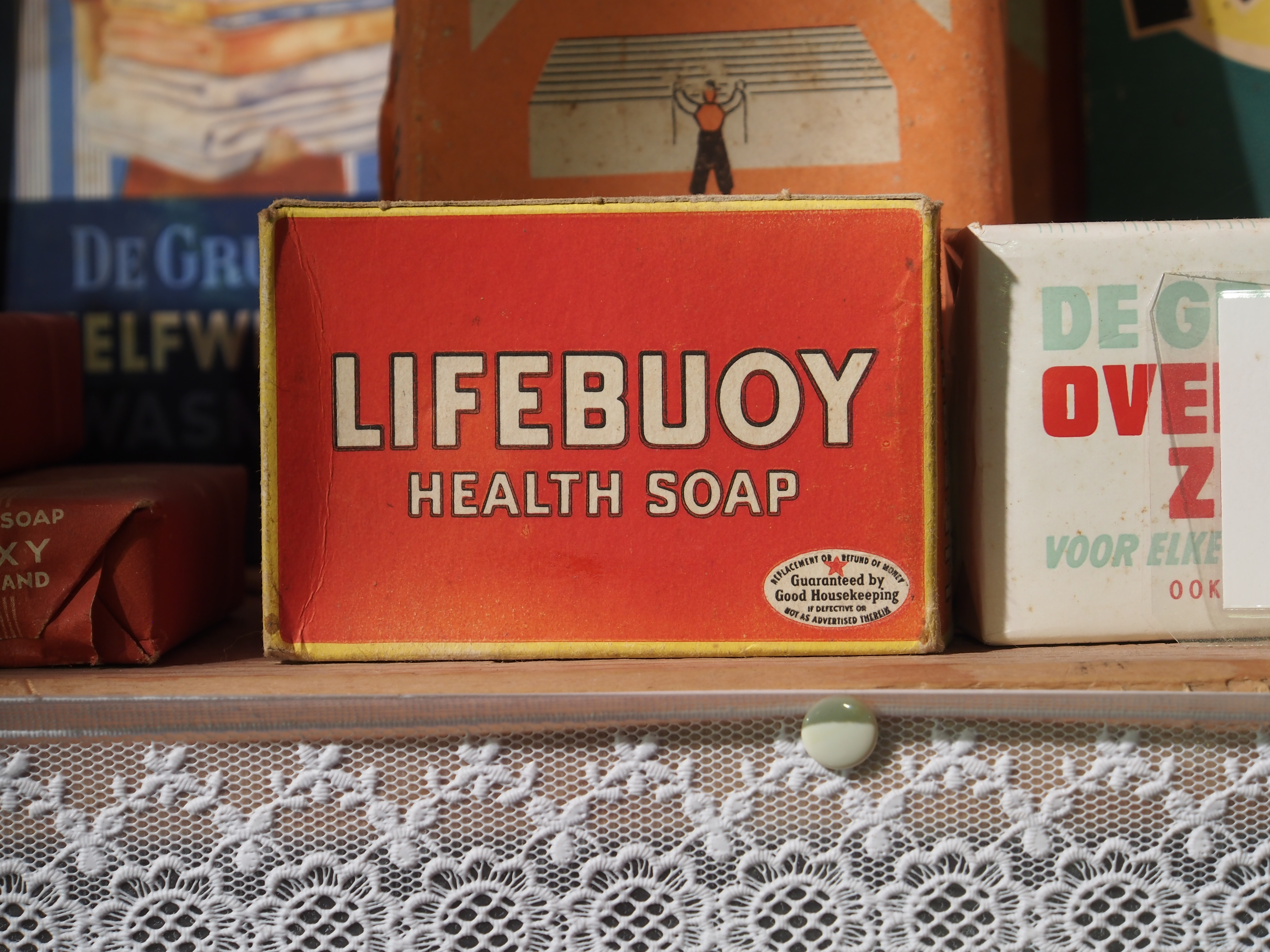
Lifebuoy Soap Packaging. Photographed at the Museum in den Halven Maen, The Netherlands

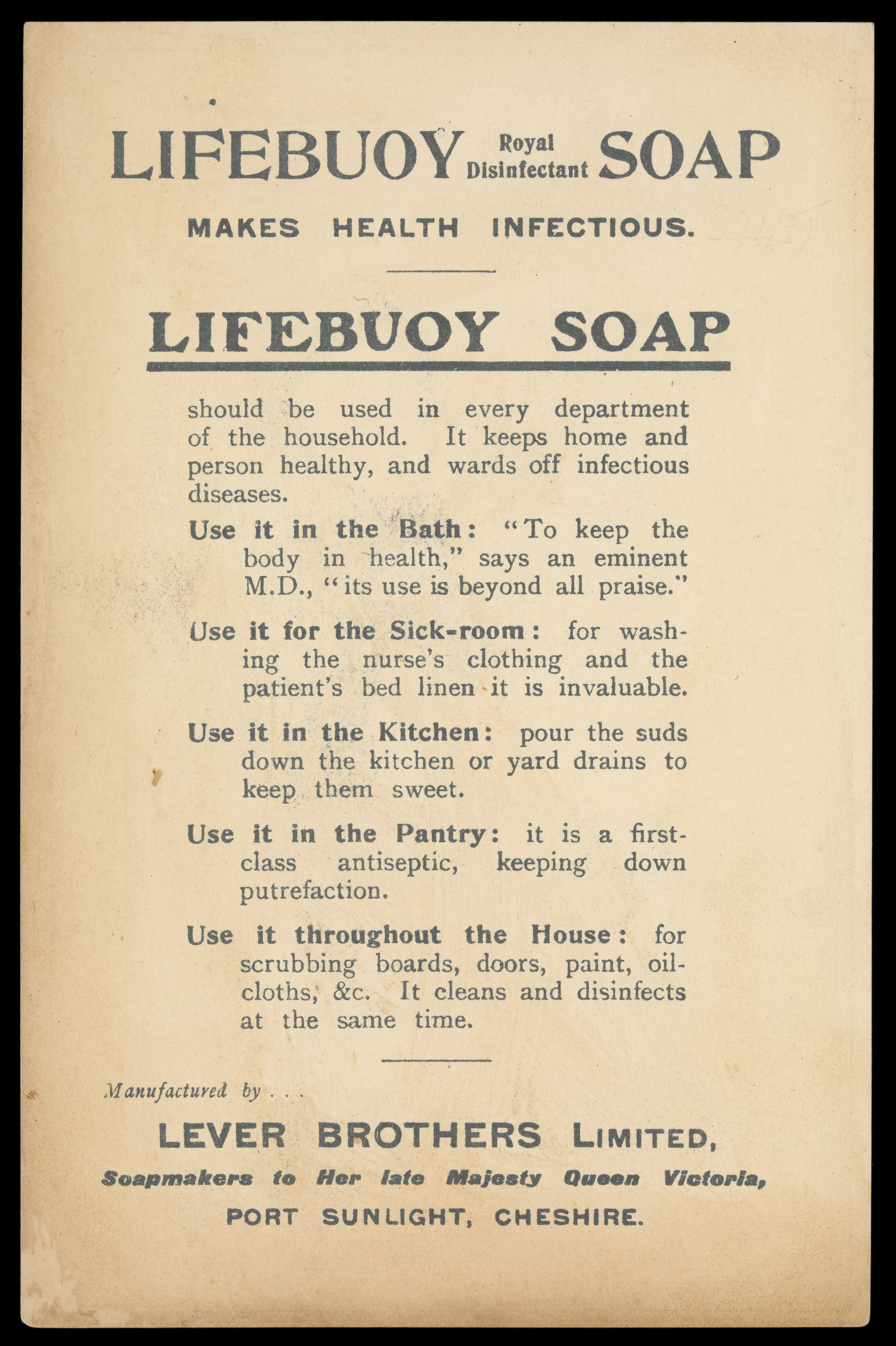
Advertising material for Lifebuoy Soap listing the product's many uses. Includes the tagline "Makes Health Infectious." The list includes the use of the product in the bath, with an endorsement by an "eminent M.D.", around the house as a general-purpose cleaner, and in the kitchen as a drain cleaner.

Lifebuoy was introduced by Lever Brothers in 1895 in the United Kingdom. Originally a carbolic soap containing phenol, different varieties were later introduced without the medicinal carbolic smell, such as the coral-coloured Lifebuoy during the late 1950s and Lifebuoy Minty Refresher in 1966. Lifebuoy was one of the most popular soaps in the United States from approximately 1923 to the mid-'50s, when perfumed soaps took over the market. It was North America's best-selling medicated/health soap until roughly 1951. It was well known for its red and yellow packaging, red color, octagonal shape, and carbolic aroma. Due to declining sales sometime in 1951 or 1952, Lever Bros. experimented with adding perfumes to the soap and made the changes permanent in 1954. Earlier experiments in 1936, 1938, 1939, and 1940 also added an artificial scent to the soap but generally lasted only one batch. Sales, however, continued to decline until 2006, when Lifebuoy was officially completely pulled from the American market. Lifebuoy's popularity reached its peak between 1932 and 1948. After World War II, when more materials were available, and rationing was over, other soaps began to take hold of the market. Its popularity waned steadily through the 1950s. It saw a popularity surge in the mid/late 1960s, which would last through 1973. This was partly caused by the introduction and success of Lifebuoy White in the American market. After this decline, the Lifebuoy brand was seen less and less in the American market. It was pulled from American shelves starting in 2003 and was completely phased out of the American market by 2006. Sometime in 2008 or 2009, Unilever released Lifebuoy Classic, a modern soap with retro packaging and a medicated scent intended to be similar to that of the 1950s product, as a tie-in novelty product sold through the official A Christmas Story website.

Although Lifebuoy is no longer produced in the US and UK, it is still being mass-produced by Unilever in Cyprus for the UK, EU (on hold and under investigation), and Brazilian markets, in Trinidad and Tobago for the Caribbean market, and in India for the Asian market. Unilever in Cyprus and Trinidad and Tobago manufactures Red Lifebuoy Soap with a carbolic fragrance, but as of 1976, it no longer contains phenol. The Lifebuoy soap manufactured in India and Indonesia for other markets, including South and South East Asia, has been updated to use red and other colours with 'modern' aromas.

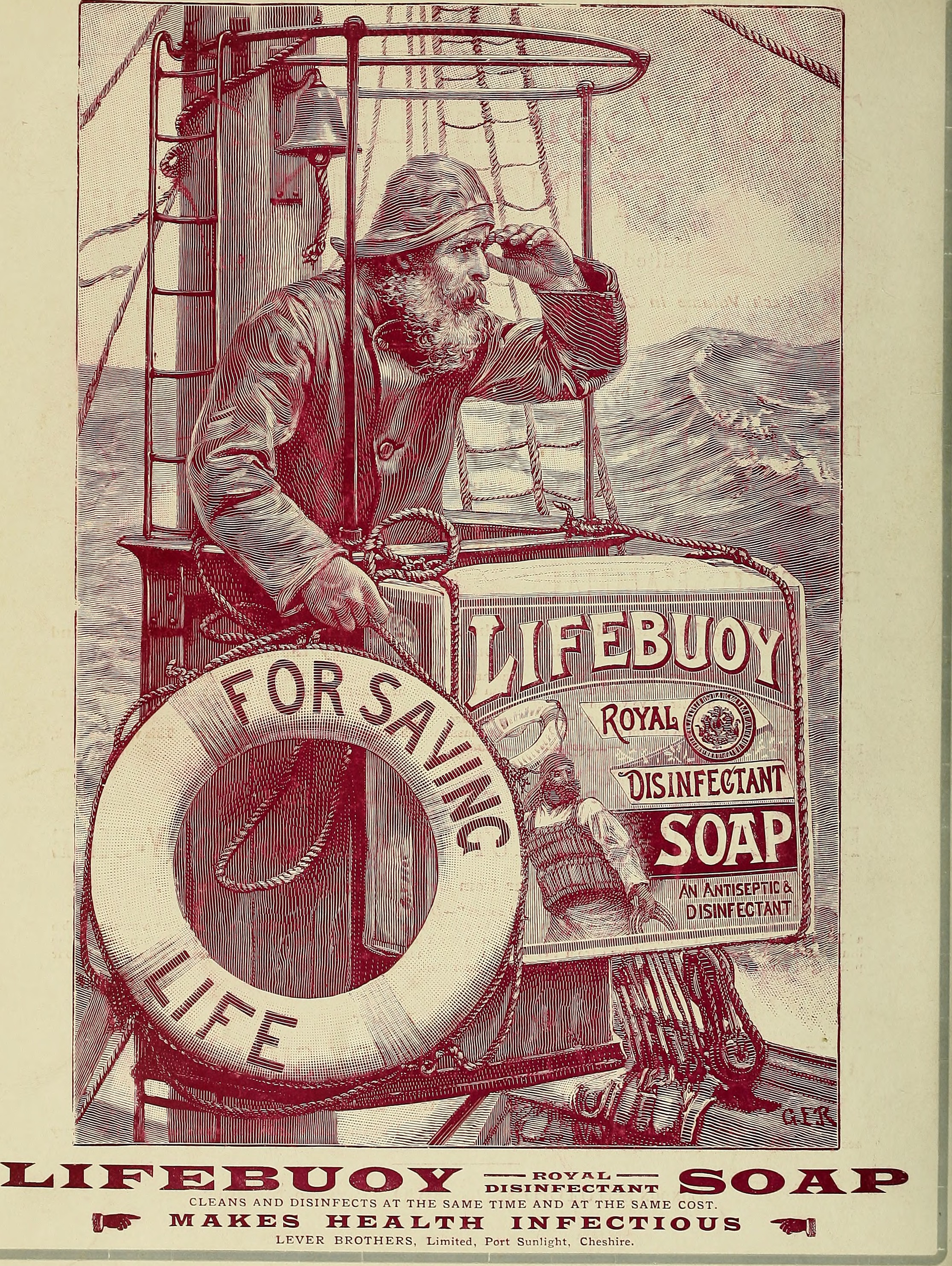
Advert for Lifebuoy Soap from Animal Life and the World of Nature; A magazine of Natural History (1903).

== References in popular culture ==
When the Philadelphia Phillies played at the Baker Bowl during the 1930s, an outfield wall advertisement for Lifebuoy stated, "The Phillies use Lifebuoy". One night in 1935, a vandal added, "And they still stink". Detractors of other losing teams employed variations of the joke.

The term "B.O.", short for "body odour", is often thought to have been invented by Lifebuoy for an advertising campaign. It was coined by a company that made deodorant for women called Odo-Ro-No in 1919, but Lifebuoy popularized it. The Lifebuoy radio ad, parodied by several Warner Brothers' Looney Tunes cartoons and MGM Cartoons, used a foghorn followed by a "B.O." sound created using a Sonovox.

During a 1969 Episode of The Tonight Show, while being bathed by two Japanese women, Johnny Carson joked, "This beats Lifebuoy and a rubber duck, doesn't it?"

In the 2016 novel Moonglow by Michael Chabon, Lifebuoy is used to signify wholesomeness and youth: "He had deposited with his brother for safekeeping a girl who smelled of Lifebuoy and library paste and retrieved a young woman who smelled of cigarettes and Ban."

It is the bar soap used in the 1983 movie A Christmas Story by the main character Ralphie and his family. After his mother uses it to wash his mouth out for swearing, Ralphie wishfully imagines a future in which he has been blinded by "soap poisoning" and reduced to begging on the street; when his family sees him, they collapse into melodramatic soap opera-like tears and his father cries out, "I told you not to use Lifebuoy!" In the film, narrator Jean Shepherd noted his disgust toward its taste, comparing it to other brands his mother had used for similar punishments.

It is used on a very obvious Product Placement, disguised as a small lesson, on personal hygiene in the 2012 Brazilian telenovela Carrossel.

== Sponsorships ==
Lifebuoy was the sponsor for the car of Dave Marcis in the NASCAR Winston Cup Series from 1987 to 1989.

In 1990, Lifebuoy sponsored the Lifebuoy Football Champions Cup held in Karachi, and between 1992 and 1994, it served as sponsor for the National Lifebuoy A-Division Football Championship of Pakistan, the nation's first ever national league format competition, bringing televised club games to Pakistan for the first time, with amounts of 35 million PKR spent in the organisations of the seasons.

Lifebuoy served as the title sponsor for the 1995 Dhaka Premier Division Football League of Bangladesh. Lifebuoy has been the shirt sponsor of the Bangladesh National Cricket Team since 2018. Lifebuoy sponsored McLaren from 2020 onwards. Lifebuoy is the main hygiene supplier for McLaren Racing.
