= Lever Brothers =

UK consumer staples company

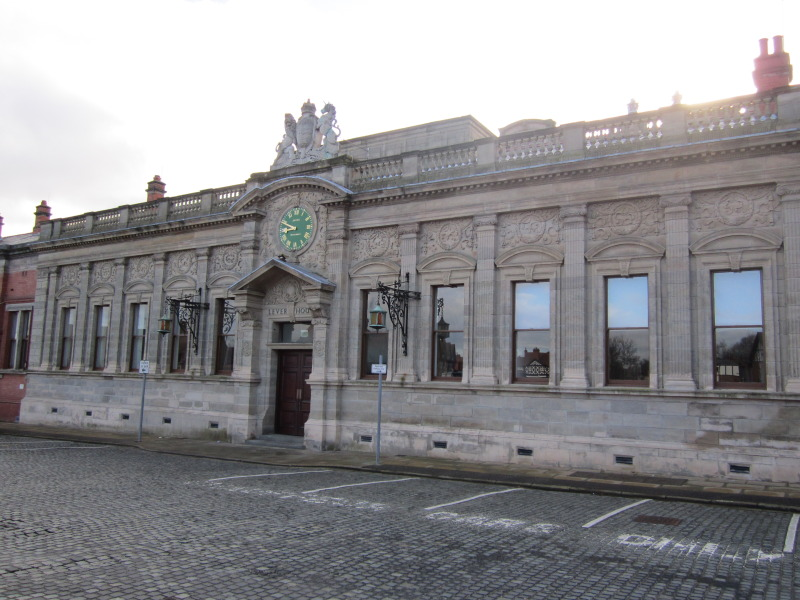
- Lever House in Port Sunlight, Wirral, Merseyside, the former headquarters of Lever Brothers
- Industry: Consumer Goods
- Founded: 21 June 1884; 142 years ago in Warrington, England
- Founders: William Hesketh Lever; James Darcy Lever
- Fate: Merged with Margarine Unie
- Successor: Unilever
- Brands: Sunlight; Lifebuoy; Lux; Vim
- Number of employees: 250,000 (1930)
- Parent: Unilever
- Subsidiaries: Curtis Davis Company; Huileries du Congo Belge; A&F Pears; Gossage's; Watson's; Crosfield's; Hazlehurst & Sons; Hudson's

Lever Brothers Limited was a British manufacturing company founded in 1885 by two brothers: William Hesketh Lever, 1st Viscount Leverhulme (1851–1925), and James Darcy Lever (1854–1916). They invested in and successfully promoted a new soap-making process invented by chemist William Hough Watson. Lever Brothers entered the United States market in 1895 and acquired Mac Fisheries, owner of T. Wall & Sons, in 1925. Its brands included Lifebuoy, Lux and Vim. Lever Brothers merged with Margarine Unie to form Unilever in 1929.

== History ==
Lever Brothers Limited was founded on 21 June 1884. Starting with a small grocery business begun by his father, William Lever and his brother James entered the soap business in 1884 by buying a small soap works in Warrington. The brothers teamed up with a Cumbrian chemist, William Hough Watson, who became an early business partner. Watson invented the process which resulted in a new soap, using glycerin and vegetable oils, such as palm oil, rather than tallow. The resulting soap was a good, free-lathering soap, at first named Honey Soap then later named Sunlight Soap. Production reached 450 tons per week by 1888. Larger premises were built on marshes at Bromborough Pool on the Wirral Peninsula at what became Port Sunlight. Though the company was named Lever Brothers, James never took a major part in running the business. He fell ill in 1895, likely as a result of diabetes, and resigned his directorship two years later.

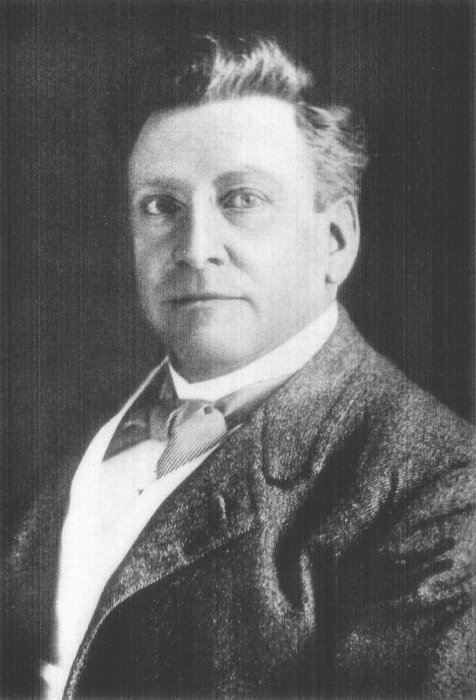
William Lever, 1st Viscount Leverhulme

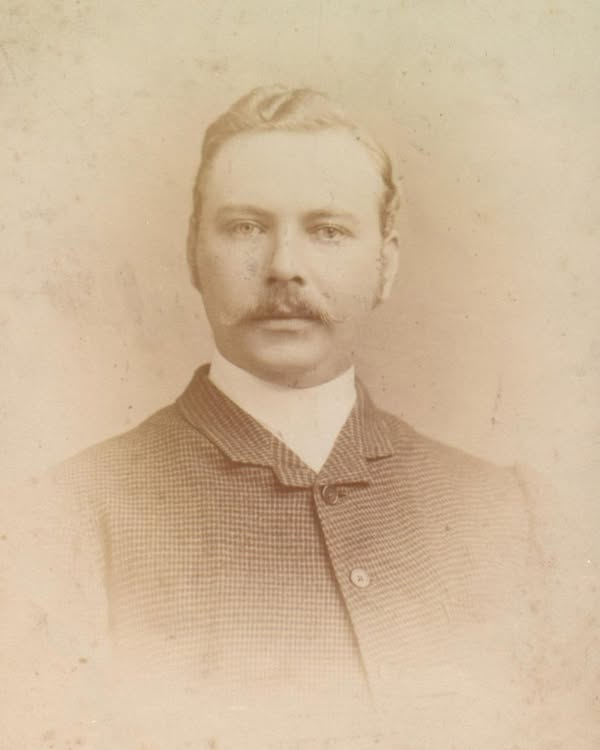
James Darcy Lever of Lever Brothers

Lever Brothers entered the United States market in 1895, with a small New York City sales office. In 1898, it bought a soap manufacturer in Cambridge, Massachusetts, the Curtis Davis Company, moved its U.S. headquarters to Cambridge and started production at a factory located at what is now Technology Square. In 1925, Lever Brothers acquired Mac Fisheries, owner of T. Wall & Sons.

The firm began to use whale oil after acquiring the Testrup hydrogenation patent in 1912. This allowed the oil to be hardened to the point where it could be used to make soap or margarine. The firm continued to use whale oil until at least 1937.

By 1929, Lever Brothers employed 1,000 workers in Cambridge, and 1,400 nationwide, making it the third-largest soap manufacturer in the U.S.

In 1949, Unilever moved its US headquarters and laboratories to Park Avenue, New York, and in 1959, it closed the Cambridge factory.

=== Treatment of employees ===
Lever Brothers was one of several British companies that took an interest in the welfare of its employees. The model village of Port Sunlight was developed between 1888 and 1914 adjoining the soap factory to accommodate the company's staff in good quality housing, with high architectural standards and many community facilities. The treatment found at Port Sunlight did not exist in the operations of its subsidiary in the Belgian Congo, where Lever Brothers, through their subsidiary Huileries du Congo Belge (HCB), utilised forced labour between 1911 and 1945.

=== Brands ===
By 1911, the company had its own oil palm plantations in the Belgian Congo and the Solomon Islands. Lever Brothers Ltd also acquired other soap companies including A&F Pears, John Knight of London, Gossage's of Widnes, Watson's of Leeds, Crosfield's of Warrington, Hazlehurst & Sons of Runcorn and Hudson's of Liverpool. The town of Leverville (the present-day Lusanga) was founded in the then district of Kwango, later part of the Province of Léopoldville, in the western part of the Belgian Congo and was named after William Lever (later Viscount Leverhulme).

=== Unilever ===
In September 1929, Unilever was formed by a merger of the operations of Dutch Margarine Unie and British soapmaker Lever Brothers, named as a blend of the two firms' names. By 1930, it employed 250,000 people and in terms of market value, was the largest company in Britain. Unilever was the first modern multinational company.

The Lever Brothers name was kept until the 1990s as an imprint, as well as the name of the US subsidiary, Lever Brothers Company, and a Canadian subsidiary, Lever Brothers Limited. Lever Brothers was sold to a US capital firm, Pensler Capital Corporation, and renamed Korex in 2008. Korex Don Valley assumed operations of the Lever Brothers Toronto plant. It has since gone bankrupt and closed. The Toronto plant is now being redeveloped into an office and industrial district by First Gulf Corporation.

== Presidents ==
Among its presidents was Charles Luckman, who, in the 1950s, championed the construction of the Lever House in New York City. Luckman left the company before the building's completion, moving on to a notable architectural career, including the design of Madison Square Garden, the Theme Building, the master plan for Los Angeles International Airport, the Aon Center, and major buildings at the Kennedy Space Center and Johnson Space Center.

== See also ==
- Breeze detergent
- Lever & Kitchen (disambiguation)
- Lever Brothers Factory originally located in Balmain, New South Wales, Australia
- Lever Brothers Factory, Toronto – re-development of Lever's Toronto factory and now being re-developed by First Gulf Corporation into a residential community.
- Port Sunlight
- Levers Pacific Plantations
- Leverburgh
