= Lever Brothers Factory =

Soap factory in Balmain, New South Wales, Australia

Coordinates: 33°51′44″S 151°10′49″E

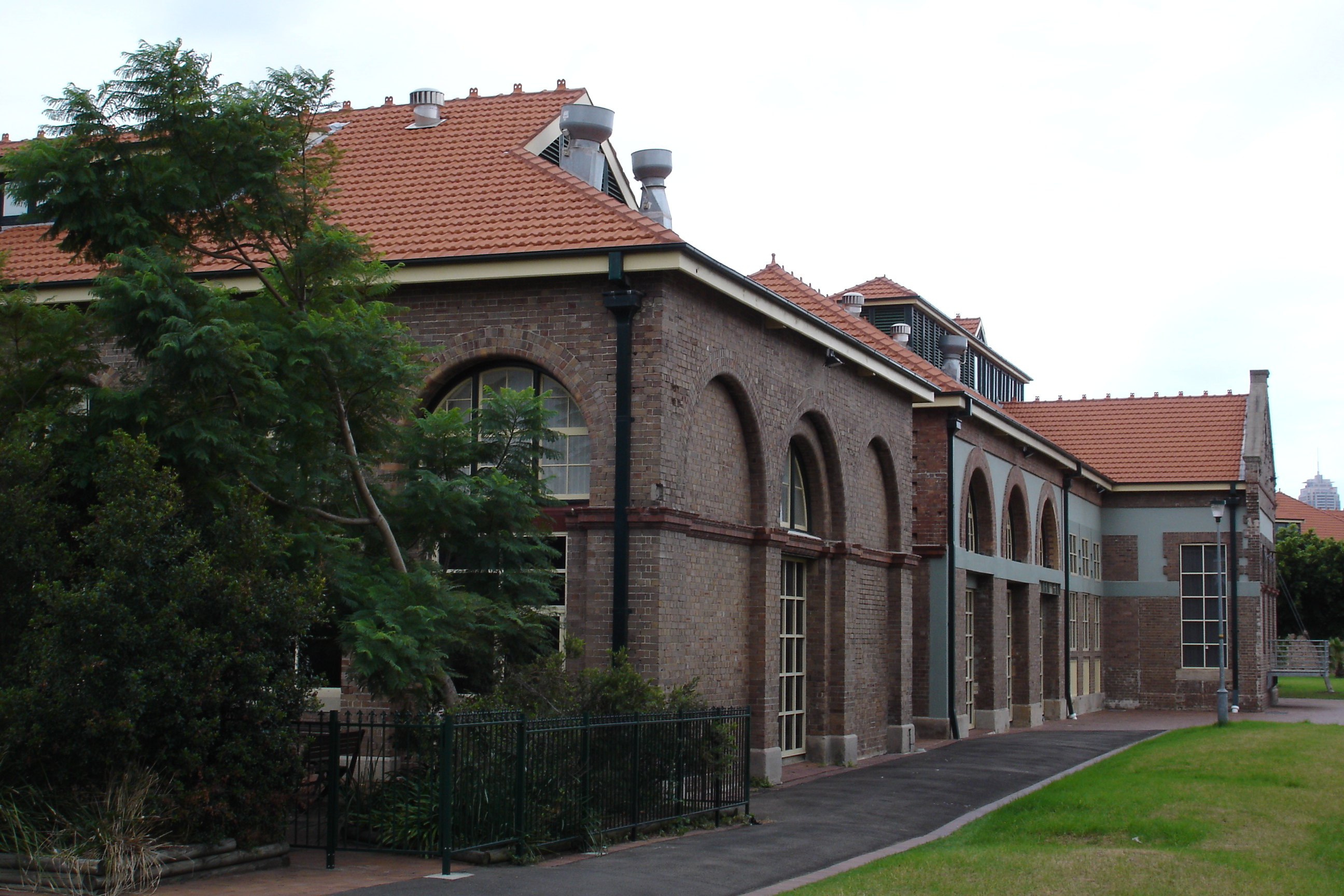
Original buildings now form part of the apartment complex.

The Lever Brothers Factory was a soap factory in the suburb of Balmain in Sydney, Australia, which operated from 1895 until 1988. It employed many people from the local area and its large industrial buildings were a prominent feature of the landscape. Most of the site was demolished in 1996 to make way for an apartment complex, and only three of the original buildings remain.

== Localization ==
The factory was on a 10-hectare (25-acre) site near Booth Street and Punch Park at the western end of Balmain, adjacent to White Bay.

== History ==
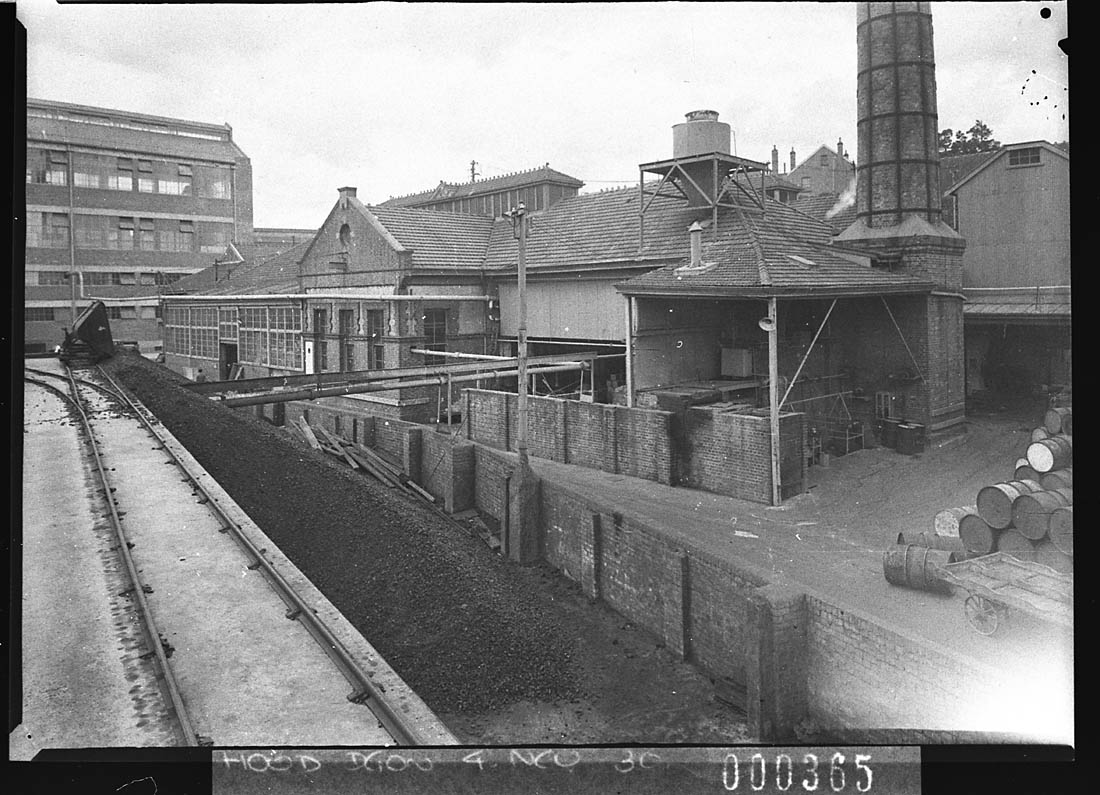
Coal supply to the Lever Brothers factory boiler, 1939.

The British company, Lever Brothers, was founded in 1885 by William Hesketh Lever, and Lever Brothers Ltd was incorporated in Australia on 21 June 1894. John Proctor Gray was appointed as the firm's Australian manager. Soon after this, in 1897, Lever Brothers established a plant at Balmain to extract oil from copra which was shipped back to Liverpool, England. In 1900, the Balmain plant began to manufacture Sunlight soap and glycerine, and other products followed.

Early in 1914, William Lever visited Melbourne as part of a worldwide tour of his company's interests. During the visit, he met with the owners of J.Kitchen & Sons, who were established local soap manufacturers, and offered to amalgamate the two firms. After consideration, it was agreed that Lever Bros would purchase three-quarters of the shares in J.Kitchen & Sons, in return for cumulative preferred ordinary shares in Levers. Levers later bought all the remaining shares and, by about 1923–24, fully owned both companies. Shortly after, the company became known as Lever & Kitchen.

In 1989, the Home and Personal Care businesses of Lever & Kitchen merged with the Australian firm, Rexona, to form L&K: Rexona. In 1993, the company changed its name to Lever Rexona and, in 2000, merged with Unilever Foods to form what is now Unilever Australasia.

At its prime in 1958, the Balmain factory employed as many as 1,250 workers. The complex contained a glycerine refinery, toilet soap plant, and an oil refining and hardening works, as well as many storage tanks, extensive wharves, and a small fleet of lighters and workboats.

The Balmain plant was wound down in the 1970s, having lost its waterfront and glycerine plant to the container wharf development at White Bay. Production eventually ceased in 1988. Together with the adjoining Ampol site, the area was sold in 1996 for the development of the Watervale, Dockside and Somerset Mews apartment complexes. Like many of the other Balmain industries, such as the former Balmain Power Station, the Colgate-Palmolive Factory, and the many shipyards, boilermakers and docks scattered about the Balmain foreshores, the Lever Brothers Factory became a victim of the ever-increasing property values in the area.

== Other information ==
- Balmain master soapmaker, William Wainwright, was mayor of Balmain in 1922 and one of a number of Freemasons at Lever Brothers.
- As well as soap and glycerine, the factory also produced Lifebuoy antiseptic soap, Monkey Brand soap, Lux flakes and toilet soap, Pears soap, Rinso, Persil, Solvol, Omo, Handy Andy, and Continental packet soups.
- William Lever is credited as being the first soap manufacturer to imprint a brand name on a bar of soap ("Sunlight") and wrap it before sale.
- In 1930, Australian politician William Wentworth worked briefly at the site as a factory-hand.
