= William Lever, 1st Viscount Leverhulme =

English industrialist, philanthropist and politician (1851–1925)

The Right Honourable The Viscount Leverhulme FRGS FRIBA
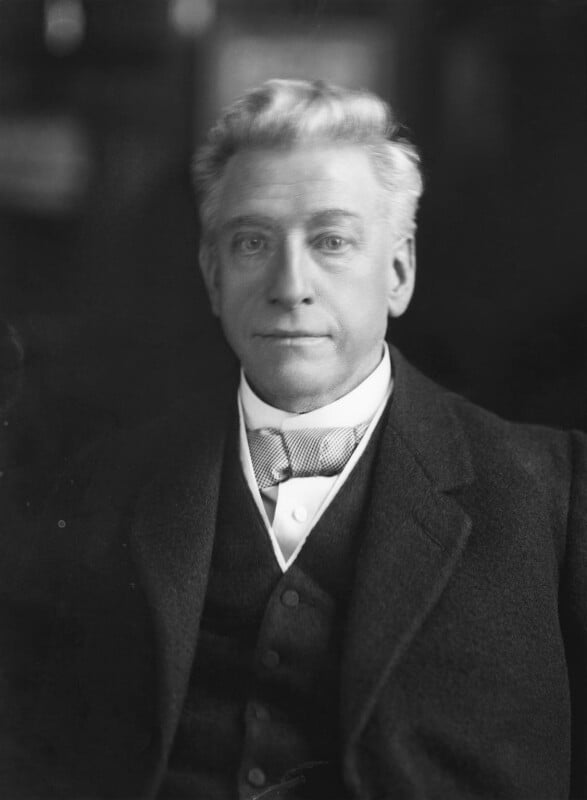
- Leverhume in 1922

Member of Parliament for Wirral
- In office 1906–1909
- Preceded by: Joseph Hoult
- Succeeded by: Gershom Stewart

Personal details
- Born: William Hesketh Lever; 19 September 1851 Bolton, Lancashire, England
- Died: 7 May 1925 (aged 73) Hampstead, London, England
- Party: Liberal Party
- Spouse: Elizabeth Ellen Hulme (m. 1874; died 1913)
- Children: William, 2nd Viscount Leverhulme
- Education: Bolton Church Institute; University of Edinburgh
- Occupation: Industrialist, philanthropist and politician
- Known for: Lever Brothers

William Hesketh Lever, 1st Viscount Leverhulme FRGS FRIBA (/ˈliːvər, ˈliːvərhjuːm/; 19 September 1851 – 7 May 1925) was an English industrialist, philanthropist, and politician. Educated at a small private school until the age of nine, then at church schools, he joined his father's wholesale grocery business in Bolton at the age of fifteen. Following an apprenticeship and a series of appointments in the family business, which he successfully expanded, he began manufacturing Sunlight Soap, building a substantial business empire with many well-known brands such as Lux and Lifebuoy. In 1886, together with his brother, James, he established Lever Brothers, which was one of the first companies to manufacture soap from vegetable oils, and which is now part of the British multinational Unilever. In politics, Lever briefly sat as a Liberal MP for Wirral and later, as Lord Leverhulme, in the House of Lords as a peer. He was an advocate for expansion of the British Empire, particularly in Africa and Asia, which supplied palm oil, a key ingredient in Lever's product line. His firm had become associated with activities in the Belgian Congo by 1911.

A patron of the arts, Lever began collecting artworks in 1893 when he bought a painting by Edmund Leighton. Lever's rival in the soap industry, A & F Pears, had taken the lead in using art for marketing by buying paintings such as Bubbles by John Everett Millais to promote its products. Lever's response was to acquire similarly illustrative works, and he later bought The New Frock by William Powell Frith to promote the Sunlight soap brand. In 1922 he founded the Lady Lever Art Gallery at Port Sunlight in Cheshire which he dedicated to his late wife Elizabeth.

== Biography ==
William Lever was born on 19 September 1851 at 16 Wood Street, Bolton, Lancashire, England. He was the eldest son and the seventh child born to James Lever (1809–1897), a grocer, and Eliza Hesketh, daughter of a cotton mill manager. From age six to age nine William attended a small private school run by the Misses Aspinwall in a house on Wood Street, not far from the Lever family home. At the age of nine he was sent to another of Bolton's private schools before finishing his formal education at Bolton Church Institute from 1864 to 1867. Not a particularly bright scholar, he was nevertheless keen to acquire academic learning. His mother wanted him to enter the learned professions, ostensibly medicine, and William himself was very interested in becoming an architect. His father, however, had other, somewhat less erudite plans for his eldest son and thus, not long after his fifteenth birthday, he started work in the family grocery business. By then, the Lever family had moved from Wood Street to a larger house adjacent to the grocery business. In the celebrated Victorian manner, the boss's son was, initially at least, shown no preferential treatment, being required to sweep the floor and tidy up before the staff arrived. Other tasks included various practical assignments more to do with the fundamentals of the wholesale grocery trade, almost certainly designed to prepare the youth for management in later years. His remuneration was "a shilling a week all found" which meant that his board and lodgings were provided, making the financial aspect of the contract more-or-less pocket money.

At some stage, William was moved to the administration department where he learned about and subsequently reorganised the firm's accounting and bookkeeping systems. Perhaps in order to escape the shackles of his father's close supervision, he eventually petitioned to take the place of a retiring sales representative; in those days, being a "rep" meant a great deal of travelling by horse and carriage and spending nights away from home, as well as a measure of independence and some leeway in making decisions and brokering deals with the canny retailers on his route.

The Lever family were Congregationalists and James Lever, a teetotaller and a non-smoker, applied its principles in his business life as well as in his personal life. In accordance with nonconformist tenets, the Lever family held frequent Bible readings at home, and were regular worshipers at the local chapel. Thus, William's circle of friends tended to comprise children of similar backgrounds and beliefs. Among these was Elizabeth Ellen Hulme (Dec 1850 – 24 July 1913) whose family also resided on Wood Street. In the tradition of the nineteenth-century well-to-do middle classes, William paid court to Elizabeth over several years and, when the financial circumstances allowed, he formally proposed marriage. On 17 April 1874, after a two-year engagement, they were married at the Church of St Andrew and St George (then Congregational, now United Reformed) on St Georges Road, Bolton.

In 1879 the Lever family business acquired a failing wholesale grocer in Wigan, affording young William an opportunity to prove his ability as a quasi-autonomous administrator. The expanded activity necessitated a search for new suppliers, taking William to Ireland, France and other parts of Europe, appointing local agents to safeguard the firm's interests. At this time, his flair for advertising and branding began to emerge as he successfully differentiated the Lever brand from generic commodities. By the end of 1879, the business' prospects were good enough to convince William and Elizabeth to invest in a new home in Bolton and by 1881 the expanding Wigan business warranted the commissioning of new premises; Lever and Company was expanding steadily.

=== Freemasonry ===
In 1902, when he became the first initiate of a lodge bearing his name (William Hesketh Lever Lodge No. 2916 in Port Sunlight) Lever involved himself in Freemasonry. In 1907 he became Worshipful Master, going on to found many Lodges and hold various offices at national level. In 1907, while sitting as an MP, he was a founder of the Phoenix Lodge 3236, and in May 1912 he founded St. Hilary Lodge No. 3591. He then became Past Pro-Grand Warden (P.P.G.W) and Immediate Past Master (I.P.M). In 1919, he was appointed Senior Grand Warden of the Grand Lodge of Mark Master Masons of England. He was Provincial Senior Grand Warden of the Provincial Grand Lodge of Cheshire, and founded many other Lodges.

== Sunlight soap ==
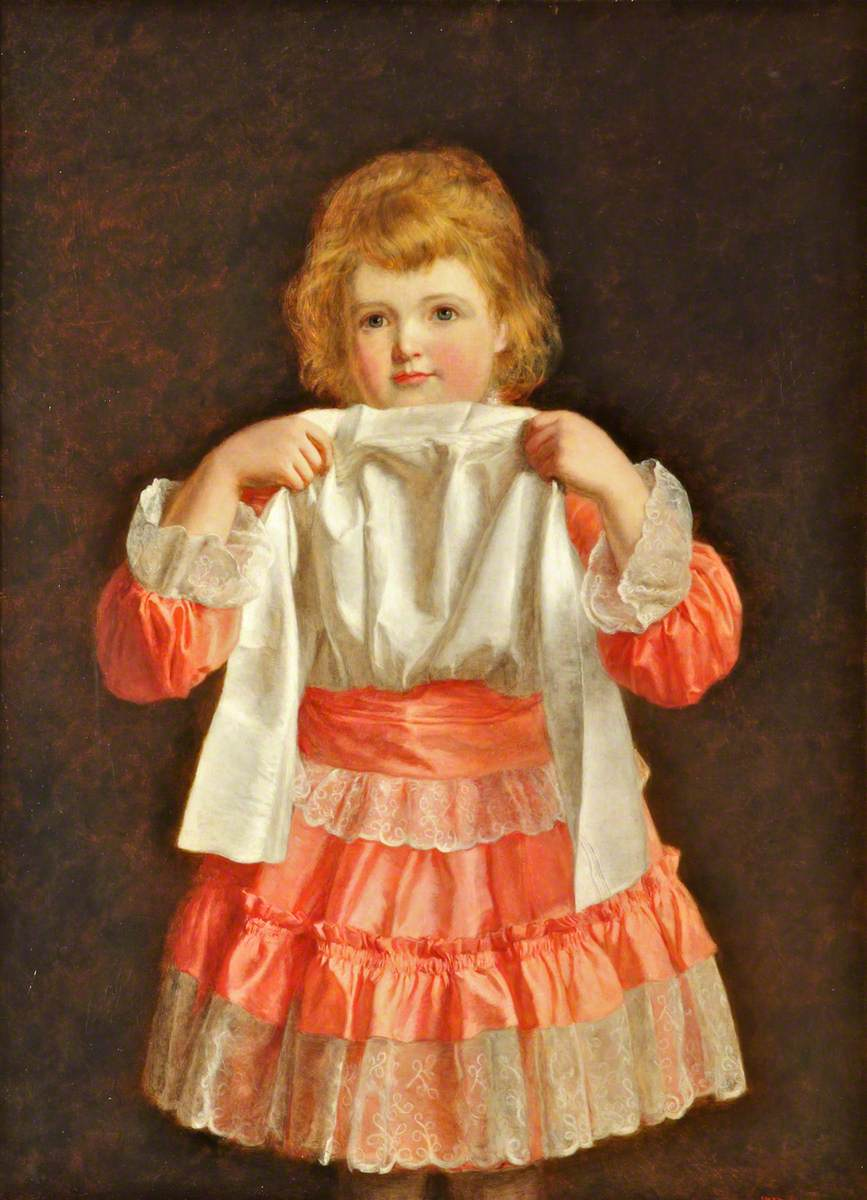
The New Frock by William Powell Frith, 1889. Lever used the image in his advertising campaigns

In 1884, having developed Lever and Company to a point where it was virtually self-governing, William resolved to capture a large share of the international soap trade. In essence, he planned to manufacture and market a range of high quality, price differentiated products, using a strategy based upon his experiences with butter and other commodity products. Thus, instead of selling soap by weight, he had it cut into small, manageable tablets which were individually wrapped. The Trade Mark Registration Act 1875 protected trade names from counterfeiters and imitators, and this opened the way for brand name recognition and consumer loyalty. Within 12 months, Lever had registered a series of trade marks, among them Sunlight, a house style that was later applied to a range of household soaps.

The Lever soap campaign began with a range of Sunlight branded soaps differentiated mainly by colour: Pale, Mottled and Brown, with a fourth variant presented as a product that was especially formulated for washing clothes. This 'Sunlight Self-Washer Soap' was widely advertised using billboards and posters located at public places throughout northern England. But at that time, Lever had to rely for supplies on "soap-boilers" – independent firms that specialised in producing soap to order – who were expected to work to his proprietary formula. The reliability of these suppliers was however apparently questionable, as variations in the end product gave rise to complaints about the effectiveness, and even the smell, of Self-Washer.

After much consideration, William began to consider the possibility of taking control of the manufacture, and thus the quality, of Sunlight soaps. He had discovered a small producer based in Warrington that badly needed to increase its output in order to become profitable and although Lever could probably have solved its problem though placing orders for most of his soap, he clearly wanted complete control. Having persuaded his father and younger brother that it would be a beneficial strategy, William raised sufficient capital for the takeover to take place and in August 1885 Lever and Company, wholesale grocers, added soap manufacturing to its range of activities.

The success of the Sunlight brand, especially after Lever assumed full responsibility for the product's quality, was exceptional; so much so that by the end of 1887 it had become impossible to squeeze any more capacity from the Warrington plant. Having failed to either extend the site or find more space in the areas, Lever eventually decided to move the whole manufacturing facility to an 11 acres (4.5 ha) green-field site near Birkenhead.

=== Port Sunlight ===
Lever was the founder of 'Port Sunlight'. In 1887, Lever bought 56 acres (23 ha) of land on the Wirral in Cheshire between the River Mersey and the railway line at Bebington. This site became Port Sunlight where he built his works and a model village to house its employees. From 1888, Port Sunlight village offered decent living conditions in the belief that good housing would ensure a healthy and happy workforce. The community was designed to house and support the workers. Life in Port Sunlight included intrusive rules and implied mandatory participation in activities. The tied cottages meant that a worker losing his or her job could be almost simultaneously evicted.

In some matters, Lever was keen to allow the residents of Port Sunlight a degree of democratic control, and this seems to have led to a common conviction that he was in favour of women's suffrage: a belief that possibly stems from a situation arising in connection the Bridge Inn, a Port Sunlight temperance "pub" that was opened in 1900. Lever was a lifelong teetotaller, and he naturally assumed that the Bridge would be "dry". Within two years of its opening, however, representations were made to change its status to a licensed house. Lever promptly announced that he would not impose his own views, and that the issue would be decided by a referendum; insisting somewhat unconventionally for that time that women would take part. With the added proviso that the Bridge would only become a true British "pub" if a supermajority of 75% was in favour, Lever probably felt confident that the outcome would support his abstemious sentiments, but in the event more than 80% voted for an alcohol licence and even though some people petitioned Lever urging him to use his absolute authority in Port Sunlight and ignore the referendum, he refused to do so.

In reality, workers' social lives were policed from the head office, and some of Lever's employees clearly resented his paternalism. However well intentioned, the power it afforded the company, even though it was rarely exercised, was viewed as an attack on workers' liberty and human rights. Although many such people preferred to find their own accommodation, there were others who, for whatever reason, were never given an opportunity to reside in Port Sunlight. Perhaps Lever's observations on this matter are revealing:

The private habits of an employee have really nothing to do with Lever Brothers providing the man is a good workman. At the same time, a good workman may have a wife of objectionable habits, or he may have objectionable habits himself, which make it undesirable to have him in the (Port Sunlight) village. . . .

— William Lever,

=== Advertising ===
It is clear that skilful advertising and favourable publicity were major positive factors in the early success of Lever's enterprise. Much of the Sunlight brand "message" focussed on the alleviation of drudgery in the lives of working class housewives, targeted no doubt because of the increased spending power and improved education of that large section of the British population, the skilled workers. For inspiration, Lever turned to the United States and he seems to have had no reservations in adopting American methods in Above The Line (ATL) and Below The Line (BTL) advertising. One subtle proposition introduced from America was designed to persuade women that the toil of housework was responsible for an accelerated aging process, and that Sunlight Soap offered a form of liberation. This, and other similarly cautionary messages, were posted on hoardings and on the sides of buses together with pictures that underscored the slogans. Promotional literature, in the form of instructions about the best ways of using the company's products, was widely distributed, as well as allegorical accounts of their successful adoption by stylish – and totally fictional – upper-class ladies.

One of the more remarkable Below The Line projects was the Sunlight Year Book, which was a type of almanac first introduced in 1895. These were quite substantial (the 1899 version had 480 pages) publications which evolved into a hard-backed and 'Profusely Illustrated' volume, described by the publisher as:

A Treasury of Useful Information of value to all Members of the Household. Including Calendar and Kindred Matter, British Colonies and Dependencies, Geography, Literature, Science, Fine Arts, Commerce, Architecture, Agriculture, Army and Navy, Sports and Pastimes, Cycling Maps, The Household, Medical, Port Sunlight, etc. Also Specially Written Story by Sir Walter Besant.

These books were distributed widely, and many were given to the head teachers of schools, causing protests from members of the Soap Makers Association. Other schemes adopted from the USA included competitions with cash prizes, coupons and tokens included in soap packaging, and sponsorship of worthy causes such as a lifeboat named Sunlight. The success of these schemes soon led to their adoption by Lever's competitors, although they eventually became difficult to sustain as raw material costs began to increase during the first decade of the twentieth-century, inducing most soap makers to phase them out.

Lever's desire to directly influence the consumer led to the employment of "District Agents" whose tasks involved engaging directly with members of the public in order to advance the merits of the company's products, as well as to act as undercover agents who reported on anything they observed that could be useful to Port Sunlight. The success of this aspect of Lever's marketing strategy led to the first overseas manufacturing plant being established in Switzerland. 'Savonneries Helvetia' was the inspiration of the somewhat charismatic François-Henri Lavanchy-Clarke, Lever's District Agent in Switzerland who used the fledgling cinema industry as an advertising tool. The success of this venture led, by 1900, to the establishment of factories in Switzerland, Germany, Canada, the United States, Holland, and Australia with several others planned, while the Sunlight brand had been strengthened by the addition of Lifebuoy, Vim and Lux.

=== Soap combine ===
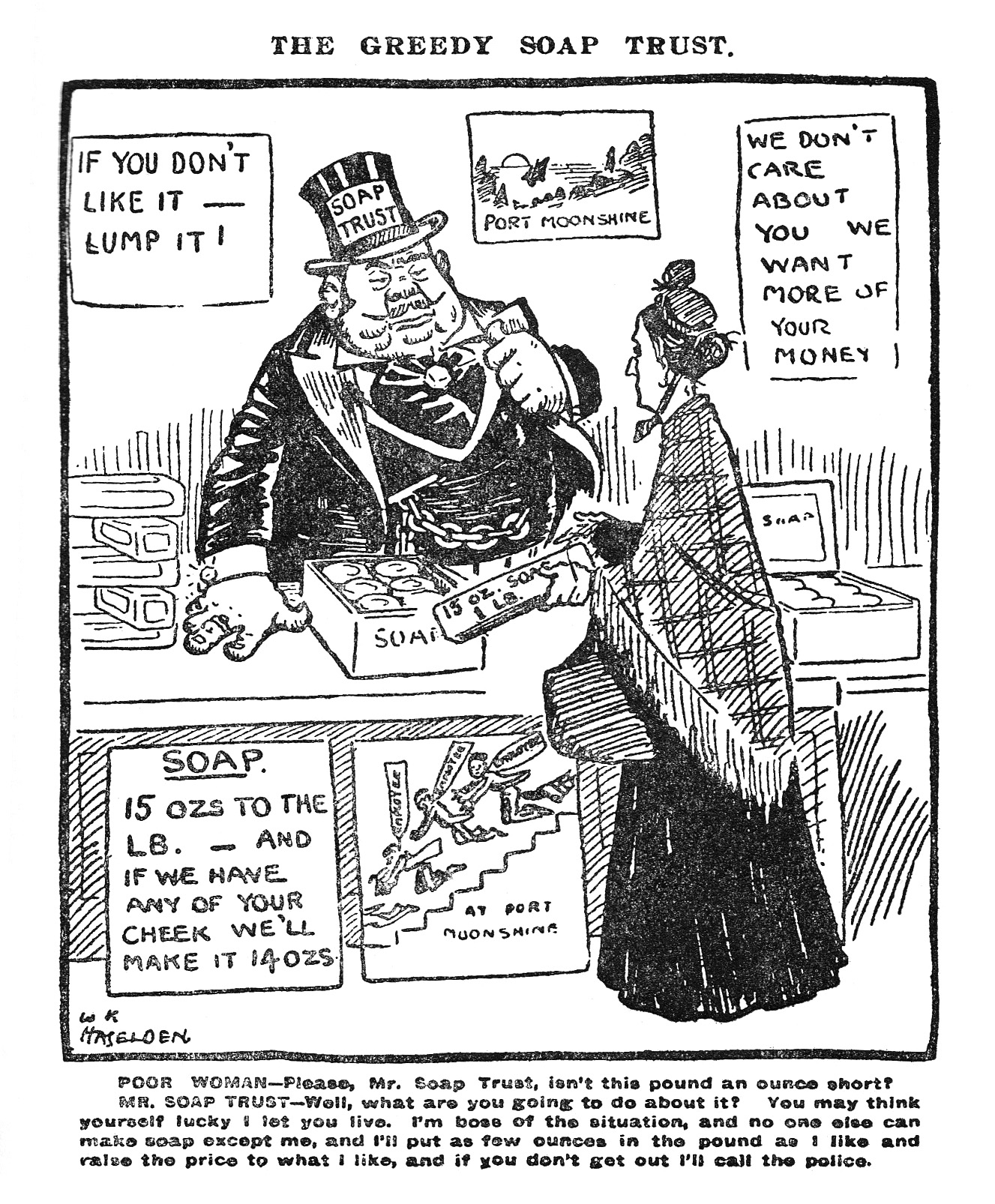
Cartoon from The Daily Mirror, 22 October 1906; a parody of William Lever, whose factory was named "Port Sunlight"

By 1905, many of the raw materials used in the manufacture of soap were being used by makers of margarine and other new products, and in early 1906 it was clear that this increased demand was not temporary, and prices rose sharply. Concern in the soap-making industry was widespread and, in some cases, acute, competition became fierce, leading to increases in advertising expenses which served only to exacerbate an already critical situation. Lever himself considered, and then rejected, some rather drastic alterations to the Sunlight formula; eventually deciding on reducing the weight of the standard bar. In July 1906 he was asked to attend a meeting in Liverpool, called by a group of soap-makers based in the north of England. The result was an accord to put in motion changes that would effectively cartelise the industry by stifling competition and controlling prices to the consumer.

Lever attempted to rationalise the formation of the Soap Trust by claiming that the industry would become more efficient, thus making cost savings that could be passed on to the consumer; assertions that could never be realised. Financial manoeuvres made by Lever were designed to maximise the Lever Brothers position within the cartel included takeovers and share issues, but as more people became aware of their plans, it was inevitable that information would be leaked to the press. Nevertheless, retrenchments were set in motion, including the cancellation of several substantial press advertising campaigns. By October, several newspapers were publishing articles about the Soap Trust, and some began to represent Lever as the leading character in an infamous conspiracy.

Headlines in the Daily Mail, Daily Mirror, and Evening News proclaimed: "Soap Trust Arithmetic – How 15 ounces make a pound", "Dismissal of employees begins", and "Trust Soap Already Dearer". Other allegations included claims that the Trust was trying to control the available supplies of raw materials and that it was preparing to use 'unsavoury substances' in its soaps. Port Sunlight, parodied as 'Port Moonshine', was portrayed as a sweatshop, reports by disgruntled retailers were given prominent positions and readers were urged to buy products made by non-Trust manufacturers.

Lord Northcliffe took a personal interest in the anti-Soap Trust campaign. While extending assurances of "the strictest impartiality" to Lever, Northcliffe's close friendship with Theodore Roosevelt revealed his support for the American's activities as a 'trustbuster'. Roosevelt's investigations of dishonest dealings among many American companies had been fully reported in Britain, eliciting a pious chorus of disapproval and claims that any similar wrongdoing by British firms would be unimaginable but Northcliffe, pointing to the existence of a British Tobacco Trust, was not convinced. He set in motion a campaign of investigative journalism, some of which seems to have verged upon persecution; the clear objective of which was to smash Lever's soap combine.

The campaign had a surprisingly rapid and strikingly negative impact on the member companies, particularly on Lever Brothers' businesses. By November 1906, Lever sales had fallen by sixty per cent compared with the previous year and Lever Brothers shares had lost around twenty-five per cent of their value; other members of the Combine experienced similarly devastating declines. Such conditions inevitably led to a reassessment of the position and, following a meeting of all firms involved in the alliance, but without the wholehearted approval of Lever himself, a decision was made to bring the organization to an end. Most of the members of the failed cartel found their reputations seriously tarnished, and none escaped financial damage; Lever estimated his losses at "considerably over half a million". For Northcliffe, this was clearly a victory of liberty over iniquity, a view reflected in the Daily Mail's headline, "Public Opinion Smashed the Soap Trust".

=== Daily Mail libel case ===
Perhaps naturally, Lever felt that the failure of the soap combine was the result of animosity and resentment directed at him personally, rather than as a consequence of its members' dishonesty. Having sought several opinions on the authority of his suit, he retained Sir Edward Carson and two juniors, one of whom was Frederick Edwin Smith, later Lord Birkenhead. For the defendants, Rufus Isaacs, later Marquess of Reading and Viceroy of India, assisted by another K.C. and two juniors, acted for Associated Newspapers Ltd. Lever's legal team were in no doubt of the outcome; as F.E. Smith reportedly observed "There is no answer to this action for libel and the damages must be enormous." On 15 July 1907 the case came up at Liverpool before Mr Justice Lawrence.

The circumstances in which the trial took place were unusual in that, while Lever's legal team were accommodated at Thornton Manor, Lord Northcliffe, the principal witness for the defence, was overseas and, according to Jolly, "had no intention of returning within range of any writ server while the case was on." It seems clear, therefore, that Northcliffe was in the wrong and, moreover, he knew that he would most probably lose the case: he reportedly offered Lever a public apology shortly before the start of the trial. For the plaintiff, Carson accused Associated Newspapers of conducting a malicious campaign "with the object of smashing up Lever Brothers". Speaking for more than five hours, he listed a number of complaints and asked the jury to award punitive damages. He then called Lever as his first witness, inviting the leader of the defence team to "cross-examine him to his heart's content, and, when his time comes, I hope he will be able to follow my example and do the same, and call as his first witness his own client, Lord Northcliffe..."

Such was the impression of Lever's demeanour and testimony on the defence team that, as soon as the court was assembled on the following day, they capitulated completely. They also stated that, on behalf of their clients that they wished to retract completely "every imputation made upon Mr Lever's honour and integrity" and express their deepest regrets for having made such malicious attacks upon him. There followed a scene on the floor of the court wherein the legal teams literally haggled over the size of the financial settlement. In the end, the sum agreed to was £50,000, plus around £40,000 which was eventually awarded from individual newspapers. This victory was celebrated with a day's holiday at Port Sunlight, where Lever blithely addressed the employees and other spectators who cheered and applauded their hero.

Lever Brothers had indeed been seriously damaged by the press, as well as by rises in the costs of raw materials, but Lever hesitated to use the court awarded cash to bolster the company. Instead, he presented it all to Liverpool University, bestowing significant sums to the faculties of Town Planning, Tropical Medicine, and Russian Studies, while making sure that an enduring record of the litigation was ensconced in the University library.

== Africa ==
In the early 1900s, Lever was using palm oil produced in the British West African colonies. When he found difficulties in obtaining more palm plantation concessions, he started looking elsewhere. In 1911, Lever signed a treaty with the Belgian Government to gain access to the palm oil of the Belgian Congo and opened his operation under a subsidiary of the Lever consortium named Huileries du Congo Belge (HCB) after buying a concession for 750,000 hectares (1,900,000 acres) of forest for palm oil production. The main coordinating base was established at Leverville in what was then the district of Kwango, later part of the Province of Léopoldville.

The company town of Leverville was a project born out of the shared desire of the Belgian Government and of Lever Brothers to build a 'moral' form of capitalism in Central Africa. For Belgium, Lever Brothers was an ideal partner, a company hailed for the social policies it had put in place in Great Britain. For Lever, HCB was expected to become the crowning achievement of his own brand of "moral capitalism". A few months before his death, Lord Leverhulme, as he then was, wrote in a private letter that the Huileries were "a business like none other we have. Perhaps Port Sunlight comes nearest to it in social work". By 1923, a Lever soap factory was built there, and by 1924 SAVCO (Savonneries Congolaises) was established.

Lever's attitudes towards the Congolese were paternalistic and his views were much more progressive than most industrialists of the time. Malcolm Hardman writes that "Lever observed and respected the intelligence and integrity of the Congolese he was allowed to meet". Sir William Lever, Baronet, as he had become in December 1911, firmly believed that paid labour alongside the schools, hospitals and rations his company promised to provide would attract workers. However, "the harshness and danger of the labour demanded from them, living in camps away from their homes, as well as the poor remuneration HCB offered, failed to interest them."

Failing to find sufficient voluntary workers, HCB turned to the Belgian colonial authorities, a brutal regime notorious for their use of a system of travail forcé (forced labour). The Belgians were "grateful to have a partnership with an enlightened entrepreneur to help salvage their battered reputation" and it allowed Lever to recruit the Congolese workforce he needed. Leverhulme's participation in this system of formalised labour has been documented by Jules Marchal, who contends that, "Leverhulme set up a private kingdom reliant on the horrific Belgian system of forced labour, a program that reduced the population of Congo by half and accounted for more deaths than the Nazi holocaust". The archives show a record of Belgian administrators, missionaries and doctors protesting against the practices at the Lever plantations. Formal parliamentary investigations by the Belgian Parliament were called for by members of the Belgian Socialist Party.

The company's former Congo plantations today operate under the control of Feronia Inc, employing approximately 4,000 people, acquired by the firm in 2009.

== Lewis & Harris ==
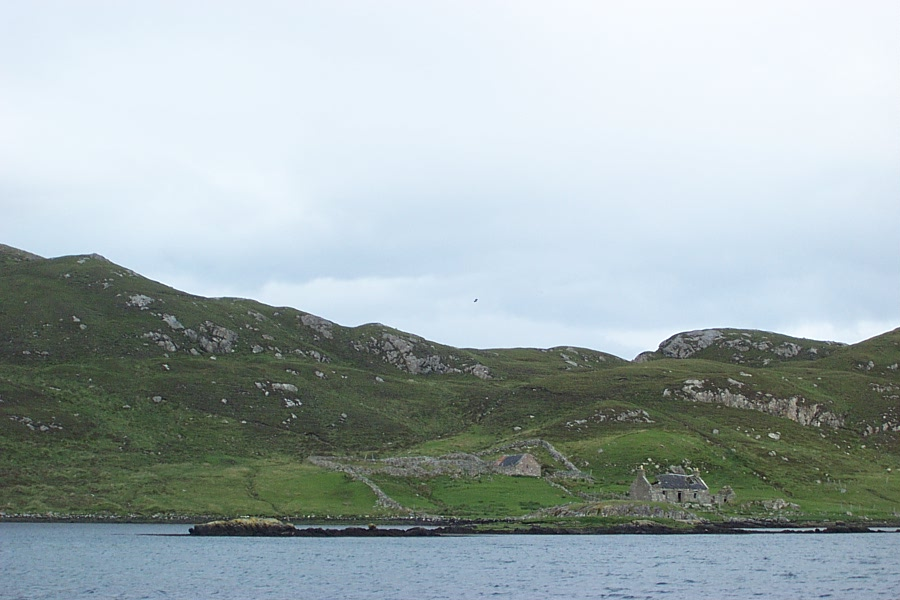
Abandoned house, Lewis

In May 1918, by then in semi-retirement, Baron Leverhulme, as he was now, bought the Isle of Lewis for £167,000 (equivalent to £16,700,000 in 2025). And in late 1919 he bought the estate of South Harris for £36,000; both in the Outer Hebrides, Scotland. His plans for their future prosperity centred upon the application of modern science and his own business skills in establishing a large and thriving fishing industry. Although Stornoway had a good harbour, there were many disadvantages to Lord Leverhulme's plans for the port. Its remoteness led to additional transport costs for ice, fuel, packaging, and anything else that had to be imported, as well as for the fish products, almost all of which was sold on the Scottish mainland. The place itself was, for various reasons, unpopular with sailors, and the local population's strict Presbyterian observance of the Sabbath had a negative effect on fishing operations, while catches of varieties of fish other than herring were unfeasibly small.

Lord Leverhulme intended that the port should be improved and enlarged to attract landings of fish from visiting vessels to supplement catches made by local boats and his own fleet of modern drifters and trawlers. There would be an ice-making factory, and cargo vessels with refrigerated holds to take the fresh fish to a depot on the British mainland at Fleetwood, Lancashire, which was well placed to serve the industrial towns of the North of England. Leverhulme also expanded the herring-curing capacity and enlarged the fish processing facilities with the installation of a canning factory, and a plant to make fishcakes, fishpaste, glue, animal feed, and fertiliser, with similar equipment being established at Fleetwood.

Vertical Integration was apparently one of Leverhulme's main strategies for the island fisheries venture, and to this end he acquired retail fishmonger's shops in most of the UK's larger towns and cities: all were modernised and refitted, and their previous proprietors were installed as managers. This aspect of Lever's Hebridean venture was named Mac Fisheries; the fleet of fishing vessels the MacLine Company. Mac Fisheries was a success, and it grew rapidly until there were over four hundred shops all purchasing fish from many different wholesale suppliers. Other food industry enterprises were acquired including Wall's, a manufacturer of ice-cream and sausages, and various companies specialising in different segments of the fish business, as well as several fishing fleet owners and operators. Although these developments brought tangible benefits to the people of Lewis, Leverhulme's plans did not suit everyone, and this anomaly created severe obstacles for his ambitious plans for the Western Isles.

Typically, Leverhulme's business strategies were comprehensive and meticulously set out. His plans for the island called for a reliable workforce, but although the inhabitants of Stornoway were generally well educated and hardworking, they were for the most part regularly employed and well paid. The largely Gaelic-speaking crofters, on the other hand, were mainly subsistence farmers and many of them were squatters; and it was this section of the population that Leverhulme hoped to develop and recruit. The crofters were poor, but they were used to an independent lifestyle that was both long established and deeply ingrained in their psyche. Nevertheless, Leverhulme planned to entice them into becoming carbon copies of his Lancashire artisans by offering them an attractive alternative to their meagre smallholdings. He did not actively oppose the crofter's way of life, but neither did he support it as some thought he, as their patron, ought to have done. When the crofters learned about the money that was being expended on other projects, they began to resent his lack of support for them.

Leverhulme did his utmost to woo the population of Lewis and to make himself – as well as his schemes – popular among all the islanders. This seems to have worked to some extent, but there were other sceptics whose voices were heard in government circles. Robert Munro, the Secretary of State for Scotland, and Donald Murray, the MP for the Western Isles, as well as a number of supporting characters including most of the House of Commons, were anxious to redress past oppression of the Highlanders who had so recently served with outstanding bravery in the First World War.

The Small Landholders (Scotland) Act 1911 had empowered the Scottish Secretary, on behalf of His Majesty's Government, to acquire certain farms in the Highlands and Islands by compulsory purchase and to have them divided up to provide more crofts. In 1913, four farms on Lewis had been scheduled for take-over, but the action had been opposed by the proprietor at that time, and when the war with Germany broke out it was left in abeyance. Towards the end of the war, in the summer of 1918, the Scottish Office first proposed to Leverhulme that under the Small Landholders Act, the Board of Agriculture should take possession of certain of his farms and create something fewer than a hundred and fifty crofts. He was against this, even though some local politicians believed that Leverhulme's project and the provision of more crofts were not mutually exclusive, but Leverhulme firmly believed that he could greatly improve living standards to an extent that crofting would become a forgotten way of life. He was also impatient with politicians' machinations and the laborious indolence of the political system that persisted with the "futile land reform" instead of adopting what he considered the most sensible course of action; to forget about new crofts and allow him, in the interests of expediency, to behave like the 'monarch' of the Western Isles.

Thus, by the beginning of 1919, the positions taken up by those involved were fairly well defined. Robert Munro, himself a Highlander, believed passionately in the reinstatement of the crofts and he also felt strongly that the Imperial Parliament at Westminster was unlikely to tolerate any departure from the implementation of land reform, but he saw no reason why Lewis should not have Leverhulme's industrial schemes as well as more crofts. Leverhulme refused to budge, believing that the break-up of his farms would lead to seriously inefficient, probably unsustainable, and ultimately abandoned smallholdings as crofters moved away in search of better incomes. Ranged against this at least ostensibly reasonable prediction was the formidable influence wielded by prospective crofters away fighting in France, as well as by supporters of the Highland League which was politically dedicated to land reform.

In early March 1919, men started to take over Leverhulme's farms on Lewis. They drove off the farmers' livestock, demolished boundary walls, and staked out six-acre plots: by the summer sixteen out of the twenty-two farms on the island had been affected. Expecting Leverhulme's approval, the raiders were taken aback when he voiced his complete condemnation of their actions and asked them to withdraw from his land. Some left, but others erected shelters for their families on the stolen plots. Leverhulme was evidently not willing to prosecute ex-servicemen who were trying to secure homes for their families, and it seems unlikely that, under the circumstances, legal action would have succeeded. Instead, he toured Lewis trying to persuade them that their future lay with him and not in the crofting system. They were, however, extremely reluctant to abandon old ways and most of them continued to espouse the crofting way of life.

Attitudes began to harden and polarise, culminating in politicians pressing ahead with land reform and Leverhulme demanding a ten-year moratorium coupled with a thinly veiled threat to withdraw from his schemes. In early 1920, upon his return from a business trip to the US, Leverhulme learned that raiding had continued during his absence. By then, serious financial difficulties were besetting Lever Brothers concerning the disastrous Niger Company, making his decision about the Western Isles project relatively straightforward. With a pressing need to make significant savings, he announced his intention to concentrate his efforts on Stornoway and on Harris, and that all work in the country areas of Lewis would be abandoned forthwith.

The population of Harris was smaller in size and more scattered than that of Lewis. Consequently, Leverhulme's plans advanced there with very few problems. With permission from the locals, the fishing village of Obbe was renamed Leverburgh. On 3 September 1923, Viscount Leverhulme, as he had become the previous year, addressed the Stornoway Council and the Lewis District Council at a meeting which he had asked to be specially convened on that date. Lord Leverhulme asked them to take the land and make their system work, but only Stornoway, always on Leverhulme's side, accepted the gift, set up the Trust, and to a large extent made it work for the benefit of the town. Left with so much of the Island he no longer wanted, Leverhulme sold off as much as he could, but many of the buyers were interested principally in shooting and fishing. Leverhulme died in May 1925. Very soon thereafter, the Board of Lever Brothers gave orders for all development on Harris to stop, and so Leverhulme's scheme for the Western Isles perished with almost nothing achieved there.

== Politics ==
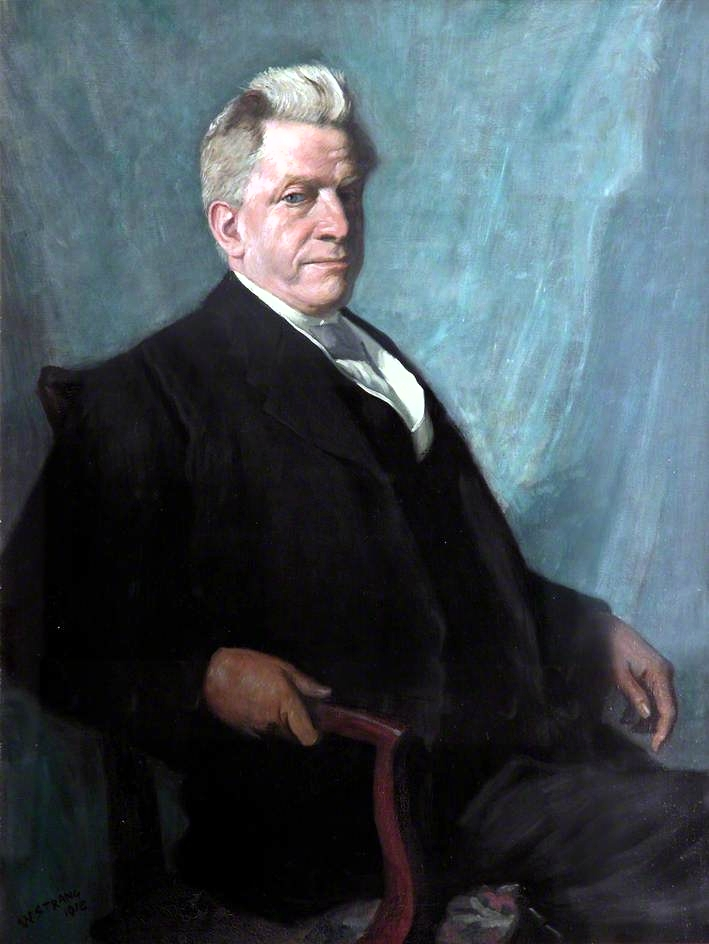
Leverhulme, in a portrait painted in 1918 by William Strang

Prior to serving in cabinet, Lever unsuccessfully contested Birkenhead (UK Parliament constituency) in 1892, 1894, 1895, and also lost at Ormskirk (UK Parliament constituency) in 1910. Lever was a lifelong supporter of William Ewart Gladstone and Liberalism. He was invited to contest elections for the Liberal Party. He served as Member of Parliament (MP) for the Wirral constituency between 1906 and 1909 and used his maiden speech in the House of Commons to urge Henry Campbell-Bannerman's government to introduce a national old age pension, such as the one he provided for his workers. On the recommendation of the Liberal Party, he was created a baronet in 1911 and raised to the peerage as Baron Leverhulme on 21 June 1917, the "hulme" element of his title being in honour of his wife, Elizabeth Hulme.

Lever had been justice of the peace for Cheshire, he was also High Sheriff of Lancashire in 1917. In November 1918 Lord Leverhulme was invited to become Mayor of Bolton though he was not a councillor because the council wanted to honour a "Notable son of the Town" as a mark of the high regard the citizens of Bolton had for him. He was elevated to the viscountcy on 27 November 1922. Also, Lever received the Order of Leopold II.

== Lever's homes ==
According to W.P. Jolly, "Of the dozen or so houses that Lever lived in, and upon which he stamped his own mark of reconstruction, the three most important were Thornton Manor, The Hill at Hampstead in London, and The Bungalow at Rivington." A further building he purchased was Rockhaven in 1899 in Horwich. It was built in 1820 by Richard Brownlow, a lawyer, who later became a recluse. It was acquired by Lever after Brownlow's death and was rented out until demolition in 1942, its land was used for coal mining.

=== Thornton Manor, Cheshire ===
In 1888, shortly after the birth of William, his only surviving child, Lever first rented then bought Thornton Manor in Thornton Hough in the Wirral, Cheshire. He subsequently acquired more land in the village and many of its picturesque, but outdated, houses were demolished and replaced with modern homes which were rented to Port Sunlight employees. The village was later provided with community amenities including a school, shops, social establishments and a church. Thornton Manor was restructured, and the gardens greatly extended.

=== The Hill at Hampstead ===
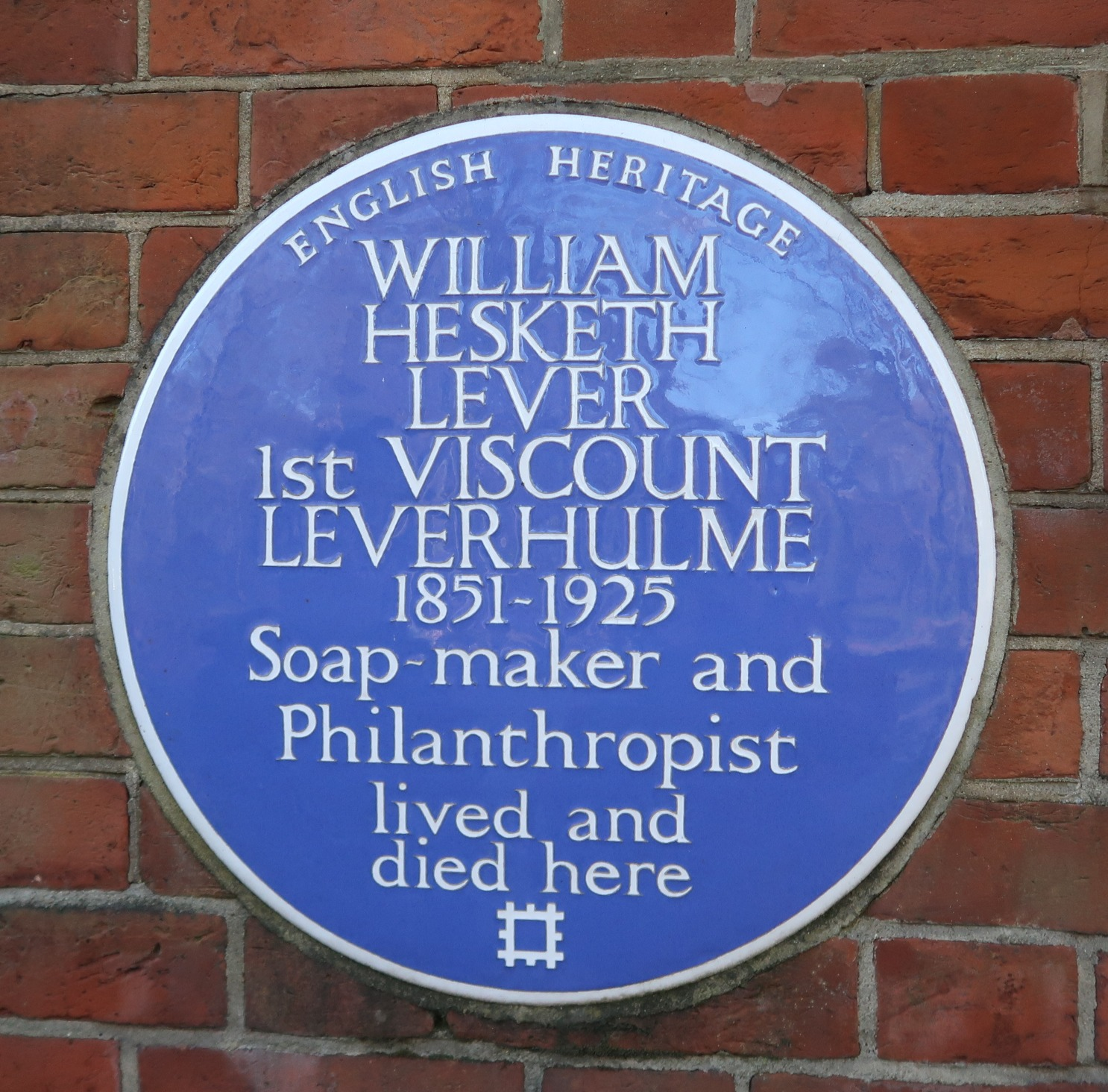
William Hesketh Lever blue plaque on the wall outside Inverforth House in Hampstead

In 1904, Lever purchased The Hill, an Edwardian mansion at Hampstead. It was renamed Inverforth House in 1925 after his death. He rebuilt the house and made additions including a wing on each side of the house, a ballroom and art gallery. In 1911 and 1914 he acquired two neighbouring properties to expand his garden. This led to a dispute with Hampstead Borough Council over Lever's intentions to take over a public right of way to join the two plots; an issue that was not resolved to his satisfaction. The Hill was his main home from 1919.

=== The Bungalow at Rivington ===
Suffragette Edith Rigby claimed to have set fire to Leverhulme's bungalow at Rivington on 7 July 1913, although it is suspected her confession was false. The property contained a number of valuable paintings and the attack resulted in damage costing £20,000.

== Death and funeral ==
Lever died at 73 of pneumonia at his home in Hampstead on 7 May 1925. His funeral was attended by 30,000 people. He is buried in the churchyard of Christ Church in Port Sunlight in what was then Cheshire, now Merseyside. He was succeeded by his son, William Lever, 2nd Viscount Leverhulme.

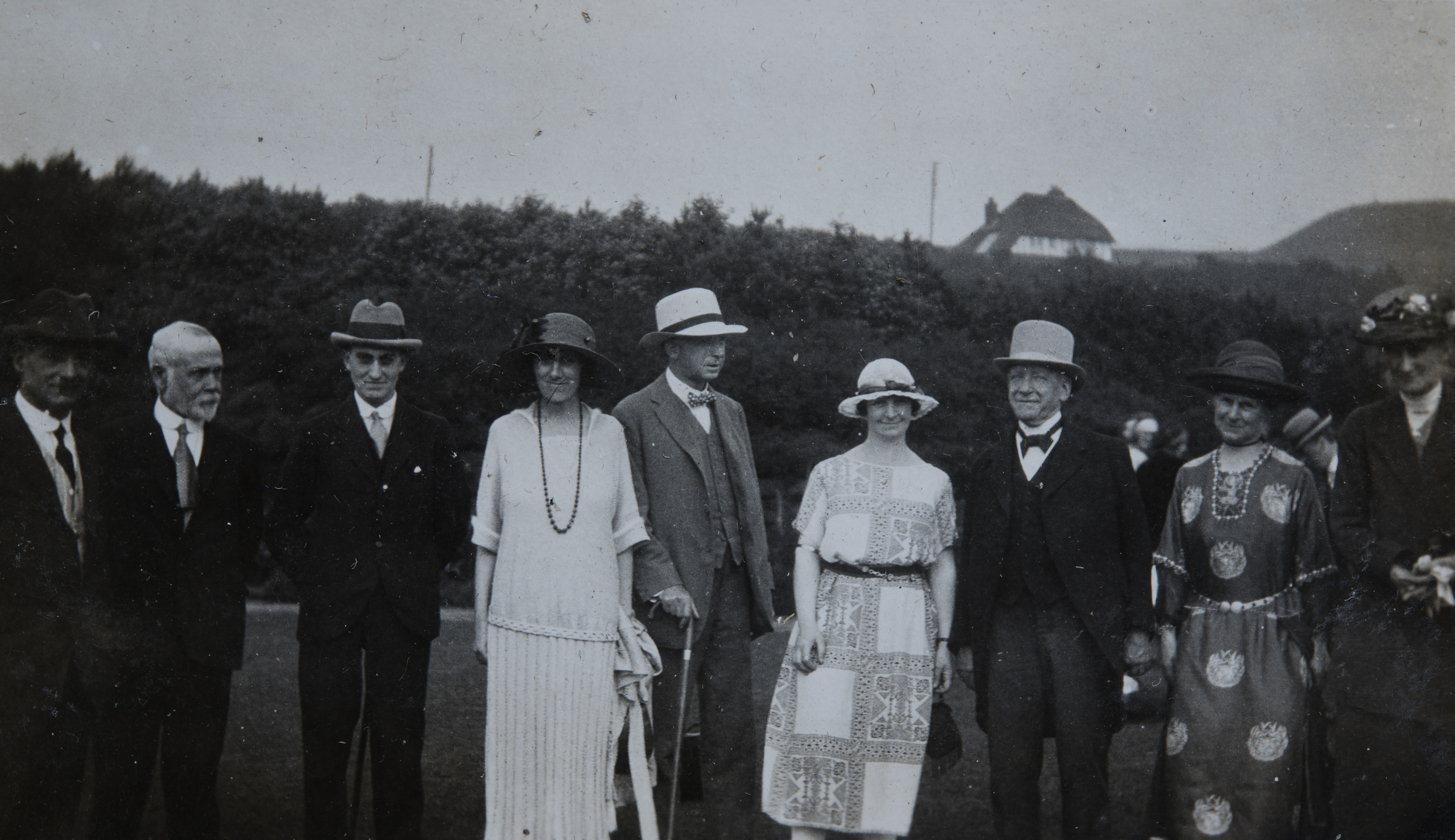
Lord Leverhulme at Bungalow, Rivington c. 1912

== Donations and building projects ==
Lever was a major benefactor to his native town, Bolton, where he was made a Freeman of the County Borough in 1902. In 1899, he bought Hall i' th' Wood, one time home of Samuel Crompton, and restored it as a museum for the town. He donated 360 acres (150 hectares) of land and landscaped Lever Park in Rivington in 1902. Lever was responsible for the formation of Bolton School after re-endowing Bolton Grammar School and Bolton High School for Girls in 1913. He donated the land for Bolton's largest park, Leverhulme Park, in 1914. In 1920 he donated £50 to the Selborne Society campaign to purchase land in west London, as the "Gilbert White Memorial" – it is now known as the Perivale Wood Local Nature Reserve.

Lever endowed a school of tropical medicine at Liverpool University, gave Lancaster House in London to the British nation and endowed the Leverhulme Trust set up to provide funding for education and research, the trust in 2017 became benefactor to Rivington and Blackrod High School and Harper Green School, both becoming Leverhulme Church of England Academies in Bolton. The garden of his former London residence 'The Hill' in Hampstead, designed by Thomas Mawson, is open to the public and has been renamed Inverforth House. A blue plaque at Inverforth House commemorating Lever was unveiled by his great-granddaughter, Jane Heber-Percy, in 2002.

Lever built many houses in Thornton Hough which became a model village comparable to Port Sunlight and in 1906 built Saint George's United Reformed Church. The Lady Lever Art Gallery opened in 1922 and is in the Port Sunlight conservation area. In 1915 Lever acquired a painting entitled Suspense by Charles Burton Barber. The painting was previously owned by his competitor, A & F Pears, who used paintings such as Bubbles by John Everett Millais to promote its products.

== In literature and popular culture ==
Lord Leverhulme's Hebridean venture was satirised by Neil Munro in his Erchie MacPherson story "The Coal Famine", first published in the Glasgow Evening News of 12 January 1920.

== Honours and arms ==
- Lever Baronetcy, of Thornton Manor (1911)
- Baron Leverhulme, of Bolton-le-Moors in the County Palatine of Lancaster (1917)
- Viscount Leverhulme, of The Western Isles in the Counties of Inverness and Ross and Cromarty (1922)
- High Sheriff of Lancashire, 1917

Coat of arms of William Lever, 1st Viscount Leverhulme
Crest A trumpet fesswise thereon a cock Proper charged on the breast with a rose as in the arms. Escutcheon Per pale Argent and barry of eight Or and Azure two bendlets Sable the upper one engrailed in sinister chief a chaplet Gules and in the dexter base a rose of the last leaved and seeded Proper. Supporters On either side an elephant Or charged on the shoulder with a rose Gules. Motto Mutare Vel Timere Sperno (I Scorn To Change Or Fear)

Parliament of the United Kingdom
Preceded by Joseph Hoult	Member of Parliament for Wirral; 1906–1910	Succeeded by Gershom Stewart
Peerage of the United Kingdom
New creation	Viscount Leverhulme; 1922–1925	Succeeded by William Hulme Lever
New creation	Baron Leverhulme; 1917–1925	Succeeded by William Hulme Lever
Baronetage of the United Kingdom
New creation	Baronet (of Thornton Manor); 1911–1925	Succeeded by William Hulme Lever
