= Charles Wright Macara =

British cotton spinner and textile industrialist

Sir Charles Wright Macara Bt
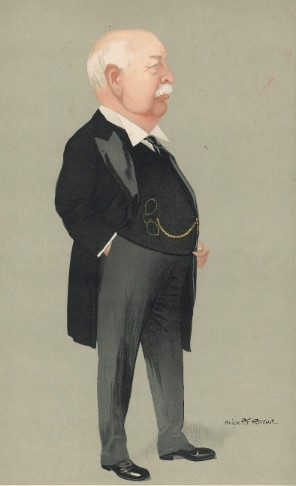
- Macara depicted in Vanity Fair by Alick Ritchie, 1912
- Born: 11 January 1845; Strathmiglo, Fife
- Died: 2 January 1929 (aged 83); Hale, Cheshire
- Burial place: St Annes Parish Churchyard, Lytham St Annes, Lancashire
- Citizenship: British
- Occupations: Cotton spinner Textile merchant
- Known for: Lifeboat Saturday Movement

Sir Charles Wright Macara, 1st Baronet (1845–1929) was a British cotton spinner and textile industrialist.

== Life ==
He was born in the manse at Strathmiglo on 11 January 1845, the son of Rev William Macara (1812-1889), a minister of the Free Church of Scotland, and his wife, Charlotte Grace Cowpar of Kirriemuir.

Charles Macara was educated privately and at Edinburgh. He was employed in 1862 in Manchester. In 1880 Macara was made chairman and managing director of Henry Bannerman & Sons (Ltd.) and Bannerman Mills Co. (Ltd.).

Motivated by the Southport and St Anne's lifeboats disaster, he founded in 1891, under the auspices of the Royal National Lifeboat Institution, the Lifeboat Saturday Movement to provide charity for the widows and orphans of drowned crew members. Marion Macara assisted him and founded the Ladies Lifeboat Guild. He directed the Lifeboat Saturday Movement, throughout the United Kingdom, until 1896. The initial Lifeboat Saturday raised over £5,000 and featured a parade of bands, floats and lifeboats through the streets of Manchester; it was the first recorded charity street collection. Similar parades were subsequently held in other Lancashire cities. The Lifeboat Saturday Movement provided collecting-boxes and organised door-to-door charitable solicitations and was the precursor of the Royal National Lifeboat Institution Flag Day.

Industrial disputes in the cotton industry during 1892–3 were ended by the signing of the Brooklands Agreement. Macara was a major architect of this agreement and it was used to provide rules for the settlement of future disputes by conciliatory methods not only in the cotton industry but throughout wider industry.

In 1911 he was created a baronet. He received many foreign honours, including Chevalier de la Légion d'honneur and Chevalier de l'Ordre de Léopold.

He died in Bucklow in Cheshire on 2 January 1929.

== Family ==
Charles Wright Macara
- Crest: A stag lodged reguardant in front of an oak tree Proper.
- Shield: Ermine an oak tree eradicated in bend dexter surmounted by a sword in bend sinister Proper hilt and pommel Or supporting on its point an imperial crown of the second on a chief of the third a spider Sable between two thistles also Proper.
- Motto: Consilia Non Vi

In January 1875 he married Marion Young (1848–1938), a cousin of Sir Henry Campbell-Bannerman of the Manchester firm of Henry Bannerman & Sons, cotton spinners and textile merchants.

Sir Charles and Lady Macara had two sons and four daughters. Their elder son William Cowper Macara (1875–1931) inherited the title. Their younger son Charles Douglas Macara (1885–1891) did not survive until adulthood.

== Selected publications ==
- The Freedom of Commerce in War. 1914.
- Social and Industrial Reform. 1918.
- Capital and Labour. 1918.
- Recollections, by Sir Charles W. Macara, Bart. London: Cassell. 1921.
- Getting the World to Work. 1922.
- The Industrial Situation. Bolshevism. Conscription of Wealth. 1922.

== See also ==
- Macara baronets

Baronetage of the United Kingdom
New creation	Baronet (of Ardmore); 1911–1929	Succeeded by William Macara
