= Lever baronets =

Set index for Lever baronets

There have been three baronetcies created for persons with the surname Lever, all in the Baronetage of the United Kingdom, and all now extinct.

- Lever baronets of Hans Crescent (1911)
- Lever baronets of Thornton Manor (1911): see Viscount Leverhulme
- Lever baronets, of Allerton (1920): see Sir Samuel Hardman Lever, 1st Baronet (1869–1947)
