= Thornton Manor =

Historic manor house in Merseyside, England

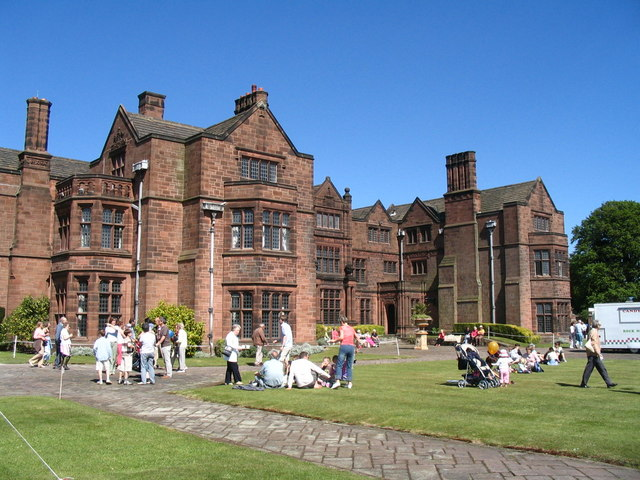
- Thornton Manor main front

- Location within Merseyside

General information
- Architectural style: Elizabethan style
- Location: Thornton Hough, Wirral, Merseyside, England
- Coordinates: 53.3276°N 3.0519°W
- Year built: Mid-19th century
- Renovated: c. 1896, 1913 (rebuilt)
- Client: Charles William Potts; William Lever

Design and construction
- Architects: Jonathan Simpson; Douglas & Fordham; J. J. Talbot; Grayson and Ould; J. Lomax-Simpson
- Designations

Listed Building – Grade II*
- Official name: Thornton Manor
- Designated: 2 December 1986
- Reference no.: 1075420

Thornton Manor is a large country house in the village of Thornton Hough, Wirral, Merseyside, England. It is recorded in the National Heritage List for England as a Grade II* listed building. The house was built in the middle of the 19th century, and has been altered and extended in a number of phases since. From 1888 until the end of the 20th century, the house was occupied by the Viscounts Leverhulme.

== History ==
The land on which the house stands was originally owned by the Mostyn family of North Wales. The land was bought in 1849 by Charles William Potts, a solicitor. It is thought that he built the house, but there is no evidence that he lived there. In 1863 Potts sold the house and land to Thomas Brittain Forwood, a businessman who died in 1884. His son, Sir William Forwood, chairman of Liverpool Overhead Railway, let the house in 1888 to William Lever (later 1st Viscount Leverhulme), builder of the soap factory and model village at Port Sunlight.

=== Leverhulme era ===
Thornton Manor became the home of the Viscounts Leverhulme. William Lever bought the house in 1893 and lived there from 1888 until 1919, retaining ownership until his death in 1925. Lever started on a series of alterations and additions soon after his purchase. The architect Jonathan Simpson made some minor alterations, but the first major work was designed by the Chester firm Douglas and Fordham in about 1896. This constituted the main block of the house and was in Elizabethan style.

In 1899 stables designed by J. J. Talbot were built; and around this time a kitchen and service quarters designed by Grayson and Ould were added. In 1902 a music room followed, also designed by Talbot, and this formed a new block to the northeast of the main block. The work on the music room was carried out by H.H. Martyn & Co. Two years later a temporary ballroom was built, which was later converted into a swimming pool. A porch was added to the south front in 1906, changing the main entrance to the house from the west to the south. A gatehouse designed by J. Lomax-Simpson was built in 1910; the base of this is in stone and its upper part is half-timbered.

A major reconstruction of the house took place in 1913, when Elizabethan-style wings were added to its west side; Lomax-Simpson was again the architect. In the process of the reconstruction, most of the work designed by Douglas and Fordham was demolished, leaving only two shaped gables and semicircular bay windows. Plans for further enlargement of the house were prepared by Lomax-Simpson, but these were not carried out because of the outbreak of the First World War. The 1st Viscount Leverhulme died in May 1925 and the house was inherited by his son, William, 2nd Viscount Leverhulme. He died in May 1949 and the house passed to his son, Philip, 3rd Viscount Leverhulme. Lord Leverhulme died in July 2000, and, the following year, the house was sold with planning permission to convert it into a hotel. The sale of the house contents in 2001 broke the UK record by raising £10 million.

== Architecture ==
The house is built in stone with slate roofs. It has three storeys and an irregular plan. The entrance front faces southwest and has protruding wings on both sides. Behind the house, at an angle towards the northeast, is the wing containing the music room. The windows are mullioned and a number of them are in canted, two-storey bays. The stables extend to the northwest.

== Grounds ==
The park was first laid out during Forwood's ownership. It included paths, a small summer house and a bridge. The gardens as they are now were planned by Thomas H. Mawson and the 1st Viscount. The kitchen garden contains a loggia dated 1912, and there is another loggia to the southeast of the house; both were designed by Lomax-Simpson. To the northeast of the house is a structure known as The Lookout, which was designed in 1896 by Douglas and Fordham. A lake lies to the west of the house. A system of tree-lined avenues was laid out in 1912–14 by Lomax-Simpson, and has a total length of about 5 miles (8 km).

== Present day ==
The manor house is now privately owned and is available to hire for weddings and events.

British Prime Minister Boris Johnson and Irish Taoiseach Leo Varadkar held private talks at Thornton Manor on 10 October 2019 in relation to Brexit.

On the evening of 5 February 2022, a substantial fire took hold in the main building, requiring the attendance of eight fire engines.

== See also ==
- Grade II* listed buildings in Merseyside
- List of houses and associated buildings by John Douglas
- List of works by Grayson and Ould
- Listed buildings in Thornton Hough
