= Philip Lever, 3rd Viscount Leverhulme =

British noble (1915–2000)

The Right Honourable The Viscount Leverhulme KG TD
- 1990 portrait by Carlos Luis Sancha

Lord Lieutenant of Cheshire
- In office 1949–1990
- Monarchs: George VI, Elizabeth II
- Preceded by: Sir William Bromley-Davenport
- Succeeded by: William Bromley-Davenport

Personal details
- Born: 1 July 1915
- Died: 4 July 2000 (aged 85)
- Spouse: Margaret Ann Moon (m. 1937; died 1973)
- Children: 3
- Parent(s): William Lever, 2nd Viscount Leverhulme; Marion Beatrice Smith
- Occupation: Racehorse owner

Philip William Bryce Lever, 3rd Viscount Leverhulme (1 July 1915 – 4 July 2000) was a British peer and racehorse owner.

== Early life ==
He was the only son of the 2nd Viscount Leverhulme and his first wife, Marion Beatrice Smith. He was born on 1 July 1915. He was educated at Eton College and Trinity College, Cambridge.

== Career ==
During the Second World War, he served in the Middle East with the Cheshire Yeomanry, and late became an honorary colonel. After the war, he managed his father's estates at Thornton Manor. In 1954, he bought the Badanloch estate, in Sutherland, Scotland.

In 1949, he inherited his father's titles and was appointed Lord Lieutenant of Cheshire that year, a post he held until 1990, making him the longest serving Lord Lieutenant in the country.

His lifelong passion was horse racing, the subject of his 1976 maiden speech in the House of Lords which can be read here: . A racehorse owner, he served as Chairman of Chester Racecourse and as a senior steward of the Jockey Club He was a supporter of the Animal Health Trust, a veterinary research establishment. He was Chancellor of the University of Liverpool from 1980 to 1993 and appointed a Knight Companion of the Garter in 1988.

== Marriage and issue ==
On 1 July 1937, he married Margaret Ann Moon (died 1973), and they had three daughters:

- The Hon. Susan Elizabeth Moon Lever (born 1938), married (Hercules) Michael Pakenham.
- The Hon. Victoria Marion Ann Lever (1945–2021), married (1) Sir Richard Pole, 13th Baronet, (2) Gordon Apsion, (3) Peter Tower.
- The Hon. (Margaret) Jane Lever (born 1947), married Sir Algernon Heber-Percy.

== Succession ==
He died on 4 July 2000. As Leverhulme was the last male descendant of the 1st Viscount and died without male heirs in 2000, his titles became extinct.

== Honours and decorations ==

Ribbon	Description	Notes
	Order of the Garter (KG)	Knight Companion; 1988
	Order of St John (KStJ)	Knight of Justice
	1939-1945 Star	
	Africa Star	
	France and Germany Star	
	Defence Medal	
	War Medal	
	Queen Elizabeth II Coronation Medal	1953
	Queen Elizabeth II Silver Jubilee Medal	1977; UK Version of this Medal
	Territorial Decoration (TD)	

Coat of arms of Philip Lever, 3rd Viscount Leverhulme
Crest A trumpet fesswise thereon a cock Proper charged on the breast with a rose as in the arms. Escutcheon Per pale Argent and barry of eight Or and Azure two bendlets Sable the upper one engrailed in sinister chief a chaplet Gules and in the dexter base a rose of the last leaved and seeded Proper. Supporters On either side an elephant Or charged on the shoulder with a rose Gules. Motto Mutare Vel Timere Sperno (I Scorn To Change Or Fear)

Honorary titles
Preceded by Sir William Bromley-Davenport	Lord Lieutenant of Cheshire; 1949–1990	Succeeded by William Bromley-Davenport
Peerage of the United Kingdom
Preceded by William Hulme Lever	Viscount Leverhulme; 1949–2000	Extinct
