= Scrimmage vest =

Clothing used in practices as a substitute for a sports uniform

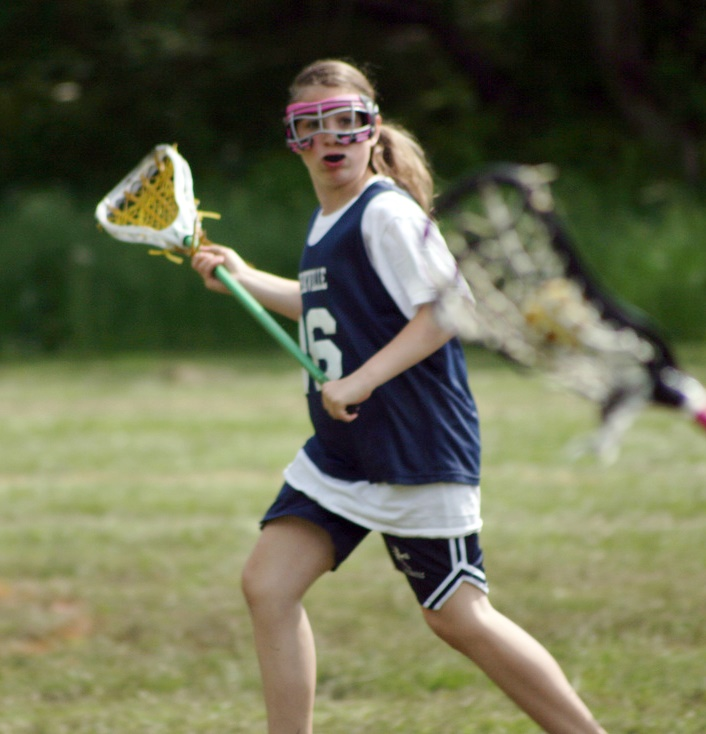
A lacrosse player wearing a scrimmage vest, the dark blue garment

A scrimmage vest, sometimes referred to as a pinny (NAE) or bib (BrE), is a piece of clothing or sportswear, often made of mesh, used in practices as a substitute for a sports team's usual uniform or to differentiate temporary teams in informal scrimmages. Some teams elect to have benched players wear them during a game. A vest can come in a variety of forms, including a racerback cut, collegiate cut, basketball cut or lacrosse pinny.

Vests are usually made from poly-mesh material. Screen printing or vinyl heat press artwork is often applied directly to the mesh. New techniques include dye-sublimation.

== See also ==
- Sportswear (activewear)
