= William Lever, 2nd Viscount Leverhulme =

British noble

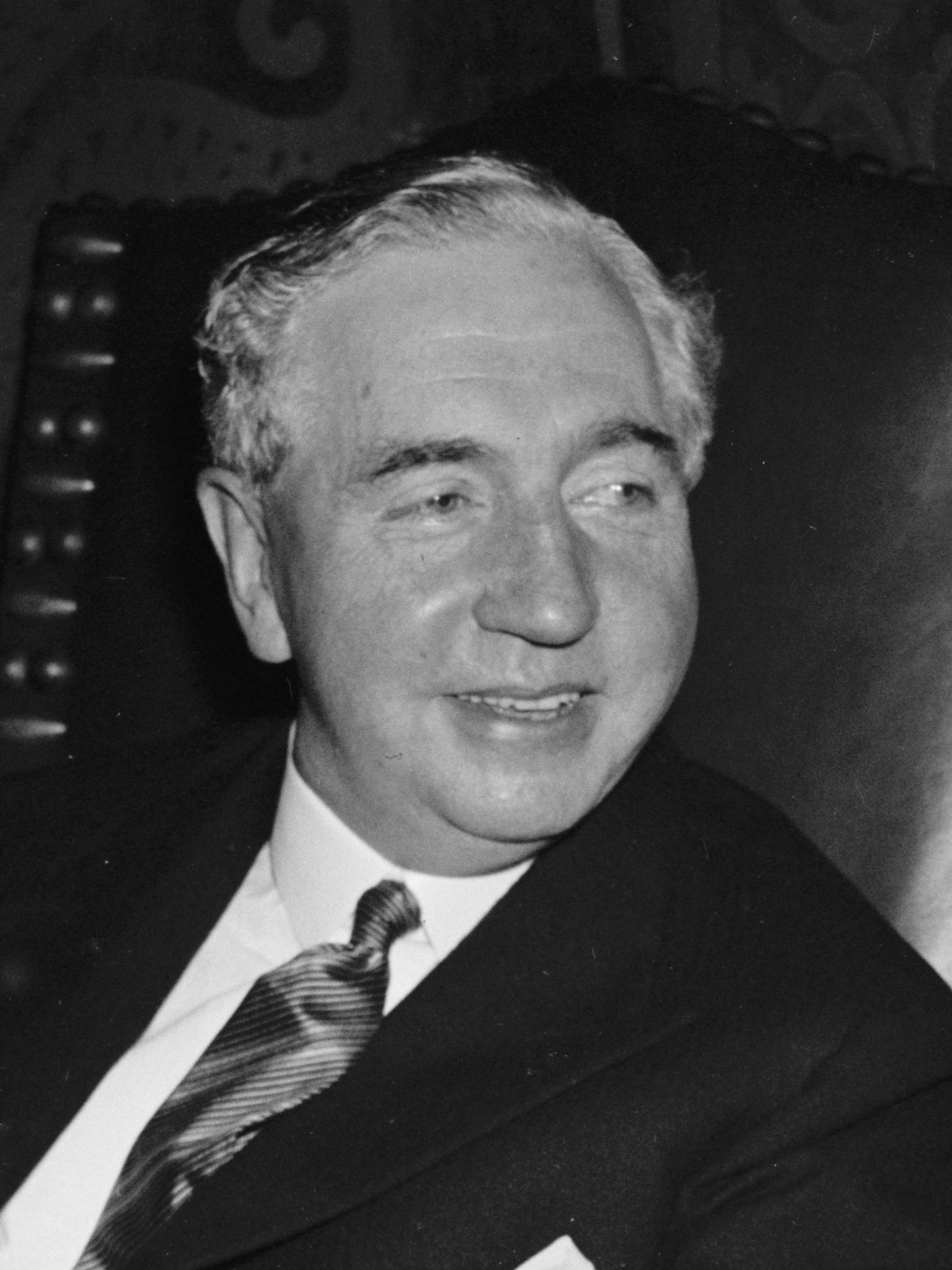
Viscount Leverhulme in 1938

William Hulme Lever, 2nd Viscount Leverhulme, DL (25 March 1888 – 27 May 1949), was the son of William Hesketh Lever and Elizabeth Ellen, daughter of Crompton Hulme of Bolton.

He was educated at Eton College and graduated from Cambridge University (Trinity College) in 1913 with a master's degree in the Arts. William Hulme Lever spent his early years at Thornton Manor which he inherited after his father's death in 1925.

== Family ==
He married twice. His first wife was Marion Beatrice Smith (6 July 1886 – 30 August 1987), daughter of Bryce Smith and whom he married 13 April 1912 and divorced in 1936. They had three children: Elizabeth Ruth Lever was born 9 April 1913 and died 16 April 1972; his son Philip William Bryce Lever, 3rd Viscount Leverhulme, was born 1 July 1915 and died 4 July 2000; his second daughter Rosemary Gertrude Alexandra Lever was born 23 April 1919 and died 16 October 1994. He married Winifred Agnes Lloyd, daughter of Lt. Col. J. E. Lloyd, on 20 January 1937.

== Business ==
The 2nd Viscount Leverhulme was a co-founder of Unilever in 1930. His company, Lever Brothers, merged with Margarine Unie that year.

=== Masonic movement ===
Due to the merger of the two firms, many staff employed at the Warrington factory were moved to London, including senior managers. This had the effect of disturbing attendance at the Masonic lodges in the Lever Brothers factory town, and as a result a new lodge was formed named the Mersey Lodge, no. 5434. The Petition to form Mersey Lodge was signed by the Master and Wardens of the Royal Alfred Lodge on 8 September 1933. As a result, Mersey Lodge was consecrated on 19 January 1934.

== Belgian Congo ==
Lever Brothers operated from the Belgian Congo beginning in 1911. In response to civil unrest by the Congolese, the company "demanded more troops, more police and more brutality. When the railway lines around the Congo River rapids were rebuilt between 1923 and 1932 the regime mobilised 68,000 forced labourers of which 7,700 died". Due to their involvement with the Belgian Congo, there was a stark contrast to how the Leverhulmes are remembered at home in England.

== Legacy ==
=== United Reformed Church of St Andrew and St George, Bolton ===
The 2nd Viscount Leverhulme's parents married at the United Reformed Church of St Andrew and St George in Bolton, on 17 April 1874. In 1936, William, 2nd Lord Leverhulme, paid for many improvements to the church, including widening the chancel and providing choir stalls, a communion table and a pulpit. He arranged for a new marble floor and the communion dais was finished with polished Hopton Wood Stone. The chancel walls and the organ gallery were lined with carved Austrian oak panelling. He paid for two stained glass windows, one illustrating the ‘Parable of the Talents’ in memory of his father, and another, 'The Resurrection Morning', in memory his mother.

== Appointments and honours ==
- Captain in the service of the 4th/5th Cheshire Regiment (Territorial Army)
- High Sheriff of Cheshire in 1923
- Governor of Lever Brothers and Unilever
- 2nd Viscount Leverhulme, of the Western Isles, cos Inverness and Ross and Cromarty, 7 May 1925
- 2nd Baron Leverhulme, of Bolton-le-Moors, co. Lancaster, 7 May 1925
- 2nd Baronet Lever, 7 May 1925
- Knight of Justice, Order of St. John of Jerusalem (K.St.J.)
- Justice of the Peace (J.P.) for Cheshire
- Office of Deputy Lieutenant of Cheshire
- Rank of Honorary Air Commodore in the service of the No. 919/923 (West Lancashire) Balloon Squadron, Royal Auxiliary Air Force
- Pro-Chancellor of Liverpool University between 1932 and 1936
- President of the Institution of Chemical Engineers 1932–3
- Awarded of Osborne Reynolds Medal in 1937
- Office of Mayor of Bebington in 1937
- Honorary degree of Doctor of Law (LL.D.) by Liverpool University in 1937.
- Rank of Honorary Colonel in 1941 in the service of the 4th Anti-Aircraft Division, Royal Army Service Corps

Coat of arms of William Lever, 2nd Viscount Leverhulme
| Crest A trumpet fesswise thereon a cock Proper charged on the breast with a rose as in the arms. Escutcheon Per pale Argent and barry of eight Or and Azure two bendlets Sable the upper one engrailed in sinister chief a chaplet Gules and in the dexter base a rose of the last leaved and seeded Proper. Supporters On either side an elephant Or charged on the shoulder with a rose Gules. Motto Mutare Vel Timere Sperno (I Scorn To Change Or Fear) |

== Death ==
Lord Leverhulme died on 27 May 1949 and is interred with his parents at Christ Church in Port Sunlight. A valuable bust, by Sir Charles Wheeler, of William, 2nd Viscount Leverhulme, was stolen in 2009 from the plinth near his parents' tombs in Christ Church, Port Sunlight. It is feared it may have been melted down for scrap.

Peerage of the United Kingdom
| Preceded by William Hesketh Lever | Viscount Leverhulme; 1925–1949 | Succeeded by Philip William Bryce Lever |
