= The New Frock =

Painting by William Powell Frith

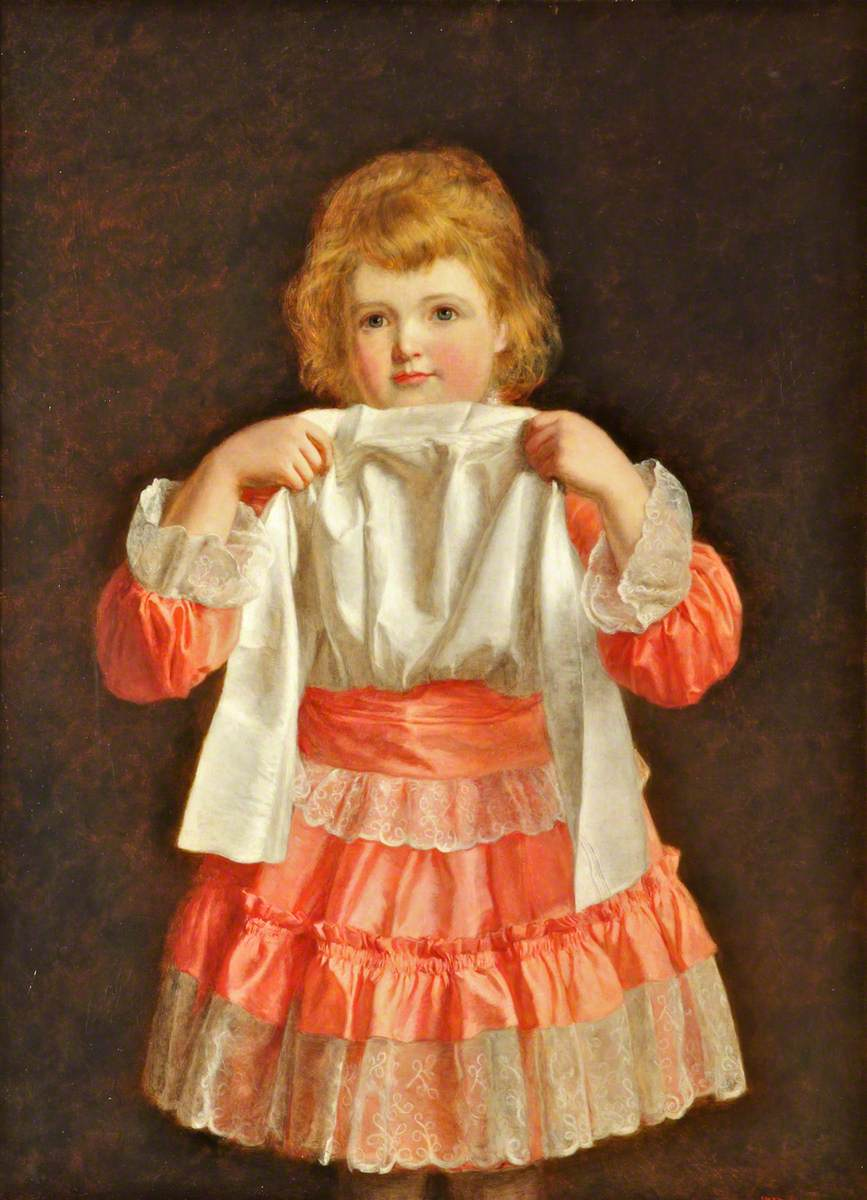
- Artist: William Powell Frith
- Year: 1889
- Type: Oil on canvas, genre painting
- Dimensions: 92 cm × 72 cm (36 in × 28 in)
- Location: Lady Lever Art Gallery, Merseyside

The New Frock is an oil on canvas painting by the British artist William Powell Frith, from 1889. It shows a young girl proudly showing off her new white pinafore. While Frith may have originally intended it as a gentle, light-hearted warning against vanity this original meaning was quickly lost.

Frith displayed the painting at the Royal Academy Exhibition of 1889 held at Burlington House in London. It was purchased by William Lever for 150 guineas. Lever then used it in advertisements for his Sunlight soap. Frith strongly protested at this use of his art for commercial use without his approval, but he had sold the copyright. It has drawn comparisons to the similar use of Bubbles by John Everett Millais by Pears soap. The painting was later donated to the Lady Lever Art Gallery in the Wirral in 1922.

== Bibliography ==
- Green, Richard & Sellars, Jane. William Powell Frith: The People's Painter. Bloomsbury, 2019.
- Macqueen, Adam. The King Of Sunlight: How William Lever Cleaned Up The World. Transworld, 2011.
- Newall, Christopher. Pre-Raphaelites: Beauty and Rebellion. Liverpool University Press, 2016.
- Wood, Christopher. William Powell Frith: A Painter and His World. Sutton Publishing, 2006.
