= François-Henri Lavanchy-Clarke =

Swiss cinematographer, philanthropist, and entrepreneur (1848–1922)

François-Henri Lavanchy-Clarke (1848–1922) was a Swiss cinematographer, philanthropist and entrepreneur. He is credited with having been the first cinematographer of Switzerland.

== Early life and education ==
He was born on 4 January 1848 in Morges into a family of winemakers from the Lavaux and was raised in Lutry and La Villette in the Canton of Vaud. After having studied law in Paris, he volunteered as a nurse and driver of an ambulance to the International Committee of the Red Cross (IKRK) when the Franco-German War broke out in 1870. He was deployed during the evacuation of Strasbourg and Orléans. Also in 1870 he began to train as a Christian missionary at the St.Chrischona in Bettingen. After a short stay in Southern France in the early 1870s he traveled by ship to Egypt where he, settled in Cairo. In Egypt he became involved in the welfare of the blind and in 1873 took part as the Egyptian delegate in the first international congress for teachers of the blind in Vienna, Austria-Hungary.

== Professional career ==
In 1878 he organized an International Conference for the Welfare of the Blind and the Deaf-mute. His service to the blind led him to several countries across Europe and in 1881 he established a training center for the blind in Paris. To finance the center, he organized evening parties in the Palais Trocadéro with singers like Sarah Bernhardt or Christine Nilsson. With Nilsson he bought the chocolate company L.Marquis using the profit to further finance initiatives for the wellbeing of the blind. He invested in coin-operated chocolate vending machines which he installed initially in France, and later in Swiss railway stations. To protect his machines against fraud, he invented a special mechanism.

=== Soap business ===
In 1888, he compelled William Lever, one of his donors to the welfare for the blind, to open a branch of Sunlight soap in Lausanne, Switzerland, as the first on the European mainland. Sunlight soap was new as it was sold in small portions and not in large blocks as the competition did. He was an avid promotor and for or the brand's launch, he organized an international laundress competition around Lake Geneva on Easter Monday 1889. In the competition, 700 laundresses were supposed to wash with Sunlight soap. The media was also included in the campaign as the journalist who wrote the most innovative article would also receive a price. Further he founded the periodically distributed Sunlight Almanach, which counted with the picturesque background of the Chillon Castle for the front page.

Promotional film featuring Sunlight Soap with a short appearance of François-Henri Lavanchy-Clarke.

Later he also produced a promotional film for the Sunlight soap with the members of his family as the actors. In 1898, the first continental Sunlight soap factory was opened in Olten, of which Lavanchy-Clarke was its first director. In 1900, he quit as he could not manage to multitask his several fields of interest. Later he settled in France and was the president of the board of the French branch of the Lever brothers until 1920.

=== Photography and film ===
He financially supported the chronophotographer Georges Demenÿ who had developed a machine that was able to project short films. In 1892, Lavanchy-Clarke, his father-in-law, the German chocolate-manufacturer Ludwig Stollwerck, and Demenÿ launched the Société Française du Phonoscope with the aim to make the developments in chronophotography useful for the deaf.

Lavanchy-Clarke claimed to also have developed a mechanism against fraud for the cinematographes of the Lumière brothers and in exchange, he received a license to roll a film in Switzerland as the first non-French citizen. In 1896 he received three Cinématographes Lumière with which he filmed movies at the Swiss National Exhibition in Geneva the same year. Later he toured Switzerland in an apparent soap cinematographic cooperation in which he screened the movies for free to children which produced a guarantee mark of the Sunlight soap. A publicity film of the Sunlight soap with his wife and sister-in-law as actresses was watched by 70,000 spectators in Geneva. In 1897 he filmed the procession of the Diamond Jubilee of Queen Victoria in London and also the visit of King Rama V of Siam in Bern. Around 1900, he appeared to have quit publicly screening movies.

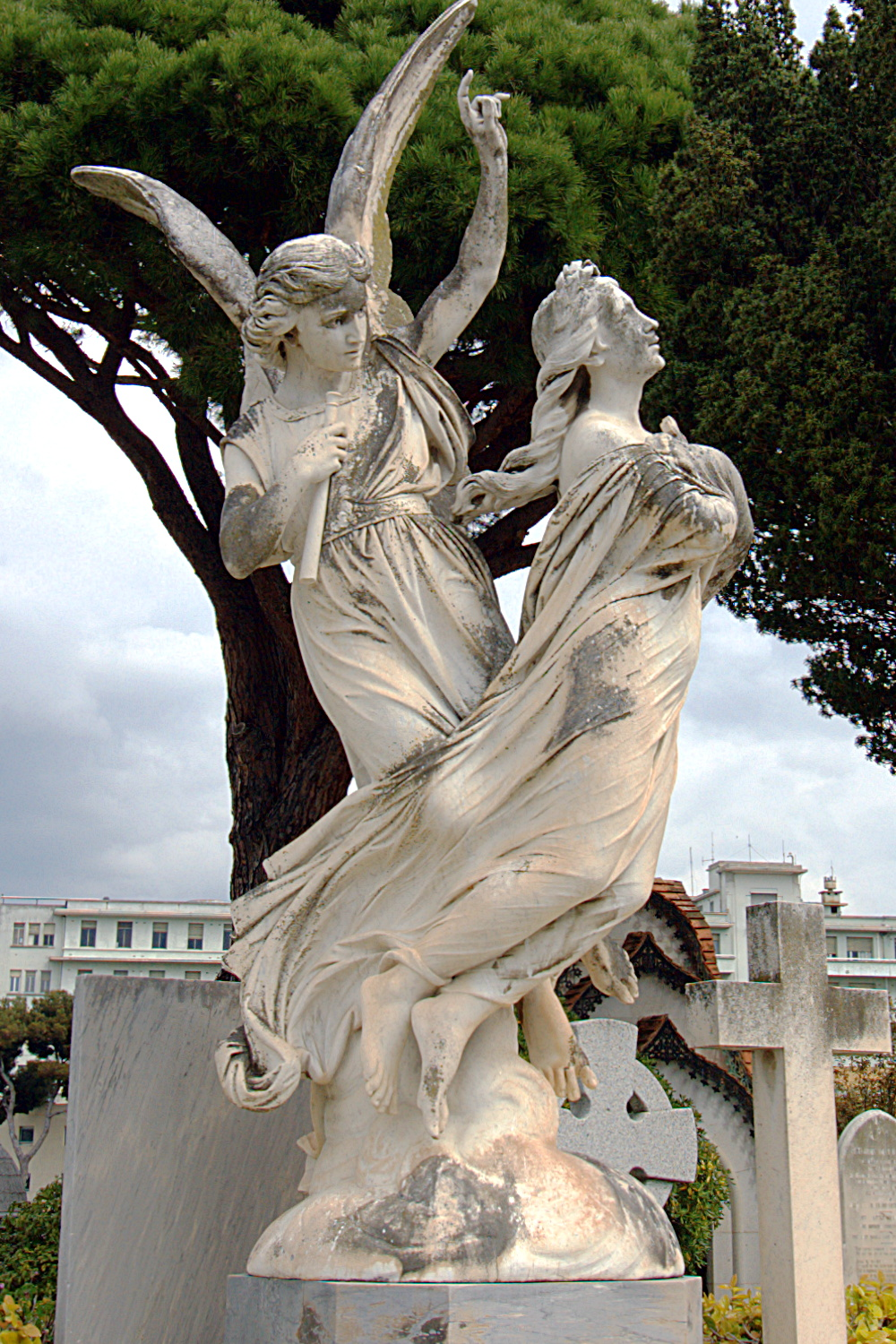
Grave of François-Henri Lavanchy-Clarke in Cimetière du Grand Jas, Cannes

== Personal life ==
During the International Conference for the Welfare of the Blind and the Deaf-mute he made the acquaintance of his future wife Jenny Elisabeth Clarke. The two married in Paddington in 1879 and from then on, he used the double-barrelled name Lavanchy-Clarke. Their children and his wife appeared in several of the movies he produced. His son Marmaduke died after he had contracted tuberculosis while being trained at Port Sunlight. Lavanchy-Clarke died on 11 May 1922 in Cannes and was buried in the Cimetière du Grand Jas.
