= Ladies Lifeboat Guild =

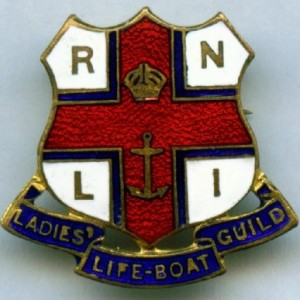
Credit: http://www.badgecollectorscircle.co.uk/

The Ladies Lifeboat Guild was formed to help raise money for the RNLI - Royal National Lifeboat Institution. Officially founded in 1921, the Ladies Lifeboat Guild is an association of women dedicated to fundraising to support the work of the RNLI.

== Background ==
Ladies Auxiliaries, groups of women supporting the RNLI through fundraising, existed before the formation of the Ladies Lifeboat Guild. Marion Macara is considered the founder of the Ladies Lifeboat Guild for her work encouraging women to fundraise for the lifeboat crews.

On 10 October 1886, Charles Macara and Marion Macara organised the first Lifeboat Saturday, the first recorded example of a charity street collection. Marion had already conscripted a group of women to help with the first Lifeboat Saturday. She then organised the ladies of Manchester and Salford into committees with the purpose of raising further funds. Lady Marion wrote letters to well connected ladies to encourage their support. The Mayoresses of Manchester and Salford's influence helped draw in other women to volunteer to help.

The November 1892 issue of the Lifeboat Journal encouraged women to ″...not wait to be asked to organise a committee, but take steps to organise one.″

== Formation ==
In May 1921 the Prince of Wales at the annual meeting announced that a Ladies’ Lifeboat Guild was to be formed in the RNLI's annual meeting. This was to connect the Ladies committees that had already been forming throughout the country. The guild was formally inaugurated at a meeting in Claridges Hotel in June 1921.

The Duchess of Portland, who had a long record of support, agreed to be president. A card of membership signed by the president was given to each lady. In the role of President of the Guild, the Duchess of Portland was followed by Princess Louise, Duchess of Argyll in 1924, and then by the Duchess of Sunderland in 1926.

By 1926, the number of guilds had expanded to 59 guilds all over the UK and Ireland.
