= Pinafore =

Sleeveless apron-like garment

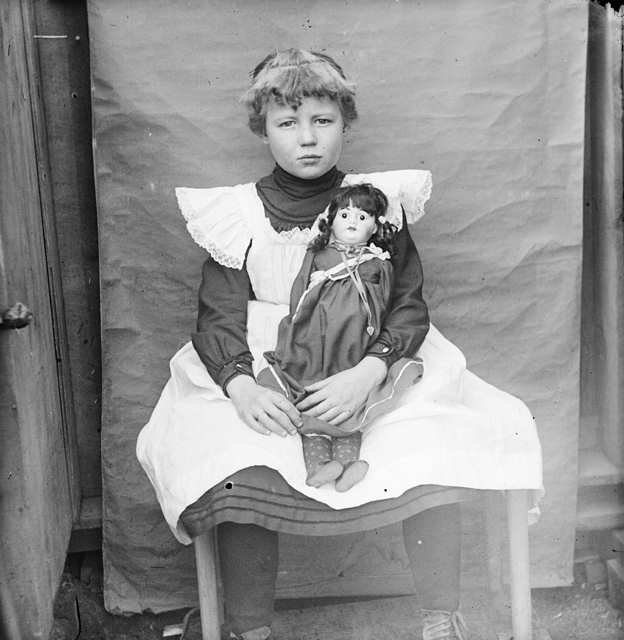
Girl wearing pinafore, Denver, Colorado, c. 1910

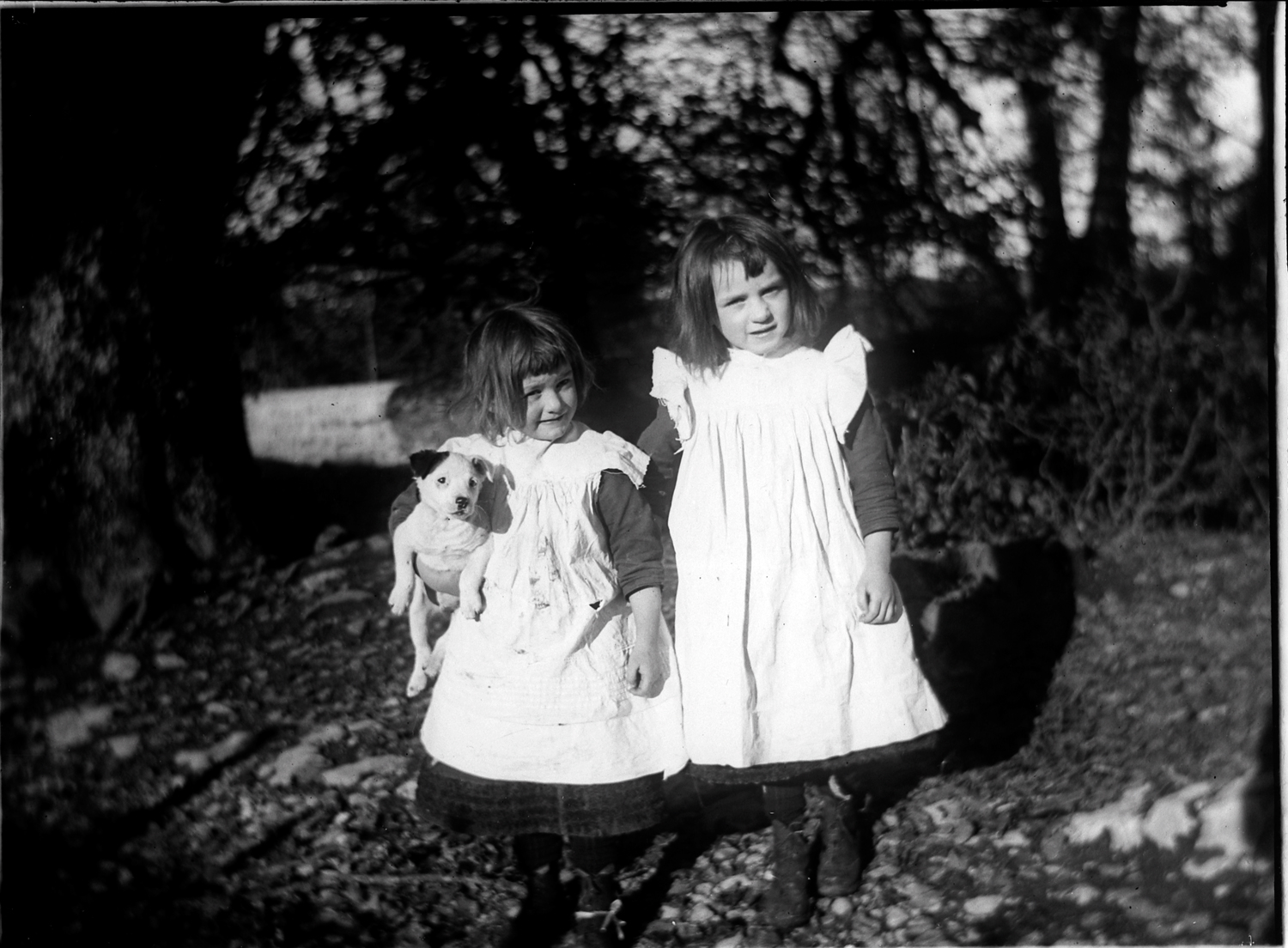
Two girls wearing pinafores, Ireland, c. 1903

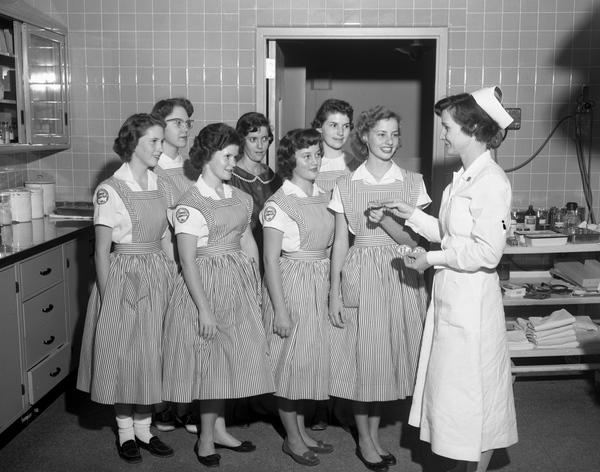
Candy stripers in training in Tallahassee, 1957

A pinafore /ˈpɪnəfɔːr/ (colloquially a pinny /ˈpɪni/ in British English) is a sleeveless garment worn as an apron.

Pinafores may be worn as a decorative garment or as a protective apron. A related term is pinafore dress (known as a jumper in American English), i.e., a sleeveless dress intended to be worn over a top or blouse. A key difference between a pinafore and a pinafore dress is that the former is open in the back. In informal British usage, however, a pinafore dress is sometimes referred to as simply a pinafore, which can lead to confusion. Nevertheless, this has led some authors to use the term "pinafore apron", although this is redundant as pinafore alone implies an apron.

The name reflects the pinafore having formerly pinned (pin) to the front (afore) of a dress. The pinafore had no buttons and was simply "pinned on the front".

== Distinctions ==
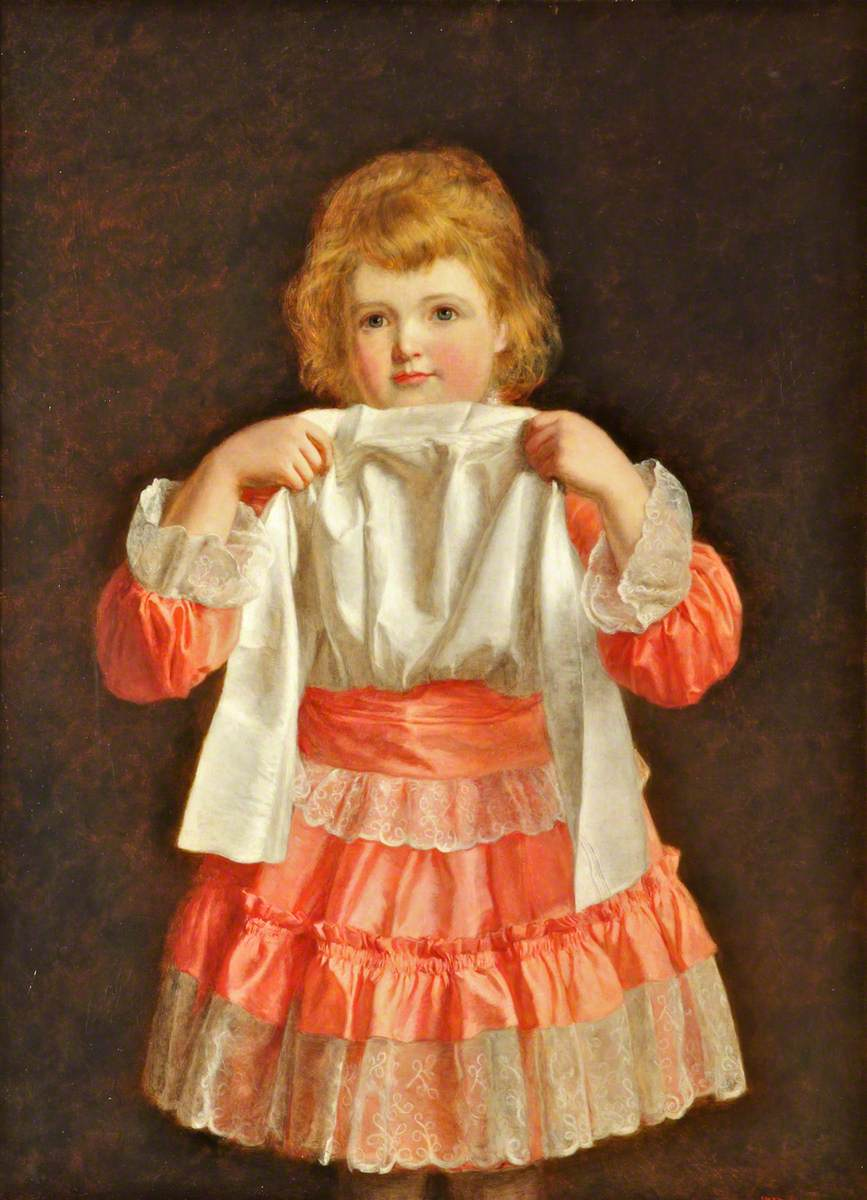
The New Frock by William Powell Frith, 1889

Pinafores are often confused with smocks. Some languages do not differentiate between these different garments. The pinafore differs from a smock in that it does not have sleeves and there is no back to the bodice. Smocks have both sleeves and a full bodice, both front and back.

A pinafore is a full apron with two holes for the arms that is tied or buttoned in the back, usually just below the neck. Pinafores have complete front shaped over shoulder while aprons usually have no bib, or only a smaller one. A child's garment to wear at school or for play would be a pinafore. More recently, other types of full or dress-like aprons are also occasionally referred to as pinafores. In particular, this is the case for an apron with a full skirt, bib and criss-cross shoulder straps.

Further confusion results from some foreign languages, which, unlike English, do not have a distinctive term for the pinafore. In German, for example, there is no precise term for "pinafore". Schürze means "apron" and thus Kinderschürze is used to describe a child's apron or pinafore (in contrast to the German word "Kittelschürze", which refers to an adult garment, typically worn by older women for housework tasks and cleaning).

In 19th century England the pinafore was considered an appropriate garment for girls but on reaching womanhood they were expected to wear aprons. The young narrator of Cousin Phillis by Mrs Gaskell is disturbed to notice, on first meeting his 17-year-old cousin, that she still wears a pinafore: "I thought it odd that so old, so full-grown as she was, she should wear a pinafore over her gown...A great tall girl in a pinafore, half a head taller than I was.." Later he notes: "Phillis left off wearing the pinafores that had always been so obnoxious to me; I do not know why they were banished, but on one of my visits I found them replaced by pretty linen aprons in the morning, and a black silk one in the afternoon."

In modern times, the term "pinny" or "pinnie" has taken another meaning in sportswear, namely a training tabard or scrimmage vest, double-sided short apron, often made of mesh, used to differentiate teams. This usage is chiefly seen in the United States and Canada. Tabards are also used by large retail stores to indicate employees.

== History ==
The pinafore was a type of apron that was pinned over the dress and easily removed for washing. Buttons were frequently damaged by lye soap, which was one reason why dresses were not laundered very often.

== In popular culture ==
- H.M.S. Pinafore, a comic opera by Gilbert and Sullivan, uses the word in its title as a comical name for a warship.
- At the Lowood School in Jane Eyre, the students are forced to make and wear their uniform which includes a pinafore.
- Alice, the eponymous heroine of Alice's Adventures in Wonderland, wore a white pinafore over a dress in John Tenniel's illustrations.
- Swedish author Astrid Lindgren, known for the Pippi Longstocking series, created a character, Madicken, who is often portrayed wearing a pinafore.

== See also ==
- Apron
- Overalls
- Smock-frock
- Tabard
- Pinaforing
