= Lever baronets of Hans Crescent (1911) =

The Lever baronetcy, of Hans Crescent in Chelsea, was created in the Baronetage of the United Kingdom on 8 February 1911 for the politician Arthur Lever. Born Arthur Levy, he assumed the surname of Lever in lieu of Levy by deed poll in 1896 and by Royal licence in 1911.

The 2nd Baronet was an author of historical works including The Life and Times of Sir Robert Peel (1942) and The House of Pitt (1947). The 3rd Baronet was a writer on nature and wildlife. The baronetcy became extinct on his death in 2021.

== Lever baronets, of Hans Crescent (1911) ==
- Sir Arthur Levy Lever, 1st Baronet (1860–1924)
- Sir Tresham Joseph Philip Lever, 2nd Baronet (1900–1975)
- Sir (Tresham) Christopher Arthur Lindsay Lever, 3rd Baronet (1932–2021)

== Extended family ==
- Maurice Levy, elder brother of the 1st Baronet, was created a baronet in 1913 (see Levy baronets).

== Notes ==
Baronetage of the United Kingdom
Preceded by Henry baronets	Lever baronets of Hans Crescent; 8 February 1911	Succeeded by Macara baronets
