= Macara baronets =

Extinct baronetcy in the Baronetage of the United Kingdom

- Escutcheon of the Macara baronets of Ardmore
- Creation date: 1937
- Status: extinct
- Extinction date: 1986
- Motto: Consilia Non Vi, By wisdom not by might
- Arms: Ermine an oak tree eradicated in bend dexter surmounted by a sword in bend sinister Proper hilt and pommel Or supporting on its point an imperial crown of the second on a chief of the third a spider Sable between two thistles also Proper.
- Crest: A stag lodged reguardant in front of an oak tree Proper.

The Macara Baronetcy, of Ardmore in St Anne-on-the-Sea in the County of Lancaster, was a title in the Baronetage of the United Kingdom. It was created in 1911 for the Lancashire cotton-spinner, Charles Macara. The title became extinct upon the death of the fourth Baronet in Dudley in 1986.

== Macara baronets, of Ardmore (1911) ==
- Sir Charles Wright Macara, 1st Baronet (1845–1929), cotton spinner. He was founder of the Lifeboat Saturday movement for the Royal National Lifeboat Institution, the first recorded charity street collection. His wife, Lady Marion Macara, founded the Ladies Lifeboat Guild.
- Sir William Cowper Macara, 2nd Baronet (1875–1931)
- Sir (Charles) Douglas Macara, 3rd Baronet (1904–1982)
- Sir Hugh Kenneth Macara, 4th Baronet (1913–1986). After his succession in 1982, his name never appeared on the Official Roll of the Baronetage. He died without heir.

== Notes ==
Baronetage of the United Kingdom
Preceded by Lever baronets	Macara baronets of Ardmore; 9 February 1911	Succeeded by Raphael baronets
