= Viscount Leverhulme =

Extinct viscountcy in the Peerage of the United Kingdom

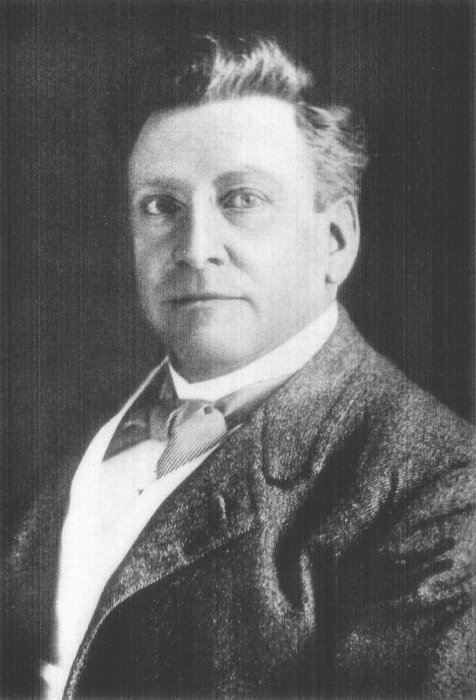
The 1st Viscount Leverhulme

Viscount Leverhulme, of the Western Isles in the Counties of Inverness and Ross and Cromarty, was a title in the Peerage of the United Kingdom created in 1922 for the industrialist and philanthropist William Lever, 1st Baron Leverhulme. He had already been created a baronet, of Thornton Manor in the parish of Thornton Hough in the County of Chester, in the Baronetage of the United Kingdom in 1911, and Baron Leverhulme, of Bolton-le-Moors in the County Palatine of Lancaster, in 1917, also in the Peerage of the United Kingdom.

His grandson, the third Viscount, was Lord-Lieutenant of Cheshire between 1949 and 1990 and Chancellor of the University of Liverpool from 1980 until 1993. The Philip Leverhulme Equine Hospital at Liverpool Veterinary School is named after him. He had three daughters but no sons and on his death in 2000 the titles became extinct.

The hulme section of the title was in honour of the 1st Viscount's wife, Elizabeth Hulme.

== Lever baronets, of Thornton Manor (1911) ==
- Sir William Hesketh Lever, 1st Baronet (1851–1925) (created Baron Leverhulme in 1917)

== Barons Leverhulme (1917) ==
- William Hesketh Lever, 1st Baron Leverhulme (1851–1925) (created Viscount Leverhulme in 1922)

== Viscounts Leverhulme (1922) ==
- William Hesketh Lever, 1st Viscount Leverhulme (1851–1925))
- William Hulme Lever, 2nd Viscount Leverhulme (1888–1949))
- Philip William Bryce Lever, 3rd Viscount Leverhulme (1915–2000))

== Arms ==
Coat of arms of Viscount Leverhulme
Crest A trumpet fesswise thereon a cock Proper charged on the breast with a rose as in the arms. Escutcheon Per pale Argent and barry of eight Or and Azure two bendlets Sable the upper one engrailed in sinister chief a chaplet Gules and in the dexter base a rose of the last leaved and seeded Proper. Supporters On either side an elephant Or charged on the shoulder with a rose Gules. Motto Mutare Vel Timere Sperno (I Scorn To Change Or Fear)

Baronetage of the United Kingdom
Preceded by Leon baronets	Lever baronets of Thornton Manor; 6 July 1911	Succeeded by Lonsdale baronets
