= Registered historic parks and gardens in Denbighshire =

List of landscapes in county of Wales

Denbighshire shown within Wales

Denbighshire is a county in the north of Wales. It covers an area of 844 km^{2} (326 sq mi) and in 2021 the population was approximately 96,000.

The Cadw/ICOMOS Register of Parks and Gardens of Special Historic Interest in Wales was established in 2002 and given statutory status in 2022. It is administered by Cadw, the historic environment agency of the Welsh Government. It includes just under 400 sites, ranging from gardens of private houses, to cemeteries and public parks. Parks and gardens are listed at one of three grades, matching the grading system used for listed buildings. Grade I is the highest grade, for sites of exceptional interest; Grade II*, the next highest, denotes parks and gardens of more than special interest; while Grade II denotes nationally important sites of special interest.

There are 27 registered parks and gardens in Denbighshire. Five are listed at grade II*, and 22 at grade II.

== List of parks and gardens ==
Grade	Criteria
I	Parks and gardens of exceptional interest
II*	Particularly important parks and gardens of more than special interest
II	Parks and gardens of national importance and special interest

List of parks and gardens
Name	Location Grid Ref. (Note: Sometimes known as OSGB36, the grid reference is based on the British national grid reference system used by the Ordnance Survey.) Geo-coordinates	Date Listed	Site type	Description / Notes	Grade	Reference Number	Image
Bachymbyd	Llanynys; SJ0933761123; 53°08′22″N 3°21′24″W	1 February 2022	Garden	Garden Remains of a 17th century walled garden. The house is surrounded by the garden, and the garden is built up, although dropping to a small pond on the north-east side of the garden.	II	PGW(C)27(DEN)	Bachymbyd
Bodelwyddan Castle	Bodelwyddan; SJ0016074596; 53°15′32″N 3°29′53″W	1 February 2022	Parks and gardens	Parks and gardens The landscape park was established in the 18th century, but took its modern form in the 19th century, with a later c. 1910 addition of an Arts & Crafts garden. Designed by Thomas Hayton Mawson, and is within the Bodelwyddan Castle estate. The park's grounds is largely grassland, with mature deciduous trees, particularly oak. Some parts have groups of trees or larger areas of woodland.	II	PGW(C)2(DEN)	View to Bodelwyddan Castle from the park
Bodrhyddan	Rhuddlan; SJ0442178782; 53°17′50″N 3°26′08″W	1 February 2022	Parks and gardens	Parks and gardens A Victorian formal garden, containing topiary and parterre in the south of the estate. The park developed from the early 18th century. Many areas are now pastures, spotted with deciduous trees. In the west, there is an informal woodland garden known as "The Pleasaunce", containing rough grass, trees, and ponds.	II*	PGW(C)54(DEN)	The Parterre garden at Bodrhyddan Hall
Brynbella	Tremeirchion; SJ0780472326; 53°14′24″N 3°22′59″W	1 February 2022	Parks and gardens	Parks and gardens A small late 18th century park and informal garden next to Brynbella Hall and other estate buildings. The garden's landscaping is from the 20th century, there is also a walled kitchen garden, and lawn area with an ornamental pond. There are woodlands around the estate.	II	PGW(C)23(DEN)	Aerial view of Brynbella's gardens
Bryntisilio	Llantysilio; SJ1982643461; 52°58′57″N 3°11′44″W	1 February 2022	Garden	Garden A small terraced garden from the late 19th century, with most of the gardens located to the west and north-west of the house.	II	PGW(C)20(DEN)	Bryntisilio
Colomendy	Llanferres; SJ2015862299; 53°09′07″N 3°11′43″W	1 February 2022	Parks and gardens	Parks and gardens Small late 18–19th park and garden, with woodlands and a walled garden. The park was laid out by 1839, roughly rectangular in shape, with woodlands and farmland to the north and east. There is a small garden to the south of the house, and late 18th–early 19th century "pleasure gardens" to the north and west.	II	PGW(C)70(DEN)	Colomendy
Eyarth Hall	Llanfair Dyffryn Clwyd; SJ1271754165; 53°04′39″N 3°18′16″W	1 February 2022	Garden	Gardens Garden terraces, embellished with an unusual rockwork which are a feature of the garden. The garden is found on wall-tops, above doorways, on gate piers, and in flowerbeds. The garden lies to the south of the Tudor house in a series of terraces, likely built with the house.	II	PGW(C)51(DEN)	Eyarth Hall from the south
Eyarth House	Llanfair Dyffryn Clwyd; SJ1259854825; 53°05′00″N 3°18′23″W	1 February 2022	Garden	Gardens 20th century naturalistic limestone rock garden and island beds forming the setting for the house. A natural rock garden is to the north-east of the house, with a lawn behind the rock garden.	II	PGW(C)34(DEN)	Eyarth House from the north-east
Foxhall Newydd	Henllan; SJ0297267613; 53°11′48″N 3°27′14″W	1 February 2022	Garden and woodlands	Gardens The earthwork remains of an early 17th century formal garden around Foxhall Newydd house. To the south-east is a walled garden, now partly a tennis court, while there are shallow earthworks, possibly that of a formal garden, to the north-west of the house.	II	PGW(C)32(DEN)	Foxhall Newydd from the east
Garthgynan	Llanfair Dyffryn Clwyd; SJ1429755368; 53°05′19″N 3°16′52″W	1 February 2022	Garden	Gardens A 17th century walled garden, adjacent to the house with it closed on the northern side and containing 31 small bee boles, a raised terrace and a banqueting house, with the latter two said to provide fine views. A terraced orchard and former ornamental fishponds are below the garden.	II	PGW(C)37(DEN)	Aerial view of Garthgynan
Gwaynynog	Denbigh; SJ0331265269; 53°10′33″N 3°26′53″W	1 February 2022	Parks and gardens	Parks and gardens A garden and small park, mainly set out in the late 18th century. Small mixed woodlands project from the garden. There is a late 18th century kitchen garden, featured in Beatrix Potter's children's books, as well as a small formal courtyard garden.	II	PGW(C)58(DEN)	Gwaynynog from the south
Kinmel Park	Bodelwyddan; SH9809275016; 53°15′44″N 3°31′45″W	1 February 2022	Parks and gardens	Parks and gardens Late 19th century medium-sized landscaped park containing a formal, and walled garden, as well as shrubberies. Kinmel Hall is centrally located in the park, while ruins of an earlier house, Old Kinmel, lie in the walled garden in the east, known as the 'old' park. There are terraced gardens of the park, and a 1875 western formal garden, the "Venetian Garden", containing a large circular stone fountain.	II*	PGW(Gd)54(CON)	Kinmel Parkland
Llannerch Hall	Waen; SJ0550272145; 53°14′16″N 3°25′02″W	1 February 2022	Garden	Garden Originally a c. 1660 garden, but overlain in the 1920s, but the modern garden is sparse. The original 1660s garden was an Italianate terraced garden, which was landscaped into a grassy slope by the late 18th–early 19th centuries. In the 1920s development, the original gardens were altered and enlarged, with formal gardens created around the house, woodland gardens in the north dingles, and a pleasure garden utilising the old walled garden.	II	PGW(C)41(DEN)	Llannerch Hall from the east
Llanrhaiadr Hall	Llanrhaeadr yng Nghinmeirch; SJ0851563408; 53°09′36″N 3°22′11″W	1 February 2022	Parks and gardens	Gardens A walled garden and landscape park of the 1770s, and layout dating to the 1840s. There is a dingle providing a picturesque walk to St Dyfnog's Well. The hall's garden is small, with its existing layout dating to the 1840s.	II	PGW(C)44(DEN)	Aerial view of the gardens of Llanrhaiadr Hall
Llantysilio Hall	Llantysilio; SJ1920043563; 52°59′00″N 3°12′18″W	1 February 2022	Parks and gardens	Landscape and garden The landscaped grounds contain a walled garden, dating to the 18–19th centuries.The walled garden is in the middle of the north-south axis between the house and an avenue. The square stone-walled garden was an addition built onto an earlier house, but later incorporated into the wider 19th century garden.	II	PGW(C)60(DEN)	Llantysilio Hall from the east
Nantclwyd House	Ruthin; SJ1230558150; 53°06′48″N 3°18′42″W	1 February 2022	Garden	Garden Town house garden of Nantclwyd House, which is located at its behind and L-shaped. Contains an early 18th century two-storey gazebo, while a lawn occupies most of the inner garden. The outer garden was formerly a Lord's Garden, serving as the medieval kitchen garden for Ruthin Castle.	II	PGW(C)53(DEN)	Lawn of Nantclwyd House
Pierce Memorial Garden	Denbigh; SJ0563066321; 53°11′08″N 3°24′49″W	1 February 2022	Garden	Garden A small Victorian commemorative garden dedicated to local doctor Evan Pierce. It contains a tall 72-foot (22 m) Tuscan stone memorial column dedicated to Pierce which centrally dominates the garden. The garden's layout has a rectangular lawn, gravel paths, trees (mainly conifers) and two ornate cast iron fountains.	II	PGW(C)66(DEN)	Lawn of Evan Pierce Memorial Garden
Plas Heaton	Trefnant; SJ0329269130; 53°12′37″N 3°26′58″W	1 February 2022	Parks and gardens	Parks and gardens A 19th century landscape park and informal woodland garden containing a circuit walk. The park contains several small ponds which are of a utilitarian nature. A Georgian sundial is present in the lawn to the south of the house, as is a brick-walled garden. While another walled garden is south of the woodland pleasure garden.	II	PGW(C)28(DEN)	Woodland near Plas Heaton
Plas Newydd, Llanfair Dyffryn Clwyd	Llanfair Dyffryn Clwyd; SJ1387055884; 53°05′35″N 3°17′15″W	1 February 2022	Parks and gardens	Parks and gardens A 17th century walled garden and a small 18–19th century park. The gardens have a rectangular open lawn, linked with a path, and an arch to another area with planting. There is a small formal parterre garden that is wedge-shaped to the east of the lawn, containing box-edged rose beds. While there is an old orchard located to the south of the garden.	II	PGW(C)39(DEN)	Plas Newydd from the south
Plas Newydd, Llangollen	Llangollen; SJ2185741635; 52°57′59″N 3°09′54″W	1 February 2022	Garden	Garden The gardens of Plas Newydd are now a public park in Llangollen, which contain most of the surviving structures of the late 18th–early 19th century gardens of the Ladies of Llangollen (Eleanor Butler and Sarah Ponsonby) in the Picturesque style. The gardens date to between 1780 and 1831, and are to the north-east, east and south of the house, in a roughly north-south elongated oval shape.	II*	PGW(C)48(DEN)	Gardens at Plas Newydd
Plas yn Iâl	Bryneglwys; SJ1721449055; 53°01′56″N 3°14′09″W	1 February 2022	Parks and gardens	Parks and gardens Small landscape park, which was laid out and planted in the 1820s by Elihu Yale. Claimed to be the highest historic park and garden in Wales at 300–370 metres (980–1,210 ft), and known for its trees. There is also a large rectangular walled garden and informal gardens.	II	PGW(C)78(DEN)	Plas yn Iâl from the north
Pool Park	Efenechtyd; SJ0976155740; 53°05′28″N 3°20′56″W	1 February 2022	Parks and gardens	Park Landscape park containing a garden terraced mound, as well as a c. 1820s kitchen garden, and derelict brick buildings in the park's east which served as a World War II prisoner-of-war camp. The kitchen garden is roughly inverse D-shaped. Beyond the house's forecourt on the eastern side is a large mound/mount, 3.5 metres (11 ft) high, which is partially planted with shrubs and trees as it was converted into a formal garden containing some cutting walks and terraces on some of its sides.	II	PGW(C)76(DEN)	Aerial view of Pool Park
Ruthin Castle	Ruthin; SJ1204557563; 53°06′29″N 3°18′55″W	1 February 2022	Parks and gardens	Gardens Mid 19th-century garden within the ruins of Ruthin Castle and a wider landscape park. The Castle Park is medium-sized and located to the south-west and west of the castle. The park may have medieval origins, but was clearly present by the early 16th century as "Ruthin Parke", with it extended in c. 1850. There are formal pleasure gardens within the castle ruins, with a path layout and fountain, which led it to be called the "Fountain Garden". There is a moat and a circle of Gorsedd stones.	II	PGW(C)13(DEN)	Some gardens within Ruthin Castle
St. Beuno's College	Tremeirchion; SJ0807274016; 53°15′19″N 3°22′46″W	1 February 2022	Garden	Garden A garden of a 19th century design, attached to a religious house and contains a terraced fruit and vegetable garden and a pleasure garden.	II	PGW(C)35(DEN)	St. Beuno's College's southside
Trevor Hall	Llangollen Rural; SJ2556542178; 52°58′18″N 3°06′35″W	1 February 2022	Garden and woodland	Garden A 17–18th century garden located in the grounds of Trevor Hall, which also contains a 19th century glasshouse, a summerhouse, and a walled garden. There is a small stone wall-enclosed pleasure garden and parkland-like areas nearby. Trevor Hall Wood is a woodland located to the western end of the park, with a mixture of deciduous and coniferous woodland. There is a stone bathhouse in the woodland.	II*	PGW(C)19(DEN)	Trevor Hall from the south
Valle Crucis Abbey	Llantysilio; SJ2049544123; 52°59′19″N 3°11′09″W	1 February 2022	Summerhouse	Summerhouse An 18th century Grade II listed summerhouse, with small rectangular pond, possibly used as a monastic fishpond, to its north, and both within the grounds of the Valle Crucis Abbey. The summerhouse is a two-storey cottage with stone and brick-rendering and a hipped slate roof at its northern end.	II	PGW(C)17(DEN)	Valle Crucis Abbey from the east
Vivod	Llangollen; SJ1911842343; 52°58′20″N 3°12′21″W	1 February 2022	Garden	Garden Within the grounds of Vivod, there is a contemporary park, woodland walks, and a garden containing shrubbery and terraces, as well as an adjacent former kitchen garden. The garden dates to the same period in which the house was built, between the 1850s and 1870s, while at the same time the woodland walks were laid out in the eastern dingle.	II*	PGW(C)65(DEN)	Vivod from the south

== See also ==
- List of scheduled monuments in Denbighshire
- Grade I listed buildings in Denbighshire
- Grade II* listed buildings in Denbighshire
