= James Watson (disambiguation) =

James Watson (1928–2025) was an American biologist and chemist, the co-discoverer of the double-helical structure of DNA, awarded the 1962 Nobel Prize in Physiology or Medicine.

James Watson may also refer to:

== Arts and entertainment ==
- James Watson (actor) (born 1970), British film and television actor
- James Watson (author) (1936–2015), author from Lancashire, England
- James Watson (engraver) (c. 1739–1790), Irish engraver
- James Sibley Watson (1894–1982), American publisher and early experimenter in motion pictures
- James Watson (trumpeter) (1951–2011), British trumpet player, conductor, and professor at the Royal Academy of Music
- James Aaron Watson (born 1977), country musician

== Law ==
- James F. Watson (1840–1897), American attorney and judge
- James Lopez Watson (1922–2001), U.S. federal judge, first black judge to head a federal court in the South
- James S. Watson (1882–1952), first black judge elected in New York State

== Military ==
- James Watson (British Army officer) (1772–1862), Commander-in-Chief in India
- James Watson (American soldier) (1850–?), American soldier who fought in the Battle of Little Bighorn
- James A. Watson (born 1956), rear admiral in the U.S. Coast Guard

== Politics ==
- James Watson (Australian politician) (1837–1907), colonial treasurer of New South Wales, 1878–1883
- James Watson (Shrewsbury MP) (1817–1895), English merchant, dairy herdsman, and Conservative politician, House of Commons 1885–92
- James Watson (Bridport MP), English politician, House of Commons 1790–95
- James Watson (New York politician) (1750–1806), U.S. Senator from New York
- James Cameron Watson (1891–1986), Canadian politician, mayor of Calgary
- James Eli Watson (1864–1948), U.S. Congressman and Senator from Indiana
- James H. Watson (1845–1908), English-born merchant and political figure in Newfoundland
- James W. Watson (1849–?), Scottish-born Wisconsin state assemblyman

== Scientists and scholars ==
- James Craig Watson (1838–1880), Canadian-American astronomer
- James Wreford Watson (1915–1990), Scottish/Canadian geographer and cartographer
- James L. Watson (anthropologist) (born 1943), American professor of anthropology at Harvard
- James Watson (Scottish chemist) (1859–1923), Scottish chemist and political activist
- Sir James Anderson Scott Watson (1889–1966), Scottish agriculturalist
- James Kay Graham Watson (1936–2020), molecular spectroscopist

== Sport ==
- James Watson (footballer, born c. 1883) (1879–1911), Scottish footballer (Sunderland AFC and Middlesbrough FC)
- James Watson (Rangers footballer) (1855–1915), Scottish footballer (Rangers FC and Scotland)
- James Watson (wrestler) (born 1973), professional wrestler who used the pseudonym Mikey Whipwreck
- James Watson (boxer) (born c. 1918), Scottish boxer

== Other ==
- James Watson (printer) (1644–1722), Scottish printer and publisher
- James Watson (surgeon) (1766?–1838), British radical and surgeon
- James Watson (radical) (1799–1874), English publisher, activist, and Chartist
- James Watson (murderer) (born 1981), English murderer

== See also ==
- Jamie Watson (disambiguation)
- Jim Watson (disambiguation)
