= Chain Bridge (Berwyn) =

Footbridge in Llangollen, Denbighshire, Wales

Coordinates: 52.980407°N 3.194792°W

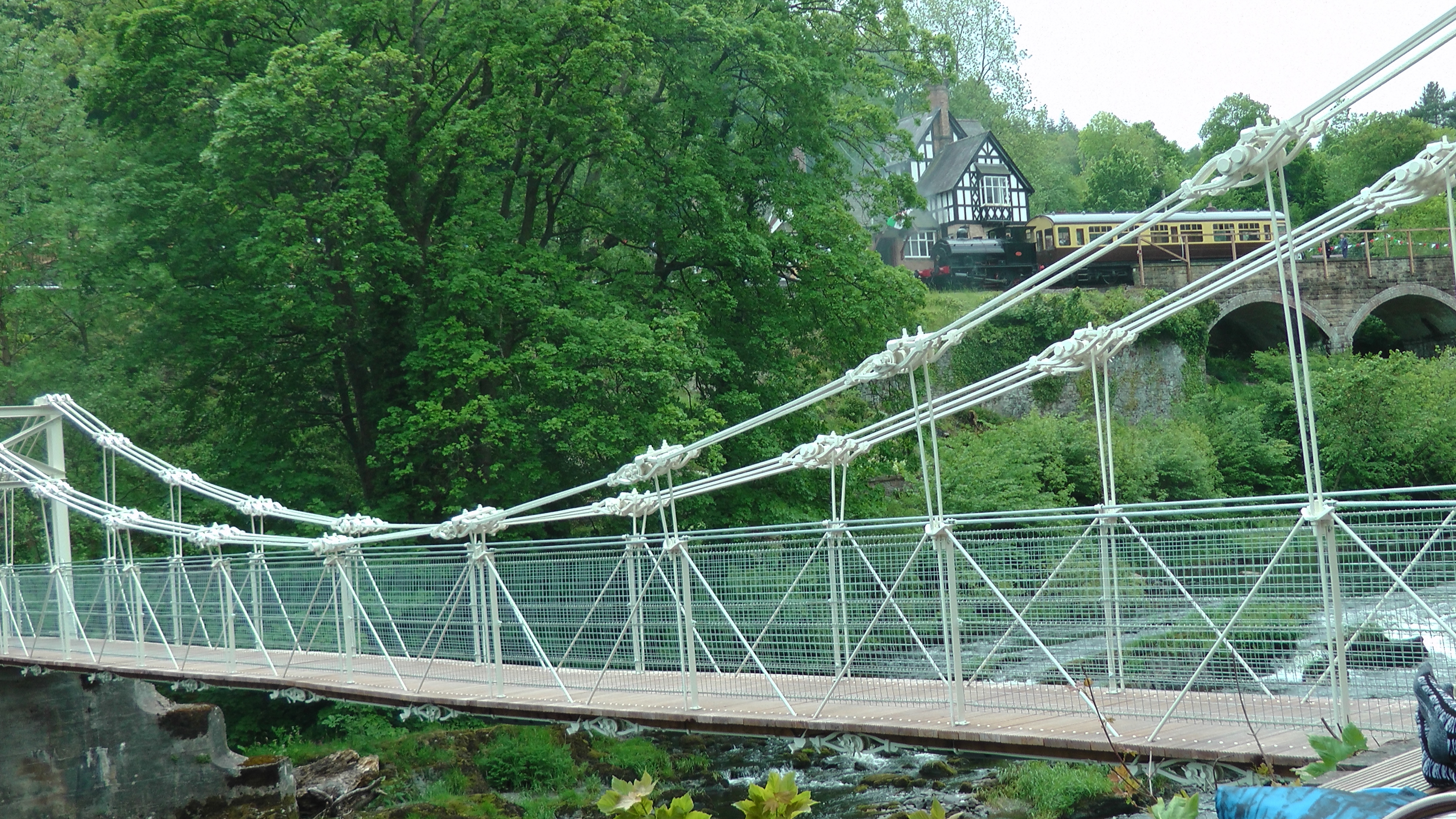
Chain Bridge 2015

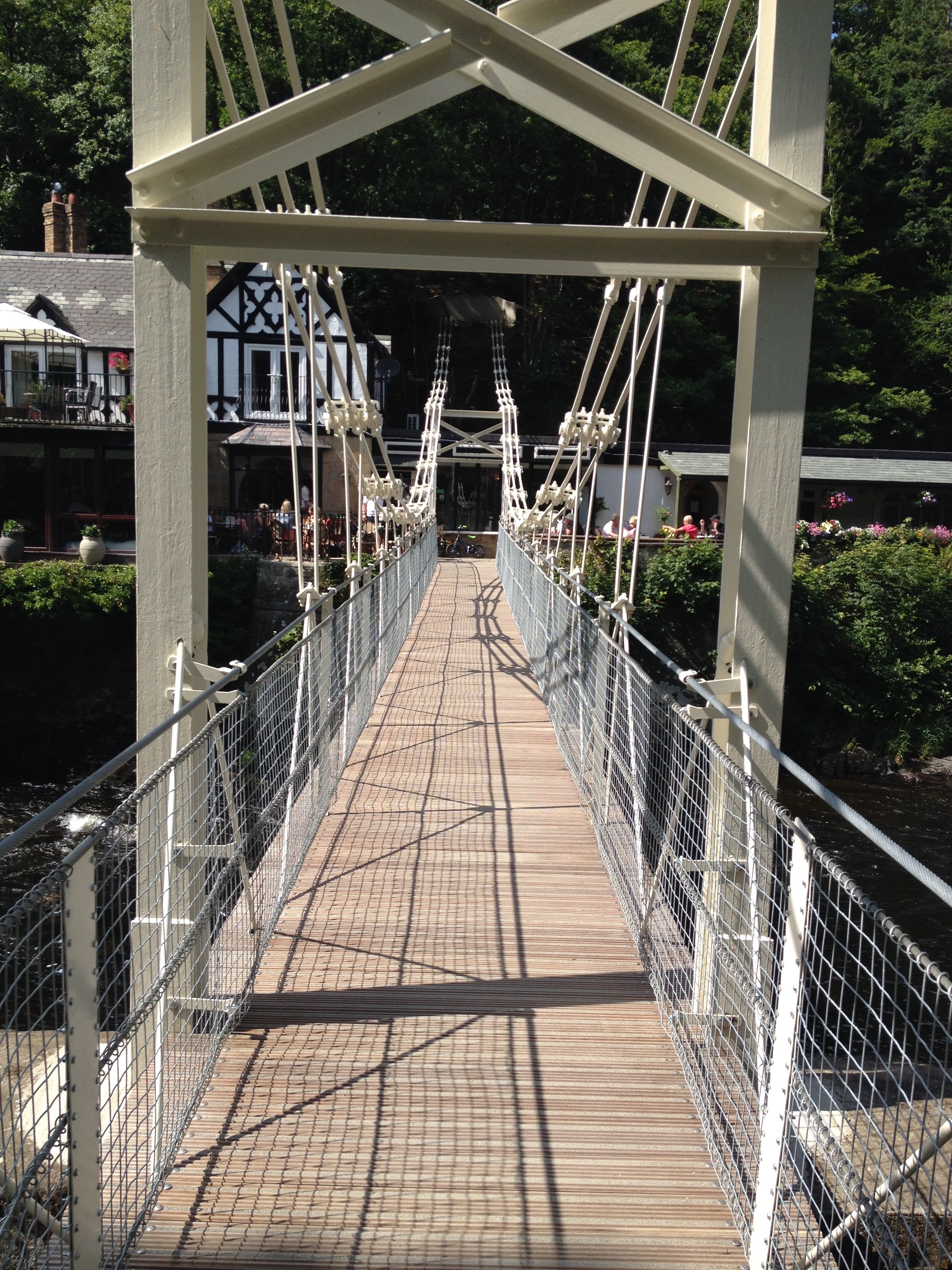
Chain Bridge 2015

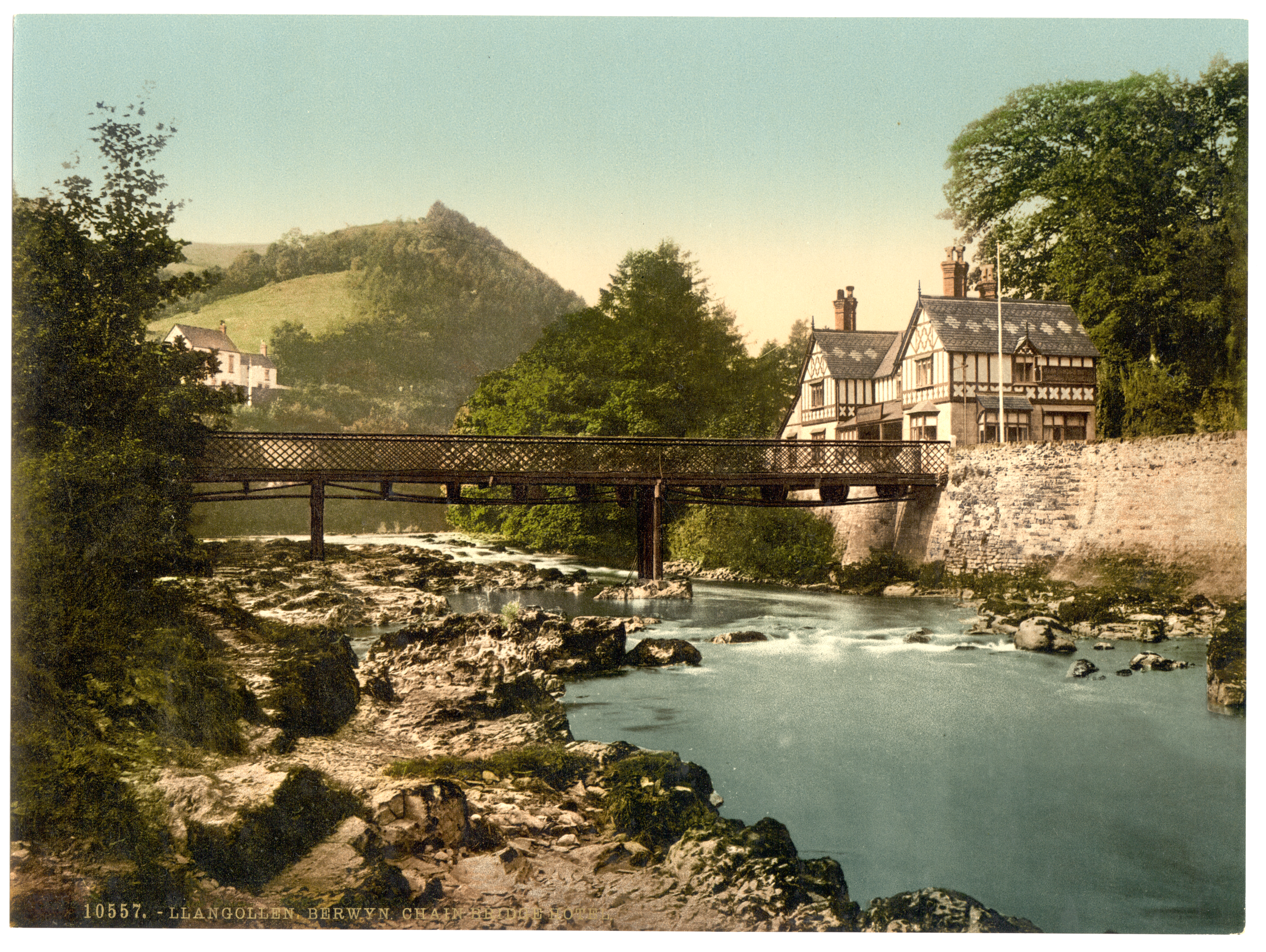
The Henry Robertson Chain Bridge Built 1870

The Chain Bridge is a footbridge over the River Dee at Berwyn, Llangollen, Denbighshire, north Wales.

Is owned by Llangollen Town Council and a pathway from Berwyn railway station, now part of the Llangollen Railway, leads under a subway and down to the bridge and to the Chain Bridge Hotel on the other side.

The current bridge is the third such bridge, and was built by Sir Henry Beyer Robertson, following the destruction of the previous second chain bridge during severe flooding.

== First bridge ==
The first chain bridge was built by Exuperius Pickering in order to transport coal, lime, stone, etc. from the Shropshire Union Canal, (Llangollen Canal) across the Dee to Telford's recently completed London to Holyhead road. The bridge allowed Pickering to bypass the Llangollen toll bridge further downstream, and transport coal from his mines near Acrefair up the canal and onwards to Corwen. Permission to build it was granted in 1814 and it was completed by 1818, making it one of the first chain bridges in the world.

== Second bridge ==
The second bridge was built by railway engineer and industrialist Henry Robertson in 1876 using the existing chains of the first bridge.

== Third bridge ==
Henry Robertson's son, Sir Henry Beyer Robertson was the head of Brymbo steel works, near Wrexham, in 1929, and a director of the Great Western Railway. He owned the nearby Llantysilio Hall estate, which had been bequeathed to him by the German-born locomotive engineer, Charles Beyer (Beyer was his godfather and had no children of his own). His father Henry Robertson provided loan funding to help found locomotive builder Beyer, Peacock & Company, at Gorton Foundry, Manchester (then-largest locomotive works in the country).

The chain bridge was rebuilt as a suspension footbridge reusing some of the existing chains. In 2015 its complete restoration after years of neglect was completed and it is a major tourist attraction.
