= Llantysilio Hall =

Country house in Denbighshire, Wales

Coordinates: 52.9844°N 3.2059°W

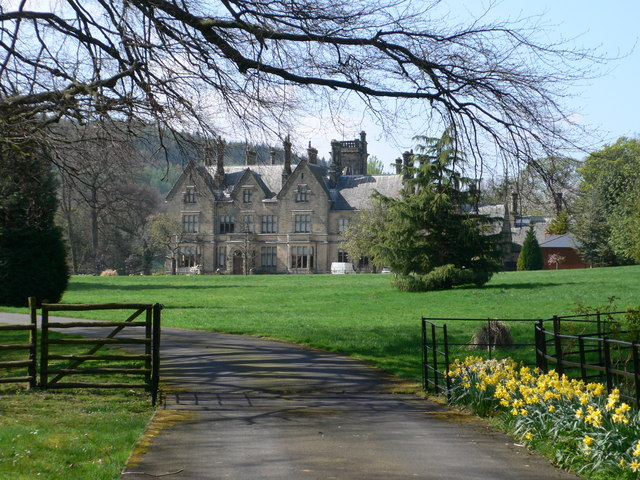
Llantysilio Hall, Denbighshire

Llantysilio Hall is a Grade II* listed country house in Llantysilio, near Llangollen in Denbighshire. It is on the bank of the River Dee and adjacent to the historic Horseshoe Falls, the source of the Llangollen Canal (the eleven miles of the canal to Chirk is a World Heritage site).

The estate was purchased by the Victorian locomotive designer and builder Charles Beyer in 1867. He was co-founder of Beyer, Peacock & Company, one of the world's leading locomotive manufacturers. Beyer, a bachelor, built the 25-bedroom mansion house, soon after his business partner, Henry Robertson, rebuilt nearby Palé Hall, Llandderfel. Samuel Pountney Smith of Shrewsbury was the architect.

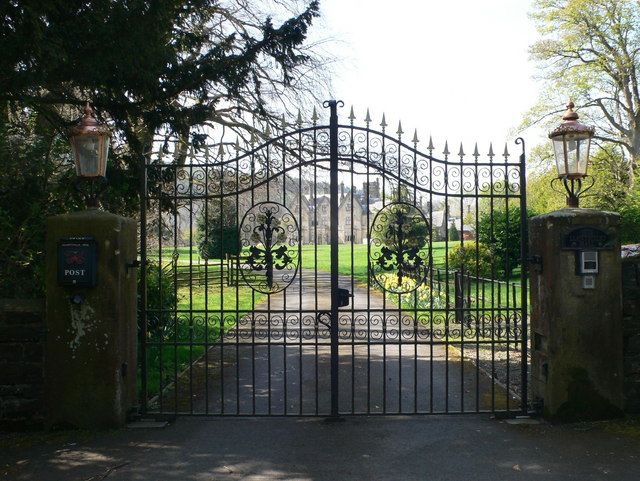
Gates

The hall was lavishly decorated. For example, the larger, south-facing, drawing room has a Carrara marble chimneypiece with giallo antico columns and three cameos in the frieze, of Queen Victoria, Robertson's wife (formerly Elizabeth Dean of Brymbo Hall, who met Queen Victoria at Palé Hall when her son – and Beyer's godson – Henry Beyer Robertson played host and was subsequently knighted), and Shakespearean actress Helena Faucit (Beyer's nearest neighbour, at Bryntysilio Hall, with her husband Sir Theodore Martin, author of the official biography of Prince Albert, Life of the Prince Consort). The smaller room has a similar chimneypiece depicting Kaiser Wilhelm I, Otto von Bismarck, and Helmuth von Moltke the Elder. These pieces were probably made c. 1874, some three years after the start of the German Empire.

Charles Beyer died at Llantysilio Hall on 2 June 1876. He was buried at Llantysilio Church, in the grounds of his estate.

Henry Robertson was the head engineer of the Llangollen and Corwen Railway and he also owned and rebuilt the Chainbridge hotel and rebuilt the historic chain bridge, which is a short distance down the river bank. Rob old hall was demolished in 1875.

When Beyer died the estate was bequeathed to his godson Sir Henry Beyer Robertson (Henry Robertson's son). Sir Henry Robertson became head of Brymbo Steelworks, responsible for its rescue in the 1930s and the development of the new blast furnaces. He was also a director of the Great Western Railway.
