= Peter Thompson (Medal of Honor) =

- Born: December 28, 1854; Fife, Scotland
- Died: December 3, 1928 (aged 73); Hot Springs, South Dakota, US
- Military career
- Allegiance: United States
- Branch: United States Army
- Service years: 1875 - 1880
- Rank: Private
- Units: Company C, 7th U.S. Cavalry
- Conflicts: Indian wars
- Awards: Medal of Honor

Peter Thompson (September 1, 1853 – December 3, 1928) was a Scots-American soldier who was awarded a Medal of Honor for his actions at the Battle of the Little Bighorn.

== Biography ==
Thompson was born in Markinch in Fife, Scotland. After emigrating with his family to the United States in 1865, Thompson lived near Pittsburgh, and later in Indiana County, PA, where he worked as a miner. He enlisted in the United States Army in September 1875, serving in the U.S. 7th Cavalry Regiment's C company from 1875 until 1880. His commanding officer was Capt. Thomas Custer. After an honorable discharge, he resided first in Lead, SD, where he worked at the Homestead Mine. Later he moved to Alzada, MT, where he became a rancher. He married Ruth Boicourt in 1904. They had two children, Susan and Peter Jr., born in 1906 and 1909. Thompson died on December 3, 1928, at Hot Springs, SD, of heart failure.

== Little Big Horn ==
In 1876, while serving under George Armstrong Custer in the eastern Montana Territory, he took part in the Battle of the Little Bighorn. Had his horse not given out on the bluffs above the river as the regiment reached the battlefield, Thompson would have died with Custer. As it was, Thompson and a companion named James Watson fell behind, but continued on toward the river. Unable to rejoin their own company, the two later climbed back up the bluffs and joined surviving elements of the regiment, under Major Marcus Reno. Thompson took part in other parts of the battle and was wounded in the hand and arm. In spite of his wounds, he made trips outside the lines to obtain water for the wounded, an act that gained him one of 24 Medals of Honor awarded for the battle.

After the fight, he was evacuated to Fort Abraham Lincoln by steamboat. When his hand had recovered sufficiently, he wrote a lengthy account of the fighting. Notably, he said he had been in a hiding place from which he had seen Custer near the river, and had also witnessed the beginning of the fight in which Custer was killed. By implication, he may have been the last white man to have seen Custer alive.

== Controversy over Thompson's story ==
Thompson was interviewed by the respected Indian Wars researcher Walter Mason Camp at the Little Bighorn Battlefield in 1909. Camp, who met with Thompson on other occasions and corresponded him for many years, was unable to reconcile Thompson's account with what he had learned from other participants and records. Thompson published his controversial 26,000 word account in his regional newspaper, the Belle Fourche, South Dakota Bee in the spring of 1914. This was an era when a number of old men (or deceased men, through their obituaries) claimed to have been "the last survivor" of Custer's Last Stand. Thompson would later have confrontations with other battle participants, and be accused of being a liar. He was so labeled by one veteran named William Slaper in a 1925 book, A Trooper with Custer, edited by Earl A. Brininstool. Thompson's attempts to prove his claims were frustrated by the unknown whereabouts of James Watson.

Peter Thompson died in Hot Springs, South Dakota, and was interred in the West Lead Cemetery in Lead, South Dakota.

Thompson's story has received significant attention in recent years. Daniel O. Magnussen wrote in 1974 that, while Thompson seemed to have been an honest man, his account was riddled with errors. He speculated that Thompson's memory may have been clouded by hallucinations brought on by stress and his wound. More recently, the publication of Camp's notes has again stimulated interest in Thompson's story, and provided corroboration for many controversial parts of the account. Like Curley's stories of the Little Bighorn, Thompson's account remains a fascinating enigma.

== Medal of Honor citation ==
Rank and organization: Private, Company C, 7th U.S. Cavalry. Place and date: At Little Big Horn, Mont., June 25, 1876. Entered service at: Pittsburgh, Pa. Birth: Scotland. Date of issue: October 5, 1878.

Citation:

After having voluntarily brought water to the wounded, in which effort he was shot through the hand, he made two successful trips for the same purpose, notwithstanding remonstrances of his sergeant.

== See also ==
- List of Medal of Honor recipients for the Indian Wars
