= James Watson (American soldier) =

American soldier

James Watson (born c. 1850) was an American soldier in Custer's battalion during the time of the Battle of the Little Bighorn but did not participate in the battle having been unable to keep up because his horse gave out and he thus survived the battle.

== Life ==
Watson was born in Hudson, New York, in about 1850. His mother was from Ohio and his father from New York. He worked as a laborer.

Watson enlisted in the 7th U.S. Cavalry in 1875 in Cincinnati, Ohio. He was assigned to Company C under Captain Thomas W. Custer. He participated in the Battle of the Little Bighorn on June 25–26 June 1876, where, as his company approached the bluffs overlooking the river, Watson's horse and that of another man, Peter Thompson, gave out. Watson was able to revive his horse up again, but the two men were unable to keep up with their company, which was in a battalion under the command of Lt. Col. George Armstrong Custer. Watson and Thompson continued on to the river, but were unable to rejoin Custer. They returned to the bluffs and joined the remaining elements of the regiment under Maj. Marcus Reno.

== Historical source ==
Watson survived the battle and later spoke with members of his company about his adventures with Thompson at the Little Bighorn while separated from the regiment. He was discharged from the army in 1880. He suffered from a significant respiratory illness, which may have been asthma or tuberculosis. He returned to the Midwest by train with a private from another company, William Slaper, who later recalled that Watson was intending to go to Grand Rapids, Michigan. No record of Watson's later life has been found. The Indian Wars historian Walter Mason Camp, investigating Thompson's curious account, attempted to locate Watson, without success.

Many years later, Slaper told the journalist and Western historian E. A. Brininstool that he and Watson were friends, but that Watson did not tell him of any adventure with Peter Thompson at the Little Bighorn. Slaper's conclusion was that Thompson had made up the story. Brininstool published Slaper's account in Troopers with Custer in 1925.
