= Berwick House =

Listed building in Shropshire

Coordinates: 52.7282°N 2.7855°W

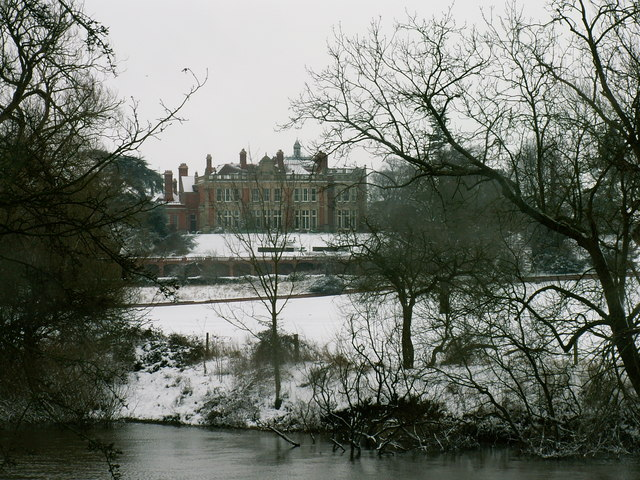
Berwick House. Looking at Berwick House from across the River Severn

Berwick House is a Georgian country house on the banks of the River Severn, in the civil parish of Bomere Heath and District, north of Shrewsbury, in Shropshire, England.

The house dates from the 1700s, and is listed at Grade II*.

There was once a fine pair of fine wrought-iron gates by Robert Davies of Wrexham in the park to the south-east of the house, which are now at Newnham Paddox in Warwickshire.

== Battle of Shrewsbury and Hotspur Legend ==
The land associated with the house is linked with the Battle of Shrewsbury, which is commemorated by William Shakespeare in Henry IV, Part 1, in Acts IV (Scenes 1 and 3) and V (Scenes 1–5)

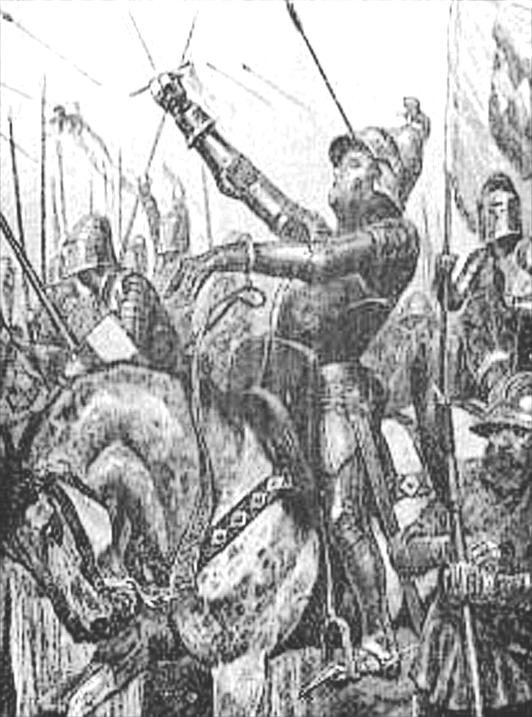
Henry Percy ("Hotspur") lost his favourite sword at Berwick according to legend

It is understood that Hotspur and his forces slept overnight near Berwick. A legend says that when the forces were marshalled on the morning of battle, he suddenly discovered that he was without his favourite sword which was left behind at Berwick, upon hearing this he became agitated and exclaimed, "I perceive that my plough is drawing to its last furrow, for a wizard in Northumberland told me that I should perish at Berwick, which I understood to refer to Berwick in the north.” The Wizard's prophecy appears to have been fulfilled, for the gallant soldier fell a victim to his enemies and died on the field of battle.

== Notable former residents ==
- Basil Feilding, 7th Earl of Denbigh (1796–1865), was born there.
- James Watson (1817–1895), MP for Shrewsbury 1885–92, bought the estate in 1875 and moved into the house in 1879. Raised the Berwick Jersey cattle herd on the estate, one of the earliest such herds in England.

== Current use ==
The house today is used as a wedding venue.
