= Jim Watson =

Jim or Jimmy Watson may refer to:

== Politics ==
- Jim Watson (Canadian politician) (born 1961), mayor of Ottawa, Canada
- Jim Watson (English politician) (?–2013), former mayor of Blackburn, U.K.
- Jim Watson (Illinois politician) (born 1965), state representative from Illinois, U.S.

== Sports ==
- Jimmy Watson (Irish footballer) (19th century), fullback for Ulster and Ireland
- Jimmy Watson (footballer, born 1877) (1877–1942), Scottish fullback who played for Sunderland, Middlesbrough, and Scotland
- Jimmy Watson (footballer, born 1914) (1914–1979), English footballer who played inside-forward for Gillingham
- Jimmy Watson (footballer, born 1924) (1924–1996), Scottish footballer who played striker for Motherwell and Huddersfield Town
- Jim Watson (Australian footballer) (1896–1978), Australian rules footballer for Carlton and Fitzroy
- Jim Watson (American football) (1921–2004), American football player
- Jim Watson (ice hockey) (born 1943), Canadian ice hockey player who played for the NHL's Detroit Red Wings and Buffalo Sabres
- Jimmy Watson (ice hockey) (born 1952), Canadian ice hockey player who played for the NHL's Philadelphia Flyers
- Jim Watson (sportscaster), American host and announcer for Fox Sports and NBC Sports

== Other ==
- Jim Watson (actor) (born 1989), Canadian television actor
- Jim Watson (biologist) (1943–2017), New Zealand bio-technologist and entrepreneur
- Jim Watson (guitarist), early member of the band 311
- Jimmy Watson Memorial Trophy, awarded annually at the Royal Melbourne Wine Show
- Jim Watson (artist) (1932–2017), British comics artist

== See also ==
- James Watson (disambiguation)
- Jamie Watson (disambiguation)
