= Berwyn, Denbighshire =

Settlement in Denbighshire, Wales

Coordinates: 52.979°N 3.196°W

Berwyn
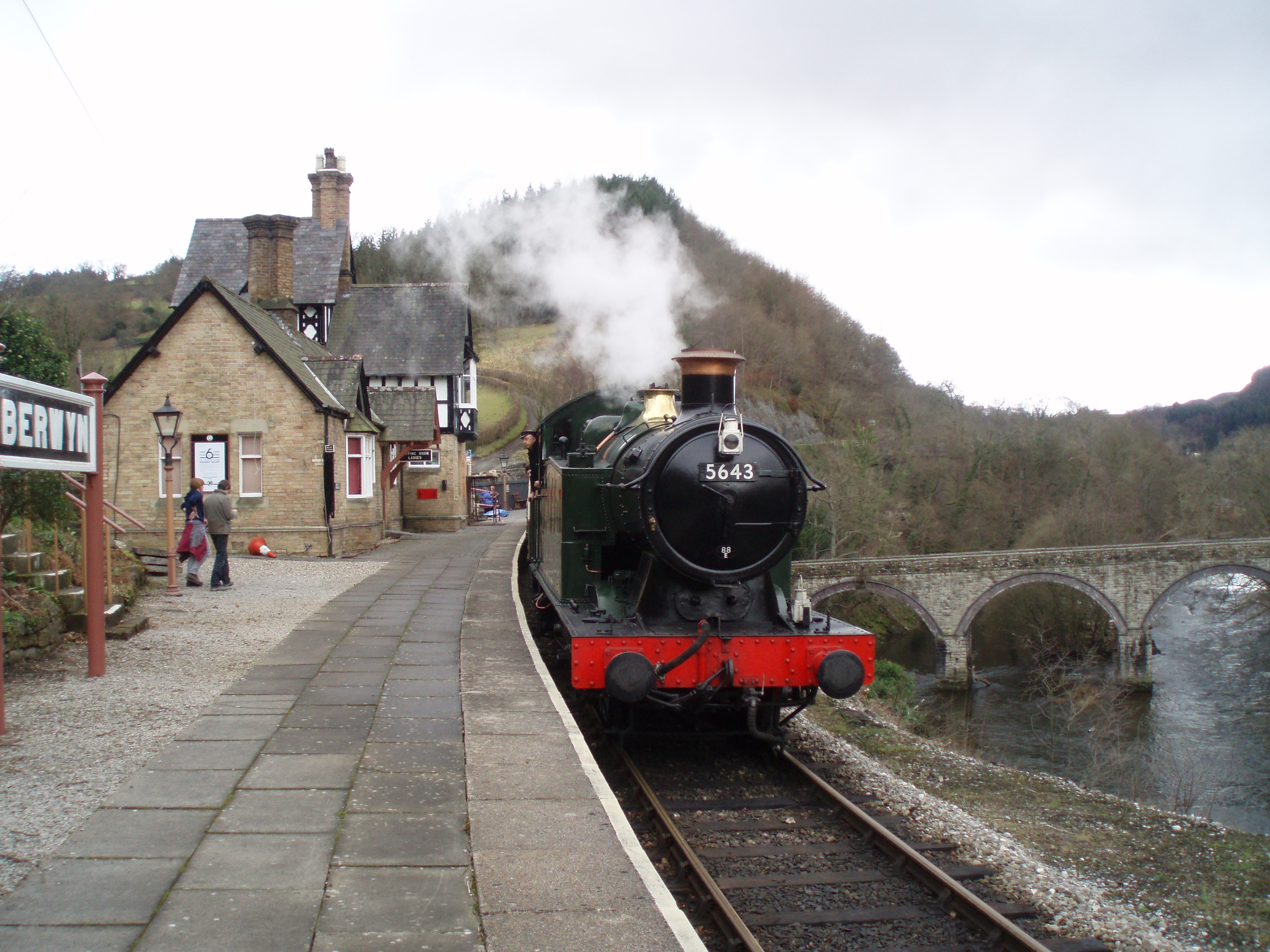
- A steam train at Berwyn station

- Location within Denbighshire
- OS grid reference: SJ197431
- Community: Llangollen
- Principal area: Denbighshire
- Country: Wales
- Sovereign state: United Kingdom
- Post town: LLANGOLLEN
- Postcode district: LL20
- Dialling code: 01978
- Police: North Wales
- Fire: North Wales
- Ambulance: Welsh
- UK Parliament: Clwyd East
- Senedd Cymru – Welsh Parliament: Clwyd South

Berwyn is a settlement in Denbighshire, Wales. The settlement is situated a mile north-west of Llangollen and is adjacent to the River Dee. The Horseshoe Falls is nearby. Berwyn has a station on the Llangollen Railway.

Despite the name, it is not particularly close to the hill Cadair Berwyn, the highest point in the county, or the Berwyn range of hills, being in the Dee valley.

== See also ==
- Chain Bridge, Berwyn
