= Jamie Watson =

Jamie Watson may refer to:

- Jamie Watson (basketball) (born 1972), American basketball player
- Jamie Watson (soccer) (born 1986), American soccer player
- Jamie Watson, record producer of Enter the Vaselines
- Jamie Watson (voice actor), Canadian voice actor

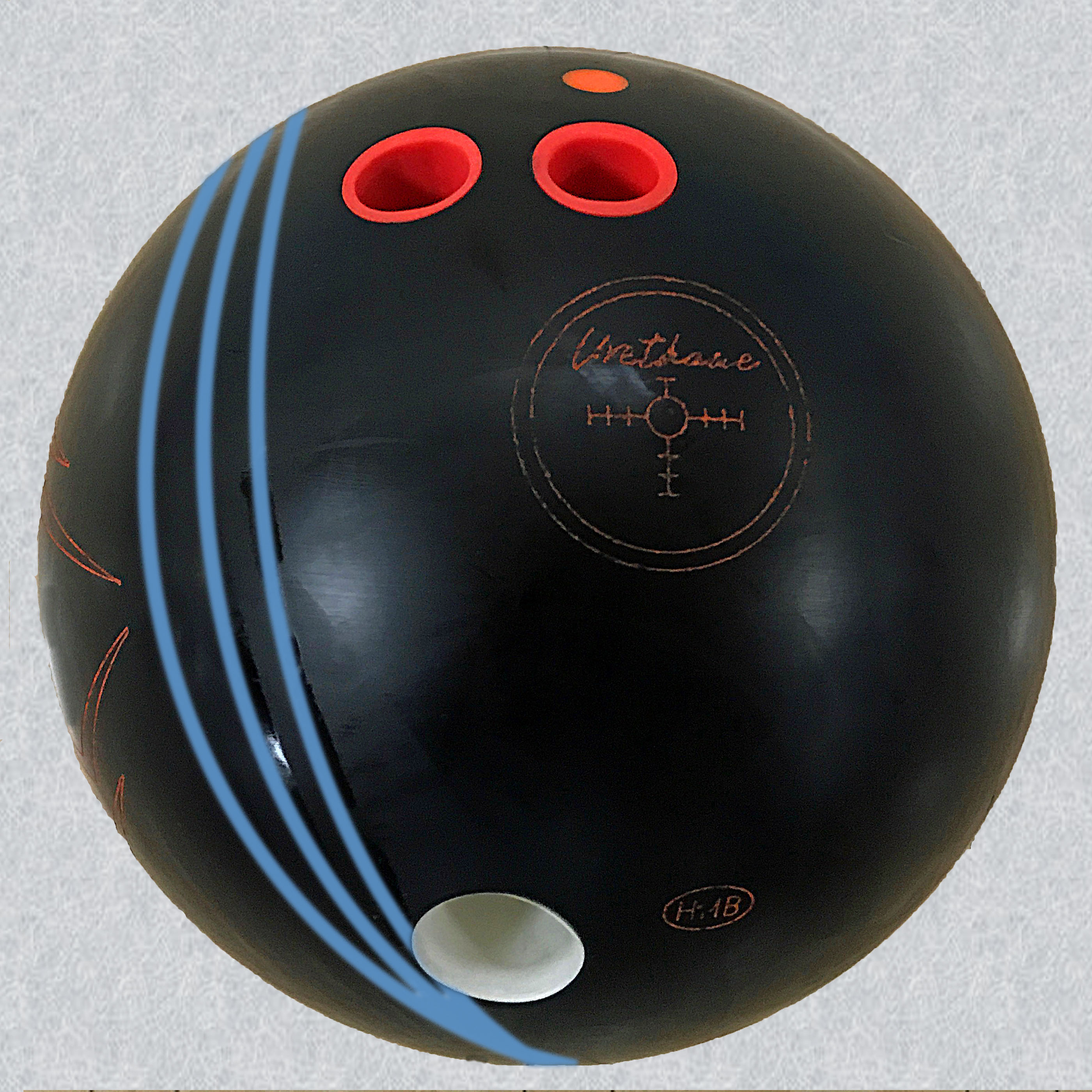

== See also ==
- James Watson (disambiguation)
- Jim Watson (disambiguation)
