= James Watson (Shrewsbury MP) =

James Watson (1817 – 5 July 1895) was an English merchant, dairy herdsman and Conservative politician who sat in the House of Commons from 1885 to 1892.

Watson was born at Birmingham the son of James Watson, of Edgbaston and his wife Mary Spreadborough. Watson was a cheesemonger in Birmingham. In 1875, he purchased Berwick House near Shrewsbury and moved in four years later after extensive reconstruction. There he established one of the first herds of Jersey cows in England. He became a J.P. for the counties of Staffordshire, Shropshire and Worcestershire. He served as treasurer of the Salop Infirmary in Shrewsbury in 1886.

At the 1885 general election Watson was elected as the Member of Parliament (MP) for Shrewsbury and held the seat until he stood down at the 1892 election.

Watson died at the age of 78.

Watson married Jane Willan in 1856 and they had a daughter Florence.

Parliament of the United Kingdom
Preceded by Charles Cecil Cotes; Henry Robertson	Member of Parliament for Shrewsbury; 1885–1892	Succeeded by Henry David Greene
