= Beyer Building =

University building in Manchester, England

Coordinates: 53.46585°N 2.23350°W

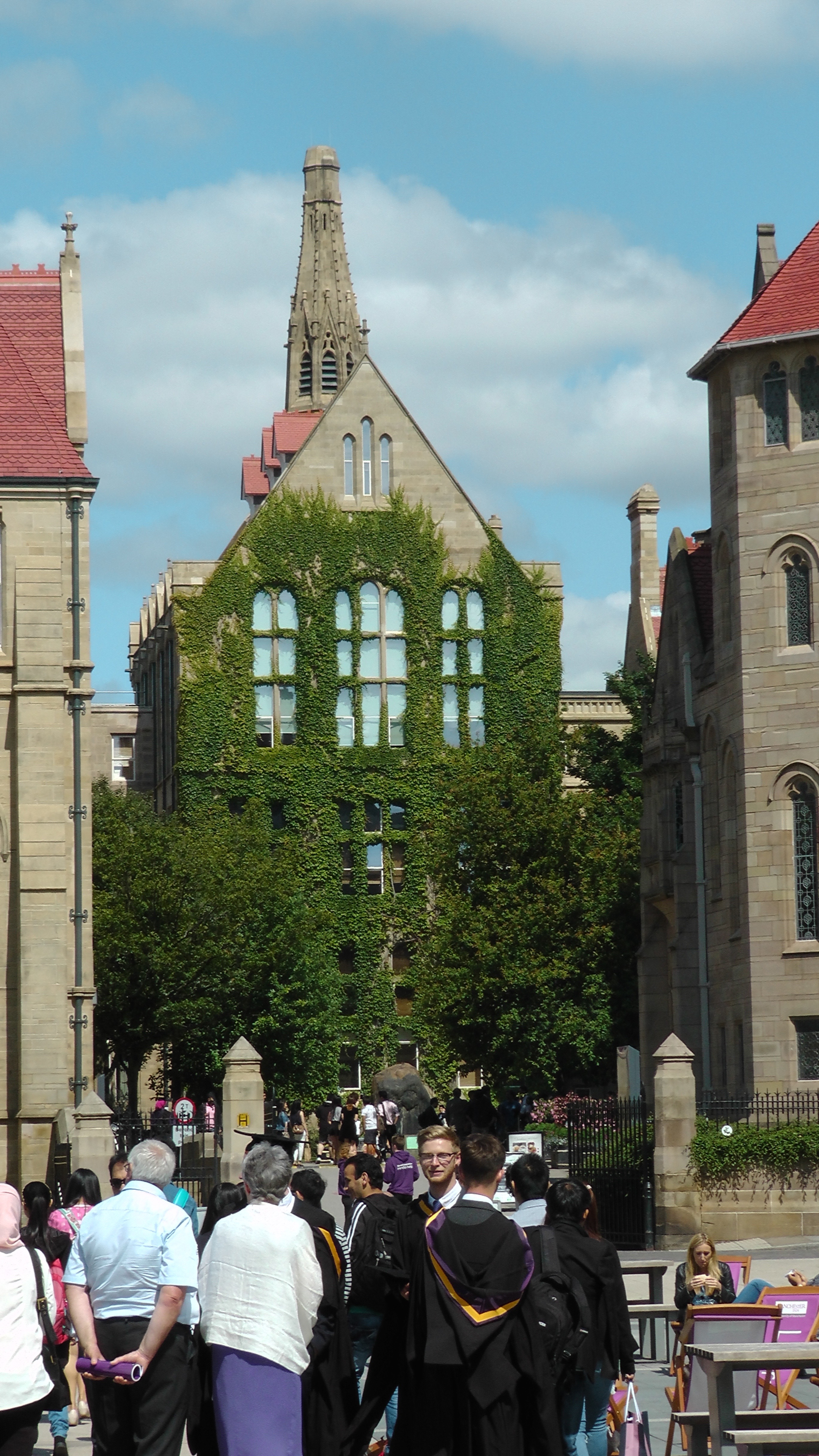
The Beyer Building; July 2015

The Beyer Building is part of the Old Quadrangle, of the University of Manchester, on Oxford Road, Manchester. The quadrangle comprises the oldest buildings of the University and was completed in 1904, prior to the Owens College becoming the Victoria University of Manchester. The original college building on Oxford Road (now called the John Owens Building) was built in 1873. The Beyer Building was the second side to be completed in 1887. It was funded entirely by Charles Beyer through his will of 1876. Beyer was a well known philanthropist and co-founder of Beyer, Peacock & Company, one of the world's most famous locomotive manufacturers. He was a life governor of Owens College, actively involved in the Owens College Extension Movement, and the single biggest donor to the Extension fund, which in total raised over £100,000 (£10 million today) to construct the original building at Oxford Road.

The architect was Alfred Waterhouse. The building was designed to accommodate the natural science (Biology, Geology) departments, which it continued to do until the 1970s. It also featured state of the art laboratories and lecture theatres.

It connects to the Manchester Museum (the third side of the Quadrangle), which was also built in 1887, and also by Waterhouse. This allowed students to access the many specimens from the museum.

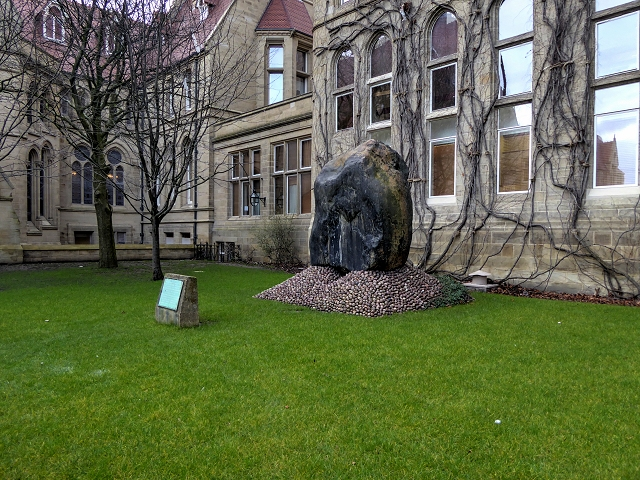
The andesite boulder found at Ducie Street which was placed in front of the Beyer Building

Near the front of the building is a glacial erratic andesite boulder found nearby in the 1880s.
