= Henry Robertson =

Scottish mining engineer, railway builder, industrialist and Liberal Party politician

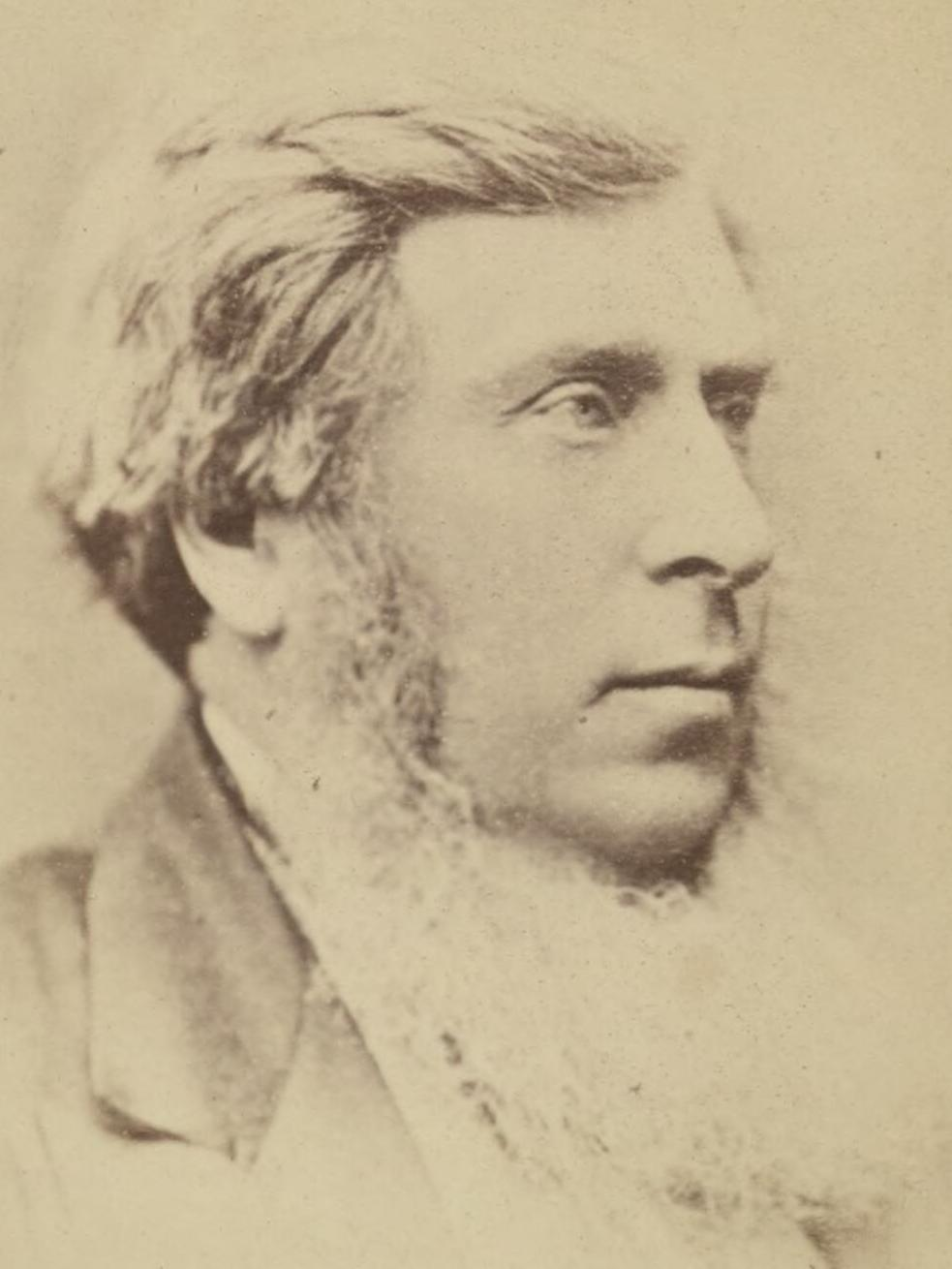
Henry Robertson in c. 1865

Henry Robertson (11 June 1816 – 22 March 1888) was a Scottish mining engineer and prolific railway builder, industrialist and Liberal Party politician. He was head of Brymbo Steelworks, Wrexham. He was the co-founder of Beyer-Peacock, with Charles Beyer, and Richard Peacock. His son Sir Henry Beyer Robertson was knighted by Queen Victoria for the achievements of his father.

== Biography ==
The son of Duncan Robertson, he was born in Banff, Aberdeenshire on 16 January 1816, and educated at King's College, Aberdeen University, and graduated M.A. He was initially to enter the ministry but turned to engineering.

=== Career ===
He started as a railway contractor securing some contracts at Port Glasgow, under Joseph Locke.

On the offer of a Scottish bank to invest in the North Wales mineral district in 1842, Robertson ventured south, and purchased Brymbo Iron Works and colliery, formerly owned by John Wilkinson. Robertson decided that for the venture to succeed he needed to build a railway from Brymbo to Connah's Quay to export the coal and iron. This became the North Wales Mineral Railway, which runs from Wrexham to Chester, with a branch to Brymbo. At Chester he had access to the Birkenhead Joint Railway and its associated docks.

== Robertson's railways ==
Robertson was the chief civil engineer responsible for the building of the following (often with Thomas Brassey as the construction contractor)

- North Wales Mineral Railway
- Shrewsbury and Chester Railway
- Shrewsbury and Hereford Railway
- Bala and Festiniog Railway
- Shrewsbury and Birmingham Railway
- Vale of Llangollen Railway
- Llangollen and Corwen Railway
- Corwen and Bala Railway
- Bala and Dolgellau Railway
- Wirral Railway
- Wrexham, Mold and Connah's Quay Railway (extension to Wirral Railway)
- Central Wales Railway (from Craven Arms to Llandovery)

== Notable bridges ==
Robertson's bridges, all in north Wales, included:

- Cefn Viaduct – carrying Shrewsbury and Chester over the River Dee near Cefn Mawr, Ruabon.
- Chirk Railway Viaduct – carrying Shrewsbury and Chester Railway over the River Ceirriog at Chirk
- Queensferry Railway Swing Bridge over the River Dee, connecting Flintshire and the Wirral.
- The second Chain Bridge – over the Dee, near Llangollen, built in 1876 close to his business partner Charles Beyer's Llantysilio Hall estate

== Brymbo iron and steel works, Wrexham ==
Robertson purchased the old iron works of John Wilkinson in 1840. In 1885 he introduced steel-making. Following his death in 1889, his son Sir Henry Beyer Robertson took over and would later (1930s) rescue the plant from bankruptcy following the great depression, and install new blast furnaces.

== Coal and mineral companies ==
Robertson's mining and related interests included:

- Brymbo Iron and Coal Company (Gatewen and Plaspower collieries), Wrexham
- Broughton and Plaspower Coal Company
- Ruabon Coal and Coal and Coke Company. Formed in 1865 with Henry Dennis and Sir Daniel Gooch (who was then chairman of the Great Western Railway). This enabled the company to have preferential rates to transport the coal.
- Minera Lime Company (to supply the ironworks)
- Brymbo Waterworks

== Charles Beyer ==
Robertson was co-founder in 1854 of Beyer, Peacock and Co with Charles Beyer and Richard Peacock. Based at Gorton Foundry, in Gorton, Manchester, it would become one of the world's leading locomotive manufacturers. Robertson knew Beyer because he supplied some of the locomotives to his railways. He was a sleeping partner but his connections with the Great Western Railway proved useful in securing orders.

On the recommendation of Thomas Brassey, Robertson provided the loan, when the original loan of banker Charles Geach fell through. Robertson and Beyer subsequently became close friends for life; Beyer was godfather of Robertson's daughter in 1854 and of his son Sir Henry Beyer Robertson ten years later.

== Political career ==
He served as Liberal MP for Shrewsbury from 1862 to 1865 and from 1874 to 1885, and Merioneth from 1885 to 1886, resigning his seat as a result of his opposition to Gladstone's Home Rule Bill.

== Personal life ==
He was a keen walker and enjoyed dancing.

He married Elizabeth Dean in St James Westminster, London in 1848. She was the daughter of a London solicitor .

They had four children. Elizabeth (1851), Annie (1854), Henrietta (1858), and Henry Beyer Robertson (1864).

== Residences ==
1851: Richmond Place, Chester.

1861: St Mary's Court, Shrewsbury. In the 1860s, he also bought a large estate in Crogen, Llandderfel, near Bala, Gwynedd.

1871, 1881: 13, Lancaster Gate, Paddington, London. In 1871, he built Palé Hall, a large country house, in Llandderfel, which became his country seat.

He died at Palé Hall on 22 March 1888, aged 71.

Parliament of the United Kingdom
Preceded by George Tomline; Robert Aglionby Slaney	Member of Parliament for Shrewsbury; 1862–1865; With: George Tomline	Succeeded by George Tomline; William James Clement
Preceded by James Figgins; Douglas Straight	Member of Parliament for Shrewsbury; 1874–1885; With: Charles Cecil Cotes	Succeeded by James Watson
Preceded by Samuel Holland	Member of Parliament for Merioneth; 1885–1886	Succeeded by Thomas Edward Ellis
