= Henry Beyer Robertson =

English industrialist (1862–1948)

Sir Henry Beyer Robertson (4 May 1862 – 2 June 1948) was an English industrialist.

== Biography ==
Robertson was born on 4 May 1862, in Shrewsbury, to Henry Robertson (1816–1888) and Elizabeth Dean (9 December 1821 – 14 March 1892, formerly of Brymbo Hall). He was named after his godfather, Charles Beyer.

Robertson was educated at Shrewsbury School, Eton College, and Jesus College, Cambridge. He served in the Royal Welsh Fusiliers from 1882 to 1883. He became a director of Beyer, Peacock & Company, and of the Great Western Railway (GWR). His father had been the engineer of many of the railways in Wales which were taken over by the GWR. His father died in 1888, ahead of Queen Victoria's visit to Palé Hall in 1889, and it fell to Henry Beyer Robertson to play host. He was knighted in 1890, as recognition of his father. He was also appointed Deputy Lieutenant, and nominated as High Sheriff of Merionethshire.

Robertson also became was the head of Brymbo Steelworks. His father had rescued the original Brymbo Ironworks (founded by John Wilkinson) in the 1840s, and introduced steel-making in the 1880s. During the First World War ensured maximum production of iron and steel at Brymbo for munitions. He rescued the works from bankruptcy in the 1931 following the Great Depression. He successfully negotiated a contract to supply steel to Rolls-Royce, for aero engine production, during Britain's rearming in response to Germany's growing military build up in the late 1930s. He died on 2 June 1948, aged 76.

== Family life ==
Robertson married in 1890 Florence Mary Keates, daughter of Joseph Andrew Keates and granddaughter of William Keates (1801–1888), of the Lancashire copper smelters Newton, Keates & Co. The couple had six children: four daughters, Jean (born 1892), Mary (born 1893), Elizabeth (born 1894), Annie (born 1895); followed by two boys, Henry (born 1897), and Duncan (born 1900).
