= Bryntysilio Hall =

Country house in Denbighshire, Wales

Coordinates: 52.982°N 3.1975°W

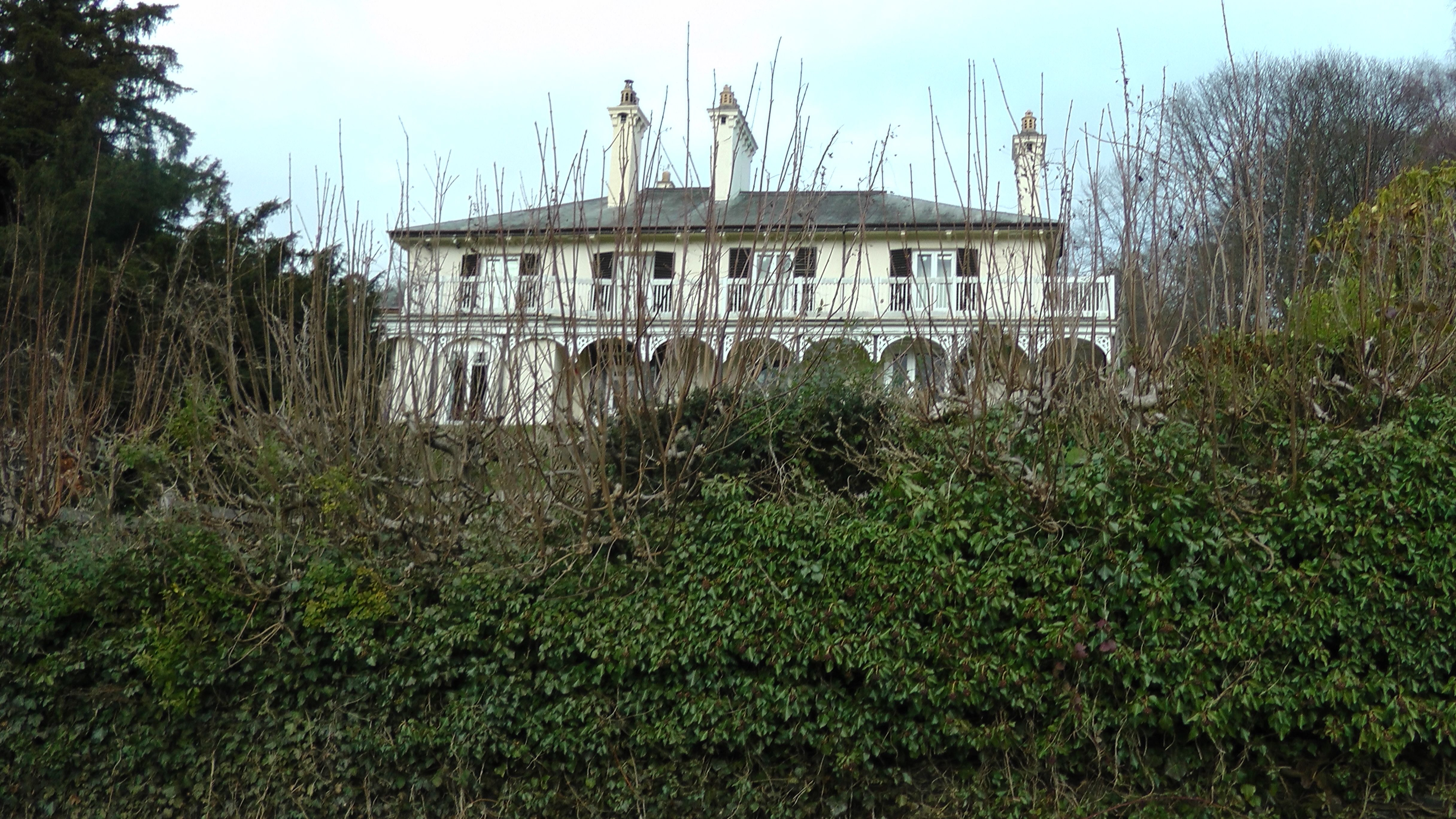
Bryntysilio Hall July 2015

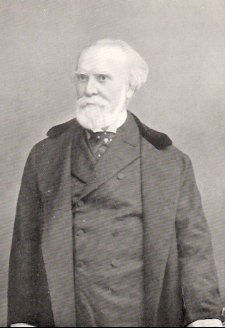
Sir Theodore Martin

Bryntysilio Hall is a country house in Llantysilio, Denbighshire, north Wales, two miles west of Llangollen. It was the summer residence of Sir Theodore Martin, the author of Life of The Prince Consort, the official biography of Prince Albert, and of Martin's wife, Shakespearean actress Lady Martin (Helena Faucit). Sir Theodore wrote most of the book whilst at Bryntysilio, which was their summer residence. He was knighted for his work and became a close friend of Queen Victoria. It was written 1874-1880. On 26 August 1889 (the late Prince Albert's birthday), during Victoria's visit to North Wales, she visited Bryntysilio Hall and took tea there. Sir Theodore showed the queen the writing desk where most of the work was written.

Lady Martin died at Bryntysilio Hall on 31 October 1898. She is buried in Brompton Cemetery, London. A memorial tablet is in Llantysilio Church.

Sir Theodore died at Byntysilio Hall on 18 August 1909, and his coffin was taken by train to London for burial. The Llangollen Advertiser of 27 August 1909 reported "For two miles along the banks of the Dee the road was lined with sympathisers, and blinds were drawn at all residences along the route"

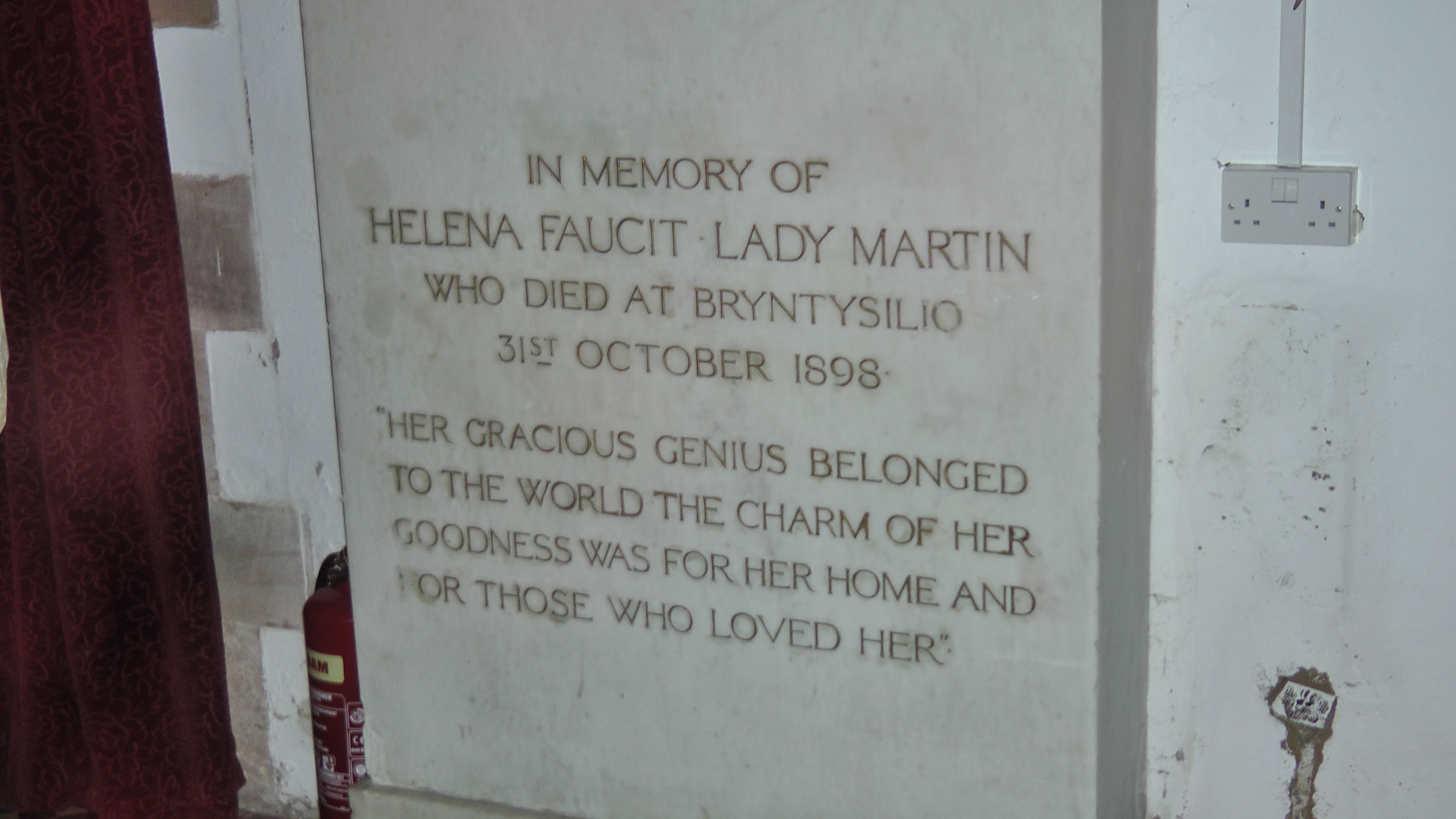
Lady Theodore Martin's memorial inside Llantysilio church

Originally a small cottage called Braich y Gwynt, it was purchased in 1865 and was greatly enlarged, the work being completed in 1870. Occupied by the military in World War II the house was afterwards restored, but much reduced in size by Sydney Aston before being later sold to Walsall Schools Holiday Camp Trust as an outdoor education centre.

Bryntysilio Outdoor Education Centre currently provides quality outdoor & adventure education for schools across the UK.
