= Walter Mason Camp =

American author

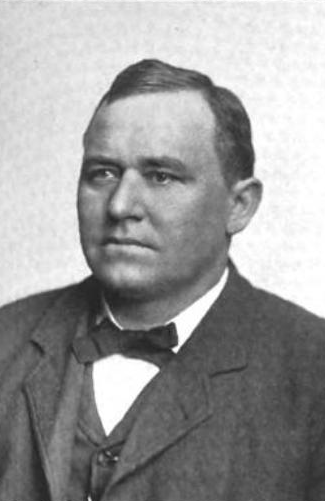
- Born: April 21, 1867; Camptown, Pennsylvania
- Died: August 3, 1925 (aged 58); Kankakee, Illinois
- Occupations: Writer, editor
- Spouse: Emeline L. F. Sayles (m. 1898)

Walter Mason Camp (1867–1925) was an American editor, author, railroad expert and historical researcher.

== Biography ==
Walter Mason Camp was born in Camptown, Pennsylvania, on April 21, 1867. He attended public school in Wyalusing, Pennsylvania before attending the Pennsylvania State College until 1891 and then the University of Wisconsin from 1895 to 1896. He was a student of civil engineering and his post-graduate studies focused on electricity and steam. From 1897 until his death, he was the editor of The Railway and Engineering Review (later renamed Railway Review), a railroad construction and engineering journal published in Chicago. He was a member of many different organizations relating to engineering and history. Camp married Emeline L. F. Sayles in 1898. They had no children. He died unexpectedly at Kankakee, Illinois, on August 3, 1925, after living in Chicago for many years.

Camp also spent time interviewing and documenting the experiences of Native Americans and United States soldiers in the American Indian Wars. Intending to draft a book on the topic, he collected source material in the form of interview notes, personal correspondence, field notes and maps. The Battle of Little Bighorn seemed to have been emphasized in his research. Camp's materials are now held in public collections, including at the Brigham Young University Library in Provo, Utah, the University of Colorado at Boulder Library, Little Bighorn Battlefield National Monument at Crow Agency, Montana, at the Indiana University Bloomington Library, and the Denver Public Library in Denver, Colorado.

About his passion for oral history and his intentions for his research, Camp said:

After having listened to the story of the Little Bighorn Expedition from the lips of some of the men who participated therein, the current literature [in 1909] on the subject seemed to present such a tangle of fiction, fancy, fact and feeling that I formed an ambition to establish the truth. It occurred to me that the essential facts must rest in the minds of many men then living, and that these facts, if collected, would constitute fairly accurate history. This has been my plan—to gather my data from eyewitnesses.

== Written works ==
In addition to his work as the editor of the Railway Review, Camp was the author of published works such as the authoritative 1903 two-volume text Notes on Track (also known as Roadbed and Track), which was a standard reference on the subject of railroad work in the college classroom for many years. He was a joint author of Railroad Transportation at the Universal Exposition, St. Louis in 1904. His professional work also included a Life of Samuel F. Patterson and papers written for technical associations.

Camp also authored an address to the Order of Indian Wars wherein he described his research findings on distinct conflicts between the United States Army and Native American tribes. The address was covered in the newspaper Winners of the West on October 30, 1933. The report claimed that Camp had assembled about fifty pounds of manuscript records throughout his research.

=== Legacy ===
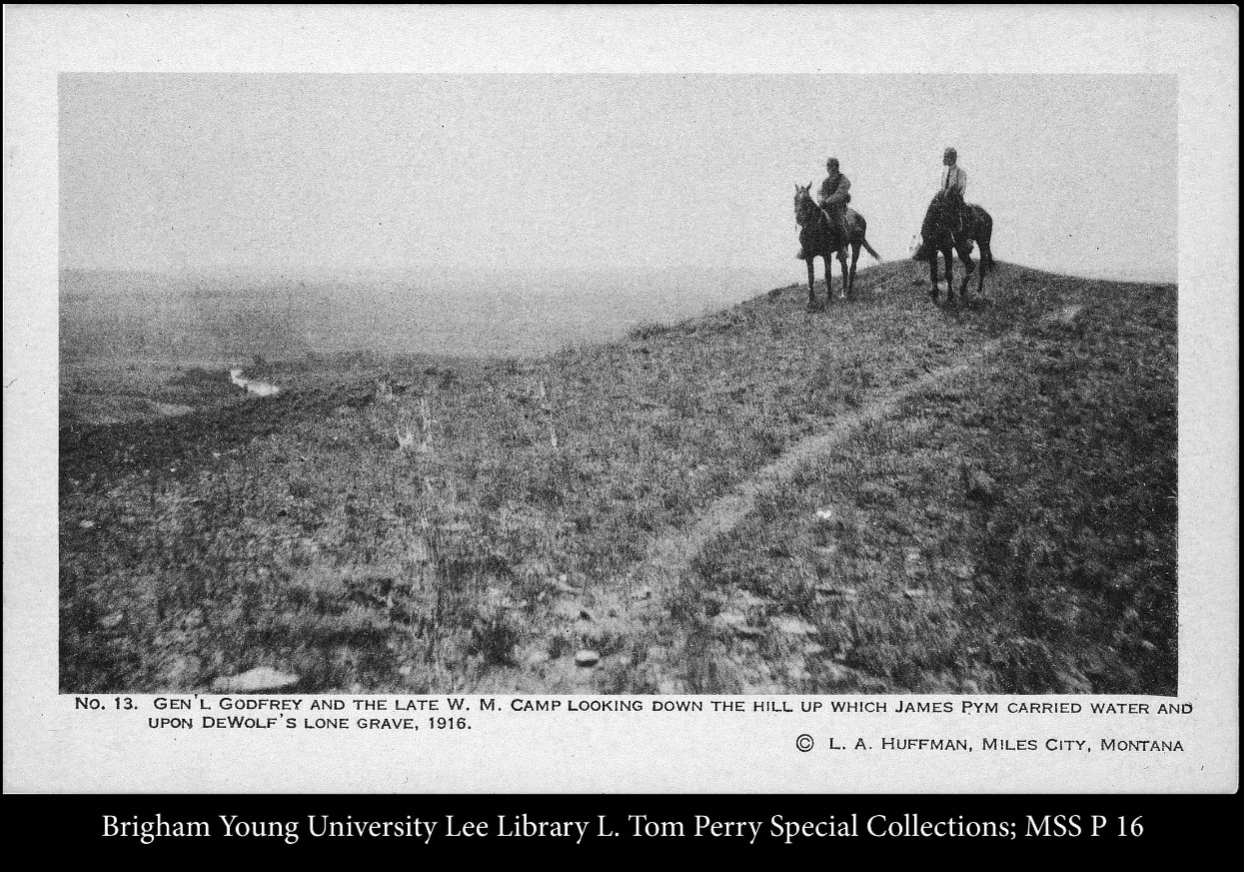
General Godfrey and Walter Camp on DeWolf's Lone Grave

Western historians believe that Camp's work as an oral historian greatly contributed to our knowledge of the American Indian Wars and especially the Battle of Little Bighorn. He became familiar with Native American languages and customs (especially the Sioux), visited over forty battlefields in person, and conducted interviews with almost 200 individuals who participated in the American Indian Wars. In addition to the Battle of Little Bighorn, he sought out information about other battles during the Great Sioux War, including the Battle of Washita River, the Battle on the Red Fork, Baldwin's fight with Sitting Bull on Redwater Creek, the battle of Wolf Mountain, and the Lamedeer fight, as well as the Nez Perce campaign, the Cheyenne outbreak under Dull Knife in Nebraska, Baldwin's fight on the Little Porcupine, the Yellow Hand affair, the capture of Rain-In-The-Face, the death of Sitting Bull, and the Wounded Knee and White Clay affairs.

Camp recorded his interviews by taking handwritten notes on papers he had on hand, including the backs of old envelopes and due bills. Though several parties were interested in Camp's papers after his death, Emeline Camp was reportedly difficult to work with when it came to the collection and several years passed before any scholars were able to use Camp's valuable notes.

Editors such as Kenneth Hammer have since worked with and published Camp's research. Hammer's work with Camp's research included transcribing many of the handwritten notes into typescript.

Camp's research appears in the following works:

- Custer in '76: Walter Camp's Notes on the Custer Fight edited by Kenneth Hammer
- Custer & Company: Walter Camp's Notes on the Custer Fight edited by Bruce R Liddic and Paul Hardbaugh
- Walter M. Camp's Little Bighorn Rosters annotated by Richard G. Hardorff
- Camp, Custer, and the Little Bighorn: A Collection of Walter Mason Camp's Research Papers compiled, edited, and annotated by Richard G. Hardorff
