= Llantysilio =

Community in Denbighshire, Wales

Llantysilio: Welsh: Llandysilio-yn-Iâl
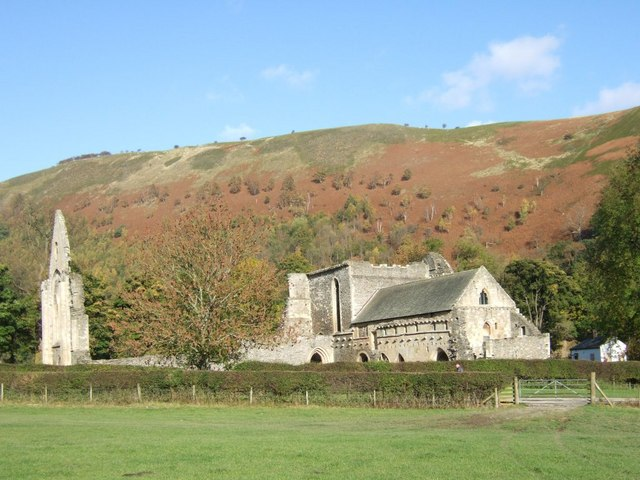
- Valle Crucis Abbey

- Location within Denbighshire
- Population: 421 (2011)
- OS grid reference: SJ1943
- Community: Llantysilio
- Principal area: Denbighshire
- Preserved county: Clwyd
- Country: Wales
- Sovereign state: United Kingdom
- Post town: LLANGOLLEN
- Postcode district: LL20
- Dialling code: 01978
- Police: North Wales
- Fire: North Wales
- Ambulance: Welsh
- UK Parliament: Clwyd East
- Senedd Cymru – Welsh Parliament: Clwyd South
- List of places UK Wales Denbighshire 52.983°N 3.203°W Map of the community

Llantysilio (Welsh: Llandysilio-yn-Iâl) is a community in Denbighshire, Wales, near Llangollen. It had a population of 472 in 2001, falling to 421 at the 2011 census.

The community includes the site of Valle Crucis Abbey, the Horseshoe Pass, and Llantysilio Hall; it also includes the villages of Pentredwr and Rhewl, as well as the areas of Eglwyseg, Llandynan, and Llidiart Annie.

== History ==
A Topographical Dictionary of Wales (1849) described it as follows:

Llantysillio or Llandysillio is a parish, in the union of Corwen, hundred of Yale, county of Denbigh, North Wales, 2 miles (N. W. by W.) from Llangollen, on the road to Ruthin; containing 921 inhabitants. This parish derives its name from the dedication of its church to St. Tysilio, a canonized Prince of Powys, who was descended from St. Pabo, called Post Prydain, "the pillar of Britain", and who was also a writer of the mid-7th century.<...>
