= Llangollen and Corwen Railway =

Railway in Wales

Llangollen and Corwen Railway Act 1860
- Act of Parliament
- Parliament of the United Kingdom
- Long title: An Act for making a Railway from Llangollen in the County of Denbigh to Corwen in the County of Merioneth, and for other Purposes.
- Citation: 23 & 24 Vict. c. clxxxviii

Dates
- Royal assent: 6 August 1860

Text of statute as originally enacted

The Llangollen and Corwen Railway was formed as a continuation of the Vale of Llangollen Railway to continue the line along the Dee Valley a further 9 miles 50 chains (15.5 km) to Corwen. This was opened on throughout on 8 May 1865 and was worked by the Great Western Railway (GWR). It became part of the GWR by the Great Western Railway (Additional Powers) Act 1896 (59 & 60 Vict. c. ccxxxii), and subsequently part of the Western Region of British Railways.

It was closed by British Railways in 1968, but the line survives today, and has operated as a heritage railway since 1981.

== See also ==
- Ruabon to Barmouth Line
