= List of crossings of the River Dee, Wales =

List of existing and some former crossings of the River Dee downstream of Llyn Tegid (Bala Lake). Upstream of the lake where the River Dee is little more than a stream, there are at least 9 crossings mainly for farm access and forestry. Note that dates for medieval bridges are somewhat subjective given the frequent repairs, rebuilds and widenings.

Key to heritage status
Status	Criteria
I	Grade I listed. Bridge of exceptional interest, sometimes considered to be internationally important
II*	Grade II* listed. Particularly important bridge of more than special interest
II	Grade II listed. Bridge of national importance and special interest

Crossing	Date	Coordinates	Heritage status	Locality	Notes	Image
Pont Mwnwgl-y-llyn	Late 18th Century	52.9024°N 3.5928°W	II	Llyn Tegid	Means "Neck of the Lake"; first bridge before rerouting of river, now marooned	
Dee Bridge, Bala		52.9030°N 3.5929°W	-	Bala		
Rail Bridge, Bala	1882	52.9070°N 3.5849°W	-	Bala and Festiniog Railway	Dismantled	
Regulation Sluices, Bala		52.9071°N 3.5835°W	-	Bala		
Pont Fawr	Late 17th Century	52.9171°N 3.5155°W	II*	Llandderfel		
Old Rail Bridge Dol-y-Gadfa	1868	52.9212°N 3.4887°W	-	Ruabon–Barmouth line	Used for farm access	
Pont Cilan	18th Century	52.9257°N 3.4575°W	II	Llandrillo		
Pont Dyfrdwy	1612	52.9602°N 3.4112°W	II*	Cynwyd		
Gwerclas Footbridge		52.9703°N 3.4079°W	-	Corwen	Demolished	
Pont Corwen	1704	52.9795°N 3.3875°W	II*	Corwen		
Corwen Green Lane		52.9849°N 3.3695°W	-	Corwen		
Corwen Victoria Bridge		52.9844°N 3.3686°W	-	Corwen	Demolished	
Corwen Rail Bridge		52.9837°N 3.3675°W	-	Denbigh, Ruthin and Corwen Railway	Dismantled	
Pont Carrog	1661	52.9834°N 3.3192°W	II*	Carrog		
Glyndyfrdwy Bridge		52.9780°N 3.2661°W	-	Glyndyfrdwy		
Berwyn Kings Bridge	1903	52.9799°N 3.1964°W	II	Berwyn		
Berwyn Chain Bridge	1818 (first bridge, since rebuilt)	52.9804°N 3.1948°W	-	Berwyn	Pedestrian	
Llangollen Rail Bridge	1865	52.9821°N 3.1817°W	-	Llangollen Railway		The_Llangollen_Railway_crosses_Afon_Dyfrdwy_at_Pentre_Felin_-_geograph.org.uk_-_46308
Llangollen Bridge	1540s	52.9711°N 3.1702°W	I	Llangollen		
Pont Cysylltau	1697	52.9707°N 3.0913°W	I	Trevor		
Pontcysyllte Aqueduct	1805	52.9703°N 3.0878°W	I	Trevor		
Cefn (Newbridge) Viaduct	1848	52.9631°N 3.0654°W	II*	Cefn Mawr		
Newbridge Cefn		52.9686°N 3.0622°W	-	Cefn Mawr	B5605	Closed road, Newbridge (geograph 7108957)
A483 Viaduct	1990	52.9615°N 3.0448°W	-	Ruabon	57m above river	
Pen-y-Lan Bridge		52.9582°N 3.0004°W	-		Private Estate Bridge	
Overton Bridge	1814	52.9778°N 2.9629°W	II	Overton-on-Dee		
Bangor Bypass Bridge		53.0010°N 2.9113°W	-	Bangor-on-Dee	A525	
Bangor Bridge	17th Century	53.0027°N 2.9137°W	I	Bangor-on-Dee		
Bangor Rail Bridge		53.0105°N 2.9007°W	-	Wrexham and Ellesmere Railway	Dismantled 1962, abutments remain	
Pickhill Bridge		53.0172°N 2.8847°W	-		Private Estate Bridge	
Holt Bypass Bridge		53.0746°N 2.8818°W	-	Holt	A534	
Farndon-Holt Bridge	1345	53.0837°N 2.8797°W	I	Farndon		
Aldford Iron Bridge	1824	53.1348°N 2.8709°W	I	Aldford		
Chester Bypass Bridge	1976	53.1633°N 2.8771°W	-	Chester	A55 Expressway	
Queens Park Suspension Bridge	1923	53.1880°N 2.8843°W	-	Chester	Pedestrian	
Chester Old Dee Bridge	1387	53.1855°N 2.8886°W	I	Chester		
Grosvenor Bridge	1833	53.1836°N 2.8961°W	I	Chester		
Chester Rail Bridge		53.1866°N 2.9046°W	-	Chester		
Saltney Footbridge	1968	53.1857°N 2.9452°W	-	Saltney	Pedestrian	
Queensferry Bypass Bridge		53.2101°N 3.0140°W	-	Queensferry	A494	
Jubilee Bridge	1926	53.2106°N 3.0166°W	II	Queensferry		
Hawarden Bridge	1889	53.2166°N 3.0339°W	II	Shotton	Borderlands line. Originally Hydraulic Swing	
Flintshire Bridge	1998	53.2294°N 3.0668°W	-	Connah's Quay	A548	
