= Dee Regulation Scheme =

Water management scheme in UK

The Dee regulation scheme is a system of flow balancing and quality management along the River Dee managed by a consortium of the three largest water companies licensed to take water from the river, United Utilities, Welsh Water and Severn Trent Water; together with the regulator, Natural Resources Wales.

== Water demand ==
The water demands of North West England including Liverpool and the Wirral far exceed the locally available sources of clean water. The River Dee runs mainly in North Wales before flowing through Chester, England, and then returning to Wales in a man-made channel constructed to gain land from the Dee Estuary. The Dee is the largest relatively clean river left near to the North West conurbation and without water from the Dee much of Liverpool would be without water, unless local rivers such as the Mersey were rehabilitated. However, the natural flow of the River Dee during most summers is insufficient to sustain any significant abstractions. To overcome this problem, a series of reservoirs have been constructed to store the excess water available in the winter time and release it back into the River Dee during the drier months.

This is the principle of low-flow regulation. This was used by Thomas Telford at the beginning of the nineteenth century in order to guarantee a supply of water to the Ellesmere Canal. Telford constructed sluices at the outlet of Llyn Tegid (Bala Lake) to control the flow downstream so that there was always sufficient water to supply the canal where it started at Horseshoe Falls.

The River Dee has also been used for direct drinking water supply with the Alwen Reservoir (53.063°N 3.560°W), built in the 1920s to supply Birkenhead with water.

In the industrial revolution many rivers in industrial areas became too polluted by effluents to be usable for water supply. The Dee however remained clean with relatively few polluting effluents in the Dee catchment upstream of Chester. Consequently, the City of Chester has been able to directly abstract Dee water since the first Chester Waterworks Company was formed in 1826.

A project to review the pressures and opportunities for the Dee abstractions was undertaken and published in 1996. One of the outcomes of this report was the development and implementation of the River Dee Water Protection Zone.

== Flow model ==
In order to better manage flow and the substantial abstractions of water from the river, a mathematical model was developed by the University of Lancaster and the Dee Steering Committee to accurately predict when any release of pollutant would reach any of the main abstraction points on the river. The principle model flow data was provided from long-term data sets from Manley Hall gauging station which lies just upstream of the long, almost flat, serpentine section of the river path. The transit time through this stretch of the river can take several days in low-flow conditions. Additional data was obtained from gauges below the major reservoirs and from the sluices at Llyn Tegid. With the benefit of frequent data updates and with the addition of data from real incidents together with real-time data from Manley Hall, it has become possible to predict arrival times of pollutants at any one point downstream of Manley Hall within a window of a few minutes at low flows.

== Bala ==
In the late 1950s the Bala Lake Scheme was promoted to increase the available water for abstraction in the River Dee. Telford's original sluices were by-passed and the natural lake outlet was lowered. New sluice gates were constructed downstream of the confluence with Afon Tryweryn (52.9071°N 3.5835°W), which is only a short distance from the lake exit. This provided 18 million cubic metres of stored water in Bala Lake that could be controlled and used on a seasonal basis for low-flow regulation. This enables continuous abstraction from the River Dee of 235,000 cubic metres per day by six statutory water undertakings and British Waterways Board. An additional benefit was a reduction in flooding events downstream of Bala as Bala Lake (52.892°N 3.618°W) was able to contain the worst of the winter flood peaks.

== Llyn Celyn ==
As demand for water increased it was necessary to increase the storage on the River Dee and the next development was Llyn Celyn (52.95°N 3.693°W), a new 81,000,000-cubic-metre capacity regulating reservoir within the Llyn Tegid (Bala Lake) catchment area. This was completed in 1965 by Liverpool Corporation, and designed to operate in conjunction with the Bala Lake Scheme. This enables additional Dee abstractions of 327,000 cubic metres per day (3.78 m^{3}/s) together with additional flood control storage. In summer time the impact was to increase threefold the dry-weather flow for most of the length of the river. This development was hugely controversial at the time and remains politically fraught to this day, since the construction of the reservoir involved flooding the Tryweryn Valley and the village of Capel Celyn and twelve farms. Local people saw this a destruction of part of the Welsh culture in order to supply England with water. This caused a great deal of controversy, resentment and protest. To try to offset some of the environmental concerns associated with the scheme, some of the stored water was specifically set aside to make special releases to help fisheries, to provide recreational opportunities (canoeing and white-water rafting on Afon Tryweryn) and to disperse pollution events should they occur.

A four megawatt hydro-electric station at the dam was also included in the scheme in 1965.

== Llyn Brenig ==
Further statutory powers were gained in 1973 to construct another major regulating reservoir in the River Brenig valley - Llyn Brenig (53.083°N 3.533°W). This reservoir was first filled in 1979 providing an additional 60 million cubic metres (49,000 acre⋅ft) of storage. This increased the potential for abstraction from the river in the lower reaches to nearly 900,000 cubic metres per day (200×10^{6} imp gal/d).

By 2002 the authorised abstractions had been taken over by three statutory undertakings and British Waterways Board with a total licensed abstraction of 850,000 cubic metres per day (190,000,000 imp gal/d). In addition a residual flow of at least 364,000 cubic metres per day is maintained over Chester Weir in all but the most testing of droughts, safeguarding the passage of migratory fish and limiting the ingress of saline water over Chester Weir during high tides.

== Operating rules ==
The operating rules for the current system are agreed with all the participants and define the circumstances in which flow will be precisely managed. The key measuring location is at Manley Hall (52.966°N 2.971°W), a gauging station near Chirk. This location was chosen as it was on a section of the river where flow could be readily measured and above the very flat stretch that meanders into Cheshire. The current rules state that when flow exceeds 10 cubic metres per second (860,000 m^{3}/d) no intervention is required. In practice some adjustment of Bala sluices may take place to increase storage in Llyn Celyn and conversely some releases may be made from Llyn Celyn for recreational or power generation purposes. When the flow at Manley Hall decreases towards 10 m^{3}/s, additional flow is released from Bala Lake. If that is insufficient, flow from Llyn Celyn is used to maintain 10 cubic metres per second (860,000 m^{3}/d) at Manley Hall. In extreme situations where the flow from Llyn Celyn is insufficient to maintain the flow, releases of water from Llyn Brenig are made. Circumstances can arise where even this is insufficient to maintain flows and in such cases drought provisions are agreed which progressively reduce the maintained flow at Manley Hall. The overall effect of this regulation has a marked impact on the hydrograph of the River Dee. In dry years the hydrograph flat-lines at 10 m^{3}/s whilst dry weather continues such as in 1990

== Quality management ==
The River Dee regulation system also manages a water quality monitoring and alerting system that includes real-time quality monitoring for a wide range of chemical parameters supplemented by daily fixed site monitoring with analysis provided in near real-time by a dedicated laboratory service. The results of the analysis are made available to the four participating organisations on a routine daily basis. For each of the critical water quality parameters alert levels and action levels have been set based on past experience. If an alert level is exceeded an immediate alert (DEEPOL 1) is issued to all participants. As contamination levels increase or the contaminant plug nears an abstraction point the DEEPOL level rises to DEEPOL 2 and finally DEEPOL 3 at which time the affected abstractions are closed until the river quality returns to normal. This quality management system was developed following a severe Phenol pollution of the River Dee in the 1980s which resulted in contaminated water being supplied to large areas of Liverpool and the Wirral. Contamination of raw water is a more significant problem on the River Dee because the River Dee is normally of exceptionally good quality and as a result the abstractions have been constructed directly from the river rather than via bank-side storage reservoirs as is more common when taking water from Rivers of less reliable quality.

== Water Protection Zone ==
The first Water Protection Zone was established on the River Dee in 1999 as a mechanism to further safeguard the quality of the river. Although the statutory order was promoted by the Environment Agency it was supported and endorsed by the representative members of the Dee Regulation Scheme.
