= Pickhill Halt railway station =

Former railway station in Wrexham, Wales

Pickhill Halt

General information
- Location: Sesswick, Wrexham County Borough; England
- Coordinates: 53.0155°N 2.9196°W
- Grid reference: SJ384468
- Platforms: 1

Other information
- Status: Disused

History
- Original company: Great Western Railway
- Post-grouping: Great Western Railway

Key dates
- 30 May 1938: Opened
- 10 June 1940: Closed
- 6 May 1946: opened
- 10 Sept. 1962: closed
Location

Pickhill Halt railway station was a station in Sesswick, Wrexham, Wales. The station was opened on 30 May 1938 and closed in 1962.

The opening of the halt coincided with the building of a milk factory by Cadbury Brothers, who bought the greenfield site at auction from Mrs Randles, the 92-year old owner of the Brynafon Estate, in March 1937. The station was a single platform of wooden construction, and immediately south of the station under the adjacent road bridge was the gated siding into the factory. After the closure of the railway to passengers the line from Wrexham to Pickhill remained in use for the milk trains, while the line south of the siding was lifted. Although in 1971 the milk factory (known as Maelor Creamery) moved away from rail transport, it continued under various owners until it closed in March 2014.

Preceding station	Disused railways	Following station
Sesswick Halt; Line and station closed	Great Western Railway; Wrexham and Ellesmere Railway	Bangor-on-Dee; Line and station closed
