= Bangor Bridge =

Bridge in Wrexham, Wales

Bangor Bridge Pont Bangor (Welsh)
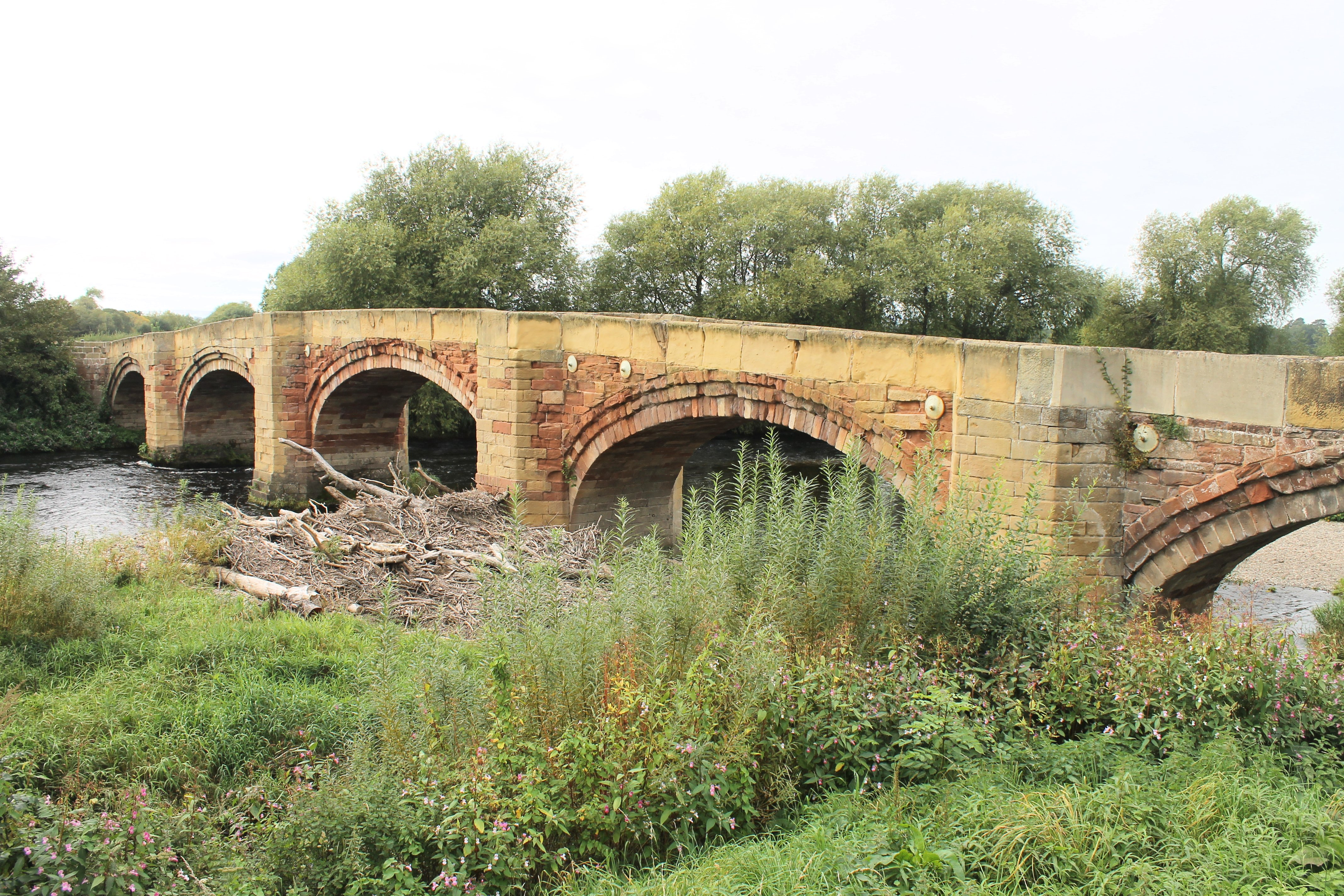
- The bridge from the south.
- Coordinates: 53.0028°N 2.91365°W
- Crosses: River Dee
- Locale: Bangor-on-Dee and Sesswick, Wrexham, Wales
- Other name(s): Bangor-on-Dee Bridge; Bangor-is-y-Coed Bridge; Pont Bangor-is-y-Coed; Bangor Old Bridge
- Heritage status: Grade I

Characteristics
- Design: Arch bridge
- Material: Mainly red sandstone
- Width: 11 feet (3.4 m)
- No. of lanes: one (one-way traffic)

History
- Architect: Inigo Jones (speculated; 1658 rebuilding)
- Construction start: Medieval origins
- Rebuilt: 1658

Statistics

Listed Building – Grade I
- Official name: Bangor Bridge (Partly in Sesswick community) and Bangor Bridge (Partly in Bangor-is-y-Coed Community)
- Designated: 16 November 1962; Amended 24 February 1997 and 20 December 1996
- Reference no.: 1645 and 1635 (dual-listed)

Scheduled monument
- Official name: Bangor Bridge
- Reference no.: 3781

Bangor Bridge (also known as the Bangor-on-Dee Bridge) is a Grade I listed bridge crossing the River Dee in Bangor-on-Dee, Wrexham County Borough, Wales. It is situated on the community boundary between Bangor-is-y-Coed and Sesswick. Located to the west of Bangor-on-Dee, it connects the village's high street and the A525 road bypass. The narrow bridge is a one-way traffic bridge, west to east, and is downstream (north) of the Bangor by-pass bridge.

== Description ==
The bridge crosses the River Dee, with the river currently serving as the boundary between the communities of Bangor-is-y-Coed and Sesswick within Wrexham County Borough since 1996. The River Dee at this location, historically served as the boundary between the historic county of Denbighshire to the west and Flintshire's Maelor Saesneg containing Bangor-on-Dee to the east.

The bridge is listed by Cadw, and described to have a group value with the nearby listed buildings of Bangor-on-Dee war memorial and the Church of St Dunawd.

The cambered bridge's five unequal elliptical stepped arches are mainly made of red sandstone, with some coursed rubble and finely dressed stone. The bridge has four buttresses. The parapets and full height splayed cutwaters are made of yellow sandstone with refuges on the top. The parapets are also made of large dressed slabs and are 11 feet (3.4 m) apart.

Inigo Jones is speculated to be the bridge's architect, with similar bridges constructed in places such as Llanrwst (Pont Fawr) and Llangollen attributed to him.

A scheduled monument is also on the site, consisting of a medieval or post-medieval remains of an older bridge.

== History ==
The earliest reports of a bridge at or near this location in historical maps date to 1036, whereas the earliest mention of a medieval wooden design bridge at this location was recorded in 1292.

The current bridge is of medieval late 15th or early 16th century origins but the current structure mainly dates to the 17th century, with a notable restoration in 1658, by Inigo Jones.

The bridge was repaired several times over its lifespan, including a £23. 16s. repair (equivalent to £3,263 in 2020) in 1757 caused by frequent flooding. There was another repair costing £109. 3s. 10d. (equivalent to £10,959 in 2020) in 1843. Although, described to be "in a state of deterioration", while still used.

It was recorded by the Royal Commission on the Ancient and Historical Monuments of Wales in 1910. The bridge connects to the village's high street.

Prior to the 1900's the bridge was mainly used by horse-drawn vehicles, farm carts and pedestrians. When motor vehicle usage on the bridge increased, it damaged the bridge, leading to the introduction of traffic lights and weight restrictions on the bridge to limit the damage. In 1970, there was a petition to construct a new bridge and by-pass in the village, with the bridge and by-pass completed in 1978 and is located south (upstream) of the medieval bridge. The Bangor-on-Dee bridge was reduced to only one-way traffic from the west, when the A525 by-pass opened. One of the bridge's parapets were destroyed by a tractor in 1996, with repairs later carried out, as well as a wider restoration works since the 1990s.

== See also ==
- List of bridges in Wales
