= Trench Halt railway station =

Disused railway station in Shropshire, England

Trench Halt

General information
- Location: Northwest of Dudleston Heath, Shropshire; England
- Coordinates: 52.9379°N 2.9145°W
- Grid reference: SJ386382
- Platforms: 1

Other information
- Status: Disused

History
- Original company: Cambrian Railways
- Pre-grouping: Cambrian Railways
- Post-grouping: Great Western Railway

Key dates
- 1914: Opened
- 10 June 1940: Closed
- 6 May 1946: reopened
- 10 Sept. 1962: closed
Location

Trench Halt railway station was a station to the northwest of Dudleston Heath, Shropshire, England. The station was opened in 1914 and closed in 1962.

Preceding station	Disused railways	Following station
Overton-on-Dee; Line and station closed	Cambrian Railways; Wrexham and Ellesmere Railway	Elson Halt; Line and station closed
