= Cloy Halt railway station =

Former railway station in Wales

Cloy Halt

General information
- Location: East of Overton-on-Dee, Wrexham County Borough; Wales
- Coordinates: 52.9720°N 2.9014°W
- Grid reference: SJ395420
- Platforms: 1

Other information
- Status: Disused

History
- Post-grouping: Great Western Railway

Key dates
- 30 June 1932: Opened as Cae Dyah Halt
- 10 June 1940: Closed
- 6 May 1946: opened
- 10 Sept. 1962: closed
Location

Cloy Halt railway station was a station to the east of Overton-on-Dee, Wrexham, Wales. The station was opened on 30 June 1932 and closed on 10 September 1962.

Preceding station	Disused railways	Following station
Bangor-on-Dee; Line and station closed	Great Western Railway; Wrexham and Ellesmere Railway	Overton-on-Dee; Line and station closed
