= Overton-on-Dee railway station =

Former railway station in Wales

Overton-on-Dee

General information
- Location: Southeast of Overton-on-Dee, Wrexham County Borough; Wales
- Coordinates: 52.9603°N 2.9120°W
- Grid reference: SJ388407
- Platforms: 2

Other information
- Status: Disused

History
- Original company: Wrexham and Ellesmere Railway
- Pre-grouping: Cambrian Railways
- Post-grouping: Great Western Railway

Key dates
- 2 November 1895: Opened
- 10 June 1940: Closed
- 6 May 1946: reopened
- 10 Sept. 1962: closed
Location

Overton-on-Dee railway station was a station to the southeast of Overton-on-Dee, Wrexham, Wales at Lightwood Green. The station was opened on 2 November 1895 and closed on 10 September 1962.

The station had a goods yard and adjacent livestock market. On the west side a creamery was built around 1919 operated by the Co-Operative Wholesale Society (CWS), and in 1928 with the adoption of milk tank wagons in place of milk churns a siding was extended to the creamery. The creamery closed just before WW2. Also adjacent to the station goods yard was the Overton Brick and Tile Works which closed around WW2 or shortly afterwards.

Preceding station	Disused railways	Following station
Cloy Halt; Line and station closed	Cambrian Railways; Wrexham and Ellesmere Railway	Trench Halt; Line and station closed
