= Hightown, Wrexham =

Suburb of Wrexham, Wales

Coordinates: 53.0398°N 2.985°W

Hightown
- Suburb
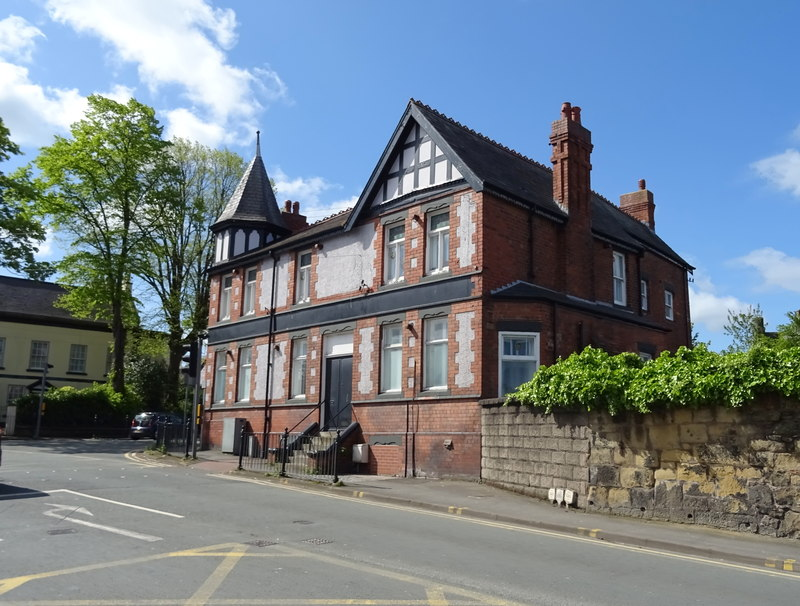
- Former Green Dragon Hotel on the hillside end of Salop Road, Wrexham. The junction was the area historically known as Wrexham Fechan.

- Location within Wrexham
- OS grid reference: SJ 3396449656
- Principal area: Wrexham
- Preserved county: Clwyd
- Country: Wales
- Sovereign state: United Kingdom
- Post town: WREXHAM
- Postcode district: LL13
- Dialling code: 01978
- Police: North Wales
- Fire: North Wales
- Ambulance: Welsh
- UK Parliament: Wrexham
- Senedd Cymru – Welsh Parliament: Wrexham

Hightown is a suburban area of Wrexham, in Wrexham County Borough, Wales.

== History ==
The name Hightown was originally confined to the 19th-century development bounded by Rivulet Road to the north, Bryn y Cabanau to the west, and the Hightown Barracks in the east and south.

The houses along Albert Street, Bury Street, Derby Road and Stanley Street date to the early 1890s. Eventually, terraced houses were built across multiple streets south of Kings Mills Road and next to Bryn y Cabanau Lane (later Road). However, most of these houses were later demolished in the 1960s.

Until 2011, the suburb was home to the "Hightown Flats", five blocks of five-storey flats built in 1970 comprising the Napier Square and Gatefield estates. The complex contained 181 flats and maisonettes, as well as five bungalows and 26 four-bedroom houses. The flats were known for safety issues, such as poorly lit corridors, and vandalism such as graffiti and abandoned furniture. The area around the complex was associated with antisocial behaviour, arson, and theft. The complex was demolished by Wrexham County Borough Council in 2011 for re-generation, with locals supporting demolition as the only option to regenerate the area.

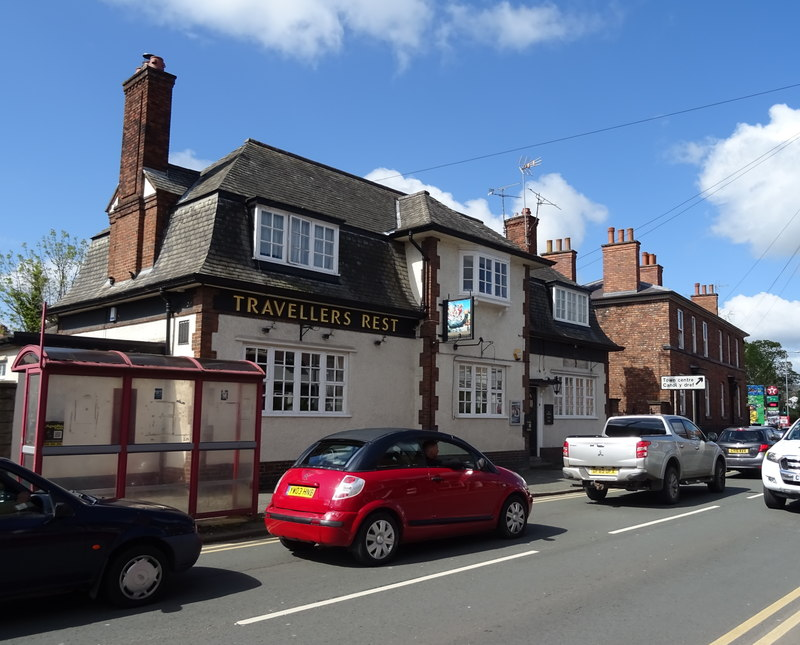
The Travellers Rest, a historic pub in the area.

The north-western parts of Hightown towards St Giles' Church near Salop Road were once a separate hamlet called Wrexham Fechan (Fechan meaning 'little' from Welsh) until it was eventually reabsorbed by the then growing town.

=== Hightown Halt ===
The Wrexham and Ellesmere Railway ran along the northern edge of the area for a short distance, and a station known as Hightown Halt opened in 1923 in the northernmost part of the area. The former station was accessed through steps from Whitegate Road, alongside Connor Crescent. The station closed in 1962 when the line itself was closed to passenger traffic beyond Wrexham Central. The line continued to operate as a goods railway until 1981, when the line was closed and the tracks were lifted. The track bed of the line now forms a public footpath that runs to Kings Mills.

=== Hightown Barracks ===
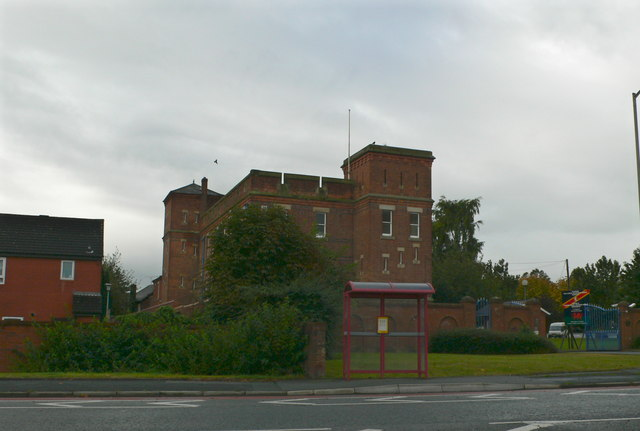

There is a military barracks called Hightown Barracks in the suburb. They date to 1877 and were originally built for the 23rd Royal Welch Fusiliers. In 2023, a statue of a Regimental Goat and Goatmaster was unveiled outside the barracks, surrounded by a memorial garden to commemorate the lives of those who served with the regiment. The Regimental Goat has been a mascot of the Royal Welch Fusiliers since the American War of Independence.
