= Bangor-on-Dee railway station =

Disused railway station in Bangor-on-Dee, Wrexham

Bangor-on-Dee
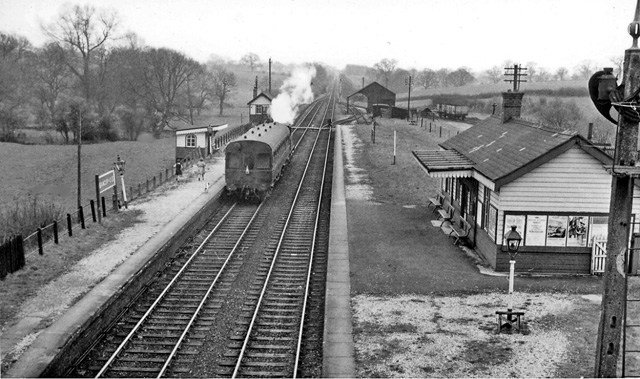
- Bangor-on-Dee station in 1962

General information
- Location: Bangor-on-Dee, Wrexham County Borough; Wales
- Coordinates: 53.0045°N 2.8978°W
- Grid reference: SJ398456
- Platforms: 2

Other information
- Status: Disused

History
- Original company: Wrexham and Ellesmere Railway
- Pre-grouping: Cambrian Railways
- Post-grouping: Great Western Railway

Key dates
- 2 November 1895: Opened
- 10 June 1940: Closed
- 6 May 1946: Opened
- 10 September 1962: Closed
Location

Bangor-on-Dee railway station was a station in Bangor-on-Dee, Wrexham, Wales. The station was opened on 2 November 1895 and closed on 10 September 1962.

Preceding station	Disused railways	Following station
Pickhill Halt; Line and station closed	Cambrian Railways; Wrexham and Ellesmere Railway	Cloy Halt; Line and station closed
