= WPZ =

WPZ is an initialism or acronym and may refer to:

- Taronga Western Plains Zoo in Dubbo, New South Wales, Australia
- Woodland Park Zoo in Seattle, Washington, United States
- Washington Park Zoo, a previous name of the Oregon Zoo in Portland, Oregon, United States
- The Washington Park and Zoo Railway, still the name of the above zoo's railway
- Water Protection Zone
