= Elson Halt railway station =

Disused railway station in Shropshire, England

Elson Halt

General information
- Location: Northwest of Ellesmere, Shropshire; England
- Coordinates: 52.9168°N 2.9190°W
- Grid reference: SJ383358
- Platforms: 1

Other information
- Status: Disused

History
- Original company: Great Western Railway
- Post-grouping: Great Western Railway

Key dates
- 8 February 1937: Opened
- 10 June 1940: Closed
- 6 May 1946: reopened
- 10 Sept. 1962: Closed
Location

Elson Halt railway station was a station to the northwest of Ellesmere, Shropshire, England. The station was opened in 1937 and finally closed in 1962.

Preceding station	Disused railways	Following station
Trench Halt; Line and station closed	Great Western Railway; Wrexham and Ellesmere Railway	Ellesmere; Line and station closed
