= Marchwiel railway station =

Former railway station in Wales

Marchwiel
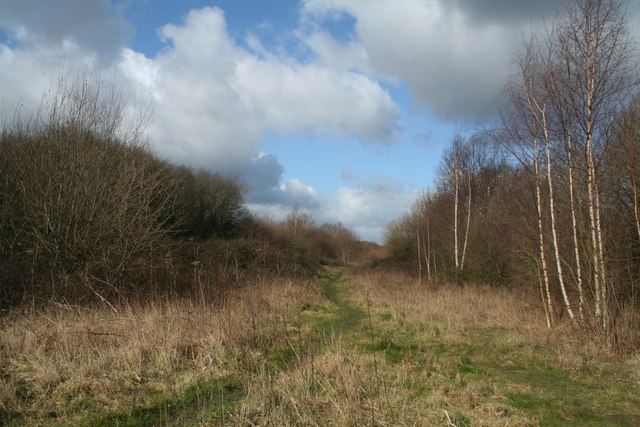
- The site of the station in 2012

General information
- Location: Marchwiel, Wrexham County Borough; Wales
- Coordinates: 53.0249°N 2.9560°W
- Grid reference: SJ359479
- Platforms: 2

Other information
- Status: Disused

History
- Original company: Wrexham and Ellesmere Railway
- Pre-grouping: Cambrian Railways
- Post-grouping: Great Western Railway

Key dates
- 2 November 1895: Opened
- 10 June 1940: Closed
- 6 May 1946: opened
- 10 Sept. 1962: closed
Location

Marchwiel railway station was a station in Marchwiel, Wrexham, Wales. The station was opened on 2 November 1895 and closed on 10 September 1962.

Preceding station	Disused railways	Following station
Hightown Halt; Line and station closed	Cambrian Railways; Wrexham and Ellesmere Railway	Sesswick Halt; Line and station closed
