= Sesswick Halt railway station =

Former railway station in Wales

Sesswick Halt

General information
- Location: Sesswick, Wrexham County Borough; Wales
- Coordinates: 53.0181°N 2.9259°W
- Grid reference: SJ379471
- Platforms: 1

Other information
- Status: Disused

History
- Original company: Cambrian Railways
- Pre-grouping: Cambrian Railways
- Post-grouping: Great Western Railway

Key dates
- 1 October 1913: Opened
- 10 June 1940: Closed
- 6 May 1946: opened
- 10 Sept. 1962: closed
Location

Sesswick Halt railway station was a station in Sesswick, Wrexham, Wales. The station was opened on 1 October 1913 and closed on 10 September 1962.

Preceding station	Disused railways	Following station
Marchwiel; Line and station closed	Cambrian Railways; Wrexham and Ellesmere Railway	Pickhill Halt; Line and station closed
