= Aerfen =

Celtic goddess of fate and warfare

Aerfen is a Celtic goddess of fate and warfare, and the personification of River Dee in Wales.

The name Aerfen is the modern Welsh form of Common Celtic Aerten, which was derived from agro-, "carnage", and tan-nu, "to broaden" or "to spread", or ten-n-do-, "to break" or "to cut". Together, Aerfen probably means "renowned in battle". Aerfen had also been used as an alternate name for the River Dee.

Aerfen had a shrine in Glyndyfrdwy on River Dee. Local legend states that three human sacrifices had to be drowned in the river, to ensure success in battle. During Anglo-Welsh wars, the river Dee, which is situated on the English-Welsh border, was said to be the arbiter of victory and defeat. It was said that if the Dee ate away its eastern bank, it was a sign of English victory, and vice versa. Aerfen could be compared to Morrígan in Irish mythology.

== See also ==
- Hafren – namesake of the River Severn
