= Llyn Tegid =

Lake in Gwynedd, Wales

- Bala Lake or Lake Bala
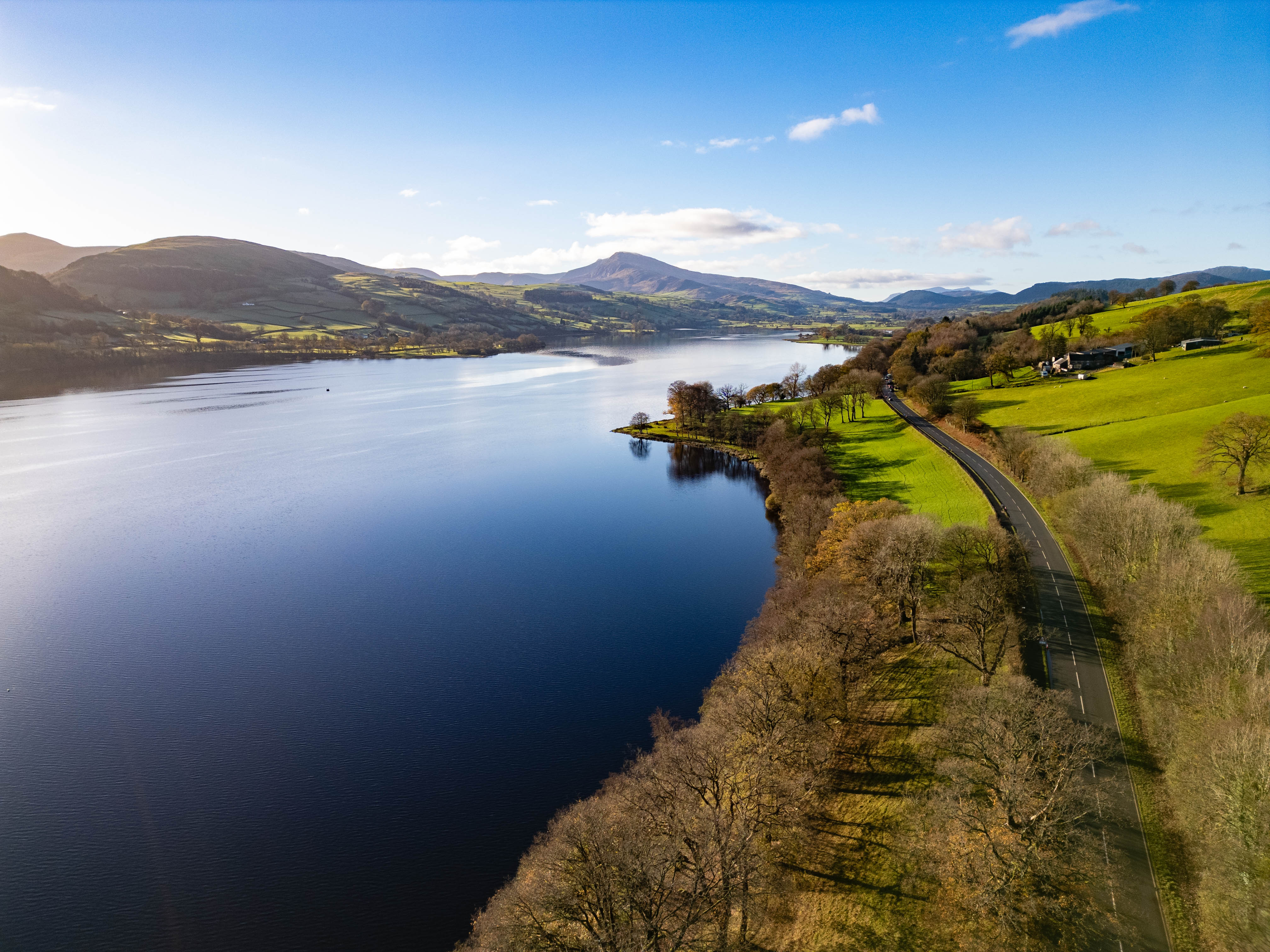
- View from near Llanycil

- Location within Wales Location within Gwynedd
- Location: Wales
- Coordinates: 52°53′N 3°38′W
- Type: natural
- Primary inflows: River Dee
- Primary outflows: River Dee
- Basin countries: United Kingdom
- Max. length: 3.7 mi (6.0 km)
- Max. width: 0.5 mi (0.8 km)
- Surface area: 1.87 sq mi (4.8 km^{2})
- Max. depth: 138 ft (42 m)
- Settlements: Bala

Ramsar Wetland
- Official name: Llyn Tegid
- Designated: 7 November 1991
- Reference no.: 535

Llyn Tegid (Welsh pronunciation: [ˈɬɨ̞n ˈtɛɡɨd]), also known as Bala Lake or Lake Bala in English, is a large freshwater glacial lake in Gwynedd, Wales. The River Dee, which has its source on the slopes of Dduallt in the mountains of Snowdonia, feeds the 3.7-by-0.5-mile (5.95 km × 0.80 km) lake. It was the largest natural body of water in Wales even before its level was raised by Thomas Telford to provide water for the Ellesmere Canal (later Llangollen Canal).

The town of Bala, which was once an important centre for the North Wales woollen trade, is located on the north-eastern end of the lake. The 3-mile (4.8 km) narrow-gauge Bala Lake Railway, between the town and Llanuwchllyn (whose name means "The Llan above ['uwch'] the lake ['llyn']"), runs along the lake's south-eastern shore using a section of former trackbed from the former Ruabon–Barmouth line.

== Toponyms ==
=== Previous names ===
Gerald of Wales records the lake in his 12th century Itinerarium Cambriae under the name Penmelesmere. In his 1804 translation of Gerald's work, Sir Richard Colt Hoare states that the lake was also referred to as Pymplwy meer deriving from "pum plwyf" (five parishes). This name refers to the parishes of Llandderfel, Llanfawr, Llanycil, Llanuwchllyn and Llangywer. This name was also recorded by other English writers as "Pimble-mere" (in the 1813 Cambrian Travellers' Guide) and "Pemble Mere".

=== Modern names ===
The Modern Welsh name "Llyn Tegid" first appears in the Cronica Walliae, published in 1568. The name is translated by George Borrow as "Lake of Beauty". However, Welsh place-name scholar Hywel Wyn Owen identifies the Tegid in Llyn Tegid as a personal name, which derives from Latin Tacitus.

The lake is also called "Bala Lake" in English, after the nearby town of Bala. "Bala" means "outlet of a lake" in Welsh, giving "Bala Lake" a partly tautological meaning. The usage of the English name in preference to the Welsh name has been controversial. In 2023, the Eryri National Park Authority voted to use Welsh names for its lakes, favouring Llyn Tegid in English-language usage.

== Geology ==
The lake formed in a glacial valley along the fault line between Bala and Tal-y-Llyn. Towards the end of the last ice age, the receding Dee valley glacier left a recessional moraine, effectively damming the valley so resulting in the establishment of the lake, and on which the town of Bala now stands.

== Wildlife ==
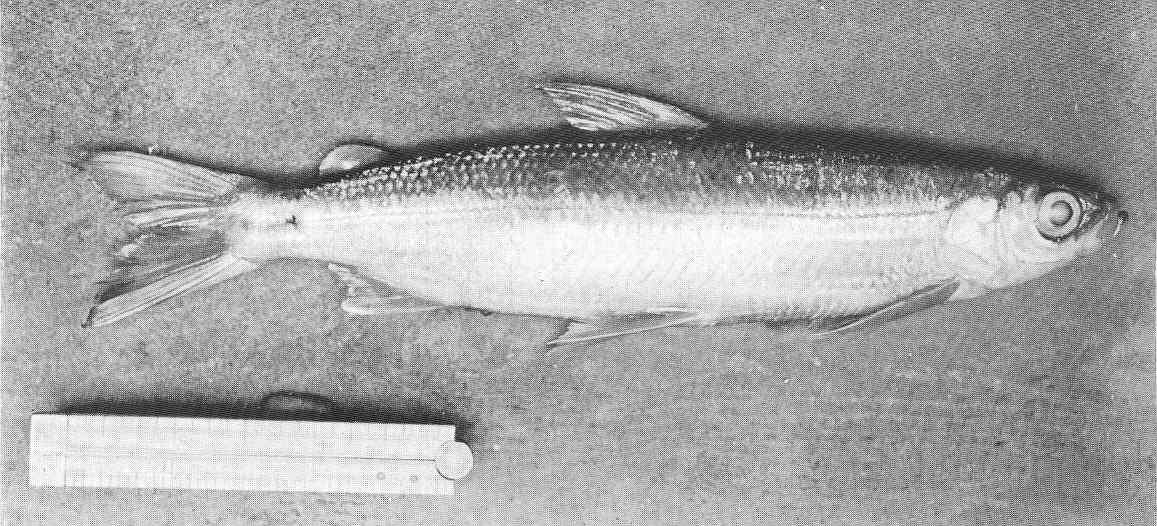
The gwyniad, only native to this lake.

The lake has abundant pike, perch, brown trout, roach, and eel. It also contains the gwyniad, a fish unique to the locality and listed as critically endangered by the IUCN due to the introduction of the invasive and non native ruffe; and the very rare mollusc Myxas glutinosa (the glutinous snail). According to legend, whilst the Dee itself flows through the lake, the waters never mix. However, this was not confirmed by the detailed limnological work undertaken from the 1990s, to understand and manage the occurrence of algal blooms on the lake.

In the 1990s the lake suffered from blooms of blue-green algae which indicated a significant and worrying eutrophication of the lake. Investigation by the Environment Agency, in partnership with the water industry, the farming community and others, has put in place a plan for reducing pollution inputs to the lake.

== Water management ==
The lake forms part of the River Dee regulation system and the level at its outflow is automatically controlled. Depending on flow conditions and the level of water in Llyn Celyn, water can flow either into or out of the lake at the normal outflow point. Controls on the level of water in the lake were first constructed around 1840. Sluices designed and built by Thomas Telford and William Jessop were installed to ensure that the newly constructed Ellesmere Canal had a constant and sufficient supply of water. In the 1950s, these sluices were removed when the Dee and Clwyd River Authority constructed a new outlet channel and sluices to better control flooding of the upper Dee caused by uncontrolled releases of water from the lake. The operation of these sluices enables the lake to operate as water storage or water capacitance in the Dee system and thus allow water to be abstracted at Huntington near Chester, England in order to supply fresh water to the Wirral, England. The sluices allows water stored in the lake between 159.2m OD and 163.5m OD (4.3m height difference) to be utilised in managing the flow in the Dee. This body of water is estimated to be some 18,000,000 m^{3}

== Recreation ==
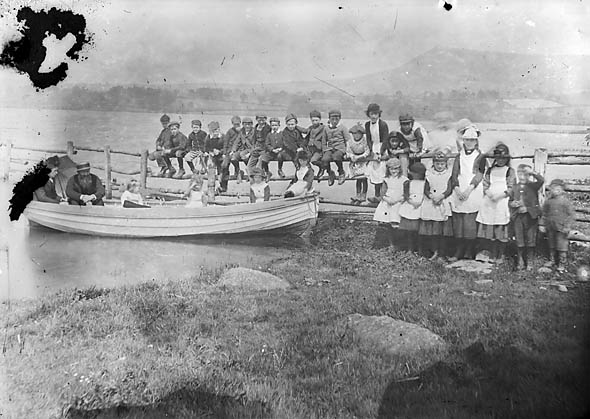
A group of children by a sailing dinghy c. 1885

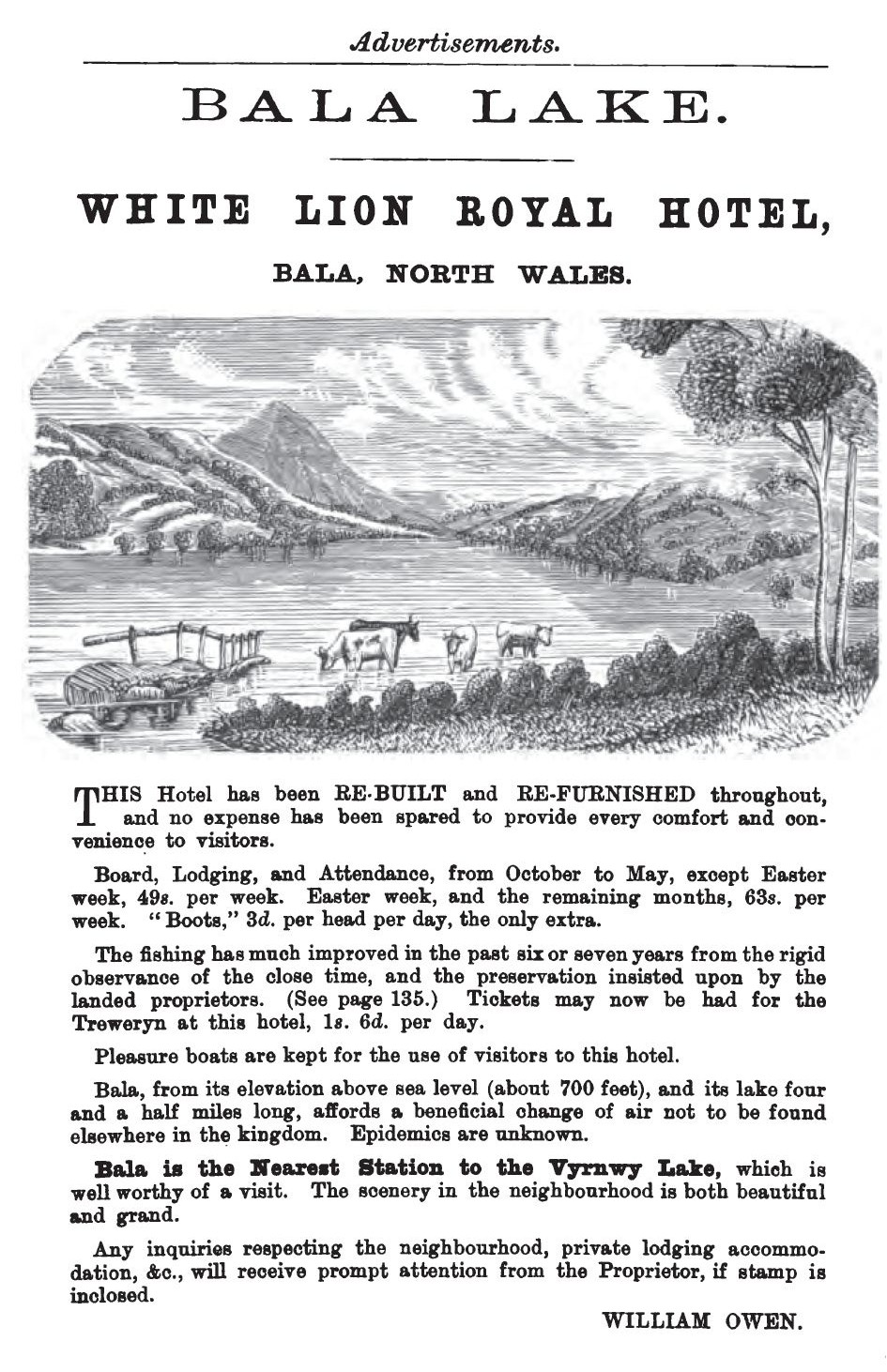
The lake in an 1893 advertisement for the White Lion Royal Hotel in Bala

Bala has been a tourist destination since the early 19th century. With the advent of the railways, Bala saw a growth in visitor numbers. This continued with the invention of the motor vehicle. The lake remains popular; it has two sailing clubs, and a number of companies provide kayaks, yachts and various other types of boats for hire.

== In Welsh mythology ==
There was a belief in Wales that certain lakes are offended when mortals attempt to measure their depths. Two men went out in a boat to the deepest part of the lake to measure it with a plummet and line. They were angrily warned by the lake to return to the shore or face destruction.

=== Tegid Foel ===
The mythological figure Tegid Foel (English: Bald Tegid) is associated with the lake. He was the husband of the goddess or witch Ceridwen and the place where his court stood is now beneath the waters of the lake. According to Taliesin, the 6th century CE early Brittonic poet of Sub-Roman Britain whose work survived in a Middle Welsh manuscript, the Book of Taliesin, Tegid Foel's entire court was drowned in one night. Although in legend, its lights and the little town around it can still be seen on moonlit nights.

The drowning of the court of Tegid Foel also survives in a variant folktale. Near the lake was a walled spring that had to be secured and locked every night with a lid so that the spring water would not be corrupted by supernatural influences. For whatever reason, the man responsible for this task neglected his duty, though some say the Devil had found a way to open it. In any event, the water burst forth from the spring and completely drowned a nearby town, and this is how the lake was formed.

=== "Teggie" ===
"It was said Llyn Tegid (now called Bala Lake) was bottomless. Centuries ago an expert diver tried it, but was terribly frightened by his experience. He asserted that a dragon was coiled up at the bottom of the lake, and if he had not been very careful the creature would have swallowed him."

— Folk-Lore and Folk Stories of Wales, Marie Trevelyan 1909.

Many of Wales' largest lakes feature in Welsh mythology, often associated with lake monsters, called afancod. The legend of such a creature in this lake was recorded in 1909, when the folklorist Marie Trevelyan collated a number of local legends including the story of a coiled dragon-like creature living in the lake some centuries earlier.

Modern reports of sightings have been recorded since the 1920s. These include strange disruptions of the water's surface, disturbance of watercraft and the increase in local belief that a beast was living below the lake's surface. Of these sightings, the most notable was reported by the lake's manager Dowie Bowen in the 1970s. Bowen described seeing a crocodile-like creature, about eight feet (2.4 m) in length emerge from the water. Bowen's report was followed by another sighting in 1979, when a fisherman visiting the lake also described seeing a large hump-backed beast at the water's surface. By the 1990s the various sightings had attracted film crews and investigators. One Japanese crew spent three days investigating and filming the lake using specialist diving equipment and a submarine. However, no evidence for the creature's existence has been found.

The lake is the home to a unique and extant fish species, the gwyniad. The survival of the gwyniad has led to discussions as to whether the lake could support a larger predator, and whether such a creature could survive in its isolated environment into modern times. Supporters for the potential existence of an afanc creature suggest that both the lake's size (40 metres deep and almost 6 km long) and the abundance of potential prey within it (pike, perch, brown trout and eels) would be able to support a single large predator or even a breeding population.
