= Rhobell Fawr =

- The summit of Rhobell Fawr

Highest point
- Elevation: 734 m (2,408 ft)
- Prominence: 309 m (1,014 ft)
- Parent peak: Arenig Fawr
- Listing: Marilyn, Hewitt, Nuttall
- Coordinates: 52.814°N 3.802°W

Naming
- Pronunciation: Welsh: [ˈr̥ɔbɛɬ ˈvaur]

Geography
- Location: Gwynedd, Wales
- Parent range: Snowdonia
- OS grid: SH786256
- Topo map: OS Landranger 124

Listed summits of Rhobell Fawr
Name	Grid ref	Height	Status
Dduallt		662 m (2,172 ft)	Hewitt, Nuttall
Cynefin Bryn Blew (Rhobell Fawr West Top)		719 m (2,359 ft)	Sub Nuttall (hill)
Rhobell Ganol		521 m (1,709 ft)	TuMP
Rhobell-y-big		504 m (1,654 ft)	Dodd (hill), Dewey (hill)

Rhobell Fawr is a mountain and the site of an ancient volcano that was active during the Early Ordovician period in the Arenig range within the Snowdonia National Park.

Despite its modest height of 734 m (2,408 feet), it is a mountain with views of higher peaks all around, including the north face of Cadair Idris and distant Snowdon.

The paths are not well trodden, but there is a distinct path up from Bwlch Goriwared, a couple of miles north-north-east of the small village of Llanfachreth.
