= Hightown Halt railway station =

Former railway station in Wrexham, Wales

Hightown Halt

General information
- Location: Caia Park, Wrexham County Borough; Wales
- Coordinates: 53.0406°N 2.9792°W
- Grid reference: SJ344497
- Platforms: 1

Other information
- Status: Disused

History
- Original company: Great Western Railway
- Post-grouping: Great Western Railway

Key dates
- 9 July 1923: Opened
- 10 June 1940: closed
- 6 May 1946: reopened
- 10 September 1962: Closed
Location

Hightown Halt railway station was a station in Caia Park, Wrexham, Wales. The station was opened on 9 July 1923 and closed on 10 September 1962.

Preceding station	Disused railways	Following station
Wrexham Central; Line and station open	Great Western Railway; Wrexham and Ellesmere Railway	Marchwiel; Line and station closed
