= Sesswick =

Community in Wrexham County Borough, Wales

Coordinates: 53.02165°N 2.92056°W

- Community
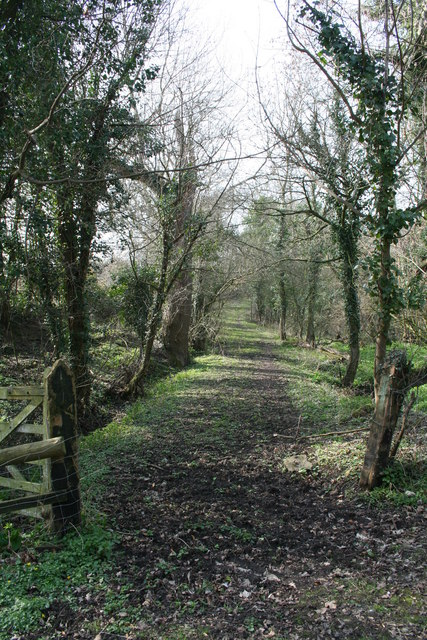
- Bridleway in the largely rural community of Sesswick
- Principal area: Wrexham
- Country: Wales
- Sovereign state: United Kingdom
- Ambulance: Welsh
- List of places UK Wales Map of the community

Sesswick is a community in Wrexham County Borough, Wales. It lies south-east of Wrexham near Marchwiel. The population of the community at the 2011 Census was 609.

The area was historically part of Denbighshire, where it was one of the townships of the parish of Bangor Monachorum (Bangor-on-Dee). The neighbouring township of Royton was incorporated in it in 1935.

The name Sesswick, recorded as Sesewyke in 1286, is one of the names indicating an early English presence in this part of north-east Wales; it is possibly derived from the Old English personal name "Seassa", along with -wic, meaning "settlement". However, the Wrexham historian Alfred Neobard Palmer, noting that the name was recorded as Chespric (actually Chespuic) in the Domesday of Cheshire, speculated that it may have come from "Chadswick" in reference to land in the township being owned by St. Chad, the first bishop of Mercia.

The community's only village is Cross Lanes: it also includes several small hamlets (though no settlement itself having the name of Sesswick). In the 2001 census Sesswick had a total population of 591 in 236 households.

The area gave its name to a rural station, Sesswick Halt railway station, on the former Cambrian Railways' Wrexham and Ellesmere Railway; the line and station closed in 1962.
