= Chester Weir =

Grade I listed weir in England

Coordinates: 53.1862°N 2.8879°W

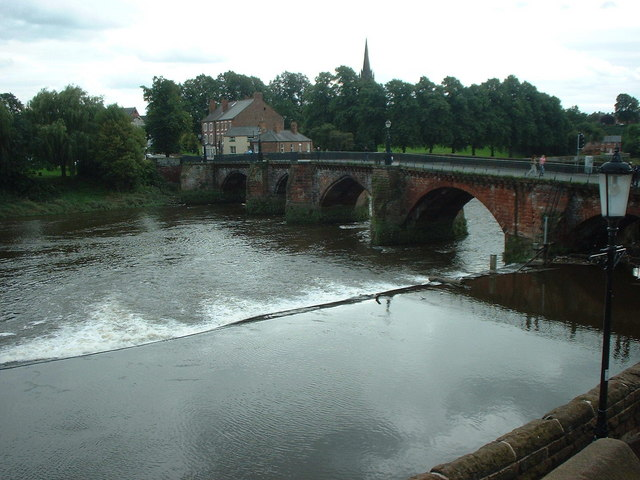
Chester weir and Old Dee Bridge on River Dee at Chester. The weir gate is between the two poles next to the bridge.

Chester Weir is a weir which crosses the River Dee at Chester, Cheshire, England, slightly upstream from the Old Dee Bridge (grid reference SJ407658). The weir and the associated salmon leap are recorded in the National Heritage List for England as a designated Grade I listed building.

This was originally the site of a causeway across the River Dee. The weir was built in sandstone in 1093 for Hugh Lupus, 1st Earl of Chester, for the Benedictine Abbey of St Werburgh (now Chester Cathedral). It was designed to provide a head of water for the medieval mills on the river. The mills were demolished during the 20th century and the weir was restored to serve the Chester City Council's hydro-electric power station, which operated from 1913 to 1939 on the site of the former mills.

The weir prevents tidal water ingress up-river for all but the highest tides; it provides the water head for an abstraction immediately behind the weir; and it holds back what is a long linear lake which enables that largest abstraction to be taken at Huntington for the United Utilities supply to the Wirral and surrounding areas.

The weir can be navigated by crossing over the top during high spring tides. On the city-side of the weir is the United Kingdom's only example of a weir gate, a low height single lock gate that can be opened to provide extra draft once the water levels on each side of the weir have equalised. This allows carefully planned passage from the non-tidal River Dee, via the short tidal estuary section, onto the Dee Branch of the Shropshire Union Canal (originally the Chester Canal) at certain times of year.

United Utilities vacated the turbine building in 2015, ending its use as a pump station, and allowing installation of a new hydro electric generating plant, planning for which is underway as of 2021, alongside a Green-Energy education centre and visitor attraction. However, as of late 2026, no work has commenced and the site remains derelict.

== See also ==
- Grade I listed buildings in Cheshire West and Chester
