= River Dee, Wales =

River in Wales and England

River Dee
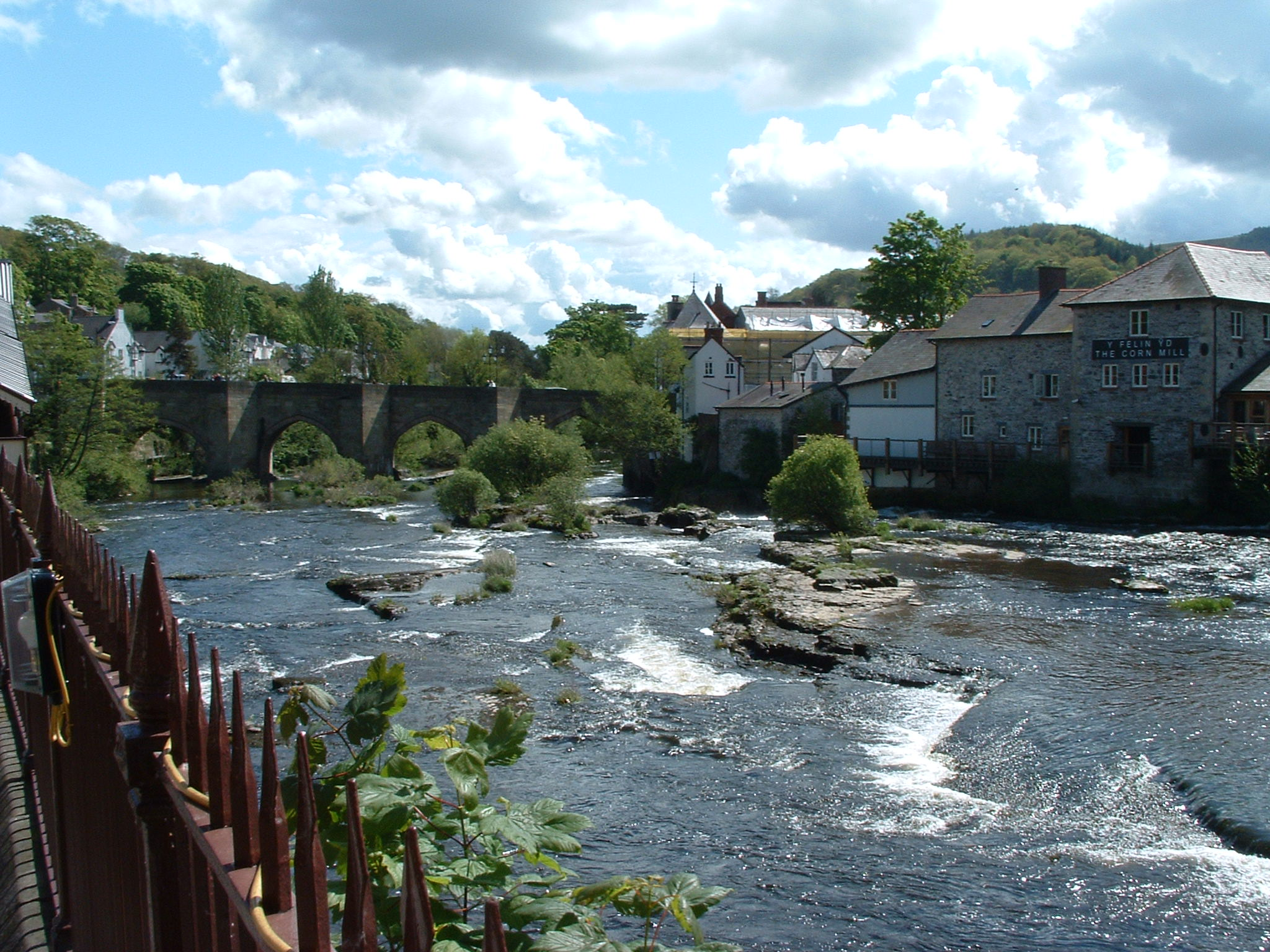
- River Dee at Llangollen

- Course of the River Dee
- Native name: Afon Dyfrdwy (Welsh)

Location
- Country: England and Wales
- Cities: Chester

Physical characteristics
- Source
  - location: slopes of Dduallt above Llanuwchllyn, Snowdonia, Wales
  - coordinates: 52.8322°N 3.7656°W
  - elevation: 450 m (1,480 ft)
- Mouth: Dee Estuary
  - coordinates: 53.3539°N 3.2258°W
  - elevation: 0 m (0 ft)
- Length: 113 km (70 mi)
- Basin size: 1,816.8 km^{2} (701.5 sq mi)
- Discharge
  - location: Chester Weir
  - average: 29.71 m^{3}/s (1,049 cu ft/s)
- Discharge
  - location: Manley Hall
  - average: 31.03 m^{3}/s (1,096 cu ft/s)
- Discharge
  - location: Llyn Tegid (Bala Lake)
  - average: 13.06 m^{3}/s (461 cu ft/s)

Basin features
- Tributaries
  - left: Tryweryn, Alwen, Clywedog, Alyn
  - right: Ceiriog, Wych Brook

The River Dee (Welsh: Afon Dyfrdwy, Latin: Deva Fluvius) flows through North Wales and Cheshire, England. Most of the river lies in Wales, with the stretch between Aldford and Saltney within England and two other sections forming the border between the two countries. The length of the section from Bala to Chester is 113 km (70 miles).

The river rises on Dduallt in Snowdonia and flows east through Llyn Tegid (Bala Lake), Corwen, and Llangollen. It turns north near Overton-on-Dee and forms part of the England–Wales border before fully entering England near Aldford, north-east of Wrexham. It flows through Chester then re-enters Wales near Saltney; the final section is canalised and discharges into the Irish Sea via an estuary 23 km (14 miles) long.

== History ==
The River Dee was the traditional boundary of the Kingdom of Gwynedd in Wales for centuries, possibly since its founding in the 5th century. It was recorded in the 13th century (in mainstream Middle English orthography, lacking the letters v and w) as flumen Dubr Duiu; the name appears to derive from the Brythonic dēvā: "River of the Goddess" or "Holy River". The river is personified as the war and fate goddess Aerfen.

The river name inspired the name of Roman fortress Deva Victrix.

It is the only river in the UK to be subject to a Water Protection Zone along its whole length down to Chester weir.

== Statistics ==
The total catchment area of the River Dee down to Chester Weir is 1,816.8 km^{2} (701.5 sq mi). The estimated average annual rainfall over the catchment area is 640 mm (25 in), yielding an average flow of 37 m^{3}/s. The larger reservoirs in the catchment area are:

- Llyn Tegid (Bala Lake): 1.87 square miles (4.8 km^{2})
- Llyn Brenig: 920 acres (3.7 km^{2})
- Llyn Celyn: 320 hectares (3.2 km^{2})

== Catchment ==
=== Natural course ===
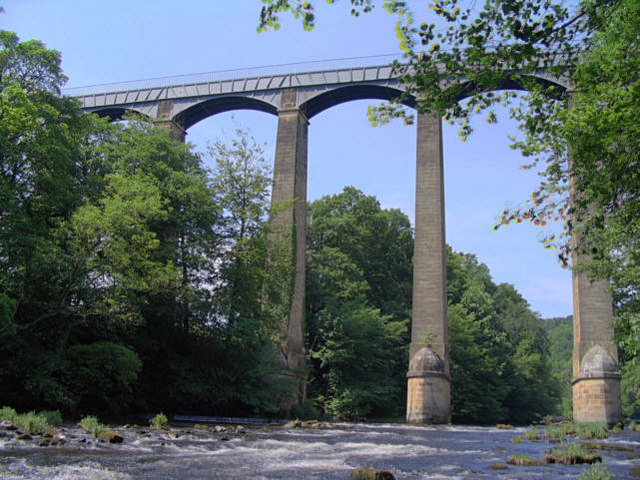
Pontcysyllte Aqueduct carrying the Llangollen Canal over the River Dee.

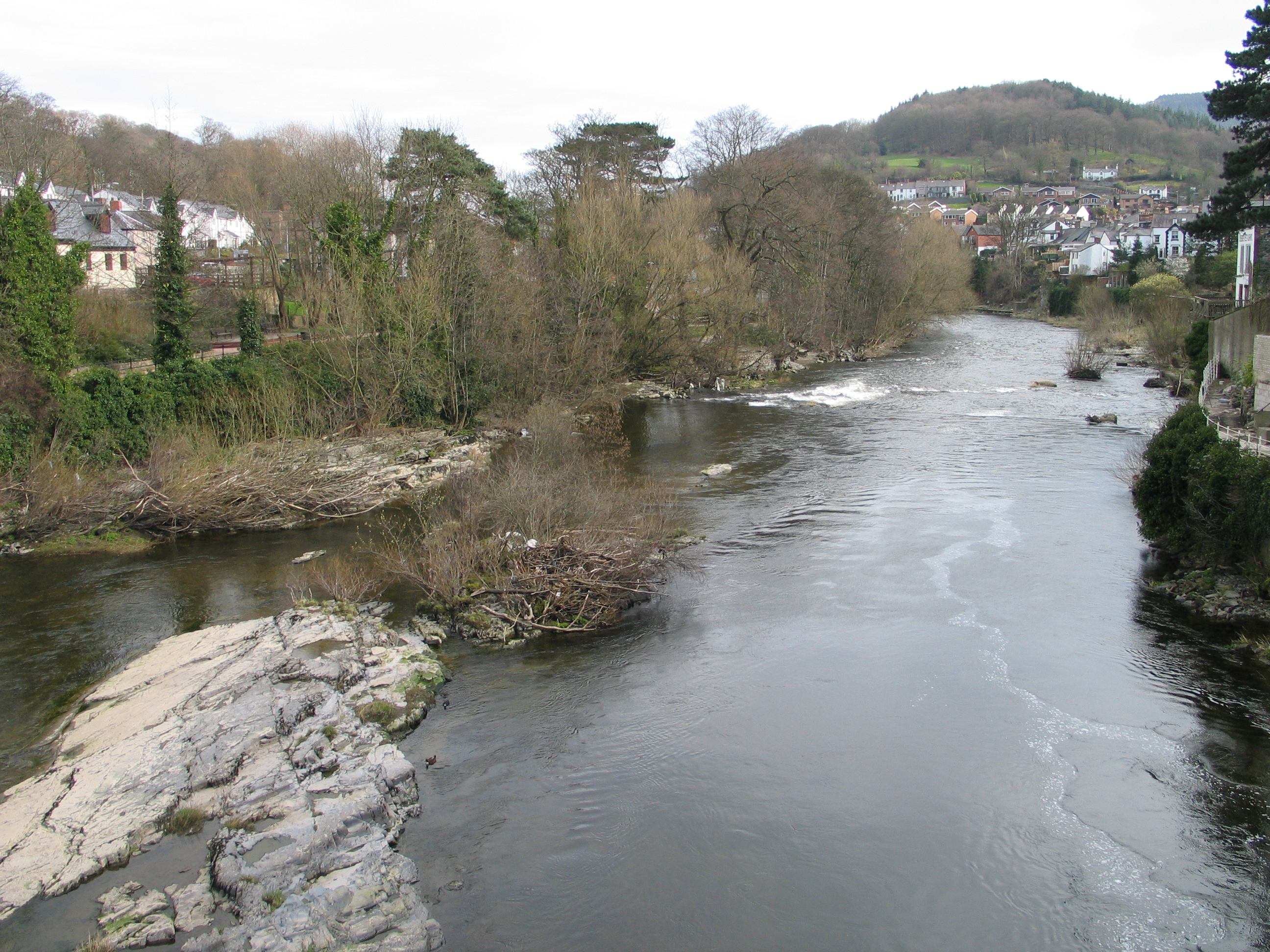
View downriver from the bridge in the centre of Llangollen (March 2007)

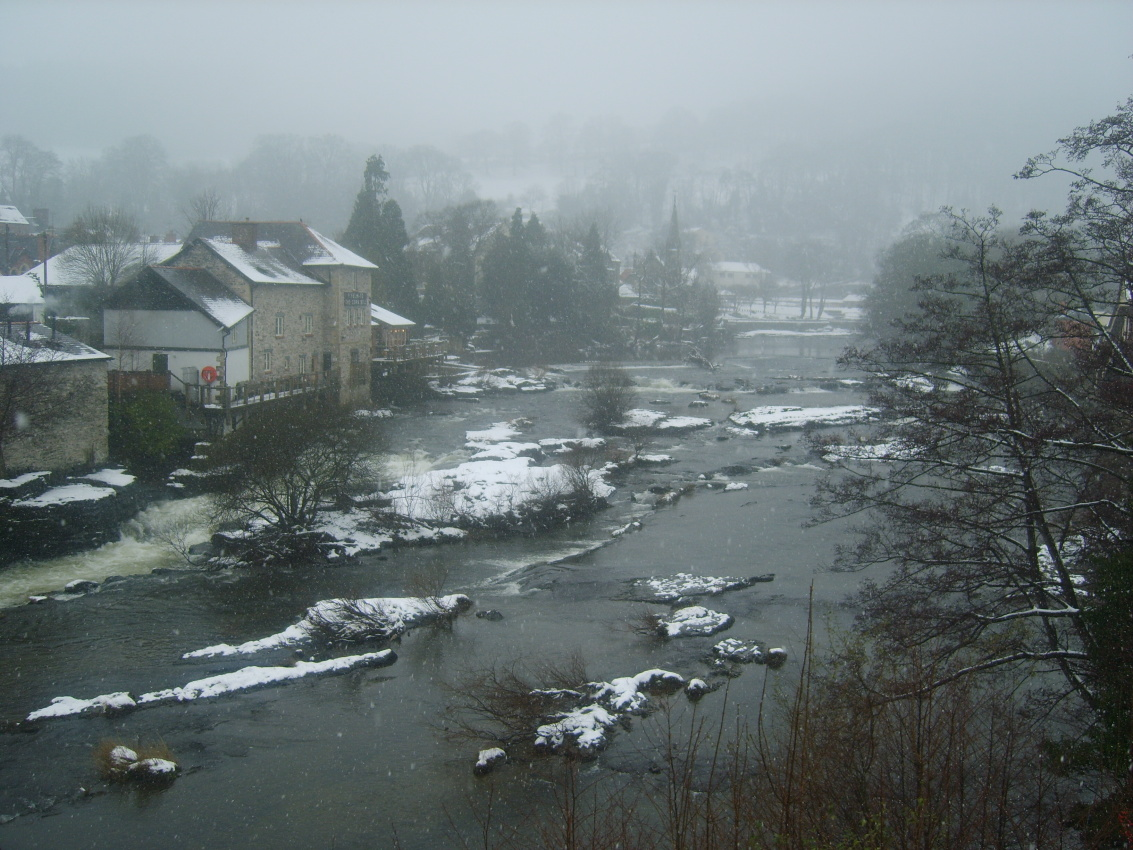
River Dee in snow at Llangollen (February 2007)

==== Source to Corwen ====
The River Dee has its source on the slopes of Dduallt above Llanuwchllyn in the mountains of Snowdonia in Meirionydd, Gwynedd, Wales. Between its source and Llyn Tegid the river is known by its Welsh name, Afon Dyfrdwy. Legend tells that the waters of the river pass through Llyn Tegid and emerge undiluted and unmixed at the outflow. On leaving Bala the river meets its confluence with Afon Tryweryn and passes through the Bala sluice gates, part of the Dee Regulation System protecting communities further downstream from severe flooding. Skirting the village of Llanfor, the path of the river takes it past Llandderfel and under the Grade II listed Pont Fawr bridge. The river trends generally northeast through the Vale of Edeyrnion, shadowed by the B4401 Bala to Cynwyd road. Leaving Gwynedd and entering Denbighshire the Dee flows beneath other historic bridges at Llandrillo and Cynwyd before arriving at the town of Corwen.

==== Corwen to Llangollen ====
From here the river passes the Iron Age hillfort of Caer Drewyn and enters the Clwydian Range and Dee Valley AONB. Through its forested valley the course takes it through Carrog, Glyndyfrdwy and Llantysilio, with the Llangollen Railway following the river on its route between Llangollen and Corwen.

At Berwyn the river passes over the manmade Horseshoe Falls, before picking up speed on a downhill gradient past the Chain Bridge Hotel and its historic pedestrian bridge. First built in 1814, and later refurbished by Henry Robertson in 1870, it was considered a marvel of early suspension bridge design. In 1928 the original bridge was destroyed by severe flooding and was rebuilt in its current form from original parts in 1929. The course of the river then takes it through Llangollen and under its 16th-century, Grade I listed bridge. The bridge is also a Scheduled Ancient Monument and considered one of the Seven Wonders of Wales.

==== Llangollen to Bangor-on-Dee ====
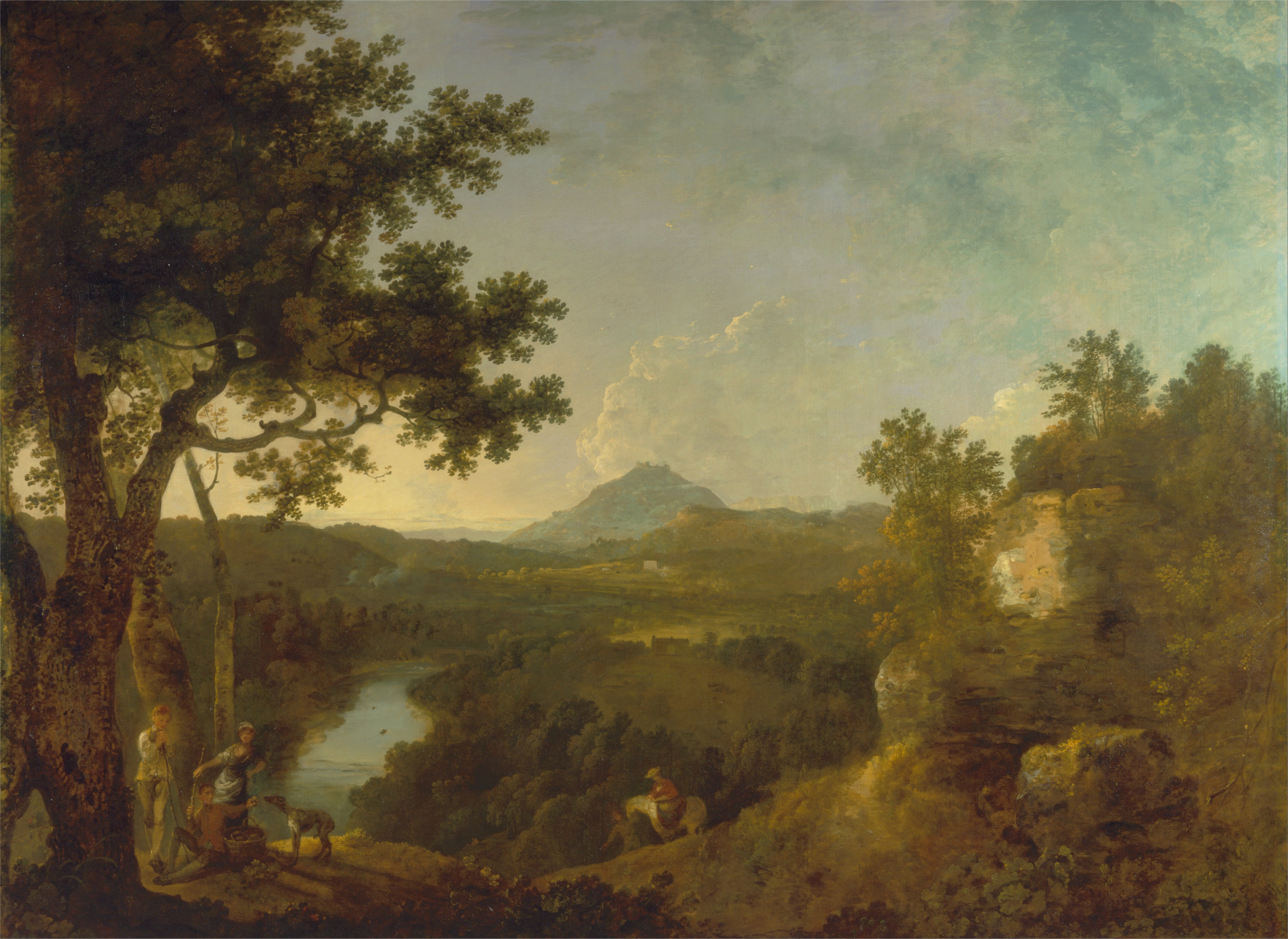
View near Wynnstay by Richard Wilson, 1771

On leaving Llangollen the river continues east, to the south of the Carboniferous Limestone exposures of Eglwyseg Rocks (Welsh: Creigiau Eglwyseg) and Trevor Rocks. Overlooking the river here is the medieval Castell Dinas Brân, a ruined fortress abandoned by John de Warenne, 6th Earl of Surrey in 1282. The river then enters Wrexham County Borough, passing south of Trevor and under Thomas Telford's Pontcysyllte Aqueduct, of 1805, which carries the Llangollen Canal 120 feet (37 m) overhead.

Less than a mile east of the aqueduct at Cefn Mawr, the river is crossed by the Cefn Mawr Viaduct, built in 1848 by Thomas Brassey and carrying the Shrewsbury to Chester railway line over the Dee. Beyond this point the river forms the boundary between Wrexham County Borough in Wales and Shropshire in the West Midlands of England. Passing Chirk and the confluence with the River Ceiriog, the river begins to trace gentle meanders on the level ground at the beginning of the Cheshire Plain. The course continues past Erbistock on the Welsh side, and the 5th-century earthwork of Wat's Dyke on the English, before passing wholly into Wales at Overton bridge. A couple more miles downstream is Bangor-on-Dee, known for its racecourse and its bridge. Until 1974 this area was part of an exclave of historic Flintshire known as English Maelor (Welsh: Maelor Saesneg).

==== Bangor to Eaton ====
The Dee continues to meander past Worthenbury where it is joined by the River Clywedog. At this point the border between Wrexham and Cheshire West and Chester follows the course of the river. It passes the Cheshire village of Crewe by Farndon, before cutting between Holt in Wales and Farndon in England beneath the 14th-century, Grade I listed Farndon Bridge.

One of the major tributaries of the Dee, the River Alyn (Afon Alun), crosses the Carboniferous Limestone from Mynydd Helygain (a.k.a. Halkyn Mountain) and runs down through the Loggerheads area before making its confluence north of Holt. Throughout the length of the Alyn there are numerous swallow holes and caverns and during the summer months long stretches of the river bed run dry. These caves include Ogof Hesp Alyn and Ogof Hen Ffynhonnau. A significant part of this lost flow reemerges in the Milwr Tunnel, a manmade tunnel, entering the west bank of the Dee estuary and carrying 12 million imperial gallons per day (600 L/s). This tunnel was originally constructed to drain metal mines in Halkyn Mountain. Once the main River Dee approaches the Cheshire border and the Carboniferous Coal Measures, it turns sharply northwards before meandering up to Chester. This long stretch of the river drops in height by only a few feet. The rich adjoining farmland has many remnants of abandoned coal workings and deep clay pits used to make bricks and tiles. A number of these pits are now being used as landfill sites for domestic and commercial waste. Approaching Churton and Aldford, the river crosses entirely into England, and passes the grand country house of Eaton Hall, seat of the Duke of Westminster.

==== Eaton to Chester ====
The river then continues past the village of Eccleston and beneath the A55 North Wales Expressway, tracing northwards past the Roman Eaton Road to the Chester suburbs of Huntington and Handbridge before reaching the centre of Chester. In the city centre the river passes and around the Earl's Eye(s) meadow at Queen's Park. In this vicinity, the riverside is used as a recreation area with a bandstand, benches and boat cruises, being crossed by four bridges. The first is the Queen's Park Suspension Bridge, which forms the only exclusively pedestrian footway across the river in Chester. The second is the Old Dee Bridge, a road bridge and by far the oldest bridge in Chester, being built in about 1387 on the site of a series of wooden predecessors which dated originally from the Roman period.

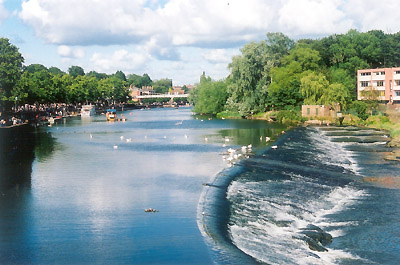
Chester Weir, Handbridge, Chester,(2002)

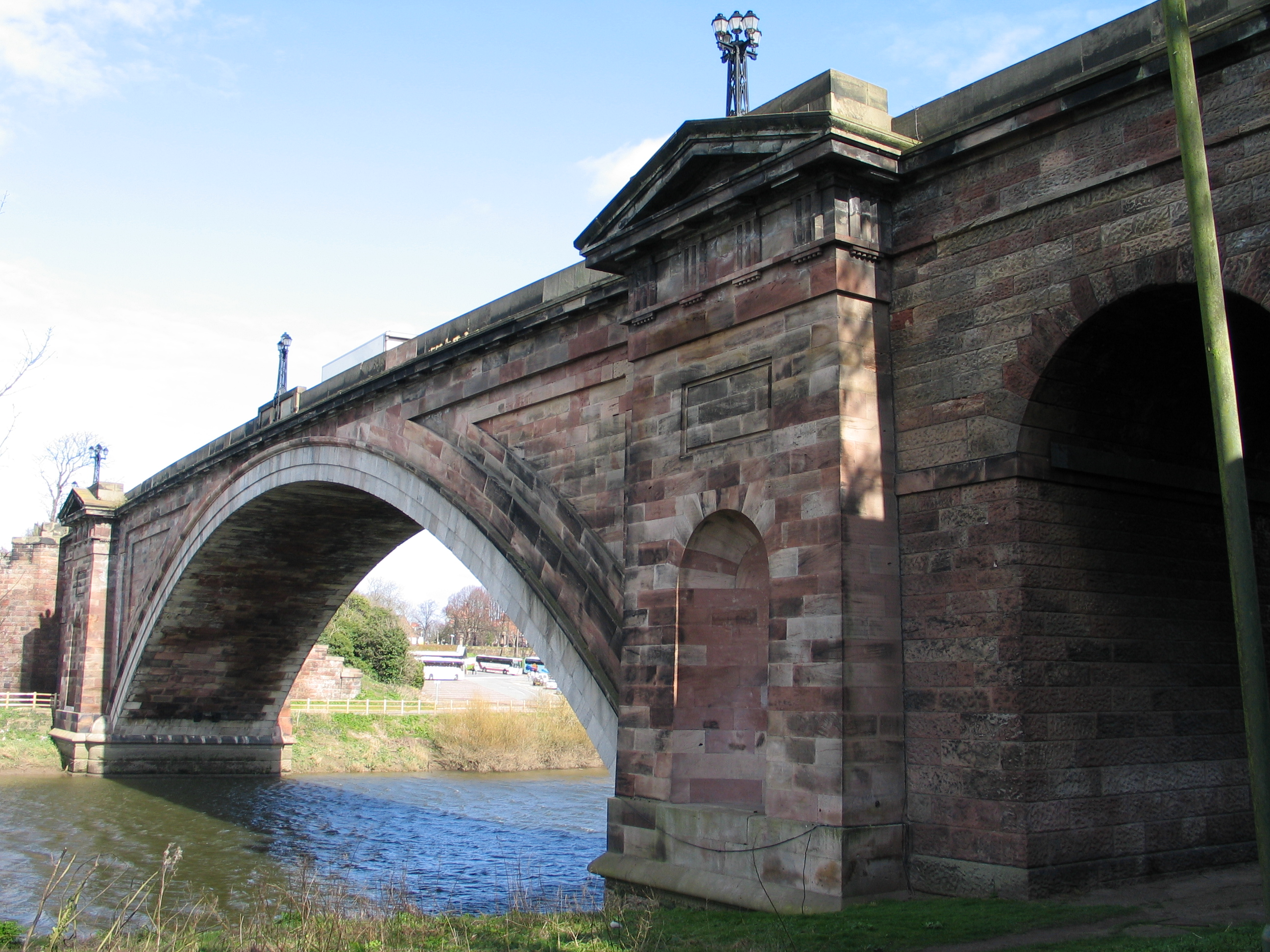
View of the Grosvenor Bridge, taken from the south bank of the river

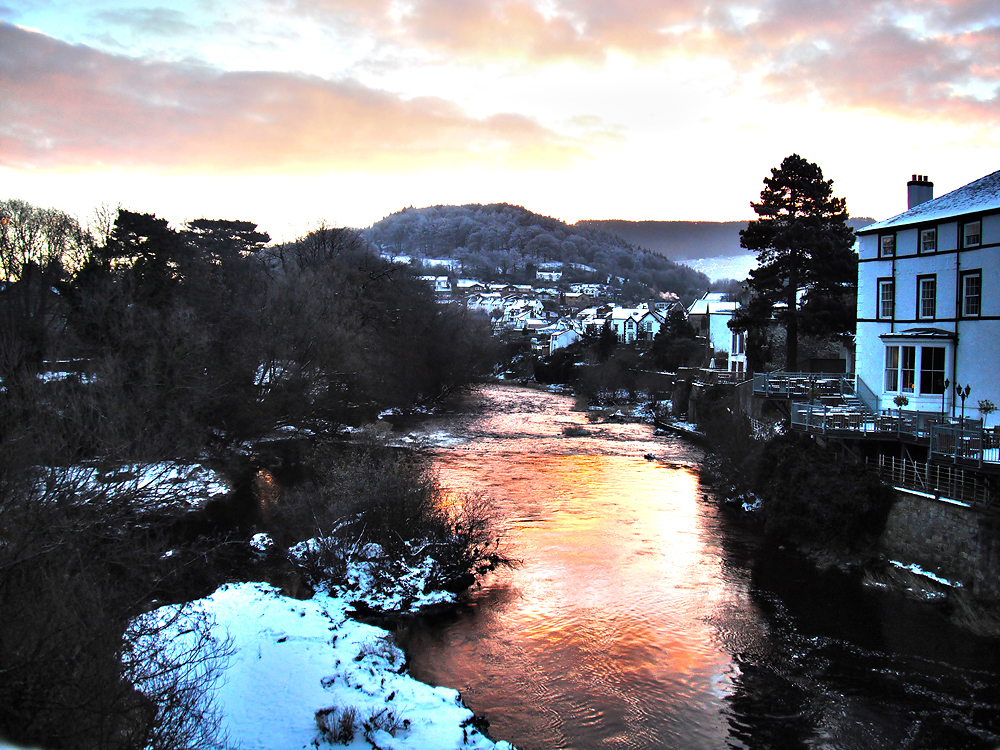
Winter sunrise at Llangollen

Above the Old Dee Bridge is Chester Weir, which was built by Hugh Lupus to supply power to his corn mills. Throughout the centuries the weir has been used to power corn, fulling, needle, snuff and flint mills. The same weir was used as part of a hydroelectric scheme in 1911 with the help of a small generator building which is still visible today, used as a pumping station for water since 1951. However the first water pumping station here was set up in 1600 by John Tyrer who pumped water to a square tower built on the city's Bridgegate. It was destroyed in the Civil War but an octagonal tower built in 1690 for the same purpose lasted until the gate was replaced with an arch in the mid-18th century.

On this weir is a fish pass and fish counting station to monitor the numbers of salmon ascending the river, and also a weirgate for navigating the weir at spring tides. A little further downstream stands the Grosvenor Bridge (designed by architect Thomas Harrison of Chester), which was opened in 1833 to ease congestion on the Old Dee Bridge. This bridge was opened by Princess Victoria five years before she became Queen.

The other side of the Grosvenor Bridge is the Roodee, Chester's racecourse and the oldest course in the country. This used to be the site of Chester's Roman harbour until, aided by the building of the weir, the River Dee silted up to become the size it is today. The only curiously remaining reminder of this site's maritime past is a stone cross which stands in the middle of the Roodee which exhibits the marks of water ripples. To the end of the Roodee the river is crossed by Chester's fourth bridge which carries the North Wales Coast railway line, before leaving Chester. This was the scene of one of the first serious railway accidents in the country, the Dee bridge disaster.

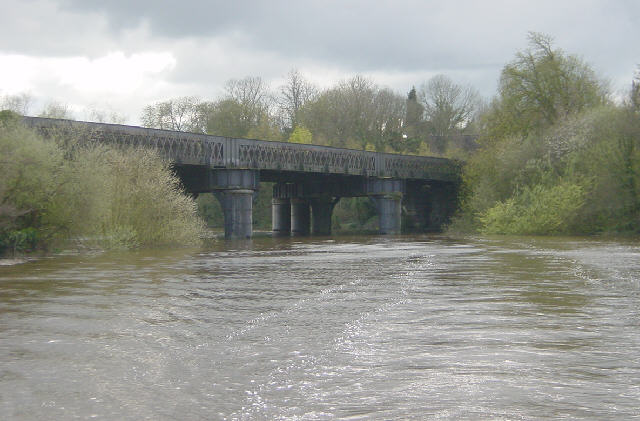
The bridge that carries the Chester and Holyhead Railway between Curzon Park and the Roodee at Chester

=== Canalised section ===
River Dee Navigation Act 1732
- Act of Parliament
- Parliament of Great Britain
- Long title: An Act to recover and preserve the Navigation of the River Dee, in the County Palatine of Chester.
- Citation: 6 Geo. 2. c. 30
- Territorial extent: Great Britain

Dates
- Royal assent: 13 June 1733
- Commencement: 16 January 1733 (Note: Start of session.)
Other legislation
| Amended by | River Dee Navigation Act 1740; River Dee Navigation Act 1743 |
| Relates to | River Dee, Chester Act 1698; River Dee Navigation Act 1753 |

Status: Amended

Text of statute as originally enacted

River Dee Navigation Act 1740
- Act of Parliament
- Parliament of Great Britain
- Long title: An Act for incorporating the Undertakers of the Navigation of the River Dee.
- Citation: 14 Geo. 2. c. 8
- Territorial extent: Great Britain

Dates
- Royal assent: 21 March 1741
- Commencement: 18 November 1740
Other legislation
| Amends | River Dee Navigation Act 1732 |
| Amended by | River Dee Navigation Act 1743 |
| Relates to | River Dee, Chester Act 1698; River Dee Navigation Act 1753 |

Status: Amended

Text of statute as originally enacted

River Dee Navigation Act 1743
- Act of Parliament
- Parliament of Great Britain
- Long title: An Act for explaining and amending an Act passed in the Sixth Year of His present Majesty's Reign, intituled, "An Act to recover and preserve the Navigation of the River Dee, in the County Palatine of Chester;" and another Act, passed in the Fourteenth Year of His present Majesty's Reign, intituled, "An Act for incorporating the Undertakers of the Navigation of the River Dee;" and for repealing the Tonnage Rates payable to the said Undertakers, and for granting to them other Tonnage or Keelage Rates in Lieu thereof; and for other Purposes therein mentioned.
- Citation: 17 Geo. 2. c. 28
- Territorial extent: Great Britain

Dates
- Royal assent: 12 May 1744
- Commencement: 1 December 1743
Other legislation
| Amends | River Dee Navigation Act 1732 |
| Relates to | River Dee, Chester Act 1698; River Dee Navigation Act 1753 |

Status: Current legislation

Text of statute as originally enacted

River Dee Navigation Act 1753
- Act of Parliament
- Parliament of Great Britain
- Long title: An Act for confirming an Agreement, entered into between the Company of Proprietors of the Undertaking for recovering and preserving the Navigation of the River Dee and Sir John Glynne Baronet, Lord of the Manor of Hawarden, and several Freeholders and Occupiers of Land within the said Manor; and for explaining and amending Three several Acts of Parliament, of the Sixth, Fourteenth, and Seventeenth Years of His present Majesty's Reign, for recovering and preserving the Navigation of the said River Dee.
- Citation: 26 Geo. 2. c. 35
- Territorial extent: Great Britain

Dates
- Royal assent: 15 May 1753
- Commencement: 11 January 1753
Other legislation
| Relates to | River Dee, Chester Act 1698; River Dee Navigation Act 1732; River Dee Navigation Act 1740; River Dee Navigation Act 1743 |

Status: Current legislation

Text of statute as originally enacted

West of Chester, the river flows along an artificial channel excavated by the Dee Navigation Company between 1732 and 1736. The work was planned and undertaken by engineers from the Netherlands and paid for by local merchants and Chester Corporation. It was an attempt to improve navigation for shipping and reduce silting. Chester's trade had declined steadily since the end of the 17th century as sediment had prevented larger craft reaching the city, spelling the end for the Port of Chester.

After four years' work, the river was diverted from its meandering natural course which passed Blacon, Saughall, Shotwick Castle, Burton and Parkgate and up the west shore of Wirral. Instead, the new canalised section followed the coast along northeast Wales. During this time, Sealand and Shotton were reclaimed from the estuary. Land reclamation in this area continued until 1916. The river's natural course can still be determined by following the bank and low bluffs that mark the western edge of the Wirral Peninsula.

The manmade channel, which runs in a straight line for 8 km (5 miles), passes into Wales and Flintshire at Saltney. On the west shore is Hawarden Airport and the large Airbus factory at Broughton. This region is known as Deeside and contains several heavy industries. From here the Dee passes beneath three road bridges. The first two are adjacent to each other at Queensferry. They are a 1960s fixed-arch bridge carrying the A494 Queensferry to Dolgellau trunk road and its predecessor the Jubilee Bridge, which is a rolling bascule bridge completed in 1926. The third crossing, and the most recent, is at Connah's Quay. The Flintshire Bridge is a fixed cable-stayed bridge that opened in 1999.

Between the second and third road bridges is Hawarden railway bridge at Shotton, originally constructed as a swing bridge but now never opened. It carries the Bidston to Wrexham Central Borderlands Line over the river. Hawarden Bridge station serves the Deeside Industrial Park, Deeside Power Station and the works at Dee Marsh.

A footbridge replaced the passenger ferry at Saltney in the 1970s.

=== Estuary ===
Beyond Connah's Quay the river opens out into the Dee Estuary, forming the northeastern-most section of the North Wales coast and the western coast of the Wirral. Towns along the coast include Flint, Holywell and Mostyn on the Welsh side and Neston, Parkgate, Heswall, West Kirby and Hoylake on the Wirral side. South of Bagillt and Parkgate the Dee Estuary forms the boundary between the local authority areas of Flintshire and Cheshire West and Chester. Northwards it forms the boundary with the Metropolitan Borough of Wirral in Merseyside, North West England. The estuary continues to widen until finally entering the Irish Sea and Liverpool Bay between the northernmost point of mainland Wales, Point of Ayr at Talacre, Flintshire and Hilbre Point, near Hoylake and West Kirby in Wirral, Merseyside. Hilbre Island, part of Wirral, straddles the mouth of the estuary at this point. The waters of the Dee then converge with those of the River Mersey and Ribble, producing a notable drop in salinity and increase in sediment which can be tracked a considerable distance along the Sefton and Lancashire coasts.

The estuary is hugely important for birdlife and has been designated both as an SSSI and as a Ramsar site accordingly. Its value lies in the huge expanses of mud which are exposed between tides and the extensive saltmarsh developed on both sides but principally on the right bank north and south of Neston.

The estuary owes its origins to the scouring of a broad channel through the Triassic sandstones and Carboniferous mudstones by glacial ice during successive ice ages to form an iceway. The channel continues inland south of Chester but its higher reaches have long since been infilled with sand, gravel and mud. The process of infilling by mud continues to the present day as the rapid growth of the saltmarsh in the last century testifies, pushing the high tide line further out into the estuary.

== Uses ==
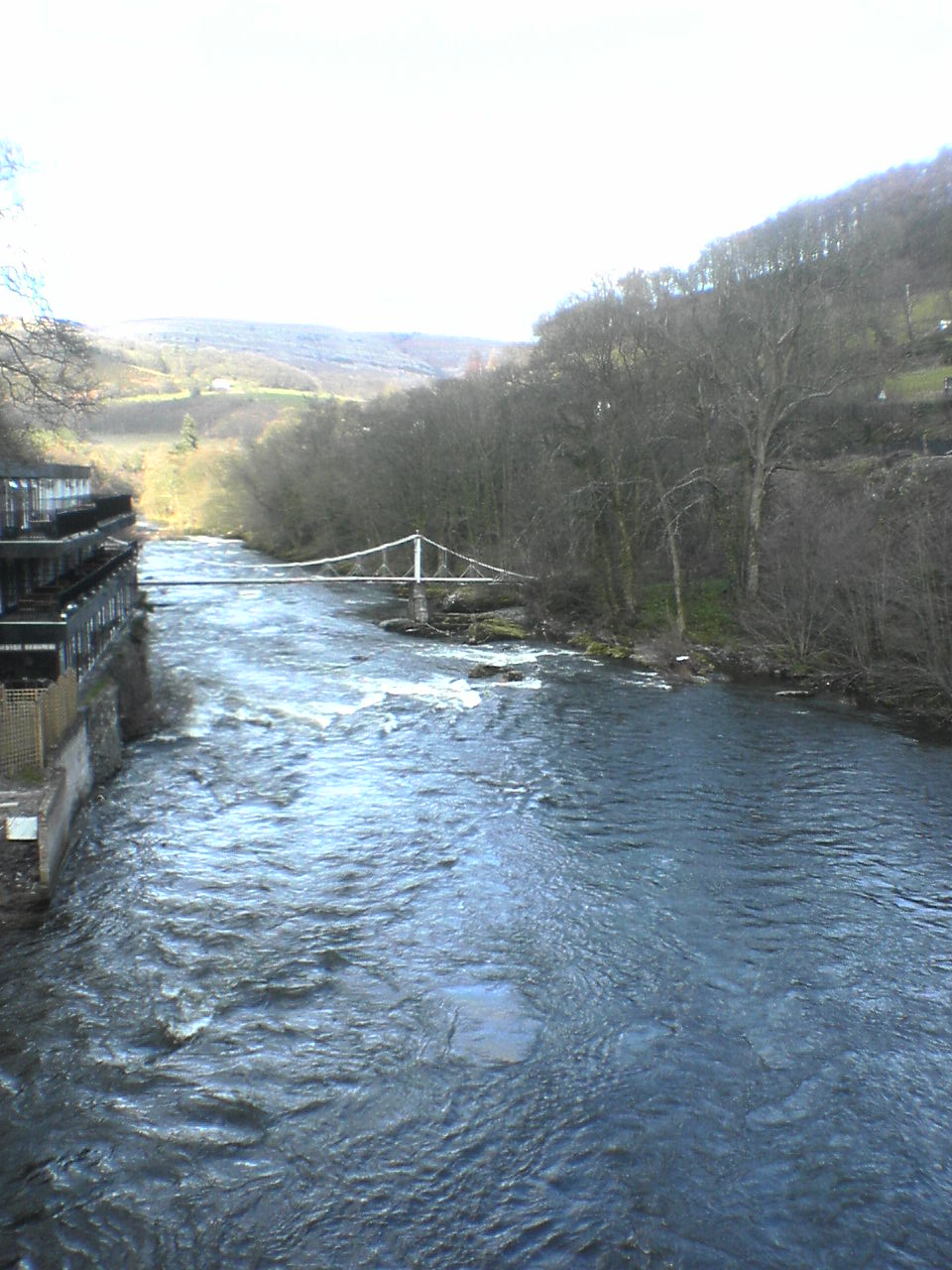
The Chainbridge at Berwyn about three miles (5 km) upstream from Llangollen

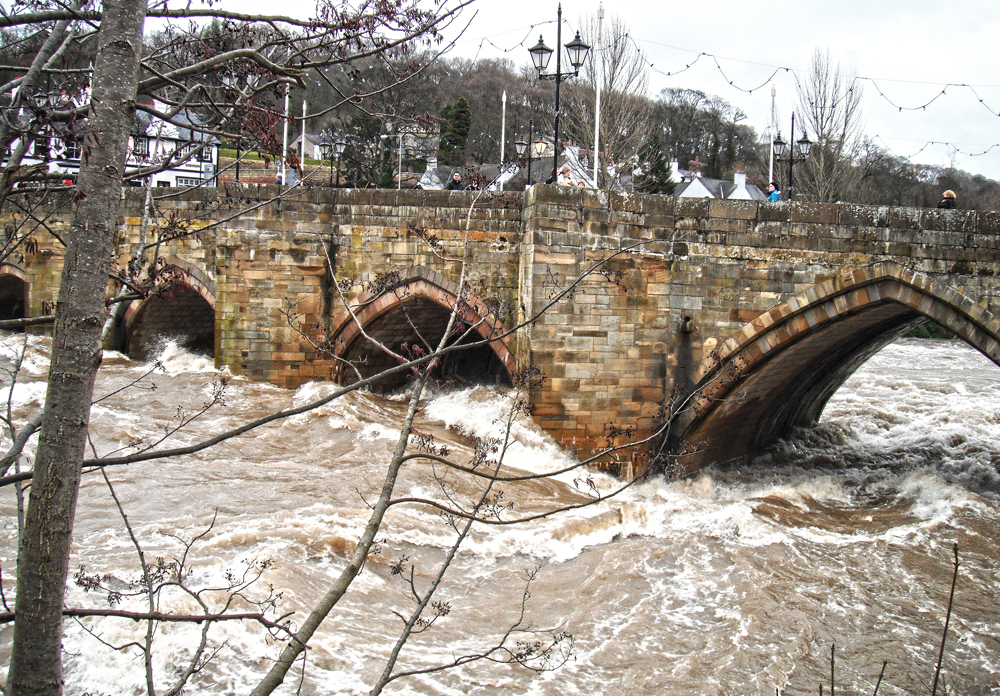
The River Dee at Llangollen, after stormy weather

=== Industry ===
Large parts of the catchment are devoted to agriculture and there a number of abstractions made from the river for summer irrigation. The volumes involved are not however significant.

From Chirk downstream, the river valley has supported a wide range of industries that were initially drawn to the area by the presence of coal mines and later by the deep deposits of Carboniferous clays used to make bricks and tiles.

Drone footage of a wing being transported from its factory at Broughton, Wales down the River Dee to Mostyn, and onwards to France; March 2020.

The coal industry in particular gave rise to a number of chemical industries some of which survive to this day and which both take water from the river and discharge their cleaned up effluent back into the river. Industries in the valley include commercial chemicals manufacture, wood chip and MDF fabrication, cocoa milling, fibreglass manufacture, waste disposal (in old clay pits) and a great variety of smaller industries concentrated around Wrexham. The main impact on the river of these industries is their thirst for a dependable good quality water supply.

Previously the wings for the Airbus A380, which were made at Airbus's manufacturing factory in Broughton, were taken downriver by barge to the Port of Mostyn because they were too large to be shipped in an Airbus Beluga. However, the dredging of the river for the barge may be responsible for a weakening of the tidal bore.

=== Abstractions ===
There are a number of direct water abstractions upstream of Chester by three water companies and by the canal. The size of the abstraction is very large compared to the summer flow and the flow in the river is very highly regulated through the use of reservoirs to store water in the winter and release it in the summer. The whole system is managed as the Dee Regulation Scheme. Below Chester water is also abstracted as cooling water by the gas-fired power station at Connah's Quay. Process and cooling water is also abstracted for the paper mill and power station at Shotton.

=== Water sport ===
The Dee is a popular whitewater kayaking and touring (particularly the grade III/IV whitewater section upstream of Llangollen). It stays high after rain for longer than most British rivers and is paddleable year-round (thanks to the Dee Regulation Scheme). Canoeing used to be allowed on about twelve weekends per year, and tens of thousands of canoeists descended on Llangollen for recreational paddling (several Dee tours were held every winter), slalom competitions, and wild water races.

In 2003, negotiations with the angling associations owning fishing rights on the Dee broke down. The anglers wanted to restrict the numbers of paddlers on the river when paddling was allowed but the Welsh Canoe Association wanted to renew the previous agreement. In November 2004, a protest about the lack of access on the Dee, and to rivers across England and Wales, was held in Llangollen. Following the failure of the access agreement, the Welsh Canoeing Association advises canoeists to use their own judgement about using the river, which in practice means many canoeists use the river at will from the numerous access points along its banks.

Canoeing is permitted on one 100 m long rapid, 1 km upstream of Llangollen. Wildwater and slalom races are still held at Serpent's Tail rapid upstream of Llangollen.

Each April since 2023 the River Dee has hosted DeeFest, a whitewater kayaking festival.

A major tributary of the Dee, the River Tryweryn, supports a wide range of water sports and hosts the Canolfan Tryweryn - the national white water centre for Wales.

Each July the Chester Raft Race is held on the Dee in aid of charity.

The Deva (Chester) Triathlon uses the Dee for the swim leg of the race.

The rowing clubs on the Dee are Royal Chester Rowing Club (hosting also Chester University Rowing Club) and Grosvenor Rowing Club. King's School Rowing Club and Queens Park High School are school-dedicated rowing clubs. All these share the slightly meandering Chester/lower reach above the weir.

=== Fishing ===
The river has been famed as a mixed fishery with salmon and trout fishing, mostly in the upper waters and a good coarse fishery in the lower reaches. A major pollution incident in the middle reaches in the late 1990s did extensive damage to the fishery from which it is now largely recovered.

Afon Dyfrdwy (River Dee)
- Site of Special Scientific Interest
- Location of Afon Dyfrdwy (River Dee).
- Area of search: Clwyd
- Interest: Biological/Geological
- Area: 1,489.5 hectares (3,681 acres)
- Notification date: 1995

== Site of Special Scientific Interest ==
Afon Dyfrdwy (River Dee) is a Site of Special Scientific Interest (SSSI) in the preserved county of Clwyd, along the River Dee, as is the nearby River Dee (England) SSSI in England. The Dee Cliffs at Farndon, Cheshire, are designated as a separate SSSI, as are the Dee Marshes on the northern (English) side of the estuary.

The river has been designated as a Special Area of Conservation because of its role as a habitat for Atlantic salmon and floating water plantain.

== See also ==
- Aerfen, the Celtic Goddess of the river.
- List of crossings of the River Dee, Wales
- List of SSSIs in Clwyd
- "Miller of Dee", a traditional folk song

== Bibliography ==
- Place, G. W. (1994). The Rise and Fall of Parkgate, Passenger Port for Ireland. ISBN 9780948789939.
- Emery, Gordon (1999). Curious Chester. ISBN 1-872265-94-4.
- Emery, Gordon (1998). Chester Inside Out. ISBN 1-872265-92-8.
- Emery, Gordon (2003). The Chester Guide. ISBN 1-872265-89-8.
- Emery, Gordon, ed. (October 2005). The Old Chester Canal. ISBN 1-872265-88-X.
- Emery, Gordon (2002). Chester Electric Lighting Station. ISBN 1-872265-48-0.
- Wilding, Roy (1997). Miller of Dee. ISBN 1-872265-95-2.
- Wilding, Roy (2003). Death in Chester. ISBN 1-872265-44-8.
- Lewis, P. R. (2007). Disaster on the Dee: Robert Stephenson's Nemesis of 1847. Tempus Publishing. ISBN 978-0-7524-4266-2.
