= Dduallt =

Mountain in Gwynedd, Wales

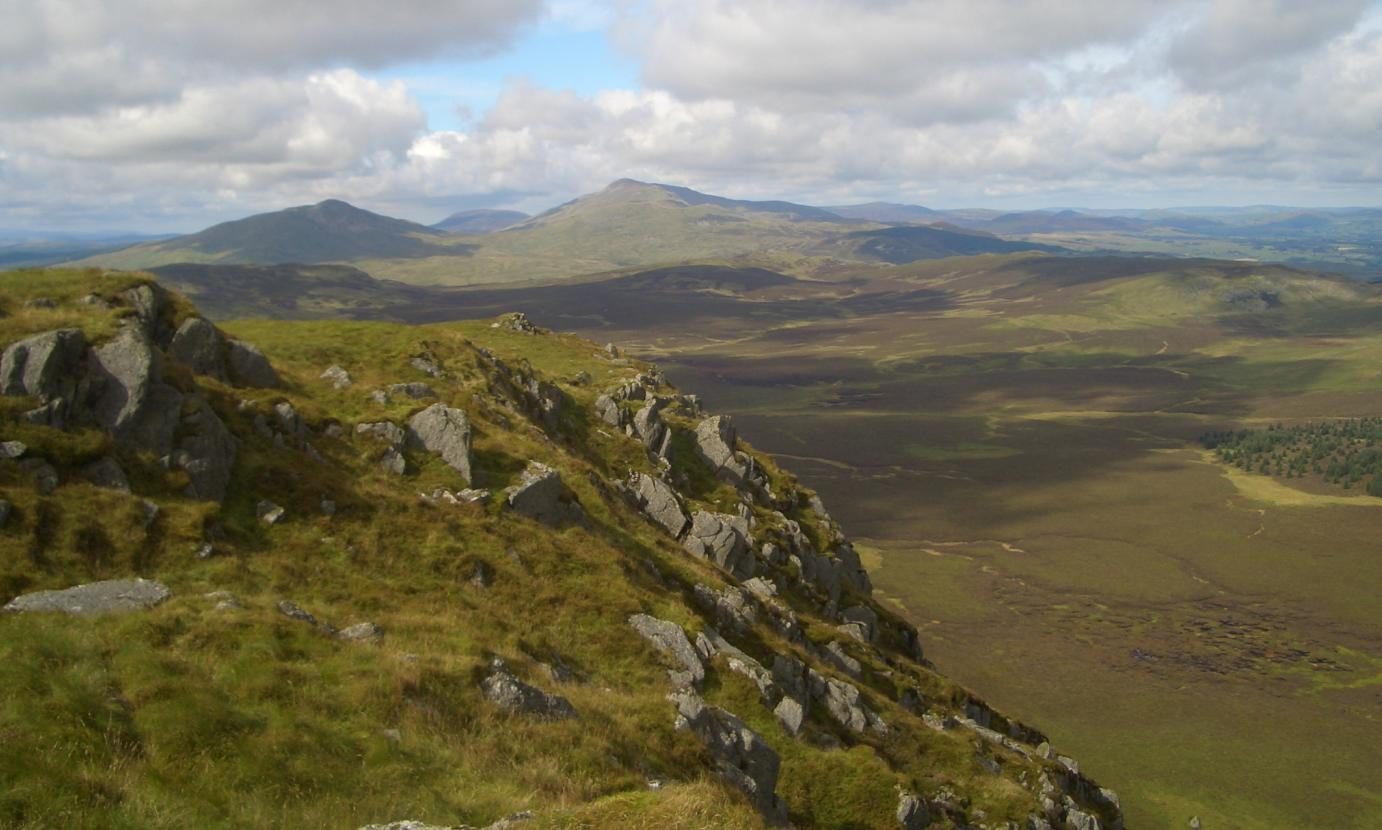
- Arenig Fawr and Moel Llyfnant from Dduallt summit

Highest point
- Elevation: 662 m (2,172 ft)
- Prominence: 138 m (453 ft)
- Parent peak: Rhobell Fawr
- Listing: Hewitt, Nuttall, HuMP
- Coordinates: 52°49′49″N 3°45′57″W

Naming
- English translation: Black hill
- Language of name: Welsh
- Pronunciation: Welsh: [ˈðɨæɬt]

Geography
- Location within Gwynedd
- Location: Gwynedd, Wales
- Parent range: Snowdonia
- OS grid: SH810273

Climbing
- Easiest route: From Rhydymain

Dduallt (English: Black hill; Welsh pronunciation: [ˈðɨ.aɬt]) is a mountain in central Snowdonia, north Wales. It is the sister peak of Rhobell Fawr.

It lies north of the A494 between Dolgellau and Llanuwchllyn. Its eastern slopes are the source of the Afon Dyfrdwy (River Dee).

It is normally climbed from the SW (often with Rhobell Fawr) as there are large boggy areas to the N and E and very steep E face.
