= Llangollen Bridge =

Bridge in Llangollen, north Wales

Coordinates: 52°58′16″N 3°10′13″W

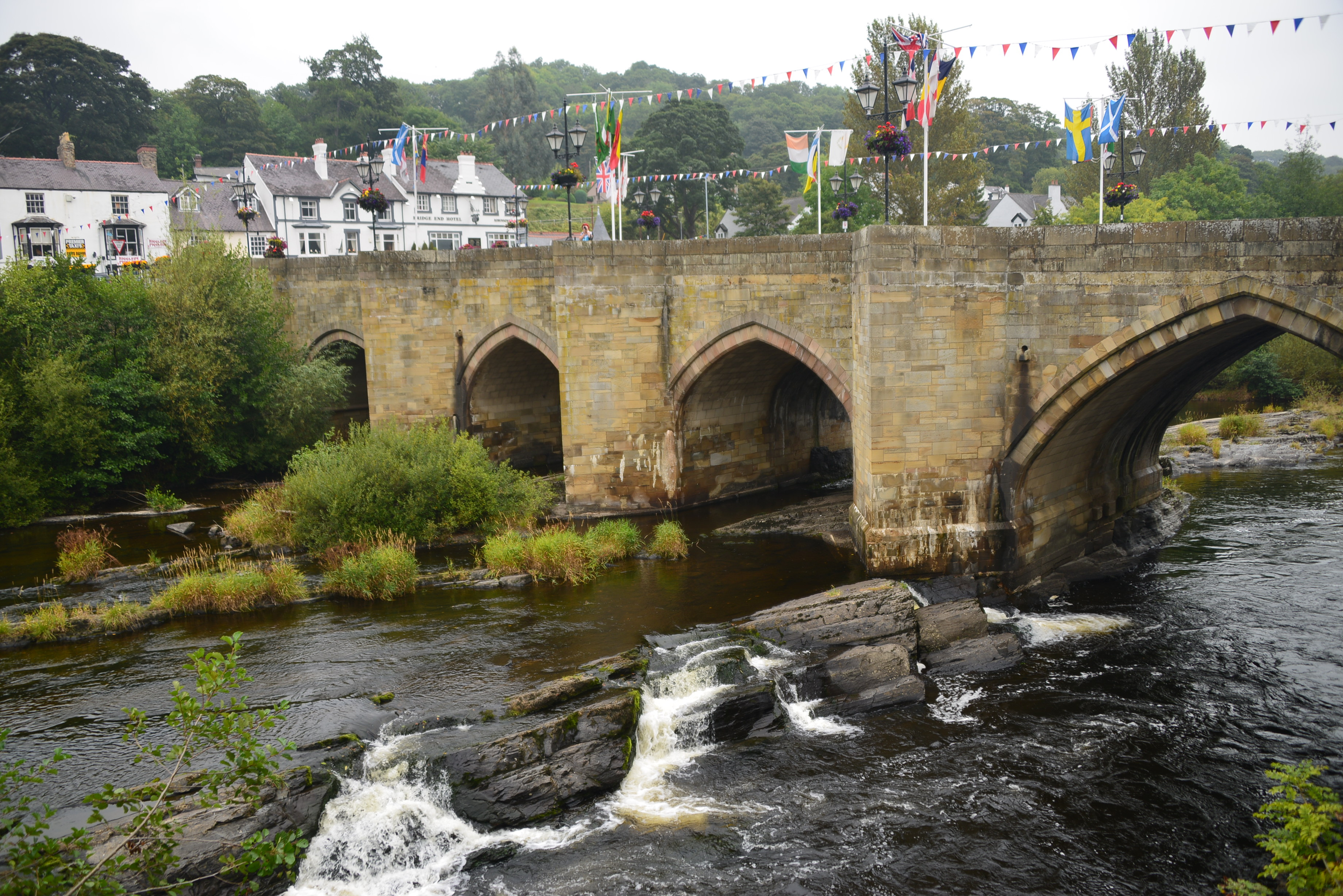
Llangollen Bridge in 2014

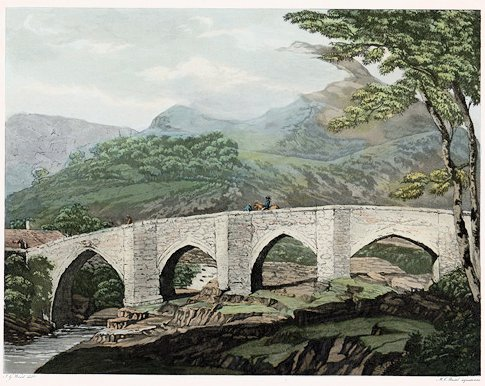
A painting of Llangollen Bridge in 1793

Llangollen Bridge is built across the River Dee at the North end of the high street of Llangollen in the county of Denbighshire in North-east Wales. The Bridge is listed as one of the seven wonders of Wales and is a Grade I listed building.

There has been a bridge across the Dee at Llangollen since at least 1284, though the current bridge appears to date to the 16th or 17th century when an earlier bridge was rebuilt. The current bridge has been enlarged numerous times since then, doubling in width. The bridge is still in use.

The local high school Ysgol Dinas Bran graduating classes have a yearly tradition (oft discouraged) of jumping into the river Dee from the bridge.

== History ==
Traditionally, the establishment of the Llangollen bridge has been attributed to one of the two bishops: John Trefor (bishop 1346–1347) or John Trefor II (bishop 1394–1408), who is said to have had familial connections to Owain Glyndwr. Both men were bishops for the Diocese of St. Asaph, one of the six Welsh Diocese, and resided at the nearby Trefor hall. However, this is unlikely to be the first bridge at the site, as there is evidence of a crossing there as early as 1284, which likely dates to the construction of the Valle-Crucis Abbey. It is equally unlikely that the bridge built by Trefor is the current structure as the tradition suggests. There are generally two alternative dates for the construction of the current bridge: 1540s and 1650s. The argument for the 1540s is based on evidence of sepulchral slabs within the masonry, indicating that it was rebuilt following the dissolution of the monasteries by Henry VIII from 1534 to 1541. The argument for the 1650s is the Rondle Reade stone which details a payment for construction work in 1656, at the site, though whether this refers to rebuilding or repairs is unclear.

The bridge was extended in 1863 to accommodate a new railway line in the area and it was widened a decade later. The bridge nearly doubled in width again in 1968.

== Architecture ==
The river bridge consists of four pointed arches of unequal size, with a further square opening over the railway. Much of the bridge is constructed from coursed rubble, apart from the newer rail section which is made of concrete. The river bridge is flanked by pointed cutwaters, those downstream being the taller.
