= Water Protection Zone =

Regulation in England and Wales, 1991–2009

A Water Protection Zone is a statutory regulation imposed under Schedule 11 of the Water Resources Act 1991. The power was subsequently subsumed into The Water Resources Act (Amendment) (England and Wales) Regulations 2009. The only example in the UK was applied to the River Dee in 1999 as The Water Protection Zone (River Dee Catchment) Designation Order 1999 which covers the whole of the River Dee catchment from the headwaters down to the final potable water abstraction point at Chester.

The creation of this protection zone gave powers to the then Environment Agency (now Natural Resources Wales within Wales) to monitor and control the use and storage of any potentially polluting substance brought into the catchment for any industrial or commercial operation - a controlled activity as defined by the order. All such controlled activities require a permit to be issued and the conditions of the permit are determined by a risk analysis mathematical model involving the nature of the substance, its quantity and the distance from any vulnerable drinking water intake.

Applications for consent are required to complete a formal application

Following a serious degradation of the quality of the River Wye, there have been calls for a new water protection zone to be established for that river.

== See also ==
- Water supply and sanitation in the United Kingdom
  - Water supply and sanitation in England
  - Water supply and sanitation in Northern Ireland
  - Water supply and sanitation in Scotland
  - Water supply and sanitation in Wales
  - Water supply and sanitation in Gibraltar
