= Wrexham and Ellesmere Railway =

Former railway line between Ellesmere, England and Wrexham, Wales

The Wrexham and Ellesmere Railway was a railway line that ran from Wrexham in North Wales, to Ellesmere in Shropshire, England. The line opened in 1895 and closed in 1962, except for a residual goods service which itself closed in 1981.

The line had been conceived as part of a through route to by-pass the dominant Great Western Railway route, but this destiny was never realised, and the line was simply a rural branch. It was worked by the Cambrian Railways effectively as part of that company's system. Wrexham was then the largest town served by the Cambrian Railways.

== The Oswestry, Ellesmere and Whitchurch Railway ==
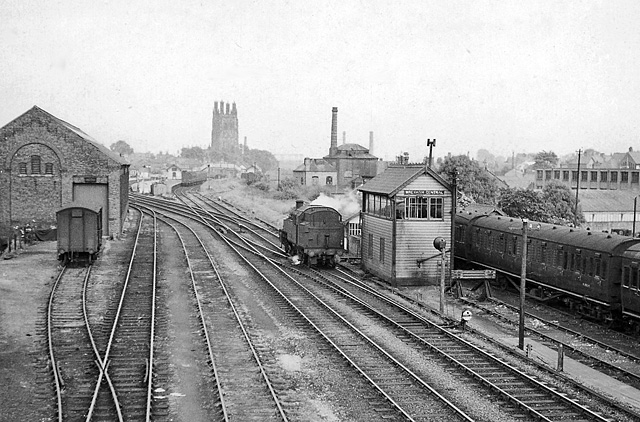
Wrexham Central station in 1959, looking south east

Whitchurch was on the Shrewsbury to Crewe main line of the London and North Western Railway, opened in 1858. Oswestry already had a railway connection, since 1849; it was on a branch line from Gobowen, on the Shrewsbury to Chester main line, at this time part of the Great Western Railway.

The Oswestry, Ellesmere and Whitchurch Railway was authorised to build its line by the passing of the Oswestry, Ellesmere and Whitchurch Railway Act 1861 (24 & 25 Vict. c. ccxxiii) on 1 August 1861, connecting these two competing networks, across largely agricultural terrain. The act required that construction should start from the Whitchurch end; the line opened from Whitchurch to Ellesmere for goods trains on 20 April 1863. It opened throughout on 27 July 1864.

In fact a group of local companies in the area had been in negotiation about merging, and this took effect on 25 July 1864. Accordingly the Oswestry and Newtown Railway, the Newtown and Machynlleth Railway, the Llanidloes and Newtown Railway and the Oswestry, Ellesmere and Whitchurch Railway merged to form the Cambrian Railways.

== Wrexham, Mold and Connah's Quay Railway ==
Minerals extracted in the Wrexham area needed an outlet to points of consumption, and a group of mine owners and others met at the end of 1861 to discuss a new railway that would take the minerals to the River Dee for shipment. The scheme became the Wrexham, Mold and Connah's Quay Railway (WM&CQR), and it opened for goods and mineral traffic on 1 January 1866 from Wrexham to Buckley, where it joined the Buckley Railway. Passenger operation was delayed until 1 May 1866, by which time improvements had been put in place. In 1864 the WM&CQR gained authority in the Wrexham, Mold and Connah's Quay Railway (Extension) Act 1864 (27 & 28 Vict. c. ccxxxiv) to make a branch from Wrexham to Whitchurch, but this was not proceeded with due to the inability to raise the capital necessary.

== Wrexham and Ellesmere Railway ==
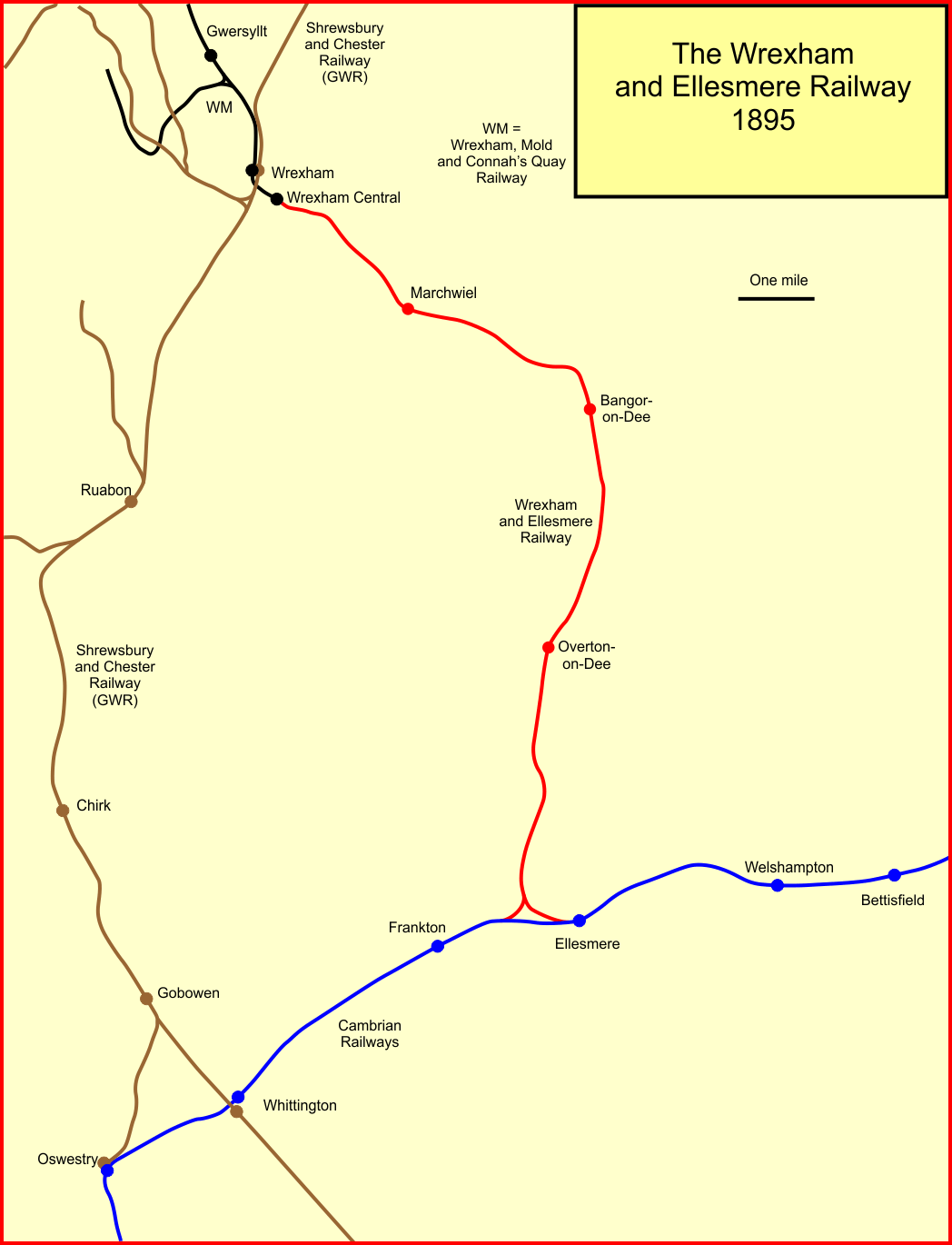
The Wrexham and Ellesmere Railway in 1895

Wrexham was a centre of mineral extraction, and the London and North Western Railway (LNWR) was steadily developing interests in the district. A connection between Ellesmere and Wrexham would be a useful link in a chain of lines serving that purpose. The Manchester, Sheffield and Lincolnshire Railway had an interest in the development also, and was prepared to collaborate with the LNWR in encouraging a local scheme.

Wrexham and Ellesmere Railway Act 1885
- Act of Parliament
- Parliament of the United Kingdom
- Long title: An Act for making a Railway from Wrexham in the county of Denbigh to Ellesmere in the county of Salop; and for other purposes.
- Citation: 48 & 49 Vict. c. cl

Dates
- Royal assent: 31 July 1885

Text of statute as originally enacted

The Wrexham and Ellesmere Railway was incorporated by an act of Parliament, the Wrexham and Ellesmere Railway Act 1885 (48 & 49 Vict. c. cl), on 31 July 1885, sponsored chiefly by Benjamin Piercy, who had become a promoter of railways, in collaboration with Henry Robertson MP. The capital was £180,000. However the economy suffered a serious trade depression at this time, and it proved impossible to raise the needed money. Worse was to follow in February 1888, when both Piercy and Robertson died.

== Wrexham Central station ==
The Wrexham, Mold and Connah's Quay Railway (WM&CQR) line ran into Wrexham from the north, and lay immediately to the west of the GWR line. The WM&CQR station ("Wrexham Exchange") and the Great Western Railway (GWR) station ("Wrexham General") were correspondingly alongside one another, both on the western margin of the town. The WM&CQR built an extension line with a new Wrexham Central station; the short branch passed under the GWR line and ran east. It opened on 1 November 1887, and double track was installed on 1 September 1888. The branch may have been to facilitate the expected Ellesmere line, or it may have been to ensure retention of the Wrexham traffic for itself in the event the passengers deserted the Exchange station in favour of the more convenient Central station.

Christiansen & Miller (1968) sees the sequence differently:

The object of the WM&CQ'S extension to Wrexham Central became apparent towards the end of 1884 with the announcement of plans for building a new line from Wrexham... to Ellesmere. The Wrexham & Ellesmere Railway was duly incorporated on 31 July 1885. The Manchester, Sheffield & Lincolnshire chairman, Sir Edward Watkin, saw the branch as a spearhead for a drive into Wales. He suggested that the GWR should finance it jointly with the Cambrian, WM&CQ and his own company, but with its position in Wrexham strategically secure the GWR declined. The MS&LR then paid £50,000 towards the £180,000 needed, with the Cambrian and WM&CQ as the other main subscribers. With this capital and £50,000 [permitted] in loans the Wrexham & Ellesmere was incorporated.

Wrexham and Ellesmere Railway Act 1888
- Act of Parliament
- Parliament of the United Kingdom
- Long title: An Act to extend the time for the purchase of Lands and for the completion of the Wrexham and Ellesmere Railway; and for other purposes.
- Citation: 51 & 52 Vict. c. cxcvii

Dates
- Royal assent: 10 August 1888

Text of statute as originally enacted

Wrexham and Ellesmere Railway (Extension of Time) Act 1890
- Act of Parliament
- Parliament of the United Kingdom
- Long title: An Act to extend the time for the purchase of Lands for and for the completion of the Wrexham and Ellesmere Railway and for other purposes.
- Citation: 53 & 54 Vict. c. xxv

Dates
- Royal assent: 22 May 1890

Wrexham and Ellesmere Railway Act 1895
- Act of Parliament
- Parliament of the United Kingdom
- Long title: An Act to confer further powers upon the Wrexham and Ellesmere Railway Company and for other purposes.
- Citation: 58 & 59 Vict. c. xvii

Dates
- Royal assent: 14 May 1895

Text of statute as originally enacted

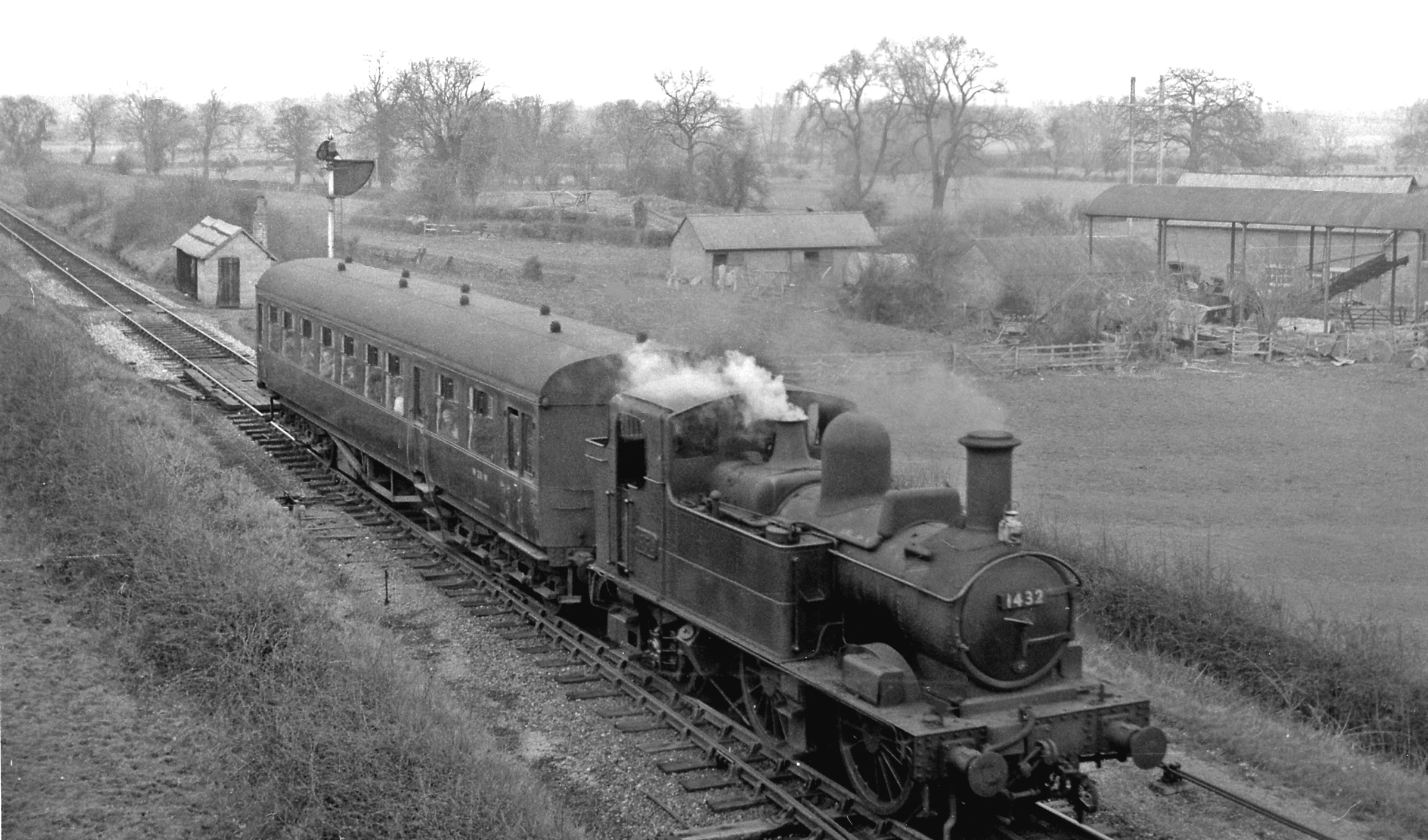
A train at Bangor-on-Dee

Having obtained authorisation for the line in 1885, the proprietors of the Wrexham and Ellesmere Railway had to apply to Parliament for an extension of the time allowed for construction; this was secured in 1888 with the Wrexham and Ellesmere Railway Act 1888 (51 & 52 Vict. c. cxcvii) giving an extension to July 1893, and again in 1890 with the Wrexham and Ellesmere Railway (Extension of Time) Act 1890 (53 & 54 Vict. c. xxv), when an extension to July 1895 was obtained. As the possible South Wales trunk route idea firmed up, the company also obtained powers, via the Wrexham and Ellesmere Railway Act 1895 (58 & 59 Vict. c. xvii) on 14 May 1895, for a west-to-north curve at Ellesmere, that would allow through running there. In this period the company chairman and many of the directors were also officers or directors of the Manchester, Sheffield and Lincolnshire Railway or the WM&CQR, or the Cambrian Railways.

== Construction and opening ==
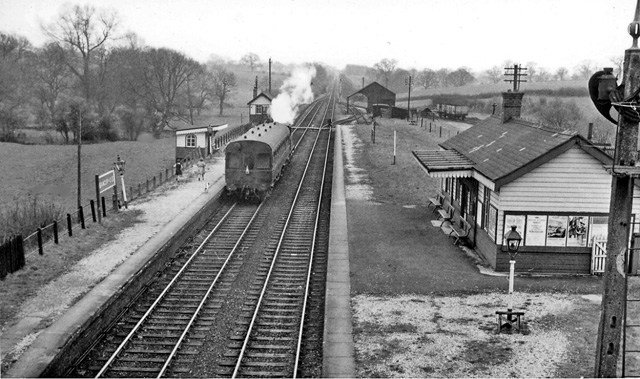
Bangor-on-Dee station

The necessary finance was eventually arranged, and on 11 July 1892 the first sod of the Wrexham and Ellesmere Railway was turned. Although only 12 miles (19 km) in extent, the line took three years in the building; there was a considerable extent of demolition of dwellings in Wrexham to make way for the line, as the Central station terminus was converted to a through station. The route included a 58m single span crossing of the River Dee; delivery of the girders was delayed, putting back the opening of the line. Although the line was single, overbridges were built for double track. A special excursion was run from Wrexham to Ellesmere on 2 July 1895, considerably in advance of obtaining the Board of Trade inspector’s approval for passenger operation.

The line opened for ordinary passenger traffic on 2 November 1895. There were stations at Marchwiel, Bangor-on-Dee and Overton-on-Dee; the line was single throughout with passing loops at the stations; the triangular junction at Ellesmere was operational from the start. The line was worked by the Cambrian Railways. There were five or six passenger services in each direction in the early years. In summer a through train ran from Chester to Aberystwyth, using the west curve at Ellesmere.

Nevertheless, the line never developed a role as a through trunk route; it and the other lines necessary for a trunk journey were predominantly single track and slow, and the sponsoring railway companies were unwilling to expend the considerable sums that would have been necessary to realise that ambition. Accordingly the line remained of local transport significance, with Wrexham forming the hub for local commerce.

Additional halts were opened at Sesswick and Trench in 1913 and 1914.

== The west loop at Ellesmere ==
The Ellesmere loop allowing direct running towards Oswestry was not in fact much used. It fell into disuse by 1903; it was reopened in 1905 but again closed later. It may have seen its main existence after 1911; Christiansen & Miller (1968) say

To improve the flow of through traffic a triangular junction was laid at Ellesmere in 1911 and the Wrexham-Oswestry curve was double-tracked as an extra crossing loop. As the union concept (Note: Supported by the Welsh Railways Through Traffic Act 1889 (52 & 53 Vict. c. cxxxv), the Union of railways was intended to enable and promote collaboration for through working of mineral trains from South Wales northward.) stagnated the curve fell out of use, and it was lifted in 1921 when it became clear that the through traffic which had been diverted via Whitchurch and Crewe as a wartime measure [during World War I] would never return.

== Auto trains ==
The introduction of pull-and-push operation for local passenger services in 1913 was associated with new halts at Sesswick (October 1913) and Trench (December 1914).

== Financial performance ==
The Wrexham and Ellesmere Railway was little used by passengers, serving a sparsely inhabited area. However the routing of through mineral trains brought a steady income and in 1913, the last year of independence, gross receipts totalled £10,836; the company paid 3 per cent dividends in the nine years to grouping. However the income was a small fraction of what had been forecast before construction.

== Grouping of the railways, and later ==
In 1923 the main line railways of Great Britain were grouped, pursuant to the Railways Act 1921. Four new railway companies were established, and the Cambrian Railways and the pre-existing Great Western Railway were constituents of the new Great Western Railway. As it was effectively part of the Cambrian Railways the Wrexham and Ellesmere Railway passed into Great Western Railway ownership. In due course the line was classified as Dotted Blue for route availability purposes.

The new owners spent some money on improving the line, introducing the Electric Train Tablet system of signalling the single line, in place of the former Train Staff and Ticket system. A new halt was opened at Hightown, near Wrexham, and later at Cloy, Elson and Pickhill. However the passenger operation on the line was plainly loss-making, and the GWR eliminated the staffing at the intermediate stations, which became unstaffed halts. The motor-trolley system of track maintenance was introduced.

The Wrexham end of the line was at the old Wrexham, Mold and Connah's Quay terminus, now converted to a through station.

Notwithstanding the sponsoring companies' objective, of by-passing the GWR route, it was not until 1895 that a west-to-north spur at Ellesmere was authorised in Parliament. In fact it was not much used, and was soon closed, reopening in 1905. The lengthy and awkward route for heavy coal shipments from South Wales discouraged the LNWR from developing the traffic on this axis. There was some through passenger traffic from the Great Central Railway (as the MS&LR had become) system to Aberystwyth, but local traffic was small and the line's income was correspondingly limited.

== World War II ==
The year 1939 marked the beginning of World War II. At first passenger services on the line were reduced, but after an interval they were restored.

An ordnance depot was opened at Marchwiel; it was titled ROF Wrexham, and its railway connection and branch line consisted of about nine miles of siding track. Moreover several other locations on the line were brought into army support use. So intensive was the goods traffic in this connection that the suspension of the passenger service on the line was ordered; this took place from 10 June 1940.

== After the war ==
Following the cessation of hostilities, the passenger service was restored on 6 May 1946. A service of eight trains each way every weekday was put on, operated by auto-trains.

The transfer of passengers and goods transport to road vehicles had been experienced in the 1930s and now accelerated, so that the decline in use of the railway line was steep. Losses mounted and in 1960 it was announced that the line would be closed, excepting only a residual goods service from Wrexham to Cadbury's Creamery at Pickhill. The closure duly took place on 10 September 1962. The residual goods activity itself declined, and the line closed completely in May 1981.

== Location list ==
- Ellesmere; Cambrian Railways station; closed 18 January 1965.
- Cambrian Junction; divergence from the line to Oswestry.
- Ellesmere North Junction; convergence of the Ellesmere loop; called Wrexham Junction South Loop, according to Christiansen.
- Elson Halt; opened 8 February 1937.
- Trench Halt; opened November 1914.
- Overton-on-Dee; opened 2 November 1895.
- Cloy Halt; opened as Caedyah Halt 30 June 1932; renaming date early, but uncertain.
- Bangor-on-Dee; opened 2 November 1895.
- Pickhill Halt; opened 30 May 1938.
- Sesswick Halt; opened October 1913.
- Marchwiel Royal Ordnance Factory Sidings.
- Marchwiel; opened 2 November 1895.
- Hightown Halt; opened 9 July 1923.
- Wrexham Central; Great Central Railway (WM&CQR) station; still open.

== Topography ==
The line descended from each end to a low point near Bangor-on-Dee. Climbing away from that location in either direction involved gradients of 1 in 86 northwards and 1 in 81 southward, and a more or less continuous steep climb each way.

== Royal Ordnance Factory, Wrexham ==
In the build-up to World War II, a number of shadow factories were built in preparation, located in the Northwest of the British Isles to be out of range of the Luftwaffe.

The Royal Ordnance Factory relocated a number of workers to various sites, and built a number of new factories, including ROF Wrexham. The site employed 13,000 workers, making cordite, an explosive propellent for shells. Spread out over a large site to minimise any potential explosive or bombing damage, the main buildings were camouflaged and existing farm buildings were left in situ to help protect the site against reconnaissance. The Ministry of Works built a large water abstraction and treatment plant at Sesswick on the River Dee, just to supply the plant, which was amalgamated into the Wrexham Water Company (now Dee Valley Water) in 1951.
