= Llangower railway station =

Railway station in Gwynedd, Wales

Llangower
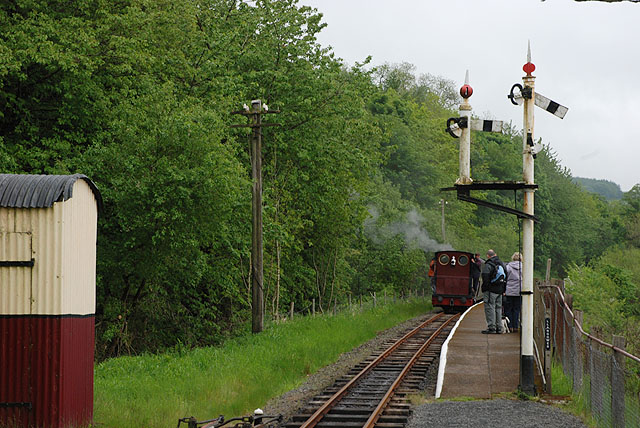
- A train arriving into the station

General information
- Location: Llangower, Gwynedd; Wales
- Coordinates: 52.875183°N 3.632196°W
- Grid reference: SH902321
- System: Station on heritage railway
- Manager: Bala Lake Railway
- Platforms: 1

Key dates
- 10 Jun 1929: Opened
- 18 Jan 1965: Closed
- 15 Sept 1972: Reopened by Bala Lake Railway
Location

Llangower was a minor station opened by the GWR on the Ruabon to Barmouth line in 1929 on the southern shore of Llyn Tegid (Bala Lake) serving the hamlet of Llangower.

There was no signal box or freight facility, just a short platform and a waiting shelter on the south side of the line. Today, although not in its original location the station has been reopened 350m to the west (on the north side of the line) by the Bala Lake Railway and is the main intermediate point on the line and the only place where trains can pass each other. It is well sited to provide access to the lakeside for walks, picnics and bird watching.

The station has a single platform, with the passing loop located to the east of the platform. When two trains are in service, they must use the station in turn, with the second train remaining in the loop until called forward after the first train has departed. The points and signals at the station are operated from a ground frame, housed in a ground frame shelter.

In the spring of 2017 and thanks to a significant donation collected in memory of “Pip, The Railway Dog” - faithful companion to a volunteer and supporter of the railway, the station received refurbishment with a new picket fence and running in board.

Llangower is a small hamlet, with a beautiful old church, 3 miles from Bala situated on the south-eastern side of Llyn Tegid. It is on the (original) turnpike-road leading from Dinas-Mawddwy to Bala and Corwen.

== Neighbouring stations ==
Preceding station	Heritage railways	Following station
Pentrepiod Halt towards Llanuwchllyn	Bala Lake Railway	Bala (Penybont) Terminus
Disused railways
Pentrepiod Halt towards Llanuwchllyn	Bala Lake Railway until 2011	Bryn Hynod Halt towards Bala (Penybont)
Glan Llyn Halt	Great Western Railway; Ruabon Barmouth Line	Bala Lake Halt
