= Dinorwic Alice Class =

Hunslet Alice Class
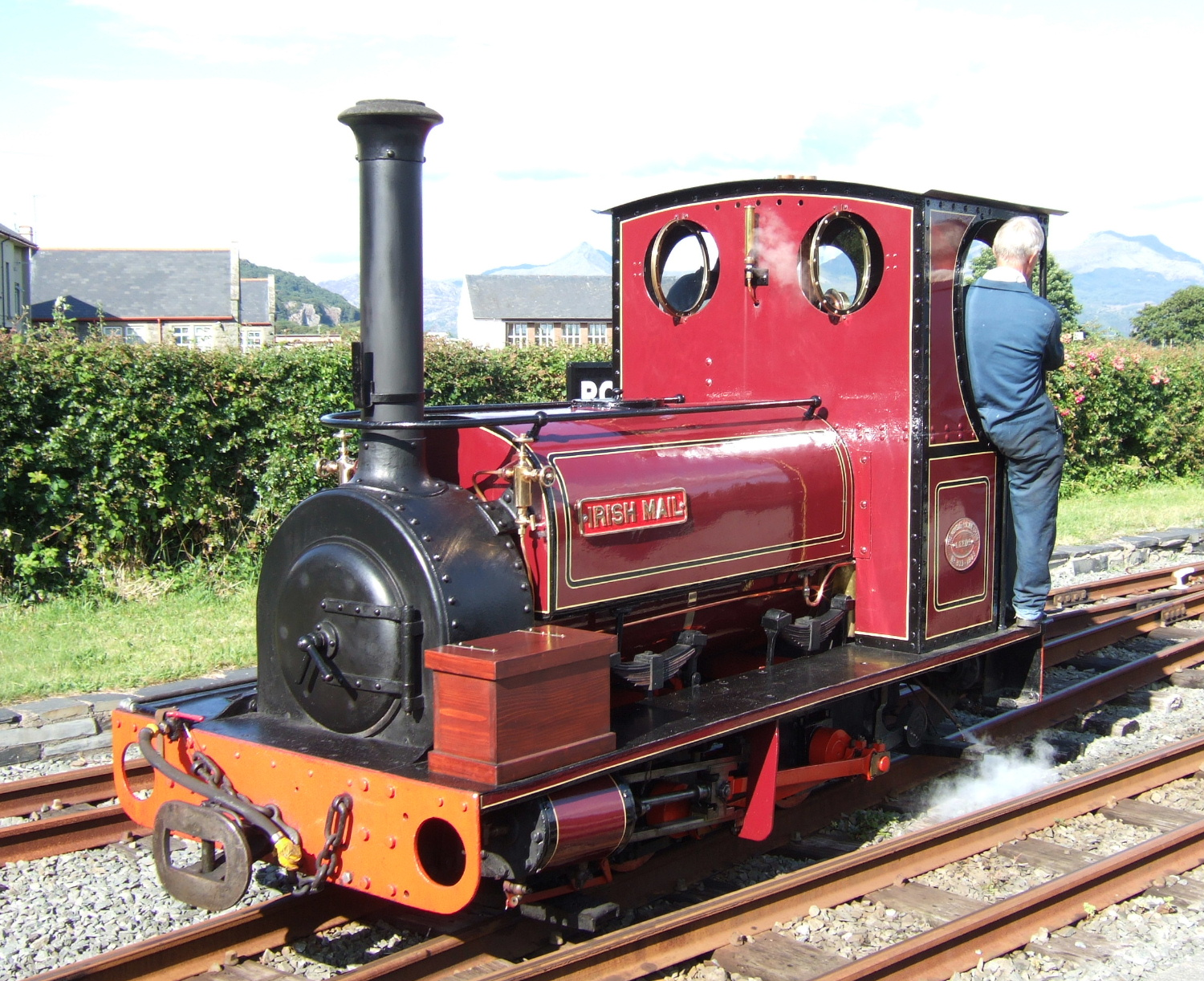
- Irish Mail on the Welsh Highland Heritage Railway, August 2005
Type and origin
- Power type: Steam
- Builder: Hunslet Engine Company
- Build date: 1886–1904
- Total produced: 11
Specifications
- Configuration
  - Whyte: 0-4-0ST
  - UIC: B n2t
- Gauge: 1 ft 10 3/4 in (578 mm)
- Driver dia.: 1 ft 8 in (508 mm)
- Fuel type: Coal
- Water cap.: 100 imp gal (450 L; 120 US gal)
- Boiler pressure: 140 lbf/in^{2} (970 kPa)
- Cylinders: Two
Career
- Operators: Dinorwic Slate Quarry
- Withdrawn: 1957–1967
- Disposition: All preserved

The Dinorwic Alice Class is a class of eleven narrow-gauge 0-4-0ST steam locomotives built specifically for the Dinorwic quarry, Gwynedd. These locomotives were built by the Hunslet Engine Company between 1886 and 1904, and were designed and supplied specifically to work the many galleries of the quarry at Llanberis, North Wales.

== History ==
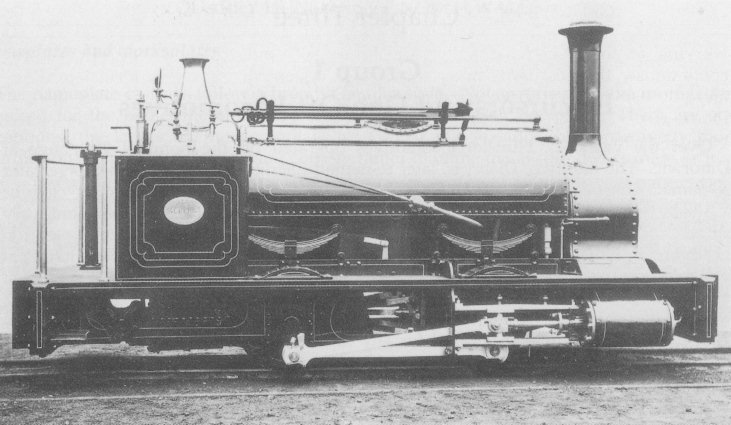
Official photograph of Dinorwic, the forerunner of the Alice class

After earlier experiences with vertical boilered De Winton locomotives, the quarry company decided they needed more powerful locomotives to run on heavier, double-headed rail in chaired track on its more intensively worked quarry galleries. To improve transport of cut slate to the mills and waste to the slag tips, a standard locomotive design that was powerful, lightweight and had a short wheelbase was required.

In 1870, the quarry placed an order with the Hunslet Engine Company of Leeds for a prototype locomotive. They produced Dinorwic (works number 51 of 1870), which is a clear precursor to the Alice class. This locomotive proved a success and two further locomotives were ordered in 1877 to an improved design.

Hunslet continued to evolve the design, and when the quarry ordered a fourth locomotive in 1886, Hunslet delivered the first of the Alice Class engines, named Velinheli (No. 409 of 1886). The class name was derived from the second example of this class of engine to be built, named Alice later King Of The Scarlets (No. 492 of 1889). This was done to avoid confusion with the Port organisation (Port Dinorwic or Y Felinheli) which was separate from the quarry operation.

11 locomotives of this class were built for the Dinorwic Slate Quarry, with all surviving into some form of preservation. Hunslet allocated the telegraphic codename VELIN to this class, named after the first locomotive.

== Locomotive information ==
First name / No.	Second name	Year built	Works number	Working location at Dinorwic (Gallery name or Port)	Image	Disposal	Current location
Velinheli	~	1886	409	Ponc-Fawr 1928; Dyffryn 1935; Gilfach Ddu 1950; Village Line 1952; Hafod Owen 1959; Gilfach Ddu 1962		Sold May 1965	Ffestiniog Railway
Alice	King Of The Scarlets	1889	492	Dyffryn 1947; Gilfach Ddu 1965		Sold June 1965	Statfold Barn Railway
Enid	Red Damsel / Elidir	1889	493	New York, Gilfach Ddu 1931; Lernion 1950; Gilfach Ddu 1957		Dismantled, parts sold 1969	Llanberis Lake Railway
No.1	Rough Pup	1891	541	Dyffryn, Pen Garret, Gilfach Ddu 1960		Moved To NGRM, 1968	Narrow Gauge Railway Museum at Tywyn
No.2	Cloister	1892	542	New York 1932; Gilfach Ddu 1933; Dyffryn 1934; Ponc-Fawr, Gilfach Ddu 1961		Sold August 1962	Statfold Barn Railway
Wellington	George B	1898	680	The Port 1898; Dyffryn 1929; Gilfach Ddu 1935		Sold October 1965	Bala Lake Railway
No.3	Holy War	1902	779	Lernion, Penrhydd-Bach, Gilfach Ddu 1969		Sold November 1969	Bala Lake Railway
No.4	Alice	1902	780	Australia		Sold January 1969	Bala Lake Railway
No.5	Maid Marian	1903	822	Village Line 1903; Gilfach Ddu 1931; Padarn-Peris Tram Line 1956; Pen-Garret, Gilfach Ddu 1966		Sold 1965	Bala Lake Railway
No.6	Irish Mail	1903	823	Pen-Garret 1903; Sinc-Fawr 1929; Australia 1936; Gilfach Ddu 1959		Motion parts sold 1969	West Lancashire Light Railway
No.7	Wild Aster / Thomas Bach	1904	849	Pen-Garret 1904; Gilfach Ddu 1934; Ponc-Fawr 1935; Penrhydd-Bach 1950; Gilfach Ddu 1962		Dismantled, parts sold 1969	Llanberis Lake Railway

== Bibliography ==
- Boyd, James I.C. (1986). Narrow Gauge Railways in North Caernarvonshire, Volume Three: The Dinorwic Quarry and Railways, The Great Orme Tramway and Other Rail Systems. Oakwood Press. ISBN 0-85361-328-1.

== See also ==
- British narrow-gauge railways
- List of preserved Hunslet narrow-gauge locomotives
