= Bont Newydd railway station =

Disused railway station in Gwynedd, Wales

Coordinates: 52.76464°N 3.82390°W

Bont Newydd
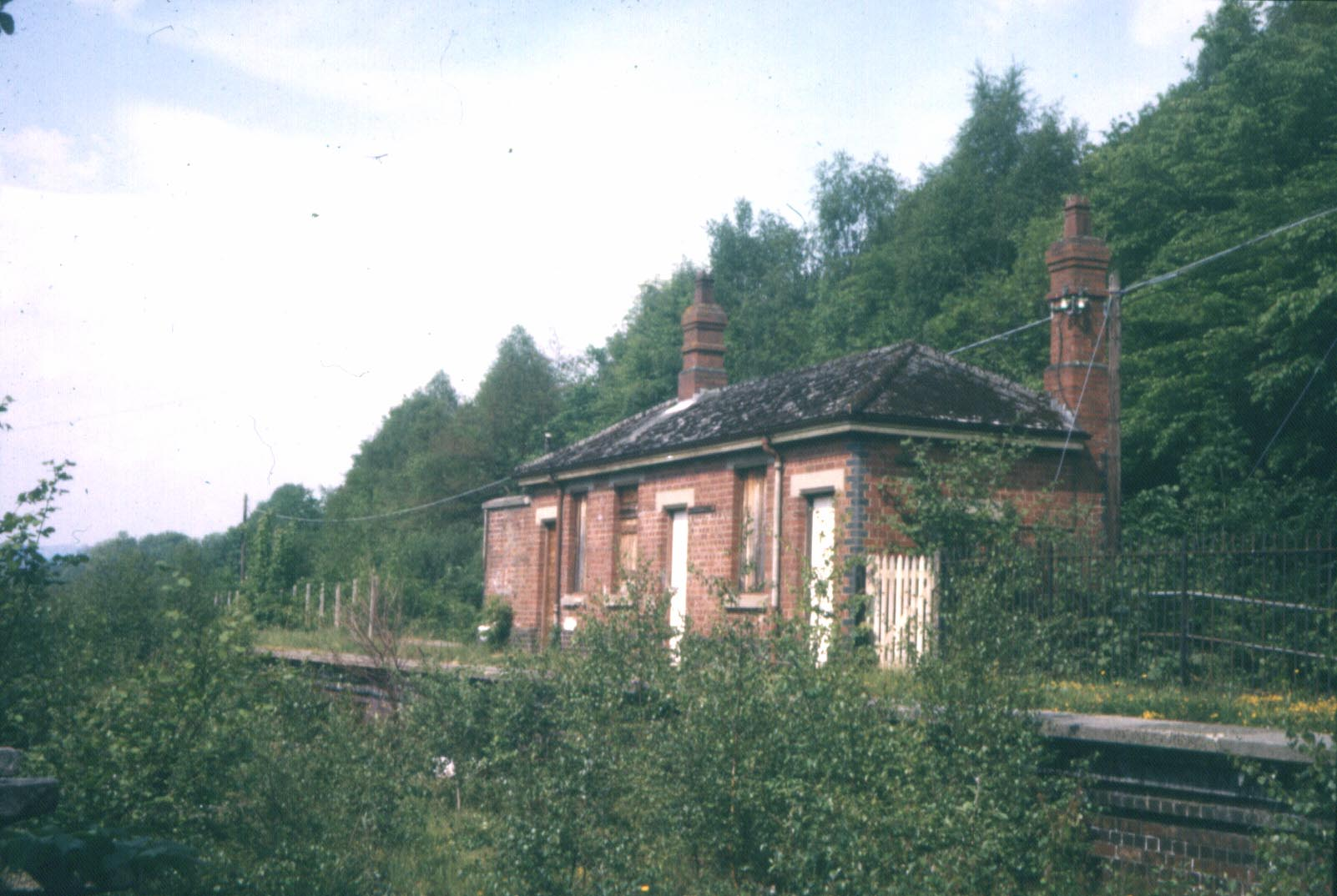
- Bont Newydd Station in May 1975, ten years after closure.

General information
- Location: Bont Newydd, Gwynedd; Wales
- Platforms: 2

Other information
- Status: Disused

History
- Original company: Bala and Dolgelly Railway
- Pre-grouping: Great Western Railway
- Post-grouping: Great Western Railway

Key dates
- 4 August 1868: Opened
- 18 January 1965: Closed to passengers
- 4 May 1964: Closed to goods
Location

Bont Newydd railway station (sometimes shown as Bontnewydd) in Gwynedd, Wales, was a station on the now-closed Ruabon to Barmouth line.

Originally a single-line station, a crossing loop was installed in 1923 and a second platform constructed out of old sleepers. A corrugated iron shelter was provided on the Down platform. The main station building was on the Up platform and contained a booking office, a general waiting room, a ladies' room and a Gents' WC.

There was a siding on the up side capable of holding fifteen wagons. A signal box controlled the single-line sections to Dolgellau in one direction and Drws-y-Nant in the other. The box also controlled the adjacent level crossing. Today, the brick platform remains. The station-master's house across the road remains and is still occupied.

According to the Official Handbook of Stations the following classes of traffic were being handled at this station in 1956: G & P and there was no crane.

== Neighbouring stations ==
Preceding station	Disused railways	Following station
Dolserau Halt; Line and station closed	Great Western Railway; Bala and Dolgelly Railway	Wnion Halt; Line and station closed
