= Dolserau Halt railway station =

Disused railway station in Gwynedd, Wales

Coordinates: 52.7595°N 3.8467°W

Dolserau Halt
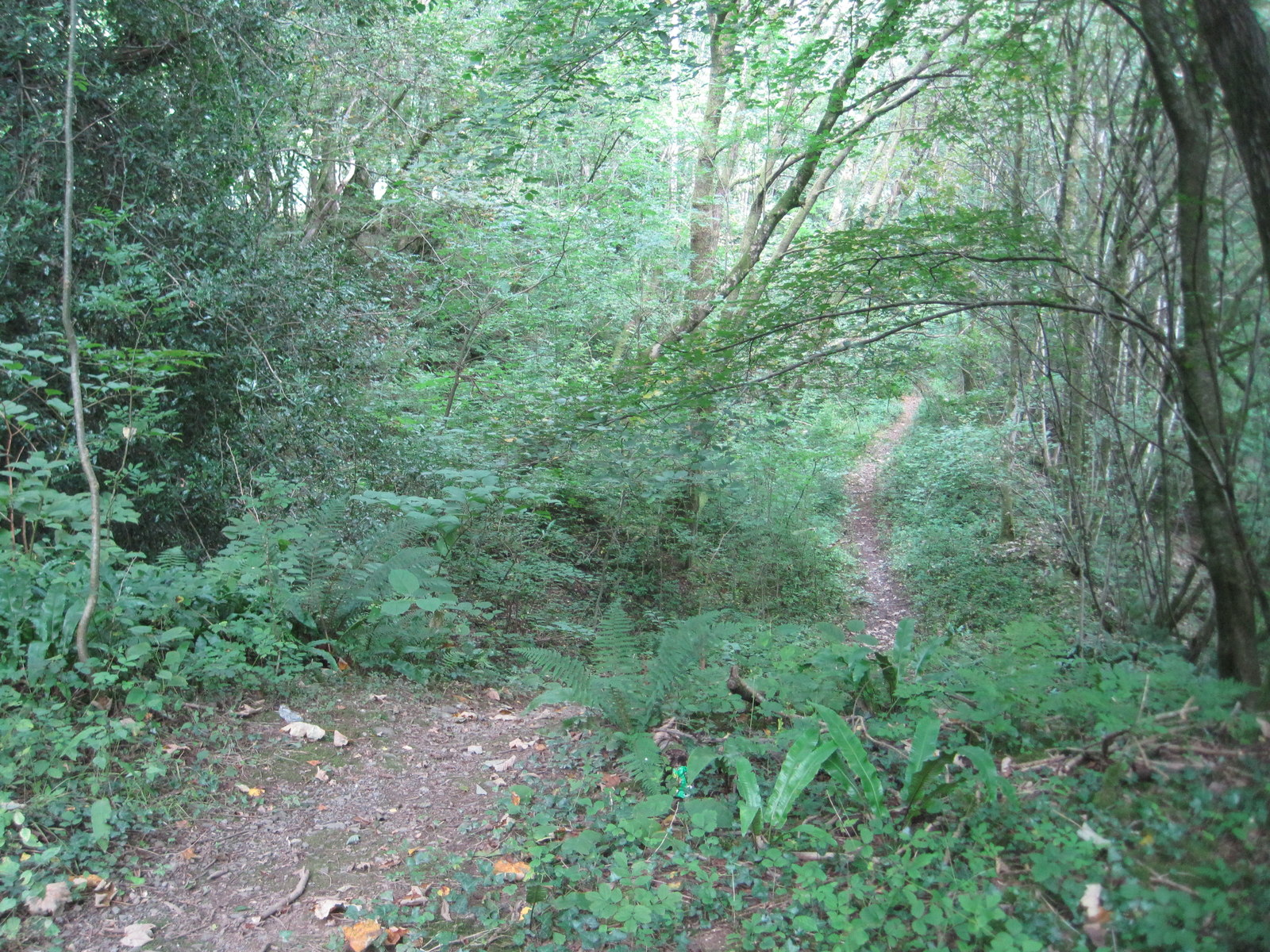
- The site of the station in 2015

General information
- Location: Dolserau, Gwynedd; Wales
- Platforms: 1

Other information
- Status: Disused

History
- Post-grouping: Great Western Railway

Key dates
- 8 Feb 1935: Opened
- 29 Oct 1951: Closed
Location

Dolserau Halt (Pron: Dol-seh-rye) in Gwynedd, Wales, was on the Ruabon to Barmouth line. The platform edge was made of timber and was situated on the north side of the line. It had a timber shelter and a name-board with the suffix "FOR THE TORRENT WALK" (a popular trail through Afon Clywedog gorge on the other side of the valley). There was no passing place or freight activity here.

The halt has been demolished.

== Neighbouring stations ==
Preceding station	Disused railways	Following station
Dolgellau; Line and station closed	Great Western Railway; Bala and Dolgelly Railway	Bont Newydd; Line and station closed
