= Llys Halt railway station =

Disused railway station in Gwynedd, Wales

Coordinates: 52.8430°N 3.6935°W

Llys Halt

General information
- Location: Rhosdylluan, Gwynedd; Wales
- Platforms: 1

Other information
- Status: Disused

History
- Post-grouping: Great Western Railway

Key dates
- 4 Jun 1934: Opened
- 18 Jan 1965: Closed
Location

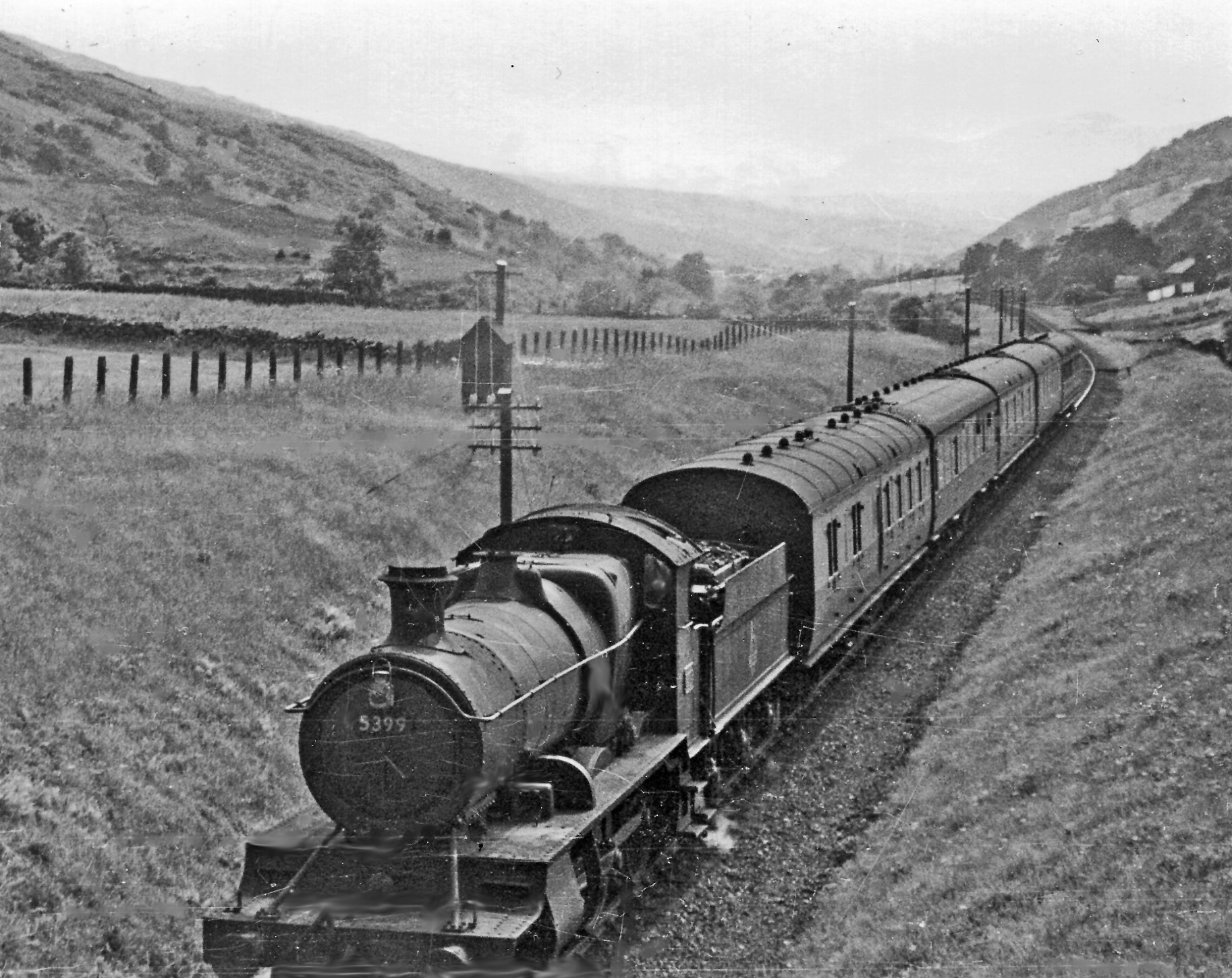
Up stopping train near Llys Halt in 1951

Llys Halt in Gwynedd, Wales, was on the Ruabon to Barmouth line. There was no passing place or freight activity here.

There was a single platform on the south-east side, provided with an open-front shelter, and a single nameboard reading "Llys Halt". Approximately 55 yards (50 m) to the south-east was Llys Crossing, which was gated and staffed; this was provided with a crossing keepers house. In addition to the main gates for road vehicles, there were swing wickets for pedestrians. The crossing was controlled from Llanuwchllyn. Today a garden hedgerow covers the site of the platform.

== Neighbouring stations ==
Preceding station	Disused railways	Following station
Garneddwen Halt; Line and station closed	Great Western Railway; Bala and Dolgelly Railway	Llanuwchllyn; Line and station closed
