= Bryn Hynod Halt railway station =

Disused railway station in Gwynedd, Wales

Coordinates: 52.878784°N 3.628542°W

Bryn Hynod railway station was a railway halt on the Bala Lake Railway, in Gwynedd, Wales. Trains stopped here by request.

Adjacent to Llyn Tegid (Bala Lake) itself, Bryn Hynod offers shaded woodland nooks that are ideal for picnics and is often used for launching sailboards and small boats. There is off-road parking by the lakeside for those using the area's facilities, and the halt provided an opportunity to use the railway from this location on the B4403.

The halt consisted of a very short platform (quite possibly the smallest in Britain) and a name sign and was situated on the west side of an occupation crossing. Few passengers made use of the halt, and it was removed from the timetable in 2011. Bryn Hynod platform was demolished in February 2012, and the station name removed. There is no remaining part of the station at the site.

Preceding station	Heritage railways	Following station
Disused railways
Llangower towards Llanuwchllyn	Bala Lake Railway until 2011	Bala (Penybont) Terminus
