= Wnion Halt railway station =

Disused railway station in Gwynedd, Wales

Coordinates: 52.7725°N 3.7875°W

Wnion Halt
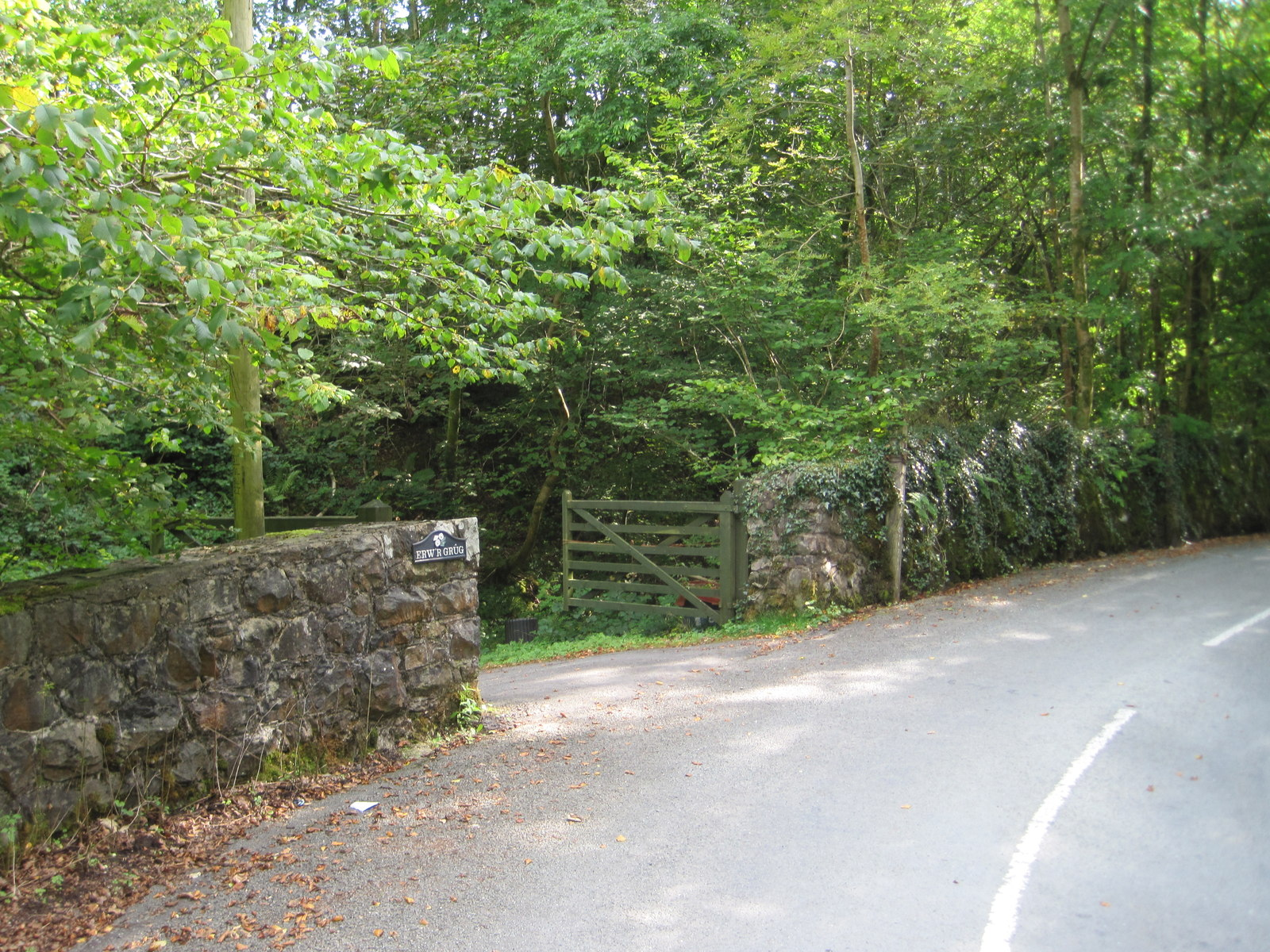
- The site of the station entrance in 2015

General information
- Location: Pont Llanrhaiadr, Gwynedd; Wales
- Platforms: 1

Other information
- Status: Disused

History
- Post-grouping: Great Western Railway

Key dates
- 5 Jun 1933: Opened
- 18 Jan 1965: Closed
Location

Wnion Halt (Pron: Oon-y'n) in Gwynedd, Wales, was on the Ruabon to Barmouth line. The station, which was situated in a narrow part of the Wnion Valley, is next to Pont Llanrhaiadr. It was sited on the north side of the line against a road's retaining wall. The halt consisted of a short timber-edged platform with a wooden shelter and nameboard. It had no passing loop or freight activity. Only rusted platform supports remain. The halt's entrance gate is now part of a driveway to a private residence.

== Neighbouring stations ==
Preceding station	Disused railways	Following station
Bont Newydd; Line and station closed	Great Western Railway; Bala and Dolgelly Railway	Drws-y-Nant; Line and station closed
