= West Lancashire Light Railway =

Narrow gauge railway in Lancashire, England

Coordinates: 53.7003°N 2.8387°W

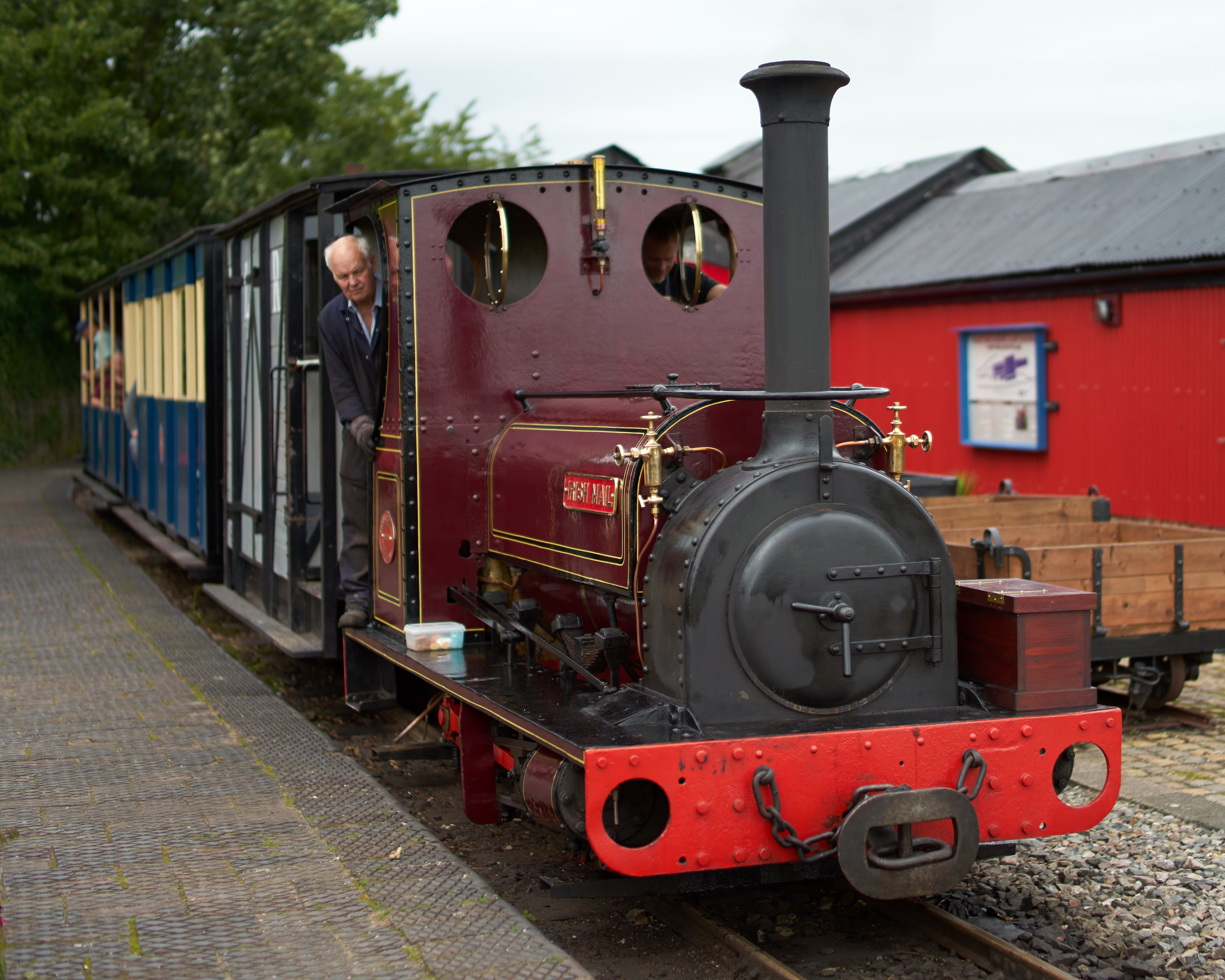
- Irish Mail

Overview
- Headquarters: Hesketh Bank
- Locale: England
- Dates of operation: 1967–present

Technical
- Track gauge: 2 ft (610 mm)
- Length: 430 yards (393 m)

Other
- Website: www.westlancsrailway.org

The West Lancashire Light Railway (WLLR) is a 2 ft (610 mm) narrow gauge railway that operates at Hesketh Bank, situated between Preston and Southport in North West England. The distance between the stations on the railway is 430 yards (393 m), though track extends eastwards beyond Delph station on ledge above the old clay pit which is too narrow to contain a run round loop. An extension of up to 435 metres (1,427 ft), running along the north bank of the fishing lake has been proposed. The railway has Four steam locomotives, two of which are in operating condition; one is currently undergoing overhaul and one is Awaiting Overhaul. There are also two electric locomotives and many IC locomotives.

== History ==
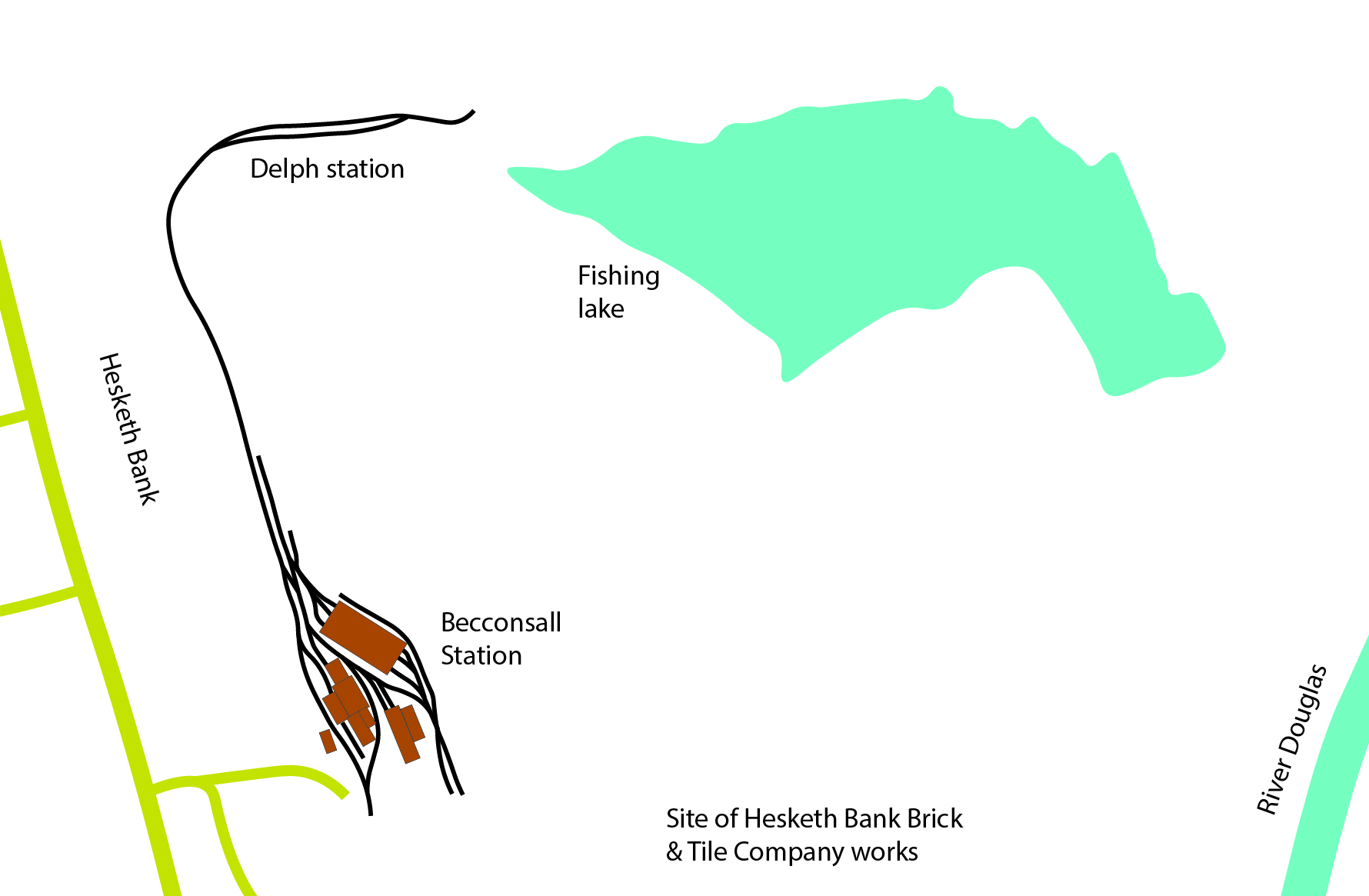
Map of the railway in 2017

Running Shed

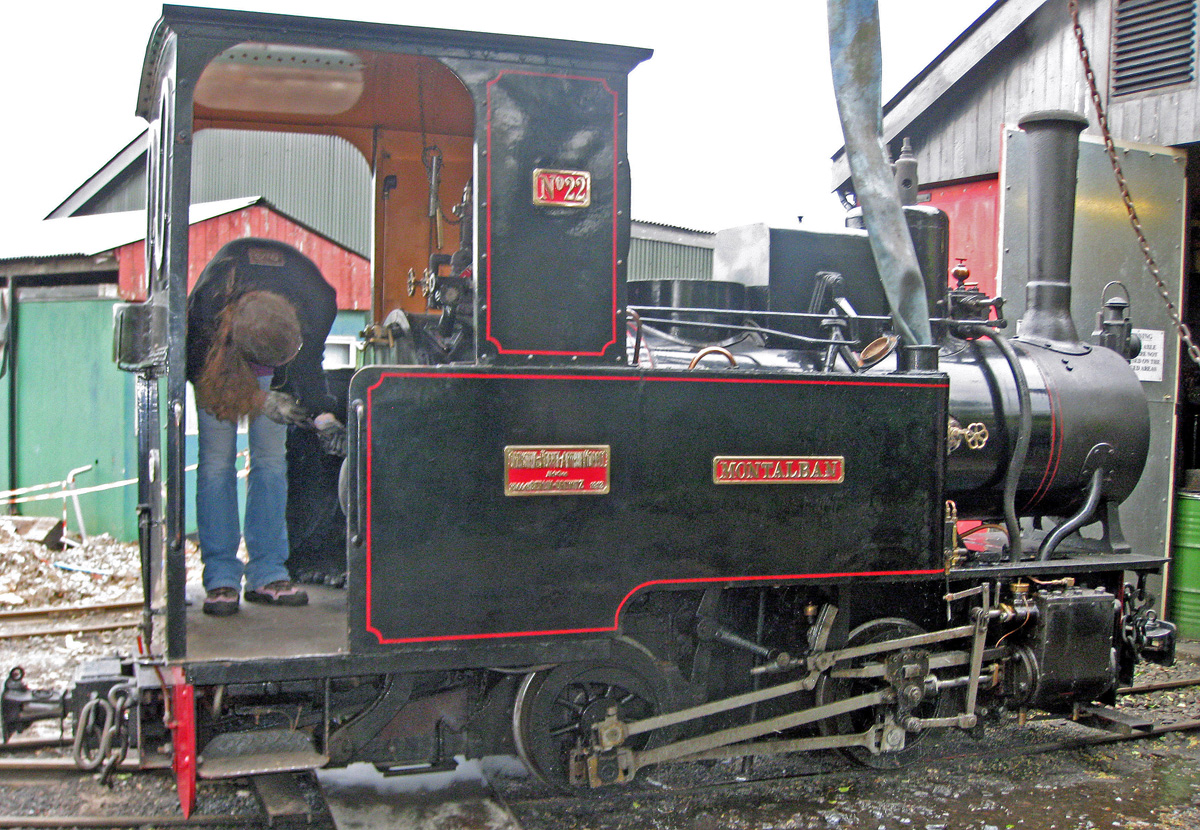
Montalban built in 1913 being serviced and watered

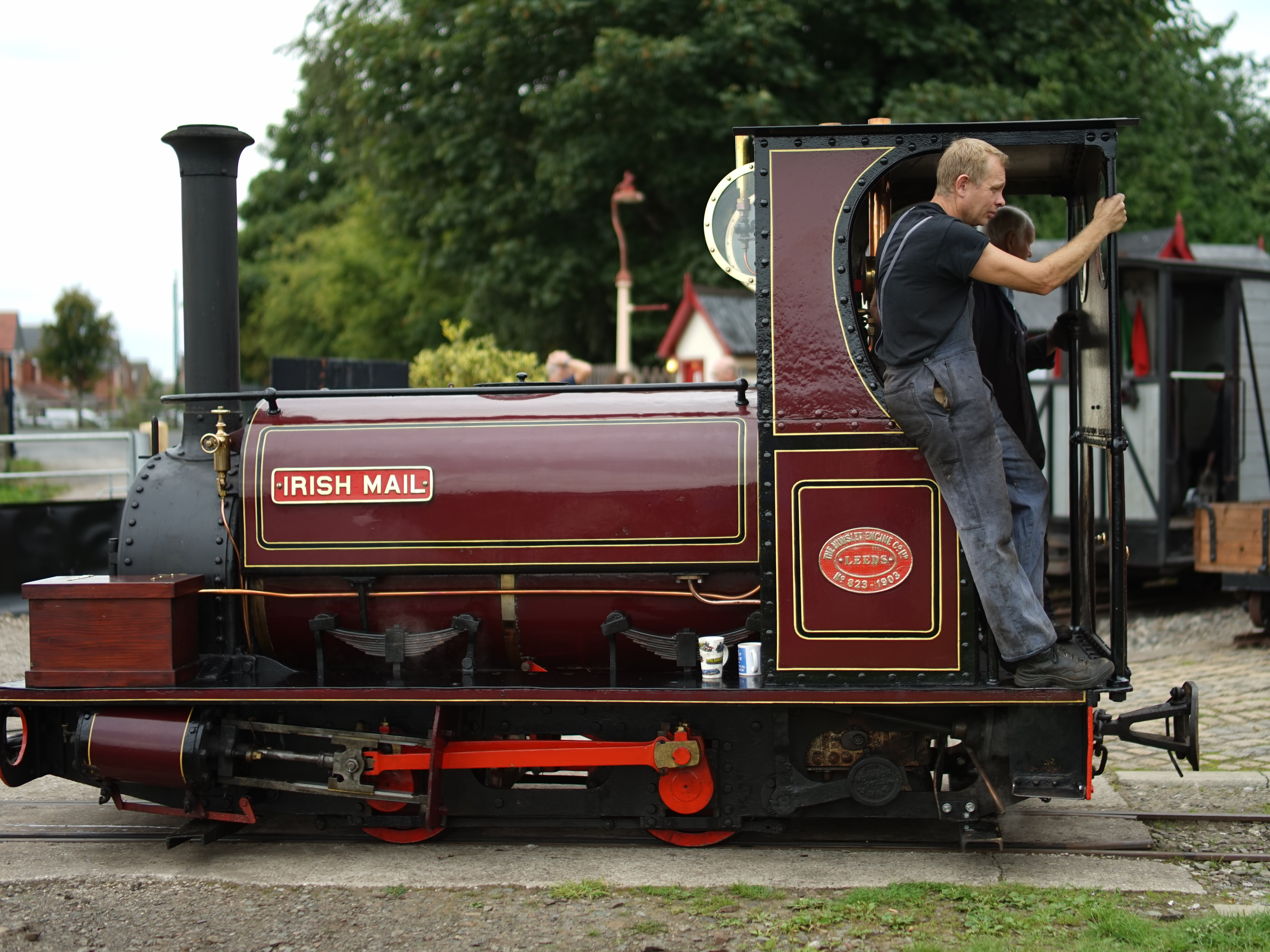
Irish Mail

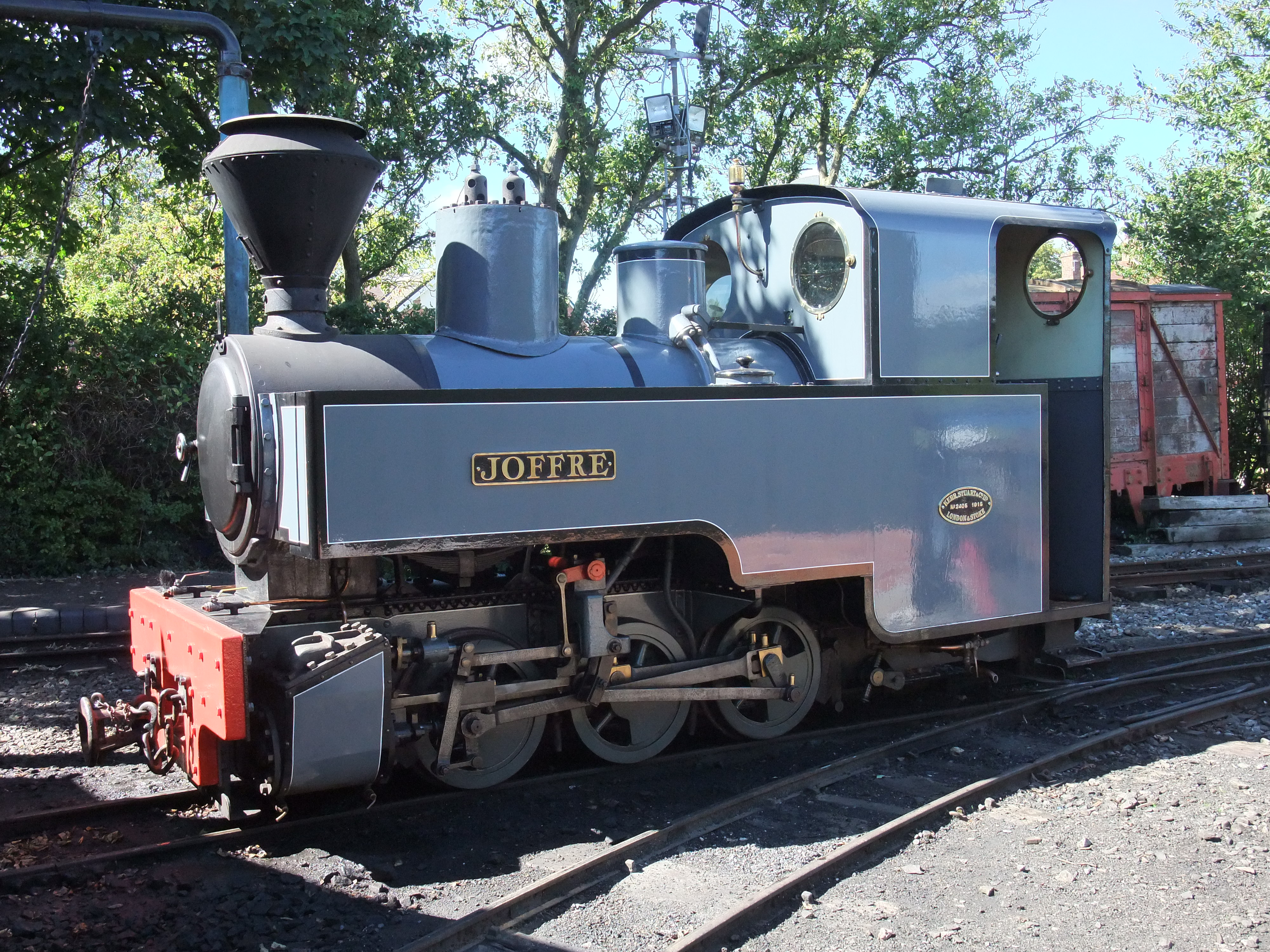
Joffre

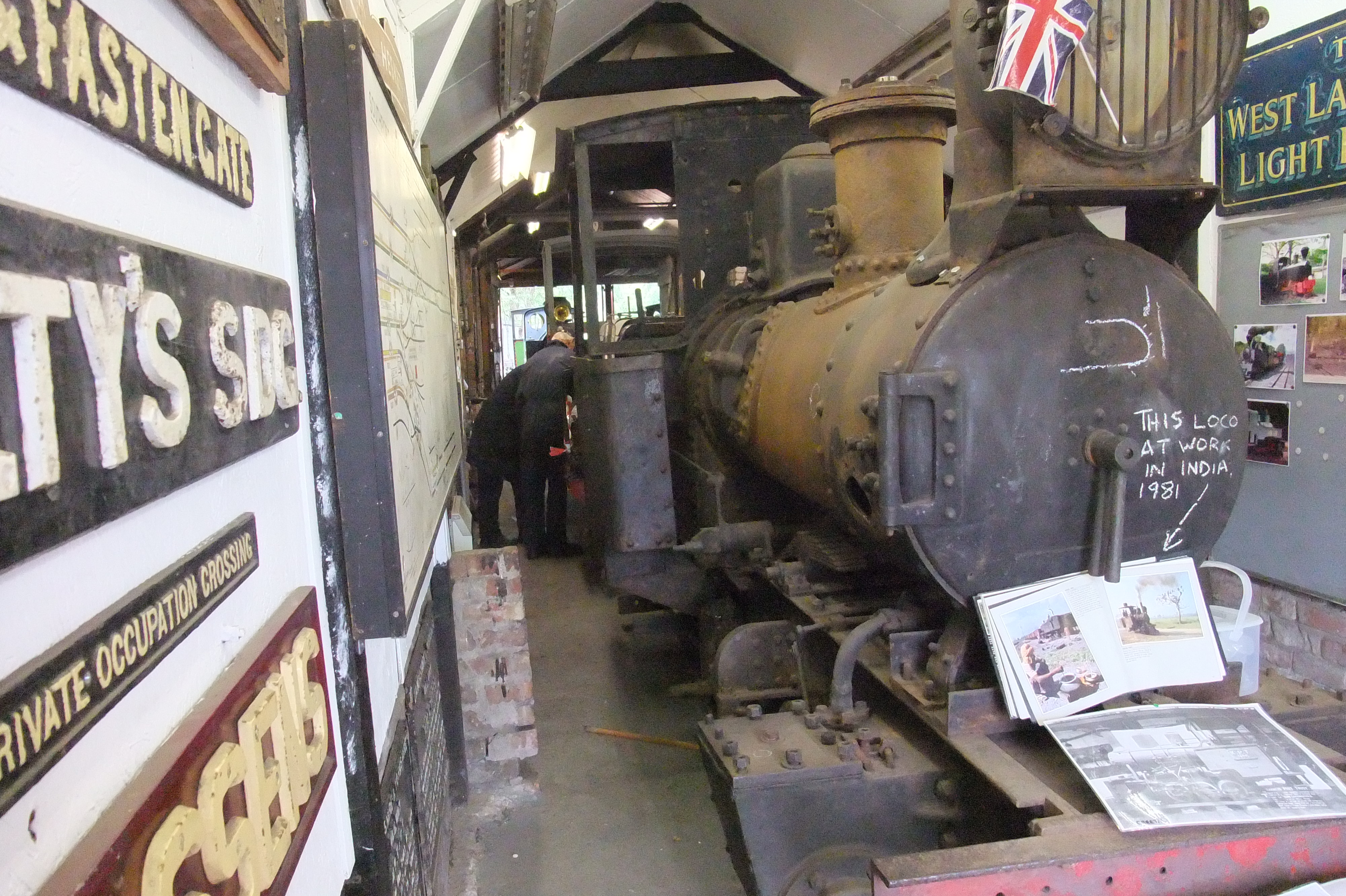
Cheetal in the workshop

The West Lancashire Light Railway was started in 1967, by six railway enthusiast schoolboys from the Hesketh Bank area. They wanted to save the narrow gauge railway equipment which was disappearing from local industries. They leased a strip of land above the clay pits at Alty's Brickworks and started laying track using rails from the former clay tramways and rough timbers as sleepers.

Two Ruston and Hornsby diesel locomotives were acquired from Burscough Brick & Tile Co. one with a 13 hp engine, the other a 20 hp model, they were respectively named Clwyd and Tawd. Clwyd was the first locomotive to run on the railway in 1969. These two locos were soon joined by more industrial diesels and the first home-built items of rolling stock.

At first, trains were operated on a "travel at your own risk" basis. The first formal timetable was issued in 1971.

In 1970, the railway acquired an incomplete set of parts of 1903 Quarry Hunslet steam locomotive Irish Mail, from Dinorwic slate quarry in North Wales. The major missing component was a boiler. Members of the WLLR retrieved the remains of Quarry Hunslet Alice from one of the upper levels of Dinorwic. Alice's boiler was retained at the WLLR and the rest sold to the Bala Lake Railway. Over the next decade the railway re-assembled Irish Mail and the locomotive was steamed for the first time in 1980.

The running line slowly grew in length until it ran from Becconsall to a station known as Asland, which is no longer the far terminus of the line. The line in its present form runs from Becconsall to Delph, with the original track to Asland running on from Delph but not suitable for running engines.

In 2015, the WLLR hosted a gala to celebrate the 100th. anniversary of its Joffre class Kerr Stuart locomotive. A second Joffre class locomotive, No. 3014, attended from Apedale Valley Light Railway. This was the first time that two WWI-era Joffre locomotives had been in steam together in preservation.

The railway is twinned with the Chemin de Fer de Rillé in France.

== Facilities ==
The railway's sheds and workshops are situated at Becconsall station. The first shed was built by the members using cast-off bricks from Alty's. This original workshop has been much added to over the years and the equipment in this workshop allows most of the work on restoring a steam locomotive to be undertaken, excluding boiler construction. Facilities for visitors have also been built at Becconsall.

== Operations ==
The WLLR is open to the public on Sundays and Bank Holidays from Easter to the end of October, also on some other days during school holidays. Passengers can ride in semi-open coaches which have been built by the railway's volunteers. Gala weekends are also organised, when visiting steam locomotives can be seen in operation. Other events include Easter Egg Hunt, Teddy Bears' Day, Friendly Engines Day, Strawberries and Steam, Halloween, Princess and Pirates Day, Pumpkin Express, Volunteers Day, Children in Need, and Santa Specials.

'Drive an Engine' days can be arranged for individuals or small groups to learn how to operate a steam engine. Bookings can also be taken for birthday parties (and other types of celebration) and for visits by schools, colleges, clubs and societies.

== Rolling stock ==
=== Steam locomotives ===
Number	Name	Builder	Type	Class	Works number	Built	Status	Notes
3	Irish Mail	Hunslet	0-4-0ST	Dinorwic Alice Class	823	1903	Boiler ticket expired 2025. Currently undergoing overhaul	Ex. Dinorwic Slate Quarry, Wales
8	Joffre	Kerr Stuart	0-6-0T+WT	'Joffre' class	2405	1915	Restored in 2012. Awaiting overhaul following expiry of boiler ticket in August 2021.	Ex. WW1 French Artillery Railways
22	Montalban	Orenstein and Koppel	0-4-0T+WT		6641	1913	Operational.	Ex. Minas y Ferrocarril de Utrillas, Aragon, Spain
	Sybil	Bagnall	0-4-0ST		1706	1906	Operational. Restoration completed 2024.	Ex. Dinorwic Slate Quarry, Wales

=== Internal combustion locomotives ===
Number	Name	Builder	Works number	Built	Type	Status	Notes
1	Clwyd	Ruston and Hornsby	264251	1951	4wDM	Operational.	ex-Burscough Brick and Tile, First loco owned by the railway
2	Tawd	Ruston and Hornsby	222074	1943	4wDM	Operational	ex-Burscough Brick & Tile
4	Bradfield	Hibberd	1777	1931	4wPM	Awaiting Overhaul	ex-Sheffield Corporation, Lower Bradfield
5		Ruston and Hornsby	200478	1940	4wDM	Awaiting Overhaul	ex-Liverpool Corporation, Horwich
7		Motor Rail	8992	1946	4wDM		ex-Furness Brick & Tile Co of Askam, purchased in 1973
8	Pathfinder	Hunslet	4480	1953	4wDM		Ex-ICI Gathurst.
10	Planet	Hibberd	2555	1942	4wDM	Operational	ex-Liverpool Waterworks, LLanforda Hall. Donated to the Railway in 2026 by National Museums Liverpool After being on loan for 50 years.
11	Commonly Referred to as "Bread Bin"	Motor Rail	5906	1934	4wDM	Operational	ex-Middleton Towers sand railway.
12		Motor Rail	11258	1964	4wDM	Operational	ex-Pilkington Bros Ltd., St Helens.
		Motor Rail	7955	1945	4wDM	Dismantled	Rebuilt at the WLLR in 1987. ex-Middleton Towers sand railway.
16		Ruston and Hornsby	202036	1941	4wDM	Dismantled	ex-NW Water Authority, Great Harwood.
19		Lister	10805	1939	4wPM		ex- Wheatley & Co. Springfield Tileries Trent Vale.
20		Baguley	3002	1937	4wPM		ex-North Calder Water Board.
21		Hunslet	1963	1939	4wDM		ex-Borough of Burnley Altham Sewage Works.
25		Ruston and Hornsby	297054	1950	4wDM		
26		Motor Rail	11223	1963	4wDM		
31	Mill Reef	Motor Rail	7371	1939	4wDM	Currently undergoing overhaul as of November 2026.	ex-Leighton Buzzard Light Railway
36		Ruston and Hornsby	339105	1953	4wDM		Acquired in 1985 from Scotland.
38		Hudswell Clarke	DM750	1949	0-4-0DMF		
39	Black Pig	Hibberd	3916	1959	4wDM	Stored At Willow Tree Halt Sidings.	
40	Dame Vera Duckworth	Ruston and Hornsby	381705	1956	4wDM		
49	Samson	Hibberd	1887	1934	4wDM		
		Hudswell Clarke	DM1393	1967	0-6-0DMF		
		Lister	29890	1946	4wDM	Dismantled	

=== Electric Locomotives ===
Number	Name	Builder	Works number	Built	Type	Status	Notes
19		BEV	613	1972	4wBE		Regauged from 2 ft 6 in (762 mm).
25		BEV	692	1974	4wBE		Regauged from 2 ft 6 in (762 mm)
	Greenbat	Greenwood and Batley	1840	1942	0-4-0BE	Awaiting Restoration	Ex. RAF Fauld
	Welsh Pony	BEV	640	1926	0-4-0OE	Awaiting restoration	Ex. Llechwedd Slate Quarry. Displayed at Gloddfa Ganol until 1998.

=== Wagons ===
The WLLR and its members own a variety of goods wagons obtained from several UK industrial narrow gauge railways, including tipper sand wagons from Pilkington Brothers sandfields in the Rainford and Bickerstaffe areas.

== See also ==
- British narrow gauge railways
- Lakeside Miniature Railway, Southport
- Moseley Railway Trust
- Amerton Railway
