= Pentrepiod Halt railway station (Gwynedd) =

Railway station in Gwynedd, Wales

Coordinates: 52.867390°N 3.643121°W

Pentrepiod ([pɛntrəˈpiːɔd] - 'Magpie Village') railway station is a small unstaffed railway halt on the Bala Lake Railway alongside the B4403. Trains will stop here by request only, and the station can only be accessed by means of footpaths around the lake. The station has a short platform (one coach length only) and a station name board and is situated on the east side of a private crossing. There are no station buildings.

== History ==
The Bala Lake Railway opened in August 1972, with Pentrepiod as the eastern terminus of the line. The station retained this position until the start of the 1973 operating season, by which time the first extension (to Llangower) had been opened.

== Neighbouring stations ==
Preceding station	Heritage railways	Following station
Llanuwchllyn Terminus	Bala Lake Railway	Llangower towards Bala (Penybont)

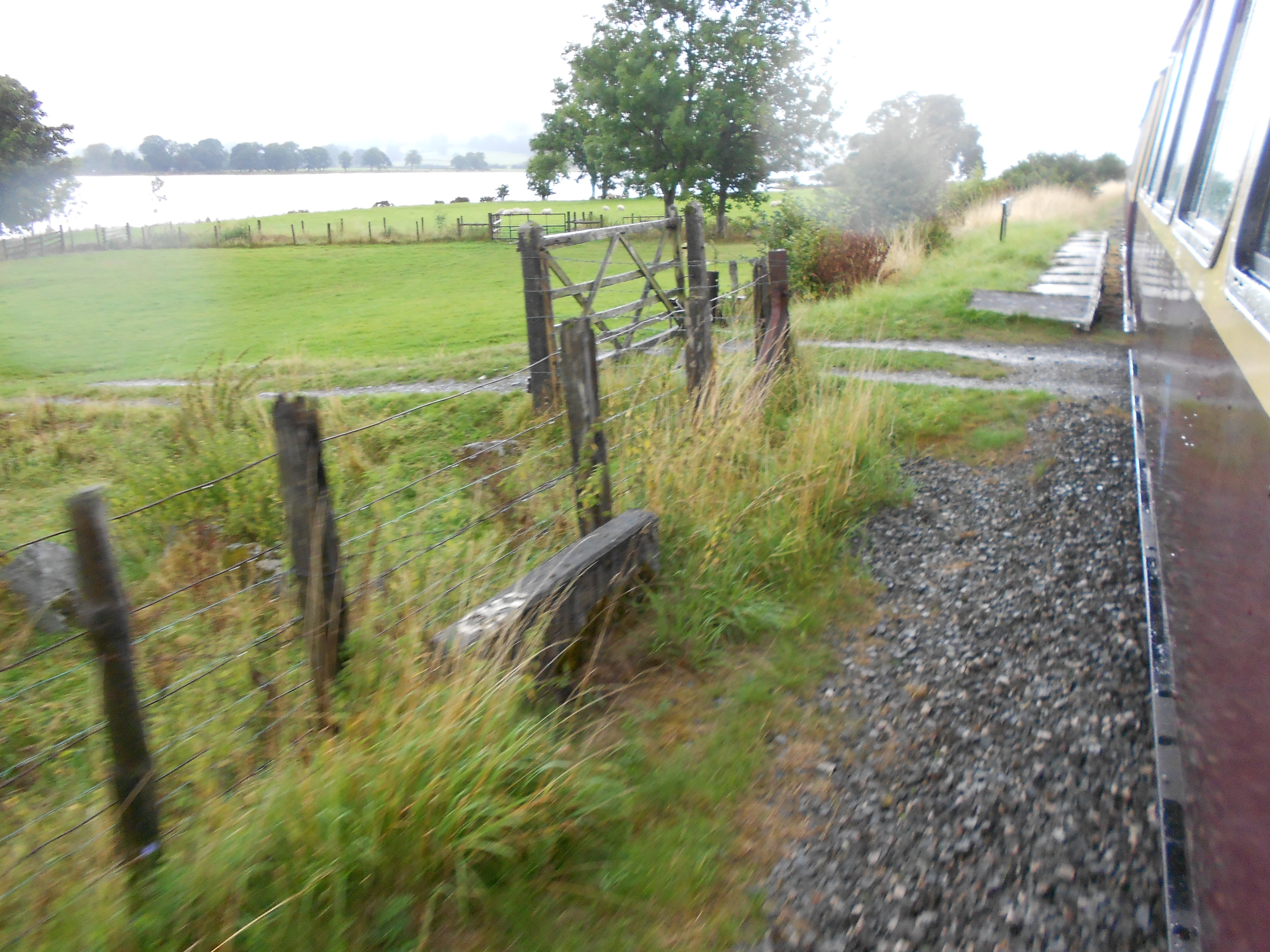
The single platform at Pentrepiod.
