= Glan Llyn Halt railway station =

Railway station in Gwynedd, Wales

Glan Llyn Halt
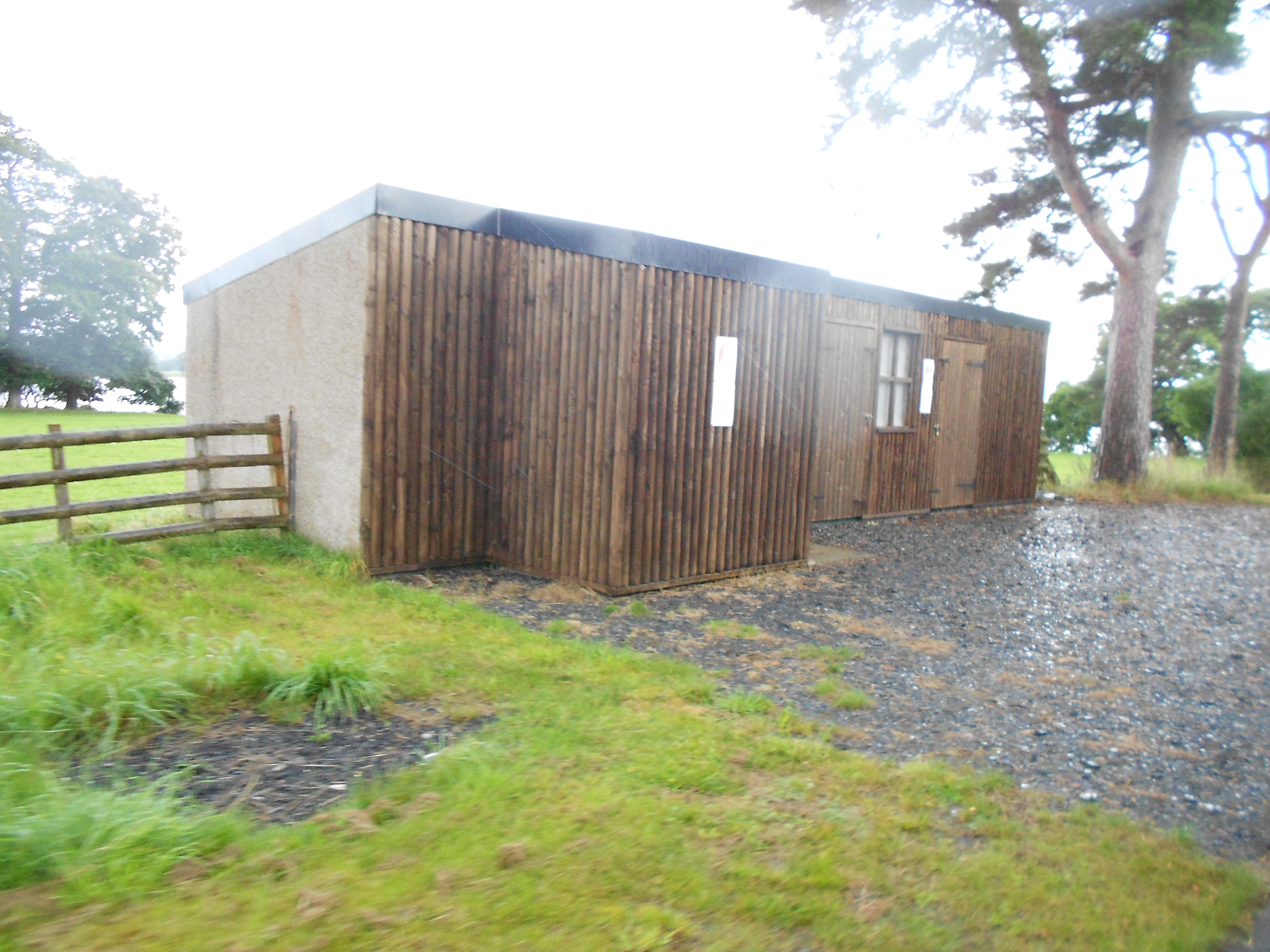
- Current station buildings at Glan Llyn Halt

General information
- Location: Llyn Tegid, Gwynedd; Wales
- Coordinates: 52.8694°N 3.6402°W
- System: Station on heritage railway
- Operator: Bala Lake Railway
- Platforms: 1

History
- Post-grouping: Great Western Railway

Key dates
- 14 September 1931: Opened
- 18 January 1965: Closed
- Present day: Limited-use service for Santa Special trains
Location

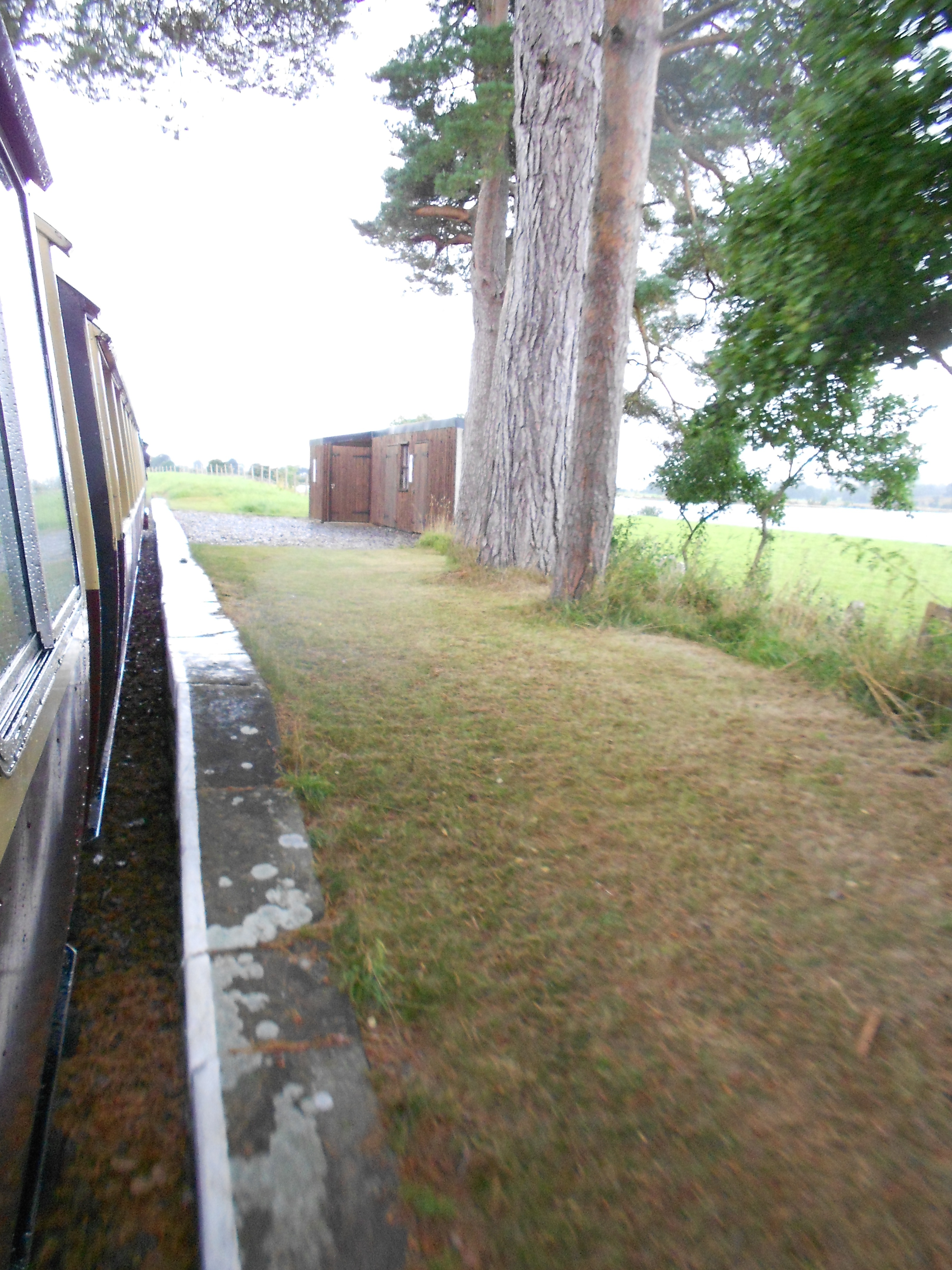
Glan Llyn Halt platform.

Glan Llyn Halt in Gwynedd, Wales, was a railway halt on the Ruabon to Barmouth line on the south shore of Llyn Tegid (Bala Lake), and is a limited-use station on the Bala Lake Railway which operates over part of the same route.

== History ==
It was opened as Flag Station Halt in 1868, a private station built for Sir Watkin Williams-Wynn, 6th Baronet but which could be used by the public by his consent. It was officially advertised as Flag Station from 14 September 1931, the name given as Sir Watkin or his staff would stop the train by raising a flag. It gained the 'Halt' suffix from 4 July 1938 and finally became Glan Llyn Halt on 25 September 1950. There was never a signal box, passing place nor freight facilities here. It closed in 1965. The Bala Lake Railway opened in 1972, but did not reach Glan Llyn until the following year. The station here remained closed, and was not re-opened until the early part of the twenty-first century when the station was chosen to play a role in special "Santa Special" trains.

== Facilities ==
There is no public access to the station by road, and regular service trains do not stop here. However, a large station building has been opened, and from the early part of the twenty-first century Glan Llyn has served as the Haunted house and as Santa's Grotto for special trains operated each year at Halloween and Christmas.

Preceding station	Disused railways	Following station
Llanuwchllyn	Great Western Railway; Ruabon Barmouth Line	Llangower
