= Drws-y-Nant =

Coordinates: 52.789°N 3.756°W

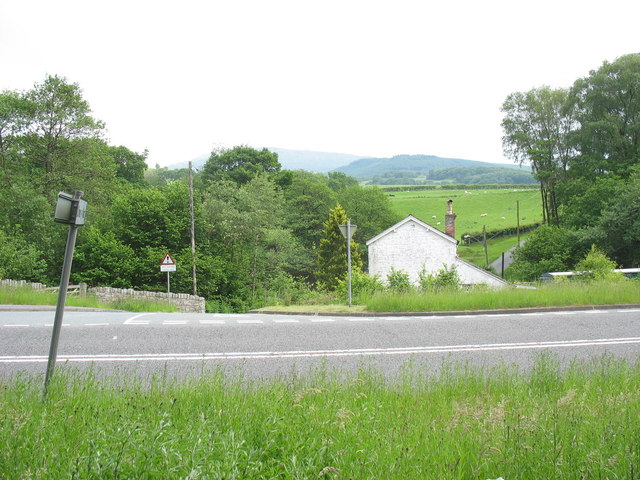
- Old station house at Drws-y-Nant seen across a new section of the A494

- Location within Gwynedd
- OS grid reference: SH815227
- Community: Brithdir and Llanfachreth
- Principal area: Gwynedd
- Country: Wales
- Sovereign state: United Kingdom
- Post town: DOLGELLAU
- Postcode district: LL40
- Dialling code: 01341
- Police: North Wales
- Fire: North Wales
- Ambulance: Welsh
- UK Parliament: Dwyfor Meirionnydd
- Senedd Cymru – Welsh Parliament: Dwyfor Meirionnydd

Drws-y-Nant is a village in Gwynedd, Wales, located between Dolgellau and Bala.

It was formerly served by the Drws-y-Nant railway station but this closed in 1965.
