= Long Eaton West Park Railway =

Railway line in England

The West Park Railway or Wilsthorpe Light Railway was a narrow gauge railway within West Park, Long Eaton in Derbyshire, England.

Initial construction took place up to May 1966. The railway opened to the public on 28 May 1966.

In March 1975, the line was transferred to Narrotrack of Sheffield. During 1975 the track layout was simplified and re-gauged from 2-foot-gauge (600 mm) down to 10.25-inch-gauge (260 mm).

On 6 July 1977 all remaining rolling stock was relocated to a new home at the Bala Lake Railway in Wales.

== Rolling stock ==
- No. 1, Ruston & Hornsby, from British Gypsum, Gotham, Nottinghamshire
- No. 2, Lister Blackstone, from Beeston Sewage Works, Beeston, Nottinghamshire
- No. 7, Motor Rail 5821, built 1934, via Alan Keef Ltd. At Long Eaton 4 August 1975‒6 July 1977.
- Two "Manrider" passenger wagons, from National Coal Board, Morton Colliery, Morten Colliery
