= Holy War (locomotive) =

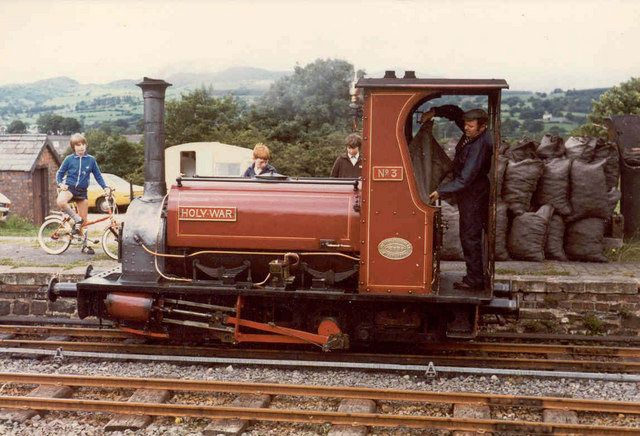
- Holy War at Llanuwchllyn in August 1981
Type and origin
- Power type: Steam
- Builder: Hunslet Engine Company
- Serial number: 779
- Build date: 1902
Specifications
- Configuration
  - Whyte: 0-4-0ST
- Gauge: 2 ft (610 mm)
Career
- Operators: Dinorwic Slate Quarry; Buckinghamshire Railway Centre; Bala Lake Railway
- Numbers: BLR: 3
- Delivered: May 1902
- Withdrawn: 1967
- Restored: 1978
- Current owner: Bala Lake Railway

Holy War is a preserved narrow gauge steam locomotive built in 1902, based at the Bala Lake Railway in North Wales. It was the last steam locomotive to operate in a Welsh slate quarry.

== Construction ==
Holy War was built in 1902 by the Hunslet Engine Company of Leeds, with works number 779.

== Working life ==
Holy War was delivered to the Dinorwic quarry in North Wales in May 1902. It spent its whole working life in the quarry, alongside other Hunslet engines including Dolbadarn, George B, Maid Marian, Red Damsel, Wild Aster, Alice and Irish Mail. Holy War was named in 1908, one of the quarry's locomotives with names commemorating racehorses which author and Member of Parliament Sir Gerald Nabarro called "extraordinary" and "eccentric".

By 1967 Holy War was the last steam locomotive in operation in a North Wales slate quarry, being withdrawn in November that year. The quarry switched to lorries when Holy War was sold, and closed in 1969.

== Preservation ==
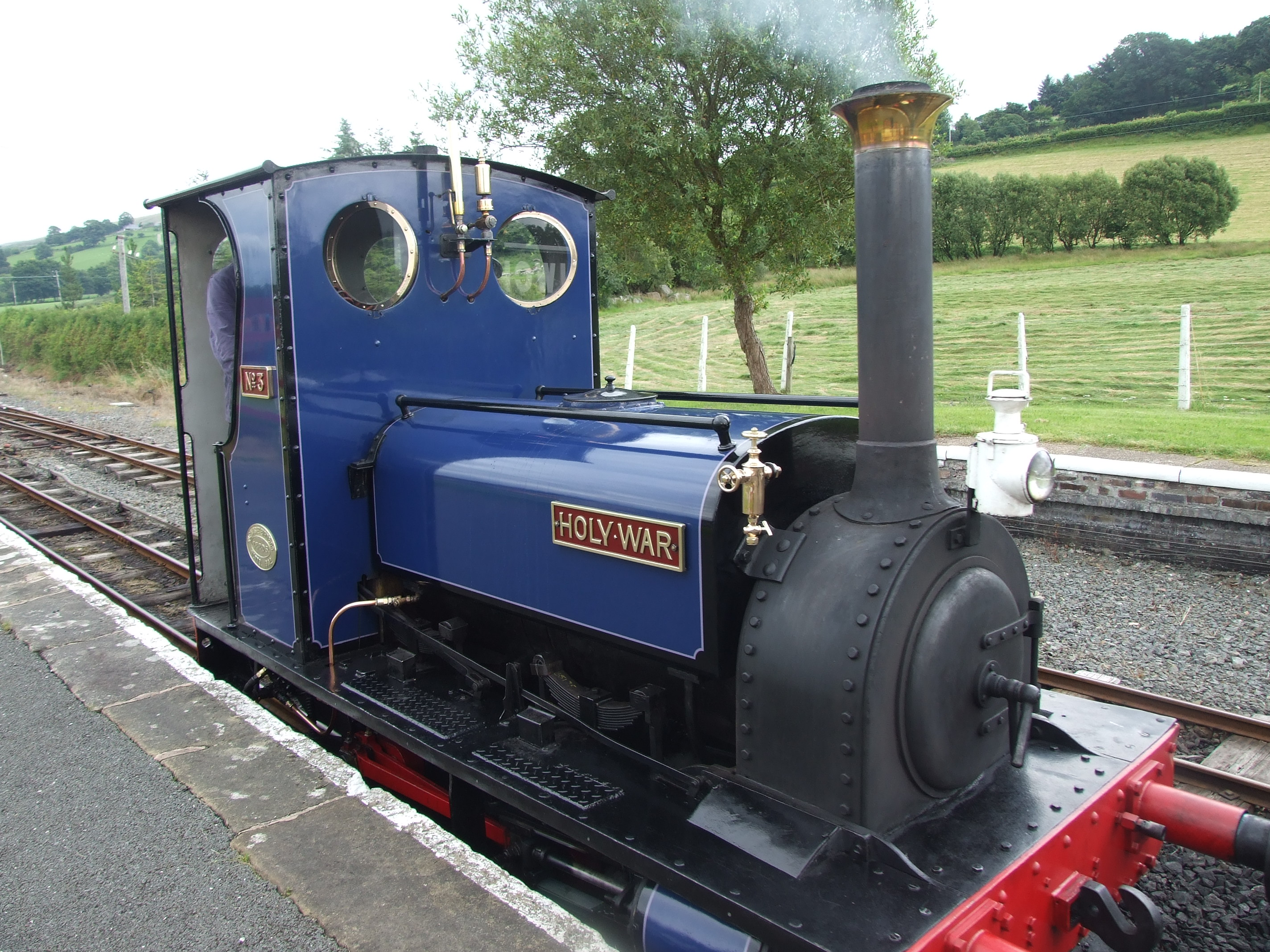
Holy War at the Lake Bala Railway in 2010

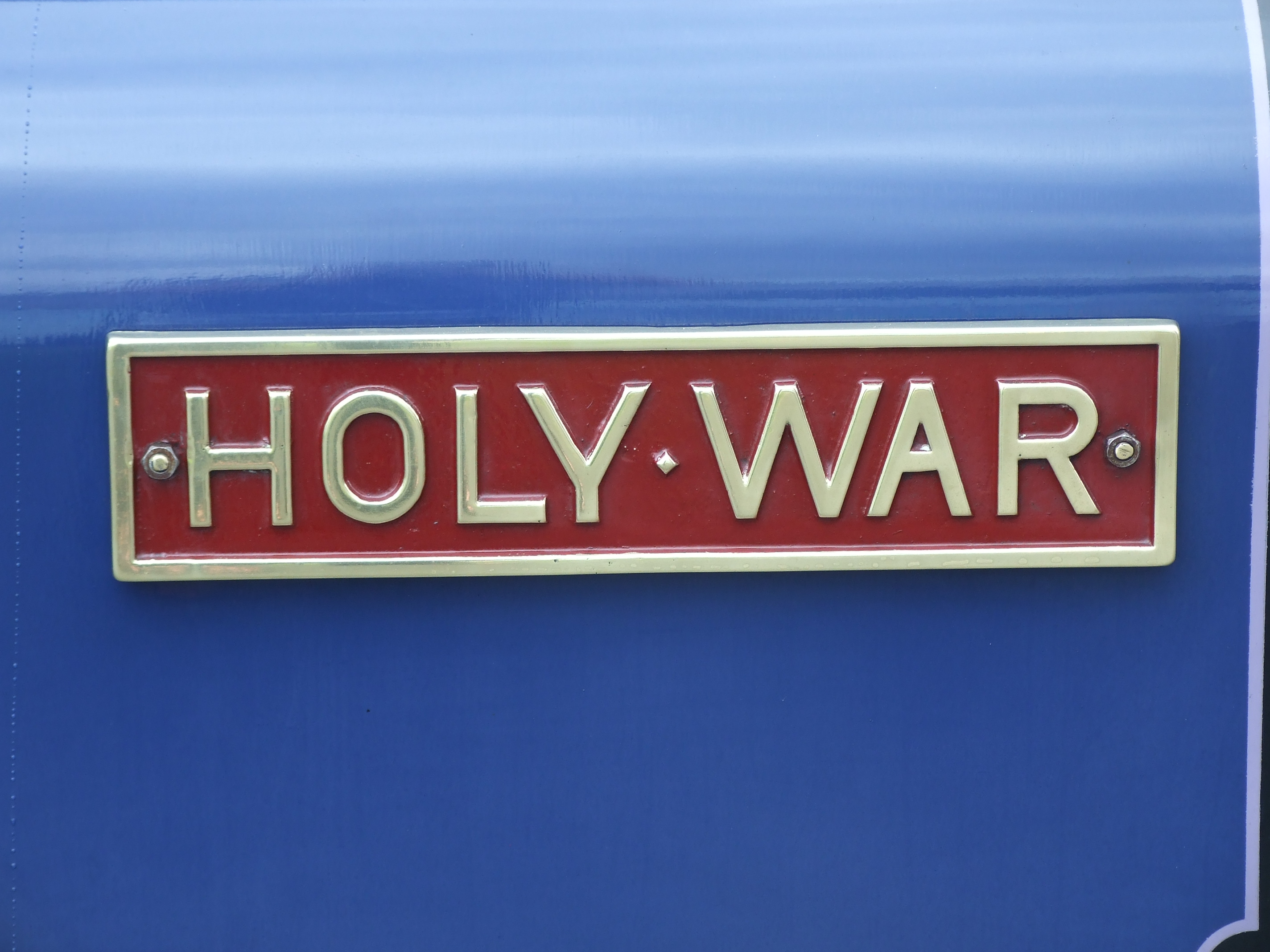
Name plate

When steam operations ended at the quarry Holy War was sold to J Marshfield-Hutchings. Along with parts of Alice which had been bought for spares, Holy War went to the Buckinghamshire Railway Centre in March 1970, where it was the Quainton Railway Society's only narrow gauge locomotive. After being used in Buckinghamshire it was purchased by Rev Alan Cliff and returned to Wales in 1975, going to the Bala Lake Railway. Restoration of Holy War was completed in 1978 and the locomotive entered traffic on Good Friday 1979. It was out of service for boiler repairs in 1985-87. The Bala Lake Railway bought Holy War from Cliff in 1989. A gala was held in June 2002 to mark the locomotive's 100th anniversary.

Alice has also since been restored, and both locomotives now work on Bala Lake Railway.

Holy War appears in the children's book "Jack the Station Cat and the Great Little Trains Robbery".
