= Bala (Penybont) railway station =

Railway station in Gwynedd, Wales

Coordinates: 52°54′05″N 3°35′36″W

Bala Lake Halt
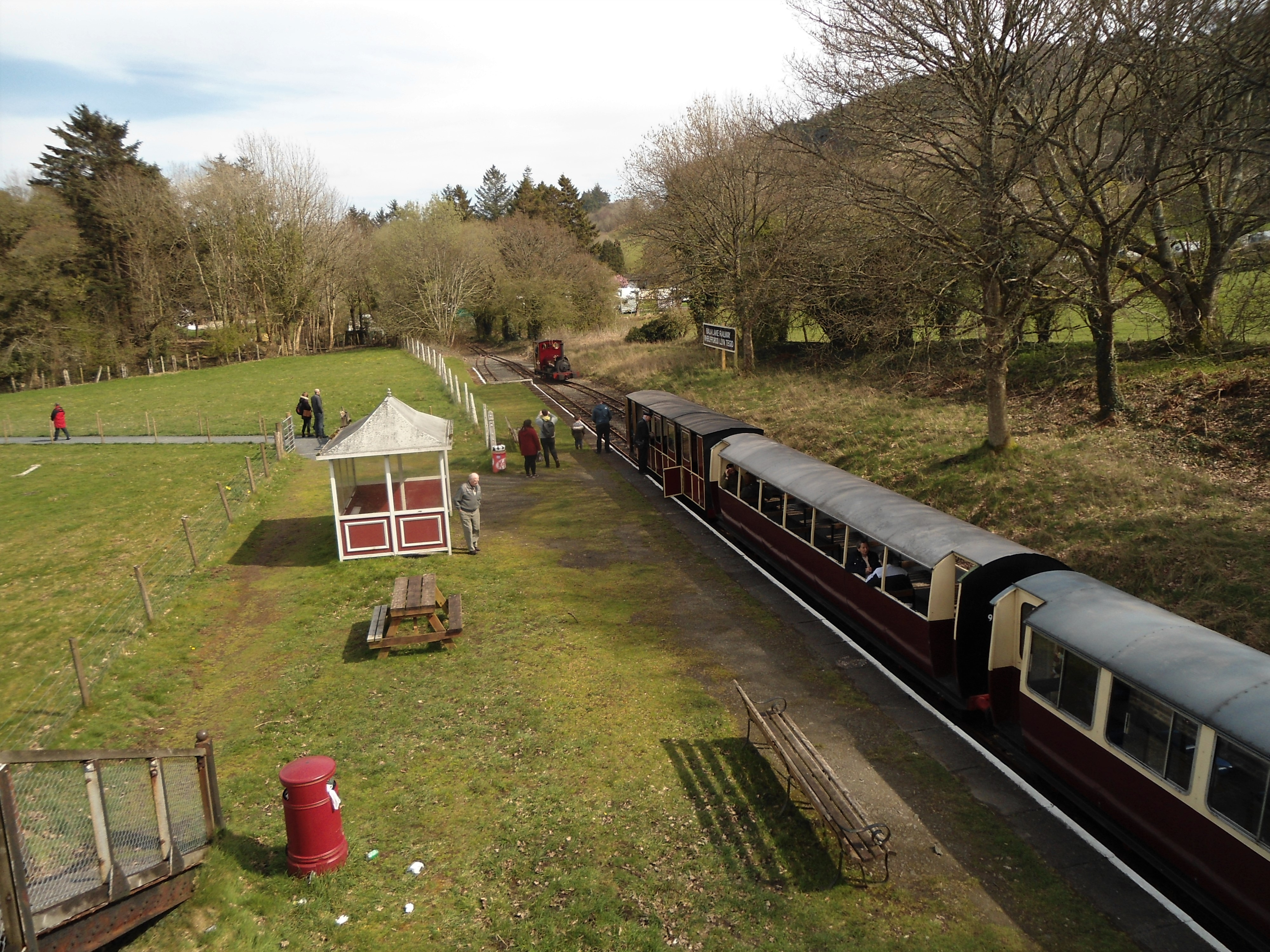
- The station in April 2019

General information
- Location: Bala, Gwynedd; Wales
- Platforms: 1

Other information
- Status: Disused

History
- Original company: Great Western Railway
- Post-grouping: Great Western Railway

Key dates
- 5 February 1934: Opened
- 25 September 1939: Closed
- 25 March 1976: Opens as Bala (Llyn Tegid)
Location

Bala (Penybont) is the current terminus of the heritage Bala Lake Railway, in Gwynedd, Wales, since 1976. The site was formerly the location of the Bala Lake Halt railway station, a former station on the Ruabon to Barmouth line.

The narrow-gauge Bala Lake Railway originally named the station Bala (Llyn Tegid) (Llyn Tegid is the Welsh name for Bala Lake).

== History ==
The first station for Bala opened on the site in 1868 but closed in 1882 when the Bala (New) station opened nearer the town. Opened by the Great Western Railway in 1934, it closed in 1939. In 1976 the Bala Lake Railway opened its eastern terminus on the site. The Bala Lake Railway began passenger services in 1972, and opened extensions in 1973 and 1975. Bala was reached in 1976. Writing in the railway directory "Steam '81" the general manager, G H Barnes, stated: "We aim to be in Bala near Loch Cafe in 1981, distance then 5.25 miles." This was an official prediction of the further extension of the line into Bala town centre, but the work was not carried out, and the statement was not repeated in the following year's directory, "Steam '82", leaving Bala (Llyn Tegid) as the eastern terminus of the line.

Preceding station	Heritage railways	Following station
Llangower towards Llanuwchllyn	Bala Lake Railway	Terminus
Disused railways
Bryn Hynod Halt towards Llanuwchllyn	Bala Lake Railway until 2011	Terminus
Historical railways
Llangower	Great Western Railway	Bala Junction
