= Maid Marian (locomotive) =

Preserved Welsh narrow-gauge steam locomotive

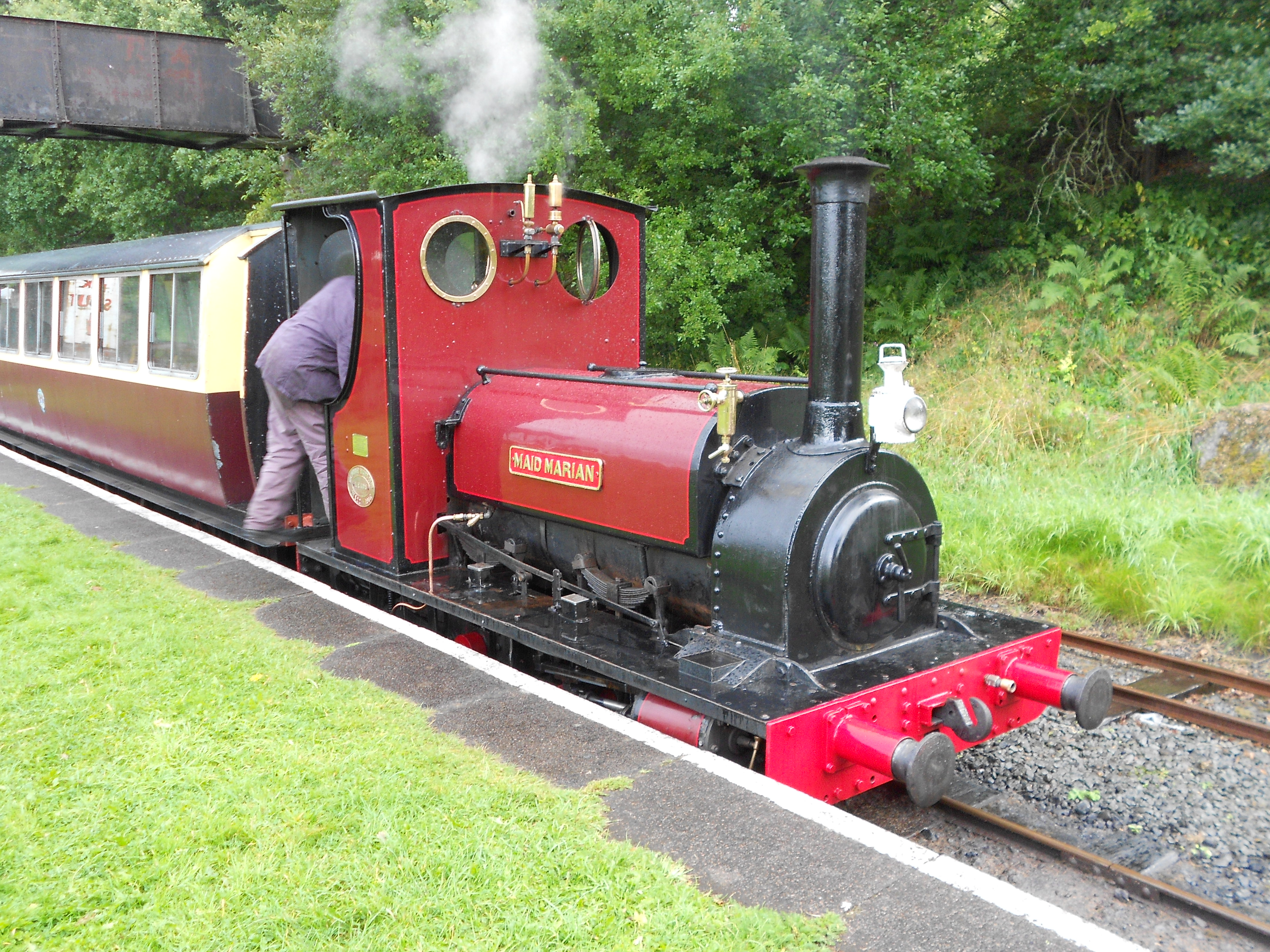
- Maid Marian at Bala
Type and origin
- Power type: Steam
- Builder: Hunslet
- Build date: 1903
Specifications
- Configuration
  - Whyte: 0-4-0ST
- Gauge: 2 ft (610 mm)
Career
- Disposition: Preserved

Maid Marian is a preserved narrow-gauge steam locomotive built in 1903, currently based at the Bala Lake Railway in North Wales.

== Construction ==
Maid Marian, works number 822 and subsequently named after a racehorse, was built in 1903 by the Hunslet Engine Company based in Leeds. It is a member of the Dinorwic Alice Class.

== Working life ==
Maid Marian spent its entire industrial life working at the Dinorwic quarry in North Wales. It operated alongside many Hunslet engines, including Holy War, Dolbadarn, George B, Red Damsel, Wild Aster, Alice and Irish Mail.

== Preservation ==
The Maid Marian Locomotive Fund was established in 1965 by a group of railway enthusiasts seeking to preserve a working locomotive from the Dinorwic Slate Quarry. The Quarry Manager recommended Maid Marian as the best locomotive then available. MMLF purchased the loco in 1965, taking possession in 1967.

Maid Marian operated at the Bressingham Steam Museum from 1967 to 1971, before going to the Llanberis Lake Railway until 1975, and then to the Bala Lake Railway. It returned to Llanberis for the 2011 gala.

Israel Newton built a new boiler in 2006.
