= Garneddwen Halt railway station =

Disused railway station in Gwynedd, Wales

Coordinates: 52.8287°N 3.7076°W

Garneddwen Halt
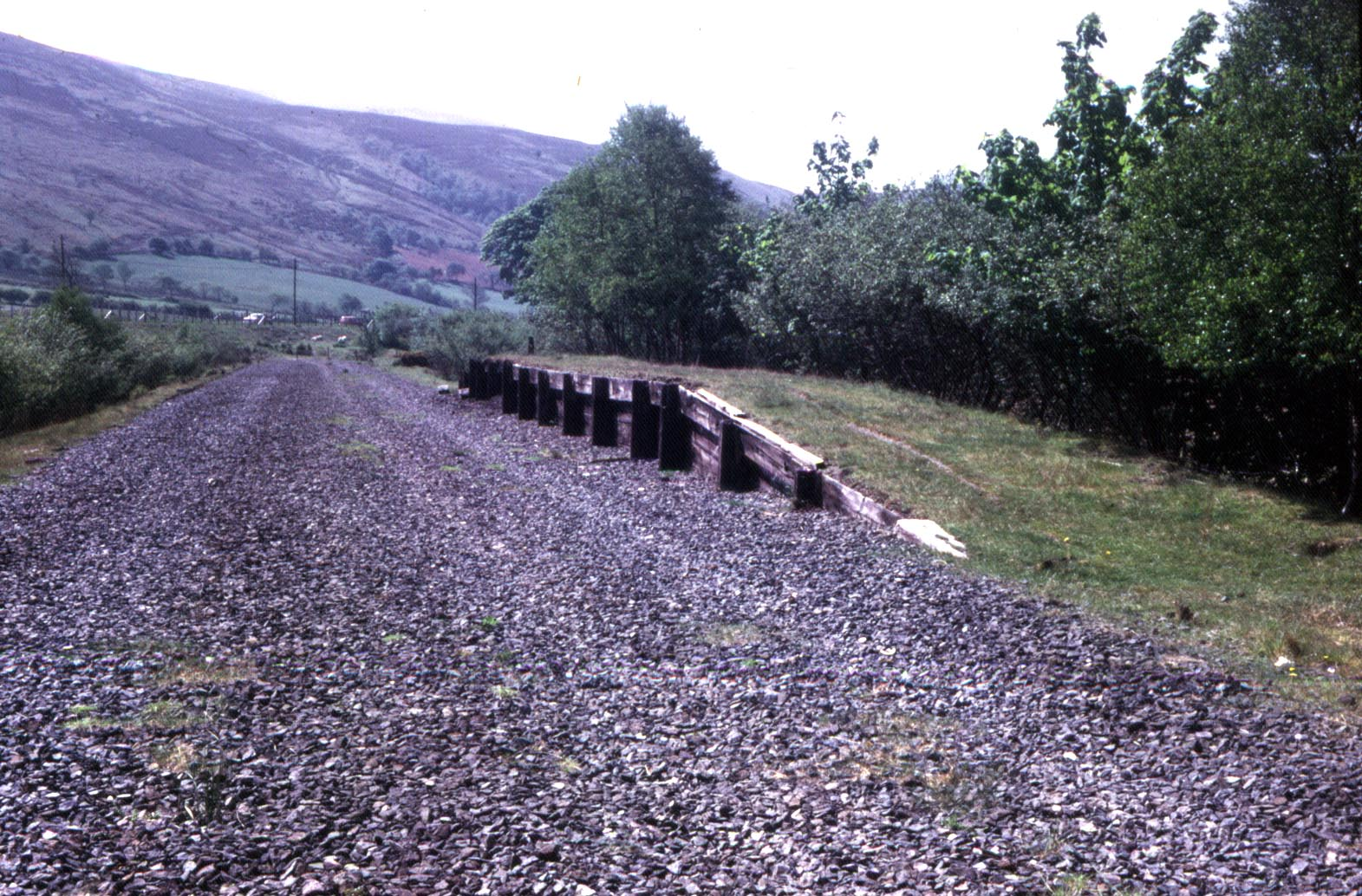
- The Up platform at Garneddwen Halt in May 1975, looking West towards Barmouth.

General information
- Location: Garneddwen, Gwynedd; Wales
- Grid reference: SH849269
- Platforms: 2

Other information
- Status: Disused

History
- Post-grouping: Great Western Railway

Key dates
- 9 Jul 1928: Opened
- 18 January 1965: Closed
Location

Garneddwen Halt in Merioneth (now Gwynedd), Wales, was formerly a station at the summit of the Great Western Railway Ruabon to Barmouth line. It closed to passengers on Monday 18 January 1965.

This should not be confused with Garneddwen Station on the narrow-gauge Corris Railway.

The station had two short staggered platforms with a passing loop and signal box. The station could only be accessed by a path from the Bala to Dolgellau road. Both platforms are still extant on farmland and can be seen from the A494. To the North was Rhydydrain level crossing where the standard crossing keepers house survives. This was formerly the home of the regular Garneddwen signalman Martin Jones and his wife. Mrs Jones was the crossing keeper until the position was withdrawn in the 1960s

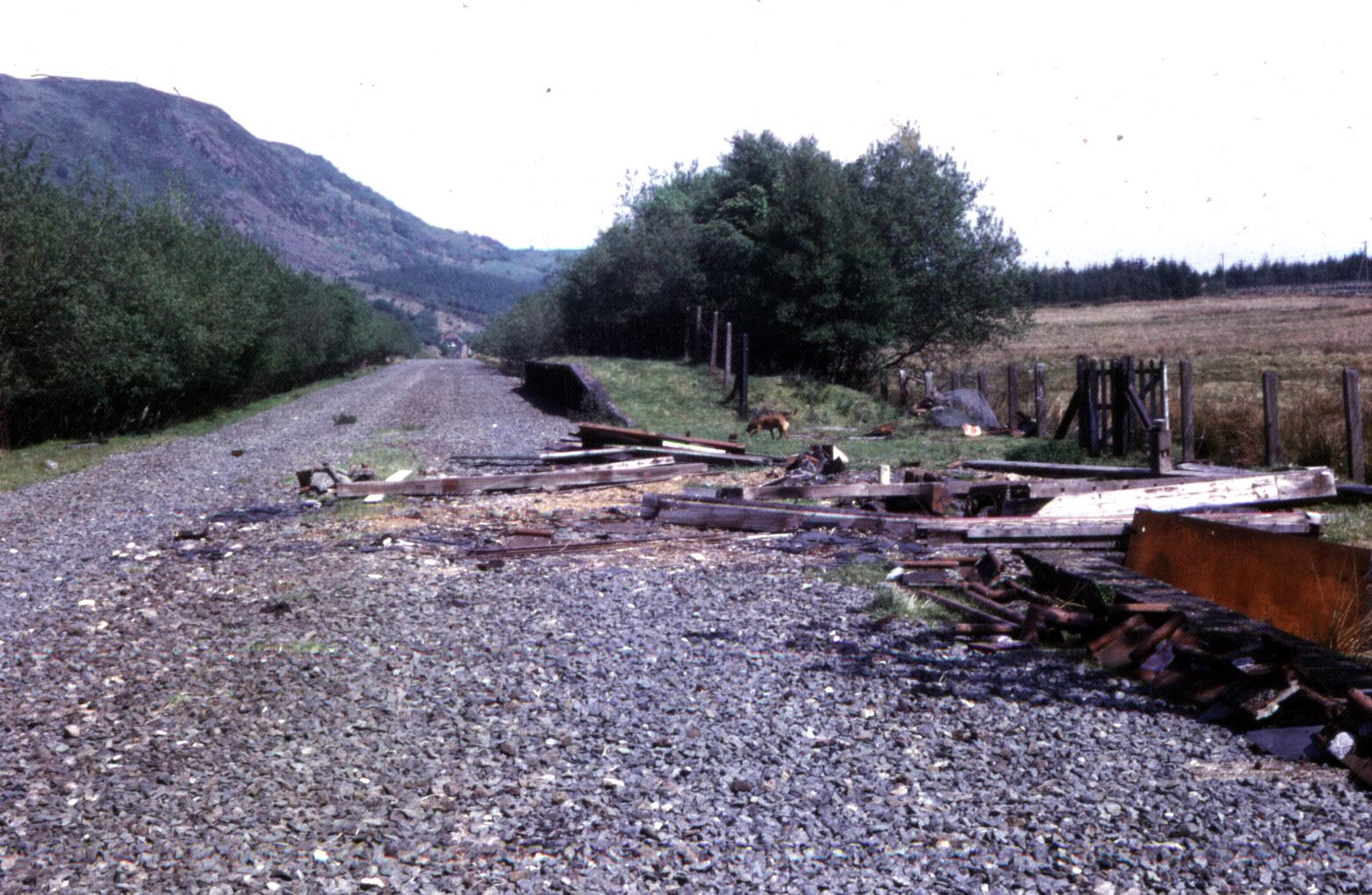
Looking East towards Ruabon showing the Down platform and demolished remains of the signal box. May 1975.

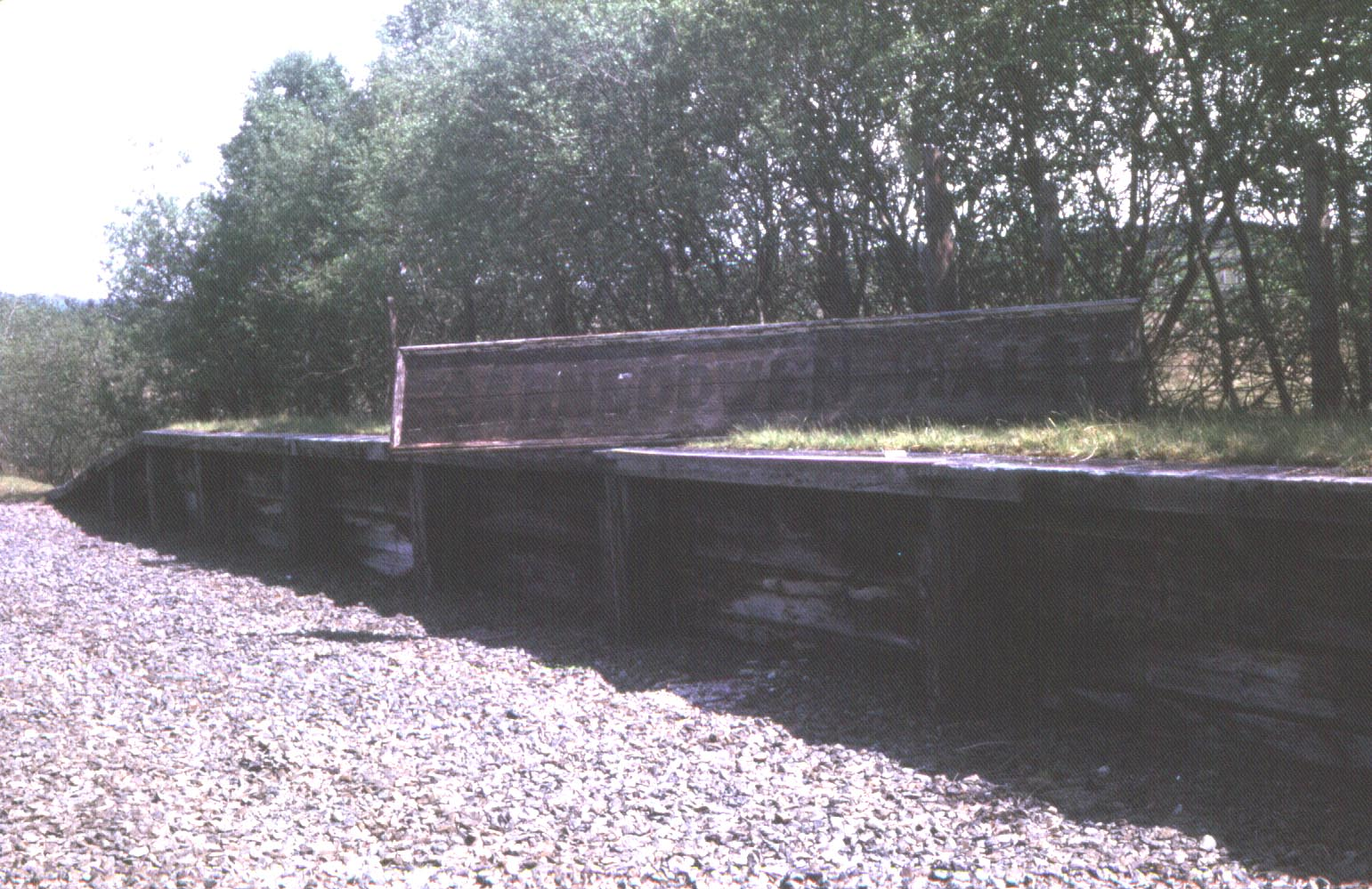
The Halt's nameboard on the Down platform. May 1975.

== Neighbouring stations ==
Preceding station	Disused railways	Following station
Drws-y-Nant; Line and station closed	Great Western Railway; Bala and Dolgelly Railway	Llys Halt; Line and station closed
