= Drws-y-Nant railway station =

Disused railway station in Gwynedd, Wales

Coordinates: 52.7909°N 3.7551°W

Drws-y-Nant
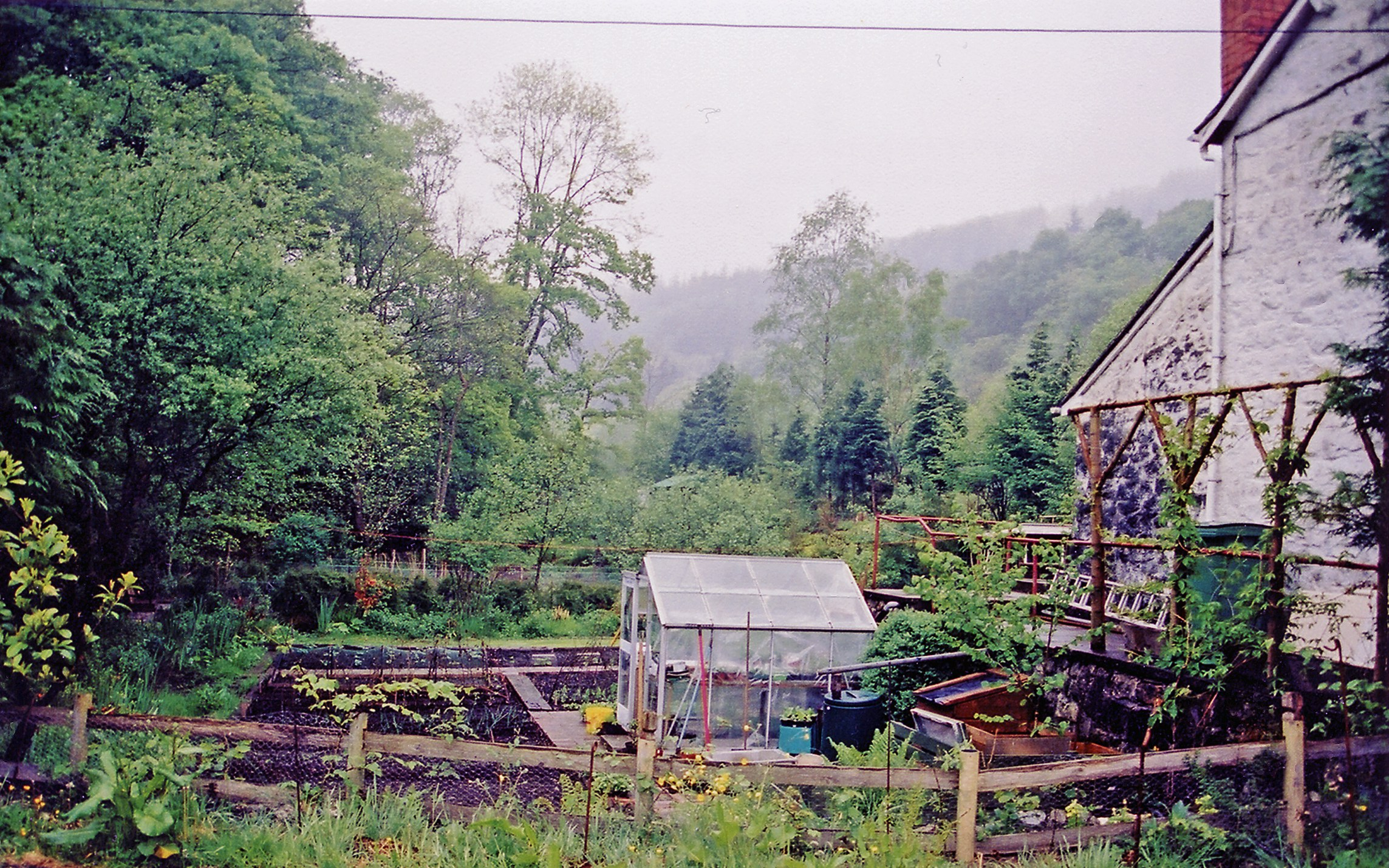
- The station cottage in 2001

General information
- Location: Drws-y-Nant, Gwynedd; Wales
- Platforms: 2

Other information
- Status: Disused

History
- Pre-grouping: Great Western Railway

Key dates
- 4 August 1868: Opened
- 18 Jan 1965: Closed to passengers
- 4 May 1964: Closed to goods
Location

Drws-y-Nant railway station (Pron: Droos-a-Nant) in Gwynedd, Wales, was formerly a station on the Ruabon to Barmouth line.

The station had two platforms with a passing loop, plus a small goods yard with a dock for loading livestock. According to the Official Handbook of Stations the following classes of traffic were being handled at this station in 1956: G, P, L & H and there was no crane.

Part of the station survives today with two whole platforms, and a nearby crossing cottage. The station is visible from the road near the line.

== Neighbouring stations ==
Preceding station	Disused railways	Following station
Wnion Halt; Line and station closed	Great Western Railway; Bala and Dolgelly Railway	Garneddwen Halt; Line and station closed
