= Bala Lake Railway =

Heritage railway line in Gwynedd, Wales

Coordinates: 52°52′48″N 3°37′34″W

Bala Lake Railway Rheilffordd Llyn Tegid
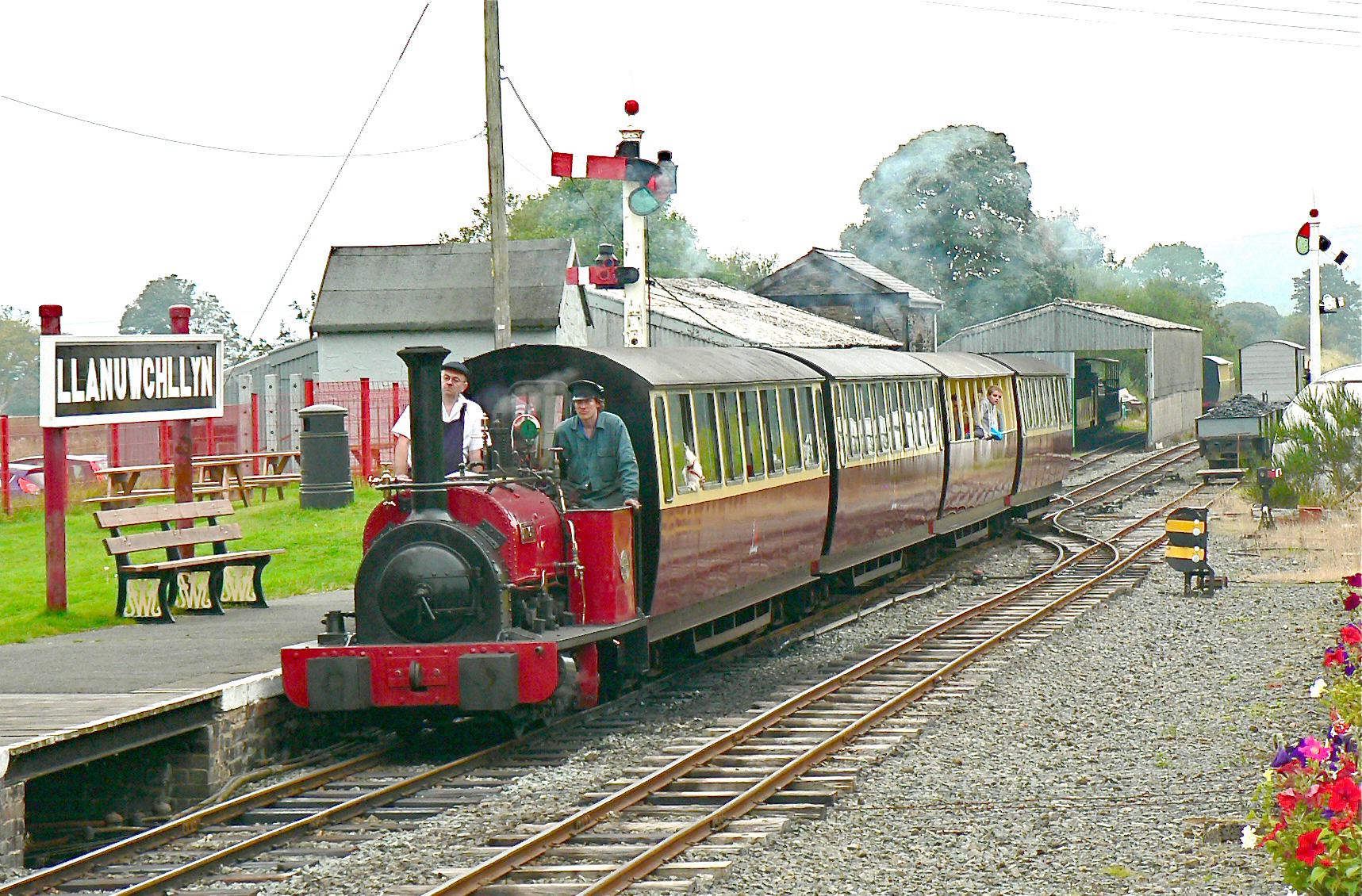
- Alice at Llanuwchllyn, 2014
- Locale: Wales
- Terminus: Llanuwchllyn

Commercial operations
- Name: Ruabon–Barmouth line
- Built by: GWR
- Original gauge: 4 ft 8 1/2 in (1,435 mm) standard gauge

Preserved operations
- Operated by: Rheilffordd Llyn Tegid Ltd
- Length: 4.5 miles (7.2 km)
- Preserved gauge: 1 ft 11 5/8 in (600 mm)

Commercial history
- Opened: Between 1 December 1861 and 10 October 1867
- Closed to passengers: 18 January 1965
- Closed: 1968

Preservation history
- Opened: 1972

The Bala Lake Railway (Welsh: Rheilffordd Llyn Tegid) is a narrow-gauge railway along the southern shore of Llyn Tegid (Bala Lake) in Gwynedd, North Wales. The line, which is 4 1/2 miles (7.2 km) long, is built on a section of the former standard-gauge Ruabon–Barmouth GWR route that closed in 1965. Another section of the former permanent way is used by the Llangollen Railway. The Bala Lake Railway, which runs on 600 mm (1 ft 11 5/8 in)-gauge preserved rolling stock, is a member of the Great Little Trains of Wales.

The railway now has the largest collection of historic narrow-gauge quarry locomotives built specifically for the slate industry in North Wales by the Hunslet Engine Company in Leeds.

== History ==
=== Standard Gauge ===
The narrow-gauge Bala Lake railway uses the permanent way of the former standard-gauge GWR Ruabon–Barmouth line. The railway, which opened in August 1868, was built by the Bala and Dolgelley Railway Company. Its original 19 mi (31 km) route ran between the Corwen & Bala Railway at Bala Junction and Cambrian Railways' station at Dolgellau. In 1877 it became part of the network operated by Great Western (GWR). In 1896 Llanuwchllyn was redeveloped with the addition of a passing loop and second platform, extended building and a new signal box.

Passenger services through Bala Junction ceased on Monday 18 January 1965 when the line from Llangollen to Barmouth was closed. Although originally earmarked for dieselisation by the Western Region of British Railways in the early 1960s, the Ruabon to Bala–Barmouth line was included in the 1963 Beeching Report. Traffic on the line was gradually reduced and facilities rationalised; the last scheduled through-rail service was the mail train from Chester in December 1964. Long-distance holiday charter trains and through freight traffic were diverted on to the Cambrian main line via Welshpool. Goods traffic finally ceased on 1 January 1968 when the branch at Pontcysyllte was closed.

=== Narrow gauge ===
By 1969 the track had been lifted. Reuse of the line as a narrow-gauge railway began when local engineer, George Barnes, saw the potential of the lakeside section for both local and tourist traffic. With the help of Tom Jones, then chairman of Merioneth County Council's Finance Committee, they established Rheilffordd Llyn Tegid Ltd, the first company in Wales to be registered exclusively in the Welsh language.

Bala Lake Railway opened on 13 August 1972. In its first season, it operated a small industrial diesel engine with two open carriages on 1 1/2 miles (2.4 km) of track between Llanuwchllyn and Pentrepiod. Extension work continued throughout this period with the help of local ex-British Rail employees. The line was extended to Llangower by the start of 1973. In 1975 the line reached a new temporary station at Pant-yr-hen-felin. The following year the line reached Bala (Llyn Tegid), now known as Bala (Penybont). On 6 July 1977 the remaining 2ft-foot-gauge rolling stock from the Long Eaton West Park Railway was relocated to the Bala Lake Railway. There were expansion plans to extend the line into Bala's town centre by 1981 but these plans were abandoned early in that year.

The canopy at Llanuwchllyn was built in 1979 with supports which were made for the Cambrian Railways station at Pwllheli, but were relocated to Aberdovey in 1907 when Pwllheli station was moved. The stations along the line are:

- Llanuwchllyn, includes the main buildings, cafe, workshops and railway offices.
- Pentrepiod Halt, an operational request stop.
- Glan Llyn Halt, a limited-use station, open only during the Halloween and Santa Special train services.
- Llangower, principal intermediate station that all trains stop at. It has a passing loop for two-train services.
- Bryn Hynod Halt, a request stop that closed in 2011 (platform demolished in February 2012).
- Bala (Penybont), terminus located near the town of Bala.

=== Llanuwchllyn Heritage Centre ===
The Llanuwchllyn Heritage Centre is a museum of Welsh narrow-gauge railway located at Llanuwchllyn railway station. It won the 2020 Railway Heritage Association award for Outstanding Visitor Attraction. Exhibits on display include Hunslet Engine Company locomotive Nesta and a replica of Lord Penrhyn's private carriage, both from the Penrhyn Quarry Railway. It also houses locomotives that are not currently in use which frees up spaces in the running shed and has a variety of exhibits relating to the quarry industry.

=== Developments and expansion ===
In 2010, the company revived plans to complete the final 0.75 miles (1.2 km) of the railway to Bala town centre. The Red Dragon Project, under the auspices of the Bala Lake Railway Trust, has been established to build the £2.5 million extension.

The plans also include: a new engine shed, a visitor centre, the rebuilding of the carriage shed, which was completed in 2019, and a new set of carriages.

In March 2017, the Trust announced that it had acquired land required in Bala for the new railway terminus. In October 2019, the Trust purchased land from Bala Rugby Club for the extension of the line. A further area of land adjacent to the new station site was acquired in 2022 and will be used for sidings.

Over the weekend of 12/13 June 2021 the event 'Bala Rerailed' was held on the site of the new station in Bala using Winifred and a Penrhyn coach to provide rides for the public.

A Bala Lake Railway trip

The preserved railway turned 50 in 2022 and staged a variety of events. These included: 'Bala at 50' over the May Day Bank Holiday, complete with the launch of a pictorial album "Bala Lake Railway, The First 50 Years, 1972 - 2022", and a celebratory beer; 'Aur Bala/Bala Gold' on 13 August; and a 'Gala' over August Bank Holiday.

== Rolling stock ==
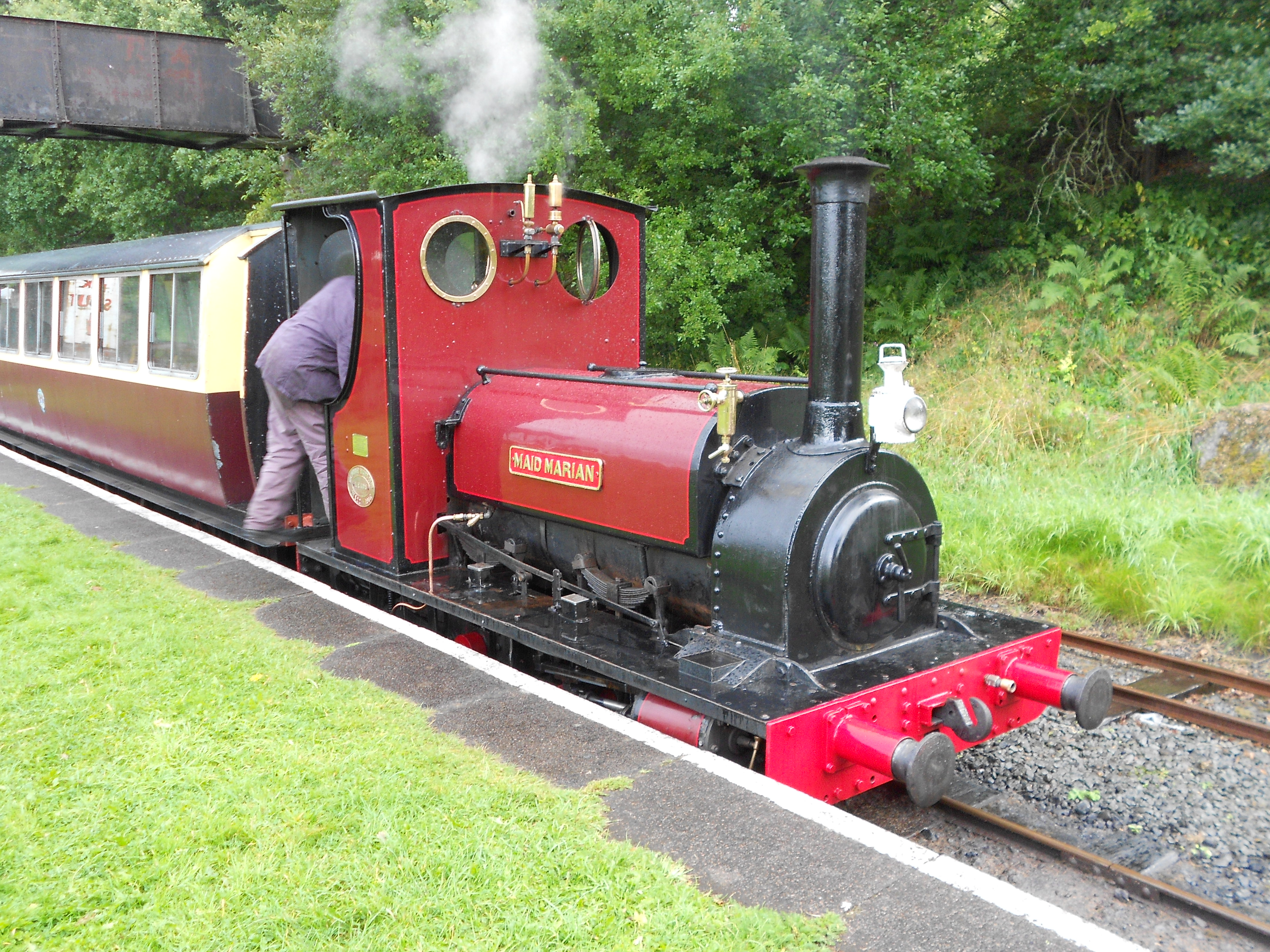
Maid Marian waiting with a train at Bala station in the rain.

Steam locomotives currently in use or stored on the line are:

- Maid Marian, works number 822 (in use). Arrived on the line 1975. It has twice undergone overhaul supported by her owners, the Maid Marian Locomotive Fund.
- Winifred, works number 364 (in use). Was repatriated to the UK from a warehouse at the Indianapolis Motor Speedway USA in April 2012. Was restored to working condition in 2015.
- George B, works number 680 (in use). Entered service in April 2017.

Most of the locos were built by the Hunslet Engine Company for the Dinorwic and Penrhyn Quarries. The numerous Hunslet slate quarry steam locomotives have led the railway to market itself as the home of the Hunslet.

Until late 2011, ex Southam Cement Works Peckett 'Triassic' was stored on the Bala Lake Railway, was relocated to the Statfold Barn Railway during the overhauls of Winifred and George B due to storage space issues, but returned in Summer 2016. Some locomotives can now be seen at other railways; Ashover, for example, is now at the Vale of Rheidol Railway.

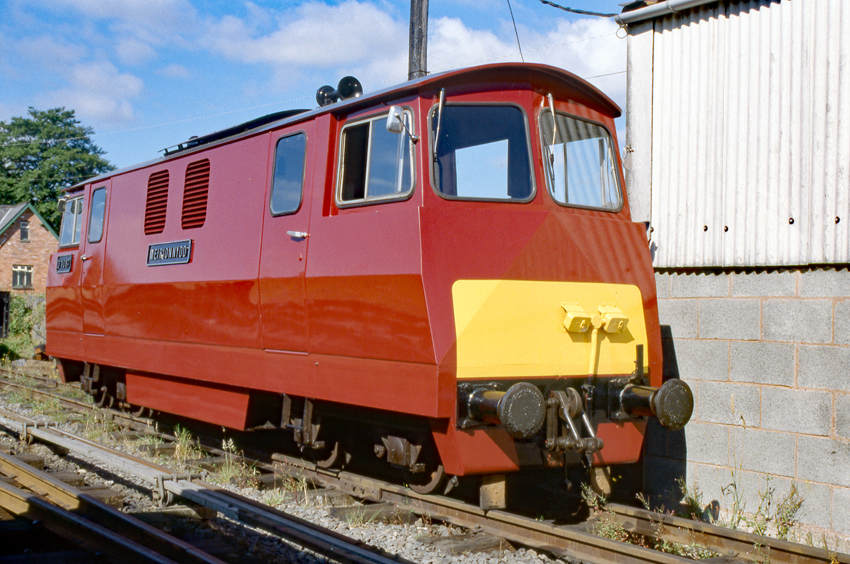
Meirionnydd Severn Lamb Bo-Bo diesel-hydrostatic loco

The four main diesel locomotives are:

- Meirionnydd, a Bo-Bo diesel-hydrostatic locomotive built by Severn Lamb of Stratford-upon-Avon in 1973, and based on a Western class standard-gauge locomotive outline.
- Trigger (Bob Davies), a Baguley Drewery, works no. 780, which is the railway's main standby diesel, used to haul out of season trains, for yard shunting and goods or works train haulage, which was built as 2 ft 6in gauge for the Royal Navy at Fishguard, purchased by Pete Briddon's Yorkshire Engine Company, regauged to 600mm gauge, and named 'Bob Davies' in honour of a remarkable local railwayman.
- Chilmark, Ruston & Hornsby, works no. 194771, the oldest of the railway's diesels (a 40DL diesel mechanical 3-speed built in 1939 for the Air Ministry), used by the Royal Air Force for hauling explosives and ammunition at RAF Chilmark, Wiltshire.
- Lady Madcap, a Ruston & Hornsby 20DL, which sees only occasional use for light shunting and ballast ploughing.

== See also ==
- British narrow-gauge railways
- Dinorwic Alice Class
