= Llanuwchllyn railway station =

Railway station in Gwynedd, Wales

Llanuwchllyn

General information
- Location: Llanuwchllyn, Gwynedd; Wales
- Coordinates: 52.855858°N 3.664221°W
- Grid reference: SH880300
- System: Station on heritage railway
- Manager: Bala Lake Railway
- Platforms: 2

Key dates
- 1868: Station opened
- 18 January 1965: Closed to passengers
- 4 May 1964: Closed to goods
- 14 Aug 1972: Reopened by Bala Lake Railway
Location

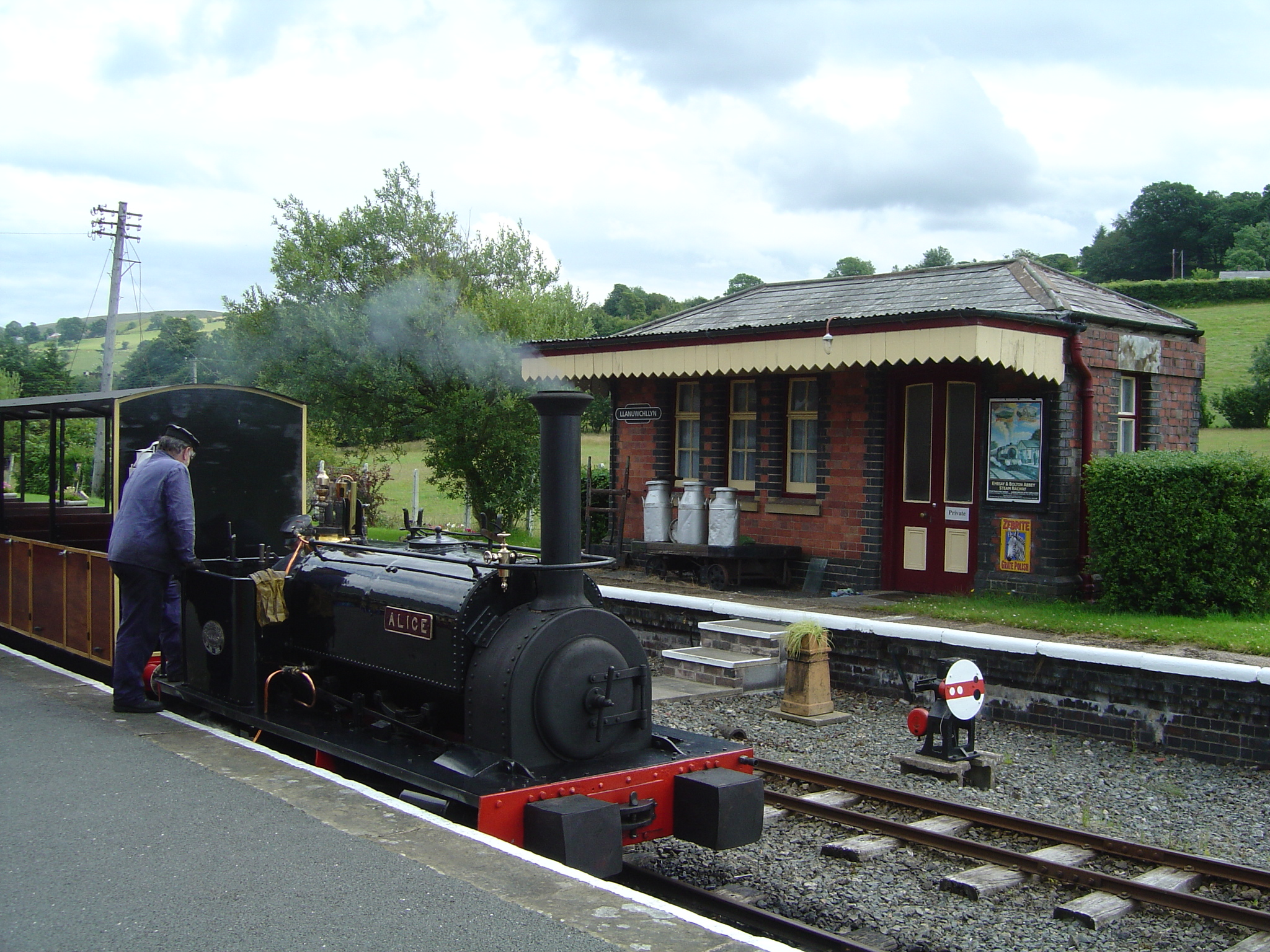
Llanuwchllyn station, now the terminus of the Bala Lake Railway, on 18 July 2004

Llanuwchllyn railway station (Welsh pronunciation: [ɬaˈnɨuχɬɨn]) in the village of Llanuwchllyn, Gwynedd, Wales, was formerly a station on the Ruabon to Barmouth line. It closed to passengers on Monday 18 January 1965 at the same time as the rest of the line, but subsequently reopened in 1972 as the southern (and main) terminus of the narrow gauge Bala Lake Railway. The station had a signal box and was a passing place on the single line.

The station buffet was the original waiting room, and the seating section was once a waiting room at Barmouth Junction. The main building has been extended on the site of the old toilets to provide a booking office and store room.

The canopy supports were built for the Cambrian Railways station at Pwllheli, but were taken down in 1907. Following use at Aberdovey until 1979, they were moved to Llanuwchllyn.

The cattle dock is now the picnic area, the stone goods shed is a woodworking shop and the waiting room on platform two is an office. The original signal box remains.

According to the Official Handbook of Stations the following classes of traffic were being handled at this station in 1956: Goods traffic, Passengers and Parcels traffic, Vans and Machines on road wheels by Goods train, Live Stock, Horse Boxes, and Cars and road carriages by Passenger train; and there was a 1-ton 10-cwt crane.

== Neighbouring stations ==
| Preceding station | Heritage railways | Following station |
|---|---|---|
| Terminus | Bala Lake Railway | Pentrepiod Halt towards Bala (Penybont) |
Disused railways
| Llys Halt | Great Western Railway; Ruabon Barmouth Line | Glan Llyn Halt |
