= Ruabon–Barmouth line =

Railway line in Wales

The Ruabon–Barmouth line was a standard-gauge line owned by the Great Western Railway across the north of Wales which connected Ruabon, in the east, with Barmouth on the west coast.

== History ==
Bala and Dolgelly Railway Act 1862
- Act of Parliament
- Parliament of the United Kingdom
- Long title: An Act to authorize the Construction of a Railway from Bala to Dolgelly in the County of Merioneth; and for other Purposes.
- Citation: 25 & 26 Vict. c. cix

Dates
- Royal assent: 30 June 1862

Text of statute as originally enacted

Corwen and Bala Railway Act 1862
- Act of Parliament
- Parliament of the United Kingdom
- Long title: An Act for making a Railway from Corwen to Bala, and for other Purposes.
- Citation: 25 & 26 Vict. c. cx

Dates
- Royal assent: 30 June 1862

Text of statute as originally enacted

Bala and Dolgelley Railway Act 1863
- Act of Parliament
- Parliament of the United Kingdom
- Long title: An Act to enable the Bala and Dolgelley Railway Company to construct additional Works at Dolgelley in the County of Merioneth; to amend the Acts relating to the Company; and to authorize certain Arrangements with the Aberystwith and Welsh Coast Railway Company; and for other Purposes.
- Citation: 26 & 27 Vict. c. clxxix

Dates
- Royal assent: 21 July 1863

[1863 Text of statute as originally enacted]

Corwen and Bala Railway Act 1865
- Act of Parliament
- Parliament of the United Kingdom
- Long title: An Act for authorizing an Extension of the Corwen and Bala Railway; for abandoning Portions of the Corwen and Bala and Bala and Dolgelly Railways; and for other Purposes.
- Citation: 28 & 29 Vict. c. lxxxi

Dates
- Royal assent: 19 June 1865

Text of statute as originally enacted

The line opened in stages by various companies:

- Vale of Llangollen Railway – 1 December 1861 (goods); 2 June 1862 (passenger)
- Llangollen and Corwen Railway – 1 May 1865. This section of the line had gained royal assent in 1860.
- Corwen and Bala Railway – 16 July 1866 (Corwen to Llandrillo); 1 April 1868 (Llandrillo to Bala).
- Bala and Dolgelly Railway – 4 August 1868.
- Aberystwith and Welsh Coast Railway – 10 October 1867

The Aberystwith and Welsh Coast Railway was absorbed by the Cambrian Railways by the Cambrian and Coast Railways (Amalgamation) Act 1865 (28 & 29 Vict. c. ccxci). The Cambrian Railways amalgamated with the Great Western Railway (GWR) on 1 January 1922 as a result of the Railways Act 1921.

The Bala and Dolgelly Railway was absorbed into the GWR by the Great Western Railway Act 1877 (40 & 41 Vict. c. cx).

The Vale of Llangollen Railway, the Llangollen and Corwen Railway, and the Corwen and Bala Railway were absorbed into the GWR by the Great Western Railway (Additional Powers) Act 1896 (59 & 60 Vict. c. ccxxxii).

The line was double track from Ruabon (Llangollen Junction) to Llangollen Goods Yard. From there it was single line with passing loops at the following stations: Deeside Halt, Glyndyfrdwy, Carrog, Corwen, Llandrillo, Llandderfel, Bala Junction, Llanuwchllyn, Garneddwen Halt, Drws-y-Nant, Bont Newydd, Dolgellau and Penmaenpool.

=== Connections ===
- At Ruabon, the line connected with the Shrewsbury–Chester line (part of the GWR mainline from London Paddington to Birkenhead Woodside).
- At Trevor an incline ran to the Monsanto works. This also connected to the Pontcysyllte Branch, which eventually rejoined the main line near Wrexham.
- At Corwen the line connected with the Denbigh, Ruthin and Corwen Railway line.
- At Bala Junction the line connected with the Bala and Festiniog Railway.
- At Barmouth Junction, the line connected with the Cambrian Coast Line, which was owned by the Aberystwith and Welsh Coast Railway.

== Closure ==
The whole line was listed for closure as part of the Beeching Axe. Goods services between Morfa Mawddach (formerly Barmouth Junction) and Llangollen ceased in 1964. Although the whole line was planned to close for passenger services on 18 January 1965, services were suspended on 12 December 1964 following flooding. The section between Ruabon and Llangollen was subsequently reopened on 17 December for passenger trains until 18 January after which only freight services ran until 1968 when the line was closed completely. The section between Llangollen and Bala Junction was abandoned following flooding although a substitute bus service served the stations until 18 January 1965. The section Dolgellau to Morfa Mawddach reopened on 14 December and the section between Bala, Bala Junction and Dolgellau was reopened on 17 December. The whole route closed on 18 January 1965.

Lifting of the track was completed in 1969.

== Preservation ==
Two stretches of the line have long been reopened as preserved railways; the narrow-gauge Bala Lake Railway in 1972; and the standard-gauge Llangollen Railway which first opened to passengers in 1981.

A 10 miles (16 km) section between Barmouth Junction and Dolgellau is used as the Mawddach Trail, a cycle route and bridleway, conversion of which was assisted in 1976 when heavy floods washed away most of the remaining ballast.

Several sections have been used for road improvement schemes, including a 1 1/2-mile (2.4 km) section through Dolgellau, and the station site and trackbed west of Drws-y-Nant. The trackbed has also been redeveloped at the west end of Corwen and a number of houses and apartments have been built immediately east of Llangollen. Infringements occur between Llangollen and Acrefair (typically garden extensions and outbuildings) and the cutting through Cefn Mawr is partially blocked following land slips. At the end of Llanuwchllyn station, a house straddles the trackbed. In the countryside between these sites the trackbed remains disused although some sections are used for grazing cattle.

In 2020, a group was formed with the aim of reopening the section from Bala to Llandrillo as a greenway.

== Citations ==
=== Sources ===
- Awdry, Christopher (1990). Encyclopaedia of British Railway Companies. Sparkford: Patrick Stephens Ltd. ISBN 1-8526-0049-7. OCLC 19514063. CN 8983.
- Jowett, Alan (March 1989). Jowett's Railway Atlas of Great Britain and Ireland: From Pre-Grouping to the Present Day (1st ed.). Sparkford: Patrick Stephens Ltd. ISBN 978-1-85260-086-0. OCLC 22311137.
- The Llangollen Line – Ruabon to Barmouth, by W G Rear & N Jones. ISBN 1-870119-10-X
- Dickinson, Peter (2018). The Ruabon to Barmouth Line. Toadsmoor Road, Brimscombe, Stroud: Fonthill Media. ISBN 9781781552148
- Railway Walks: Exploring Disused Railways, by Gareth Lovett Jones. ISBN 0-7153-8543-7
- RAILSCOT on Vale of Llangollen Railway
- RAILSCOT on Llangollen and Corwen Railway
- RAILSCOT on Corwen and Bala Railway
- RAILSCOT on Bala and Dolgelly Railway
- RAILSCOT on Aberystwith and Welsh Coast Railway
- Llangollen Railway site, including a detailed history of the whole line
- Gwynedd Council – Recreational Routes – Mawddach Trail
