= Berwyn railway station =

Railway station in Denbighshire, Wales

Berwyn
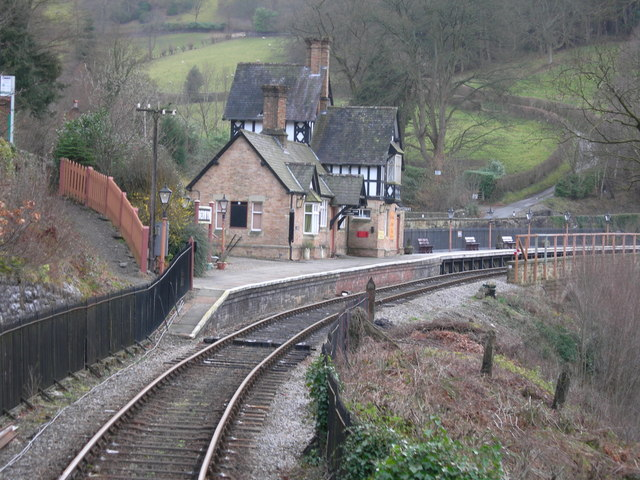
- Berwyn railway station in 2006.

General information
- Location: Berwyn, Denbighshire; Wales
- Coordinates: 52.97948°N 3.19544°W
- Grid reference: SJ198431
- System: Station on heritage railway
- Operator: Llangollen Railway
- Platforms: 1

History
- Original company: Llangollen and Corwen Railway
- Pre-grouping: Great Western Railway

Key dates
- 1 May 1865: Opened as Berwyn
- 20 September 1954: Renamed Berwyn Halt
- 14 December 1964: Closed
- March 1986: reopened

Listed Building – Grade II
- Feature: Berwyn Railway Station
- Designated: 22 December 1989
- Reference no.: 1234
Location

Berwyn railway station in Denbighshire, Wales, is a railway station on the former cross-country line between Ruabon and Barmouth. The station, which opened in May 1865, was a stop on the Great Western Railway (GWR) line between Llangollen and Corwen. It remained open for almost a hundred years, and it was due to be closed to passengers on Monday 18 January 1965. However, it was closed prematurely due to flood damage on 14 December 1964.

In 1986 the station was reopened as part of the heritage Llangollen Railway. It is now reportedly one of the best 10 stations to visit in Britain.

== History ==
The Llangollen to Corwen railway was opened in 1865. The route was constructed by Thomas Brassey under the direction of the prolific Scottish engineer, Henry Robertson. Berwyn was the first stop for westbound trains after Llangollen. Although today's station is located within a wooded gorge with only few houses and a riverside hotel nearby, it was at the centre of a vibrant community including a post office and Methodist chapel in the Victorian period. However, it was the local gentry who were the main reason for the station's existence. The chairman of the Llangollen and Corwen Railway lived just up the road at Plas Berwyn and an 1861 agreement announced:

A station to be called The Berwyn Station shall be built in ornamental style and contain a first class waiting room in addition to the general waiting room. All passenger trains shall stop at Berwyn if and when required by the owner or occupier of, or visitors to, Plas Berwyn mansion.

Berwyn station was built with a single right-handed curved side platform, station master's house, waiting room and booking office. As the station was too remote to be supplied by coal gas, its interiors were decorated with elaborate oil and paraffin lamps.

As milk was an important part of the local economy, it was regularly put on to trains at Berwyn. Local farms would bring milk to the station in tall, heavy conical metal churns (generally with a capacity of 17 imp gal (77 L; 20 US gal)). Two side handles allowed two men to lift the churns into a goods van. They could be rolled along on their bottom rims by one man, making a distinctive rattling noise. Milk churns would arrive at Berwyn every day from the nearby farms at Llantysilio for transport to the creamery at Corwen.

During the First World War, local teenage conscripts wrote their names and messages in indelible pencil on the wall of a pedestrian tunnel beneath Berwyn station in 1915. They did this shortly before boarding trains that would take them to their battalions. In 2007, research was undertaken to find out who they were. At least one young man is known to have died on the Western Front, and his name is now on the Llangollen War memorial. Work is now underway to protect the surviving messages from water damage.

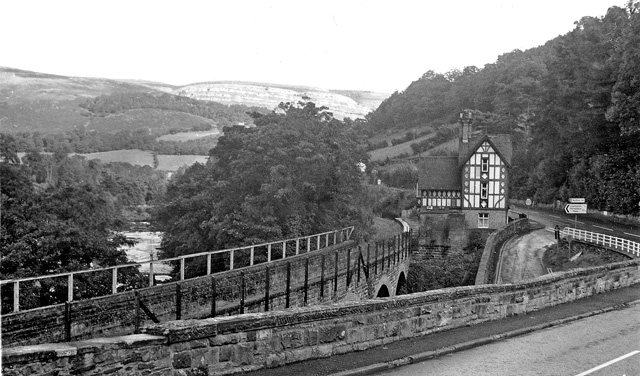
Berwyn station on the abandoned Ruabon–Barmouth line in September 1967

By the 1950s, the waiting room and booking office had both been closed as Berwyn had become an unstaffed halt. Although the station was planned to close in January 1965 the last passenger train ran on 12 December 1964 after which the line closed prematurely due to flooding. Goods traffic continued on the eastern section of line between Ruabon to Llangollen goods yard until 1968. After closure, the whole line was lifted. In the early 1970s, the Llangollen Railway Society was formed with the intention of reopening part of the line as a heritage railway.

By the 1980s, the newly relaid heritage line approached the former GWR station. Restoration work then began on the station dilapidated buildings. The first passenger train from Llangollen to return to Berwyn was a DMU on 19 October 1985. Steam hauled services began operating to Berwyn in December the same year. The station received a full passenger service in March 1986, with a formal opening ceremony being performed by the Duke of Westminster on 13 June 1986. As the station had become the western terminus of the new line, a run-round loop was installed just past the station.

== Berwyn Viaduct ==
The six-arch stone-built Berwyn Viaduct is a Grade II listed building directly to the west of the original station, and now forms part of the station as the platform extends over most of the viaduct's length. The viaduct lies between the River Dee and the A5 road. In addition to crossing a steep-sided valley it also forms a bridge over the B5103 (which crosses the Dee on another viaduct at a lower elevation) and the unnamed brook draining from the north side of Vivod mountain.

Berwyn station originally had a relatively short platform but with an increase in summer services in the early Edwardian period, the platform was extended across the viaduct with timber decking on wrought iron frames. This unusual cantilevered platform at the western end of the station was dismantled in the late 1950s due to its deterioration and a lack of passengers. In 2003 the Llangollen Railway decided to restore the platform at Berwyn to its original extended length across the viaduct which required significant repair work to restore the drainage system and platform supports. The work, which cost £353,000, was completed in March 2004. The platform restoration received a civil engineering award from the Institution of Civil Engineers.

== Preservation ==
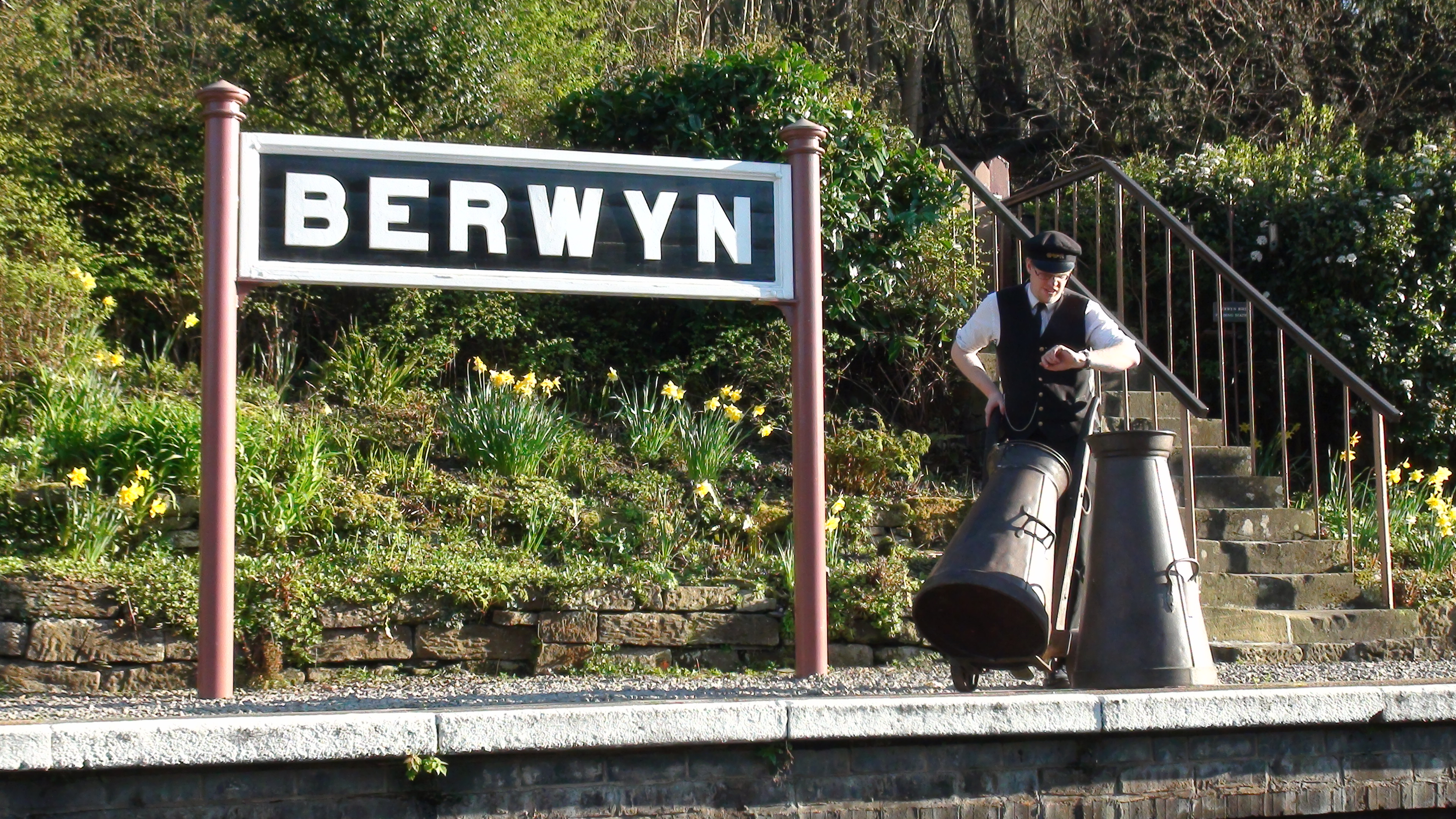
A volunteer member of station staff in heritage clothing

=== Booking office ===
The term booking office – still used today – is adopted from the old coaching practice of issuing tickets from a book. Originally these tickets on the early railways were handwritten and the process was very laborious. In 1837 a station master and trained cabinet maker named Thomas Edmondson introduced the Edmondson railway ticket. These pre-printed tickets were all individually numbered and date-stamped by a machine upon issue. Special souvenir Edmondson tickets are still issued to passengers from Berwyn's booking office in the traditional way.

=== Waiting room ===
The station's tea room is located within the former first class waiting room. During the Victorian period, the station boasted a separate waiting room for men and women travelling first class, with comfortable seats and a fire in winter. Those in the general waiting room had bench seats.

=== Station master's house ===
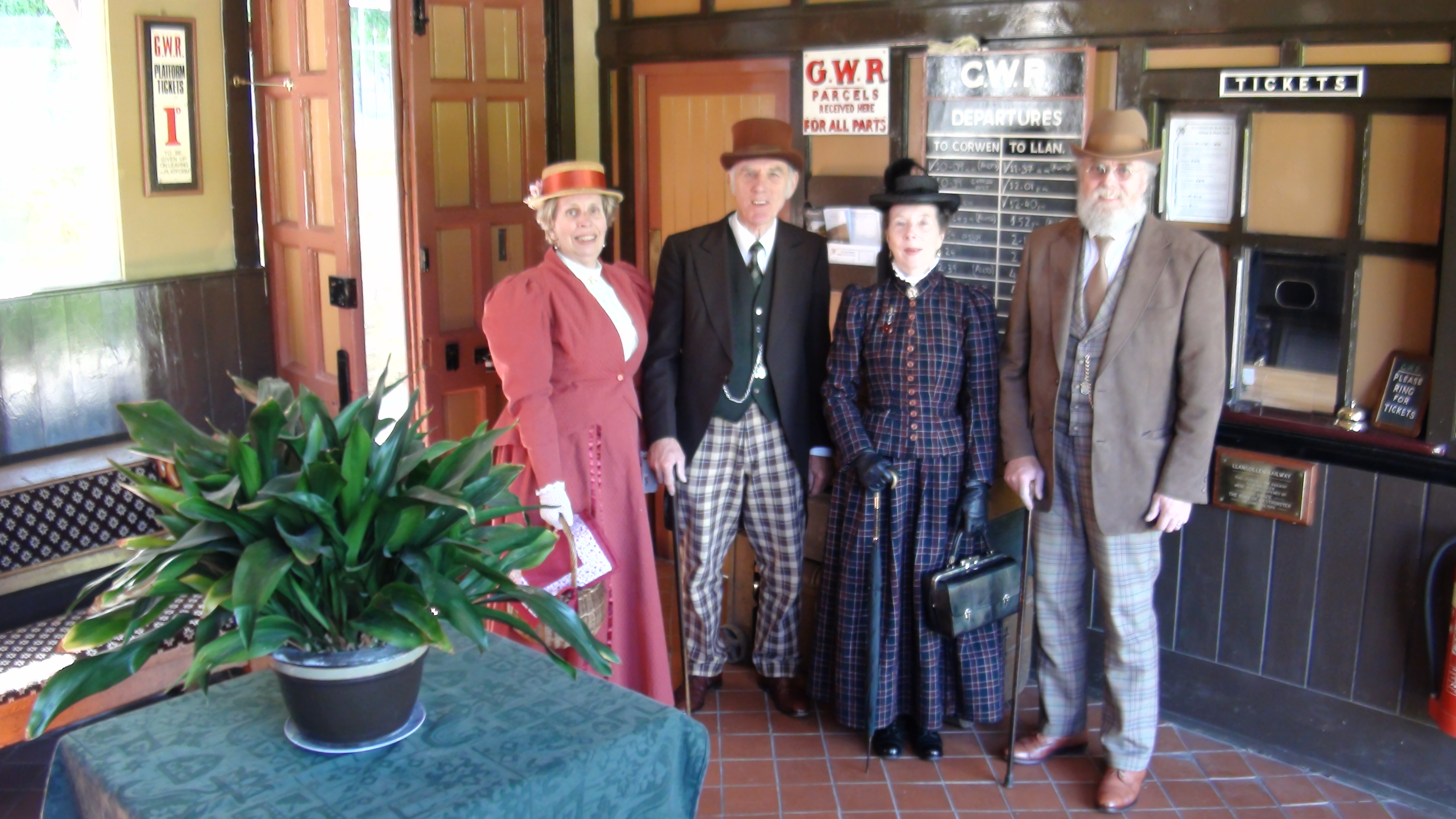
Victorian re-enactors inside the station's waiting room during the Llangollen Railway's Victorian Weekend

From 1865 until the mid-1950s, the station master was the key authority figure at Berwyn railway station, well-respected with significant local social standing. He sold tickets, handled parcels, tended to the station's coal fires and ensured passengers were safe. In his spare time, the station master also looked after the station's floral and vegetable gardens.

The station master's house is the mock-Tudor part of the Berwyn station building. Although the house came with the job, the station master had to pay rent to the GWR; in 1924 this cost 7 shillings and sixpence a week. The house has been restored and is now available to rent as a self-catered holiday cottage.

=== Platform ===
The platform has been extended back to its original length. This means that Berwyn can now accommodate 5-coach trains. However, due to the curve of the platform, a “Right Away” indicator has been installed at the western end of the station to enable a train guard to manage the train safely.

== Locale ==
=== Chain bridge ===
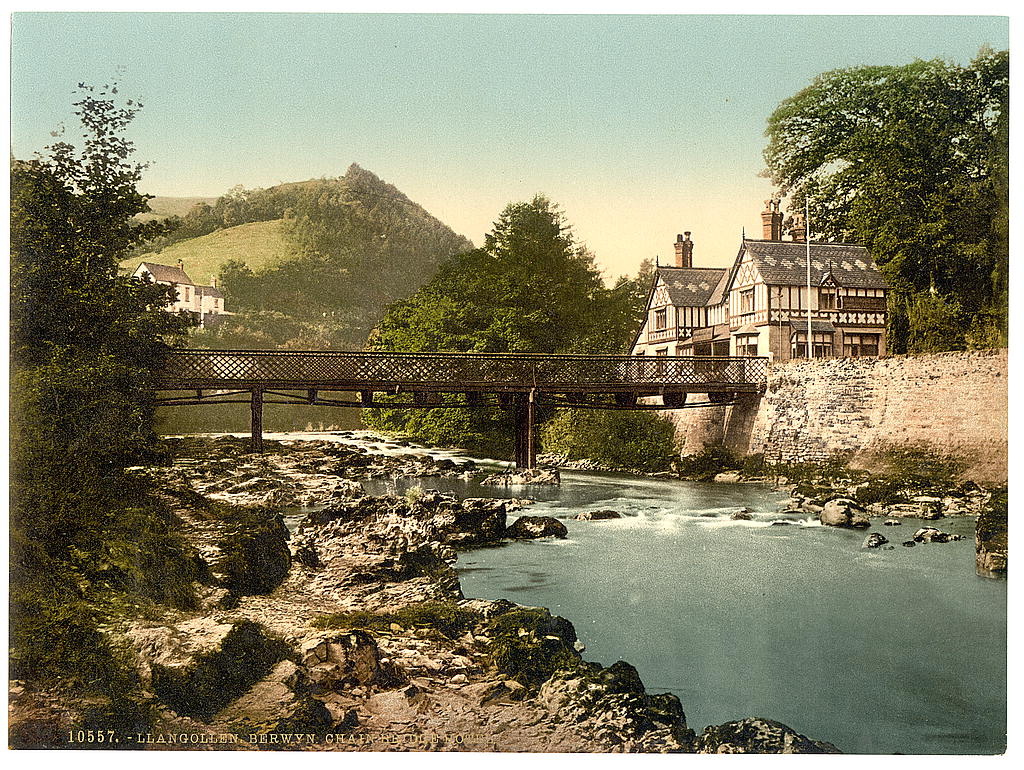
The second Chain Bridge across the River Dee

At the time of the railway's opening in 1865, the only way of crossing the River Dee at Berwyn was by using a chain bridge. There have been three such bridges. The first was built by mine owner Exuperius Pickering who needed to get his coal across the river to deliver it to Corwen and Bala. Permission for the bridge was granted in 1814 and it opened in 1817 or very soon afterwards.

In the 1870s, a replacement bridge was built by Henry Robertson (the railway's engineer) and this lasted until February 1928, when an exceptionally heavy flood washed it away. The surviving Chain Bridge was built in the summer of 1929, with six metal chains supporting the bridge deck from above and two chains supporting from below.

The bridge links two communities and is jointly owned by Llangollen Town Council and Llantysilio Community Council. A pathway from Berwyn station leads under a subway and down to the bridge and to the Chainbridge Hotel on the other side. After a lengthy period out of use and an extensive restoration, the bridge reopened in 2015.

=== Llangollen Canal and the Horseshoe Falls ===
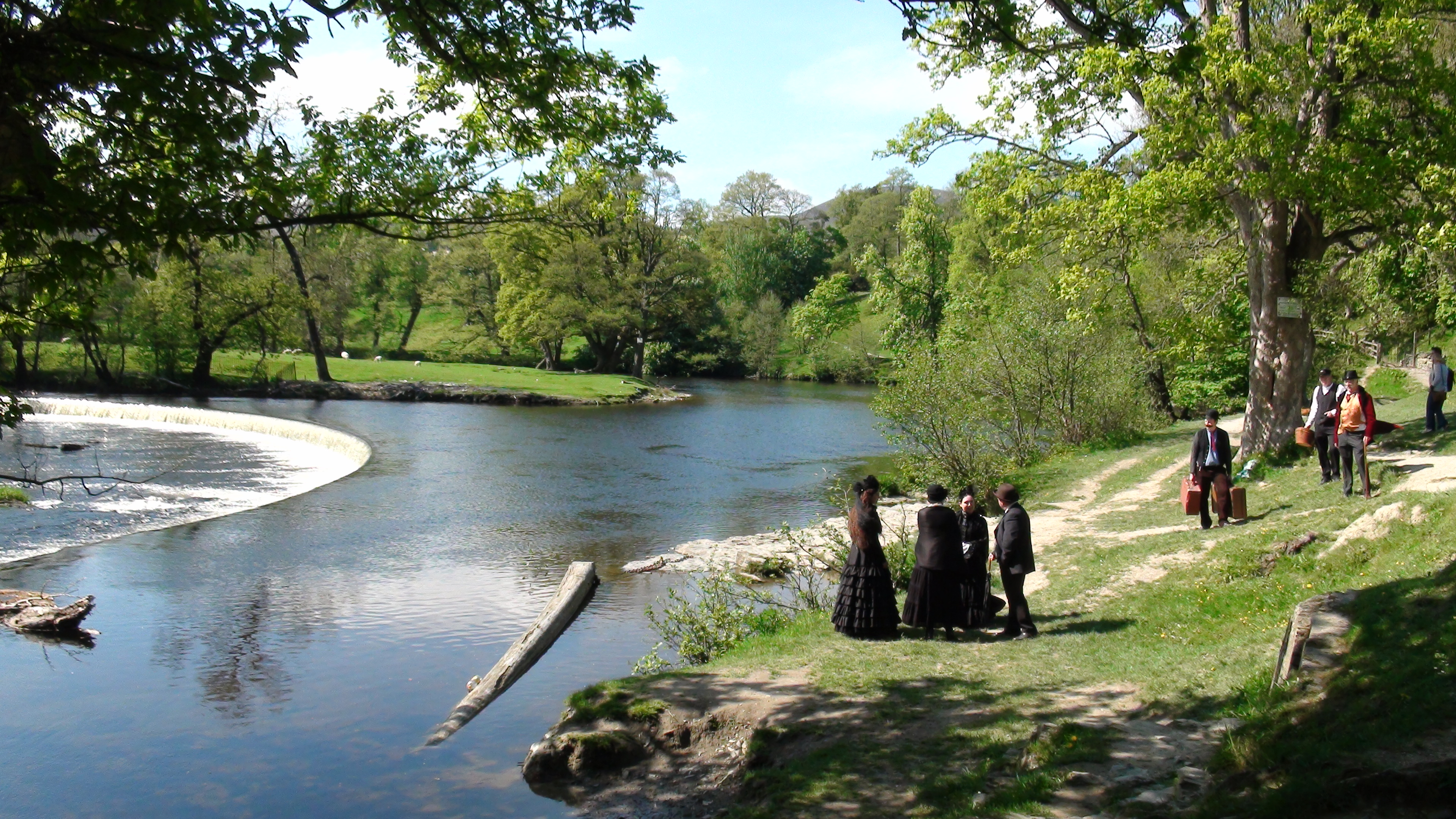
The tranquil Horseshoe Falls

The Llangollen Canal is located on the opposite side of the River Dee and accessible over the Chain Bridge (step-free access from the station platform). The Horseshoe Falls, built by Thomas Telford to act as a feeder for the Llangollen Canal, is a 10-minute walk from the station.

== Services ==
Preceding station	Heritage railways	Following station
Glyndyfrdwy towards Corwen	Llangollen Railway	Llangollen Terminus
Disused railways
Deeside Halt	Great Western Railway; Ruabon–Barmouth line	Llangollen
