= Carrog railway station =

Heritage railway station in Wales

Carrog
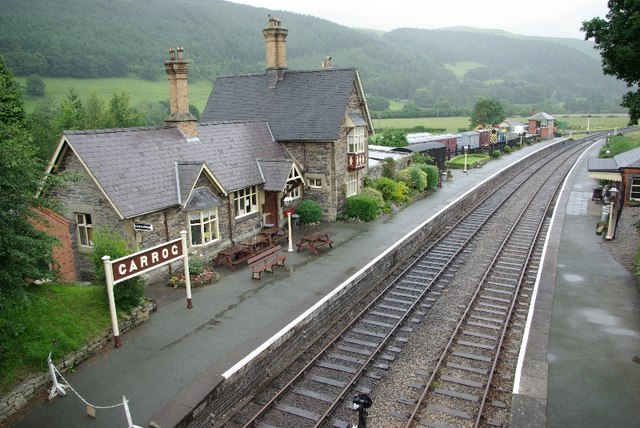

General information
- Location: Carrog, Denbighshire; Wales
- Coordinates: 52.9817°N 3.3155°W
- Grid reference: SJ117435
- System: Station on heritage railway
- Operator: Llangollen Railway
- Platforms: 2

History
- Original company: Llangollen and Corwen Railway
- Pre-grouping: Great Western Railway

Key dates
- 1 May 1865: Opened
- 4 May 1964: Closed to goods
- 14 Dec 1964: Closed to passengers
- 2 May 1996: Reopened
Location

Carrog railway station in Denbighshire, Wales, was formerly a station on the Ruabon to Barmouth line. A camping coach was positioned here by the Western Region from 1956 to 1962. It was to have closed to passengers on Monday 18 January 1965 but closed prematurely on 14 December 1964 due to flood damage. According to the Official Handbook of Stations the following classes of traffic were being handled at this station in 1956: G, P, F, L, H, C but there was no crane.

It was reopened in 1996 as part of the preserved Llangollen Railway. It is a passing place on the single line and has a signal box. On re-opening it became the terminus of the preserved line but became an intermediate station with the completion of the extension to Corwen East, in October 2014. Due to engineering works relating to the reopening of Corwen, Carrog again became the terminus of the line in 2019. It regained its intermediate status once again in June 2023 when the new Corwen station opened.

== Services ==
Preceding station	Heritage railways	Following station
Corwen Terminus	Llangollen Railway	Glyndyfrdwy towards Llangollen
Disused railways
Bonwm Halt	Great Western Railway; Ruabon Barmouth Line	Glyndyfrdwy

== Sources ==
- Butt, R. V. J. (October 1995). The Directory of Railway Stations: details every public and private passenger station, halt, platform and stopping place, past and present (1st ed.). Sparkford: Patrick Stephens Ltd. ISBN 978-1-85260-508-7. OCLC 60251199. OL 11956311M.
- McRae, Andrew (1998). British Railways Camping Coach Holidays: A Tour of Britain in the 1950s and 1960s. Vol. Scenes from the Past: 30 (Part Two). Foxline. ISBN 1-870119-53-3.
