= Glyndyfrdwy railway station =

Heritage railway station in Wales

Glyndyfrdwy
- Glyndyfrdwy station

General information
- Location: Glyndyfrdwy, Denbighshire; Wales
- Coordinates: 52.9762°N 3.2682°W
- Grid reference: SJ150429
- System: Station on heritage railway
- Operator: Llangollen Railway
- Platforms: 2

History
- Original company: Llangollen and Corwen Railway
- Pre-grouping: Great Western Railway

Key dates
- 1 May 1865: Opened
- 4 May 1964: Closed to goods
- 14 December 1964: Closed to passengers
- 1993: reopened
Location

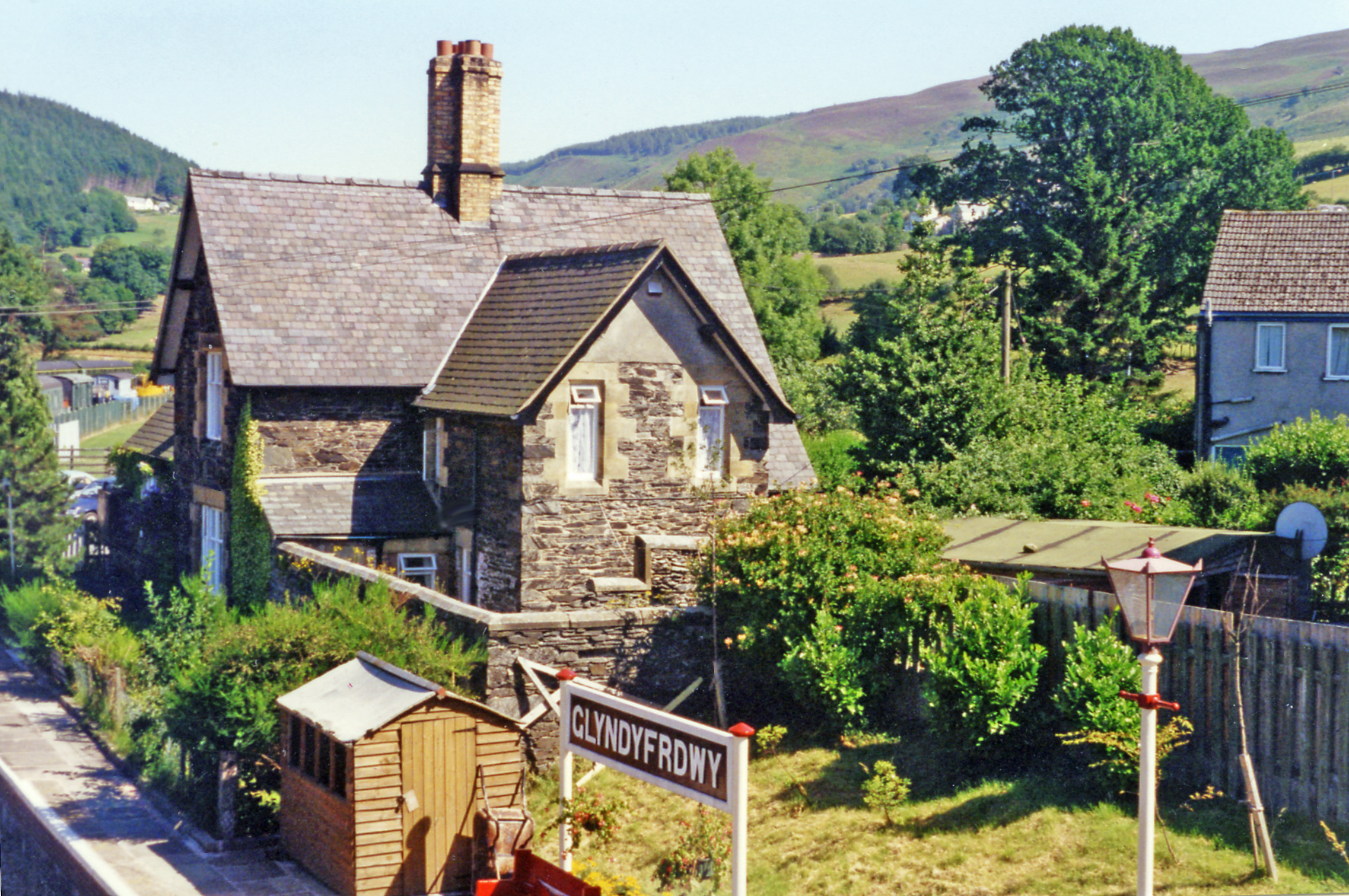
View eastward, towards Llangollen

View westward, towards Corwen, Bala and Barmouth

Glyndyfrdwy railway station (pronounced [ɡlɨnˈdəvrdʊɨ], Glin-duvver-doo-ee) is a former station on the Ruabon to Barmouth line near the village of Glyndyfrdwy in Denbighshire, Wales. It is now a preserved railway station on the Llangollen Railway, being reopened by the heritage railway in 1993.

== History ==
The station was originally opened in May 1865 by the Llangollen to Corwen railway company. The route was constructed by Thomas Brassey under the direction of the prolific Scottish engineer, Henry Robertson. Glyndyfrdwy was the third stop for westbound trains after Llangollen. According to the Official Handbook of Stations classes of traffic G, P & H were being handled at this station in 1956: and there was a 3-ton 10 cwt (3.6 tonne) crane. It remained open for almost a hundred years, and it was due to be closed to passengers on Monday 18 January 1965. However, it was closed prematurely due to flood damage on 14 December 1964.

== Preservation ==
It was reopened by the Llangollen Railway in 1993. The station has two side platforms alongside two tracks that provide a passing place on the single line. The restored non-operational signal box at the west end of the station is a listed structure from Barmouth South.

== Services ==
Preceding station	Heritage railways	Following station
Carrog towards Corwen	Llangollen Railway	Berwyn towards Llangollen
Disused railways
Carrog	Great Western Railway; Ruabon Barmouth Line	Deeside Halt
