= Cynwyd =

Cynwyd may refer to:

Places:

- Cynwyd, Denbighshire, in Wales
- Bala Cynwyd, or Cynwyd, a community in Lower Merion Township, Pennsylvania, USA

Transportation:

- Cynwyd Line, a SEPTA Regional Rail line in Pennsylvania
- Cynwyd station (SEPTA), a SEPTA Regional Rail station in Bala Cynwyd, Pennsylvania, USA
- Cynwyd railway station (Wales), a former railway station in Cynwyd, Denbighshire, Wales

Other:

- Cynwyd of Alt Clut, or Cinuit (6th century), possible ruler of Alt Clut in modern-day Scotland
- Cynwyd Forest Quarry, a protected area in Denbighshire, Wales
