= Carrog =

Village in Denbighshire, Wales

Coordinates: 52.982°N 3.323°W

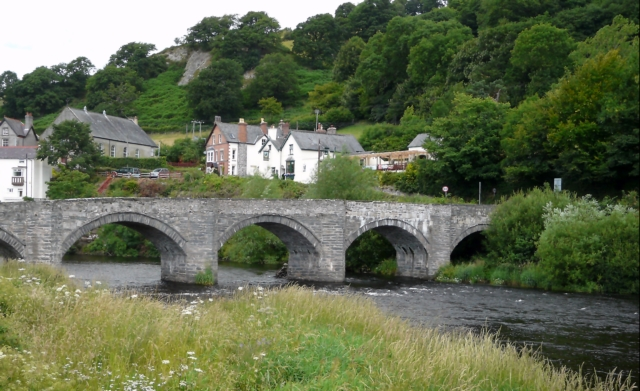
- Carrog

- Location within Denbighshire
- OS grid reference: SJ104437
- Community: Corwen
- Principal area: Denbighshire
- Country: Wales
- Sovereign state: United Kingdom
- Post town: CORWEN
- Postcode district: LL21
- Dialling code: 01490
- Police: North Wales
- Fire: North Wales
- Ambulance: Welsh
- UK Parliament: Dwyfor Meirionnydd
- Senedd Cymru – Welsh Parliament: Clwyd South

Carrog is a village in Denbighshire, Wales, near Corwen. Formerly referred to as Llansanffraid-Glyn Dyfrdwy, as it lies within the parish of Llansanffraid Glyndyfrdwy, it takes its modern name from the Great Western Railway station on the opposite bank of the River Dee, which in turn took its name (possibly to avoid confusion with the adjacent Glyn Dyfrdwy station and that in Llansanffraid Glan Conwy) from the Carrog estate on that bank. It is in the community of Corwen.

Carrog railway station is part of the Llangollen Railway and is a passing place on the line, now the extension to Corwen past the site of Bonwm has been opened. One notable resident of Carrog is Peredur Lynch who graduated from Bangor University to become a literary historian. Carrog has one primary school, Ysgol Carrog, which is over 100 years old.
