= Clawdd Poncen =

Village in Denbighshire, Wales

Coordinates: 52.9903°N 3.37959713°W

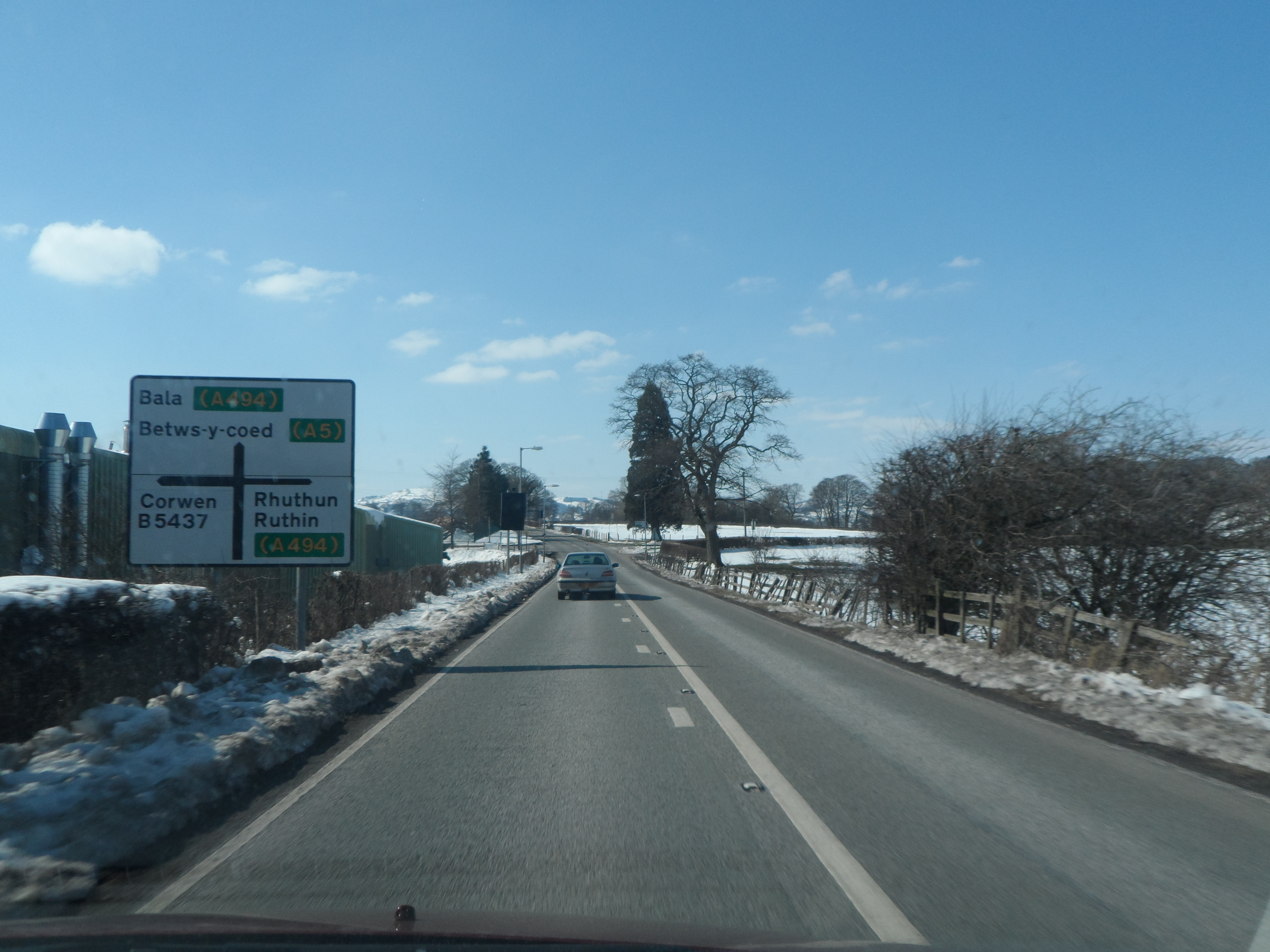
- Crossroads at Clawdd Poncen

- Location within Denbighshire
- Population: 300 (2011)
- OS grid reference: SJ07494455
  - Cardiff: 147 miles
- Community: Corwen
- Principal area: Denbighshire
- Preserved county: Clwyd
- Country: Wales
- Sovereign state: United Kingdom
- Post town: CORWEN
- Postcode district: LL21
- Dialling code: 01490
- Police: North Wales
- Fire: North Wales
- Ambulance: Welsh
- UK Parliament: Dwyfor Meirionnydd
- Senedd Cymru – Welsh Parliament: Clwyd South

Clawdd Poncen is a village in Denbighshire, Wales, approximately 1.3 miles (2.1 km) northwest of Corwen, on the opposite bank of the River Dee. The community population taken at the 2011 census was 300.

== Geography ==
Generally considered an outer suburb of nearby Corwen, the village is a mix of residential and industrial properties. The Ty'n y Llidiart industrial estate to the north of the village is home to the worldwide headquarters of Ifor Williams Trailers, a major manufacturer of trailers and horseboxes.

The industrial and residential areas of the village are separated by the B5437 road, which runs westbound to the A5104 crossroads for Ruthin and Llandegla, and eastbound towards Carrog.
