= Llansanffraid Glyndyfrdwy =

Former parish in Denbighshire, Wales

Coordinates: 52.98344°N 3.33558°W

- Afon Morwynion

- Location within Denbighshire
- OS grid reference: SJ1043
- Community: Corwen
- Principal area: Denbighshire
- Preserved county: Clwyd
- Country: Wales
- Sovereign state: United Kingdom
- Post town: CORWEN
- Postcode district: LL21
- Dialling code: 01490
- Police: North Wales
- Fire: North Wales
- Ambulance: Welsh
- UK Parliament: Dwyfor Meirionnydd
- Senedd Cymru – Welsh Parliament: Clwyd South

Llansanffraid Glyndyfrdwy is a former civil parish in the Edeirnion area of Denbighshire in Wales. Until 1974 it was part of Merionethshire, and was transferred to Glyndŵr District in Clwyd by the Local Government Act 1972. It became part of Denbighshire in 1996, and now forms part of the community of Corwen. It includes the village of Carrog.
