= Deeside and Moelfferna quarries =

Slate quarries in Denbighshire, Wales

Deeside and Moelfferna
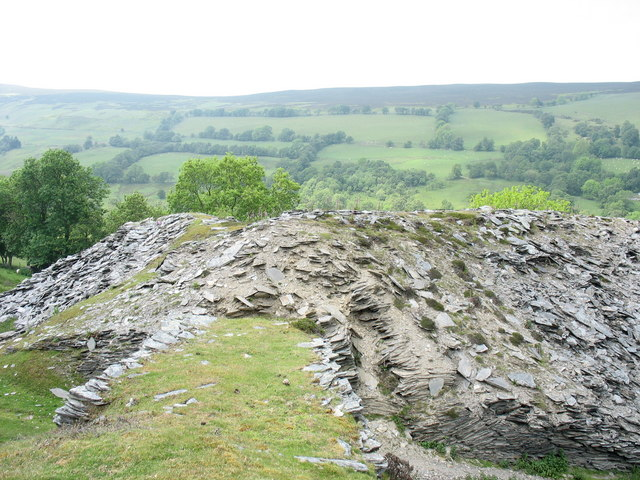
- Tipping tramway in Deeside quarry

- Location in Denbighshire

Location
- Location: near Glyndyfrdwy, Merionethshire (now Denbighshire), Wales; 52°57′08″N 3°17′30″W SJ 132 402

Production
- Products: Slate
- Type: Quarry

History
- Opened: 1870 (Deeside quarry); 1876 (Moelfferna quarry)
- Closed: 1947

Owner
- Railways

Technical
- Track gauge: 2 ft (610 mm) (in quarries); 2 ft 7 in (787 mm) (main)

The Deeside and Moelfferna quarries were neighbouring slate quarries, near Glyndyfrdwy in North Wales. They were both operated by the same company throughout their history, and were both connected by the Deeside Tramway to the Llangollen and Corwen Railway.

== History ==
=== Early working: 1870–1900 ===
The original owner of the Deeside quarry was the 1870 Dee Side Slate and Slab Quarry Ltd. The company was sold in 1875.

In 1876, the Moelferna and Dee Side Slate and Slab Quarries Company was formed to purchase both the Deeside quarry and the Moelfferna quarry.

In 1885, the quarries supplied a large slab cistern to the Guinness Brewery in Dublin. The tank measured 50 feet (15 m) by 8 feet (2.4 m) by 5 feet (1.5 m) and was believed to be one of the largest stone tank built at the time.

=== Accidents: 1900–1915 ===
In 1907 there was a serious accident at the quarry. Edward Rowlands was riding on a loaded slate wagon that was sent down from the Deeside quarry to the head of the incline down to Glyndyfrdwy. Rowlands was on the first wagon of a sequence of four, with the quarry manager Richard Roberts following in a second loaded wagon. The brake failed on the fourth wagon and it gathered speed; the quarryman leapt from the wagon and shouted a warning to the men ahead. The quarryman on the third wagon also jumped free, and the two out-of-control wagons collided with Robert's wagon. He jumped, but sustained serious injuries. The three wagons then hit Rowlands' wagon, derailing all four wagons and causing Rowlands fatal injuries to the lower body.

In 1915, two men, Robert Jones and John Lloyd, were crushed by an unexpected rockfall, weighing 100 tons, in the quarry.

=== Decline and closure: 1918–1947 ===
After the First World War, the chairman of the company was Percy Dean, who was the MP for Blackburn.

The Deeside quarry ceased working in the 1920s, but the Deeside slate works continued in production using slate from Moelfferna quarry. The enterprise closed in 1947.

== Transport ==
The 2 ft 6 in (762 mm) gauge Deeside Tramway connected the two quarries to the Deeside Slate Works and on down to the transhipment wharf at Glyndyfrdwy. The tramway originally ran between the slate works and Deeside quarry, before being extended in the late 1870s down to the wharf.

== Geology ==
Several beds of Ordovician shales and mudstones run across Mid Wales, from Tywyn in the south-west to Chirk in the north-east. At various points along this band, these sedimentary rocks have undergone compression and metamorphosis into slate.

The Pen-y-glog slate veins on the southern slopes of the Dee valley are worked by the quarries.
