= Cynwyd, Denbighshire =

Village in Denbighshire, Wales

Cynwyd
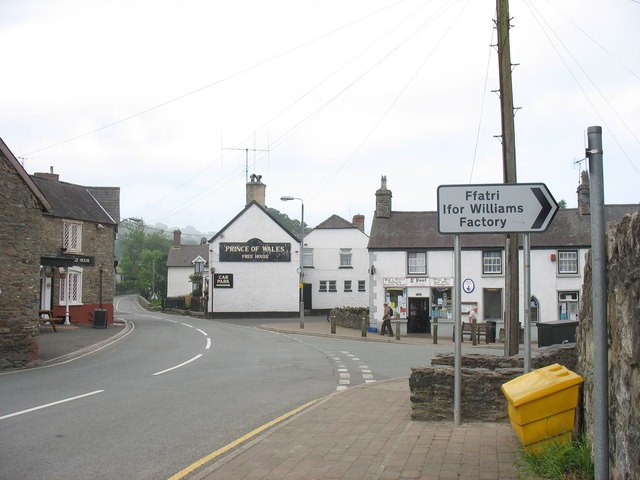
- The Square (Y Sgwar)

- Location within Denbighshire
- Population: 542 (2011)
- OS grid reference: SJ056411
- Community: Cynwyd
- Principal area: Denbighshire
- Preserved county: Clwyd
- Country: Wales
- Sovereign state: United Kingdom
- Post town: CORWEN
- Postcode district: LL21
- Dialling code: 01490
- Police: North Wales
- Fire: North Wales
- Ambulance: Welsh
- UK Parliament: Dwyfor Meirionnydd
- Senedd Cymru – Welsh Parliament: Clwyd South
- List of places UK Wales Denbighshire 52.959°N 3.406°W Map of the community

Cynwyd (Welsh pronunciation: [ˈkənwɨd]) is a small village and community in the Edeirnion area of Denbighshire in Wales, located about 2 miles (3 km) south west of the town of Corwen. It had a population of 528 in 2001, increasing to 542 at the census 2011, and is home to a large factory, run by Ifor Williams Trailers.

The Berwyn range can be reached from here.

Gwerclas Hall is situated approximately 1 mile (1.5 km) north-west of Cynwyd village. The present grade II* listed building dates mainly to 1767 and was built for Hugh Hughes Lloyd, replacing a house that had stood on the site for several hundred years. It was constructed in three storeys with a three-bay frontage and a central pedimented porch entrance. The Gwerclas estate became part of the Rhug estate in 1824 on the death of Richard Hughes until it was sold in 1972.

Cynwyd railway station was formerly a station on the Ruabon to Barmouth line; it closed to passengers on 18 January 1965.

== Schools ==
- Ysgol Bro Dyfrdwy is the local bilingual primary school.
