= Bonwm Halt railway station =

Disused railway station in Denbighshire, Wales

Coordinates: 52.98042°N 3.34310°W

Bonwm Halt

General information
- Location: Bonwm, Denbighshire; Wales
- Platforms: 1

Other information
- Status: Disused

History
- Original company: Great Western Railway

Key dates
- 21 Sept 1935: Opened
- 14 Dec 1964: Closed
Location

Bonwm Halt in Denbighshire, Wales, was a minor station on the Ruabon to Barmouth line.

Situated on the south side of the line alongside the A5, it was of timber construction and only about one carriage length long. It was to have closed to passengers on 18 January 1965 under the Beeching Axe but closed prematurely on 14 December 1964 due to flood damage.

There was a timber waiting shelter and a dual-sided nameboard so the halt's name could also be seen from the road. There was never a signal box, passing place nor freight facilities here. At that time, two trains per day stopped at the halt, conveying two boys to the Grammar School at Bala and returning them in the evening.

Today just a few wooden supports survive of the platform edge.

Work started in 2011 by the Llangollen Railway Preservation Society to rebuild the line between Carrog and Corwen. By 2013 the line had been relaid up to the site of Bonwm Halt, though there are no plans to rebuild the platform and shelter. By spring 2014 the relaying work had reached the outskirts of Corwen and in October 2014 the new station at Corwen East saw its first passengers.

On Saturday 22 June 2013 the first train to reach the former site of Bonwm Halt was former Arriva Bubble 121032 (55032) on loan for the DMU Gala Weekend from Chiltern. This means that Llangollen Rail managed to reach their goal ahead of schedule.

== Services ==
Preceding station	Disused railways	Following station
Corwen	Great Western Railway; Ruabon Barmouth Line	Carrog

== Sources ==
- Butt, R. V. J. (October 1995). The Directory of Railway Stations: details every public and private passenger station, halt, platform and stopping place, past and present (1st ed.). Sparkford: Patrick Stephens Ltd. ISBN 978-1-85260-508-7. OCLC 60251199. OL 11956311M.
