= Llandderfel railway station =

Former railway station in Gwynedd, Wales

Coordinates: 52.9169°N 3.5115°W

Llandderfel
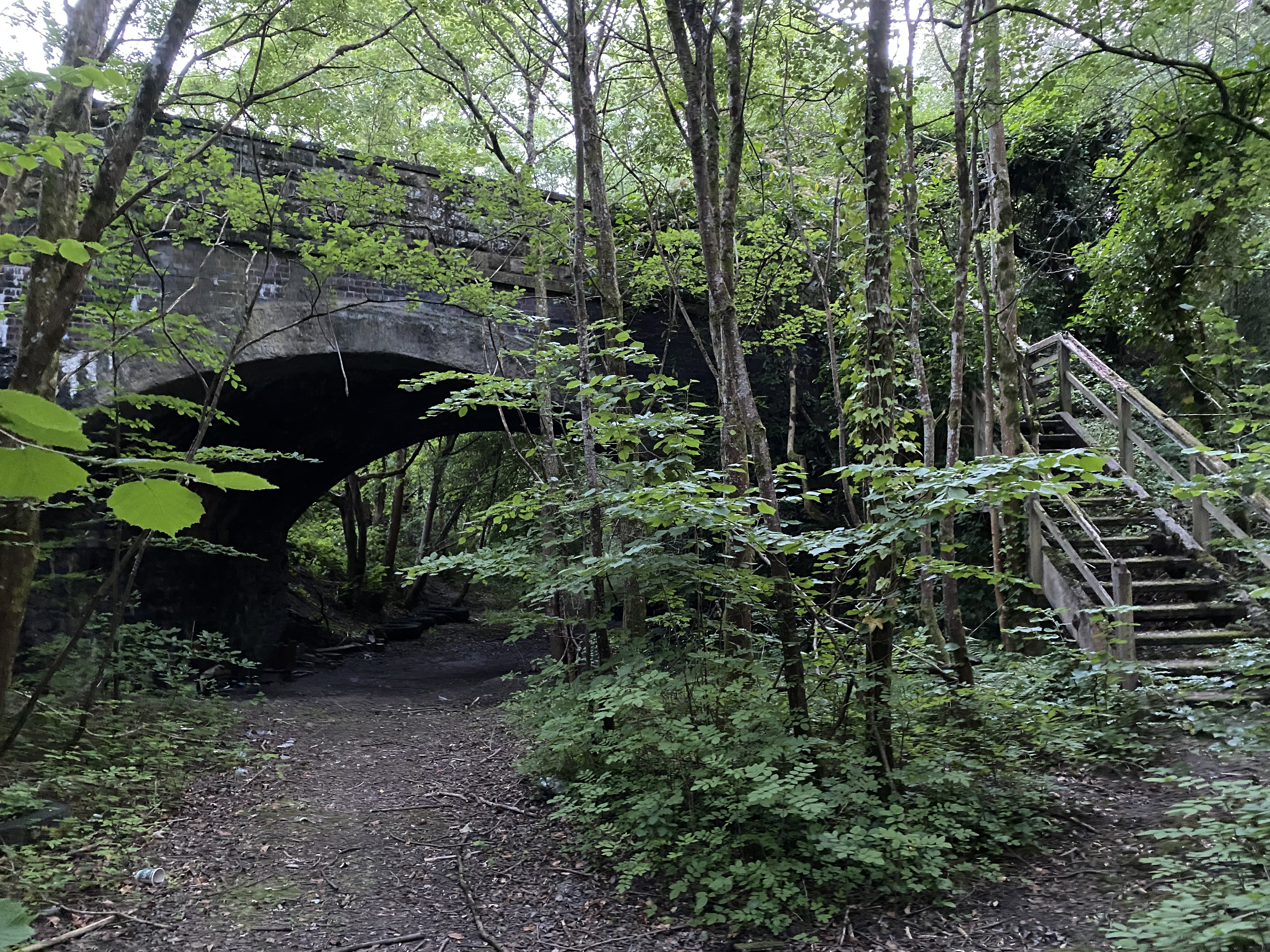
- The site of the station in 2022

General information
- Location: Llandderfel, Gwynedd; Wales
- Platforms: 2

Other information
- Status: Disused

History
- Pre-grouping: Great Western Railway

Key dates
- 1 Apr 1868: Opened
- 14 Dec 1964: Closed to passengers
- 4 May 1964: Closed to goods
Location

Llandderfel railway station in Gwynedd, Wales, was a station on the Ruabon to Barmouth line. It closed to passengers ahead of the scheduled closure date of Monday 18 January 1965 because of flooding by the River Dee which breached the line near Llandderfel on 14 December 1964. This section of the line was never re-opened. The station had a signal box and was a passing place on the single line. Today, no trace of the station buildings exist; however, the flight of steps that leads from the road overbridge down to where the platforms once were are still in situ, along with a small section of overgrown "up" platform a few yards up from the steps.

The steps take you beneath the B4401 where the arch of the railway bridge is still accessible. The old line is walkable but overgrown.

According to the Official Handbook of Stations the following classes of traffic were being handled at this station in 1956: G, P, F, L, H & C but there was no crane.

== Pale Hall ==
Llandderfel was the next station down the line from Llandrillo but was more notable since it was situated adjacent to Pale Hall, the one time home of Sir Henry Robertson, chairman of the original railway companies which built the line. Pale Hall had a telephone link with the signal box. On 27 August 1889 the station was visited by Queen Victoria who arrived in the Royal Train and was entertained at Pale Hall.

== Crogen Hall Halt ==
There was at one time a small unstaffed halt between Llandrillo and Llandderfel which did not feature in the public timetables. This was Crogen Hall Halt, a private station built for the benefit of residents of the nearby Crogen Hall which at one time was occupied by Brigadier Skaife. The halt was on the other side of the River Dee from Crogen Hall so access was via a ferry. The Halt was probably opened in the 1920s but closed again a decade later. The platform is still extant under vegetation.

== Llandderfel Tunnel ==
Midway between Llandderfel and Bala Junction the line passed through a rocky outcrop which resulted in the construction of a 76yd long Llandderfel Tunnel, which still exists today, but now disused.

== Neighbouring stations ==
Preceding station	Disused railways	Following station
Llandrillo	Great Western Railway; Ruabon Barmouth Line	Bala Junction
