= Glyndyfrdwy =

Village in Denbighshire, Wales

Coordinates: 52.975°N 3.267°W

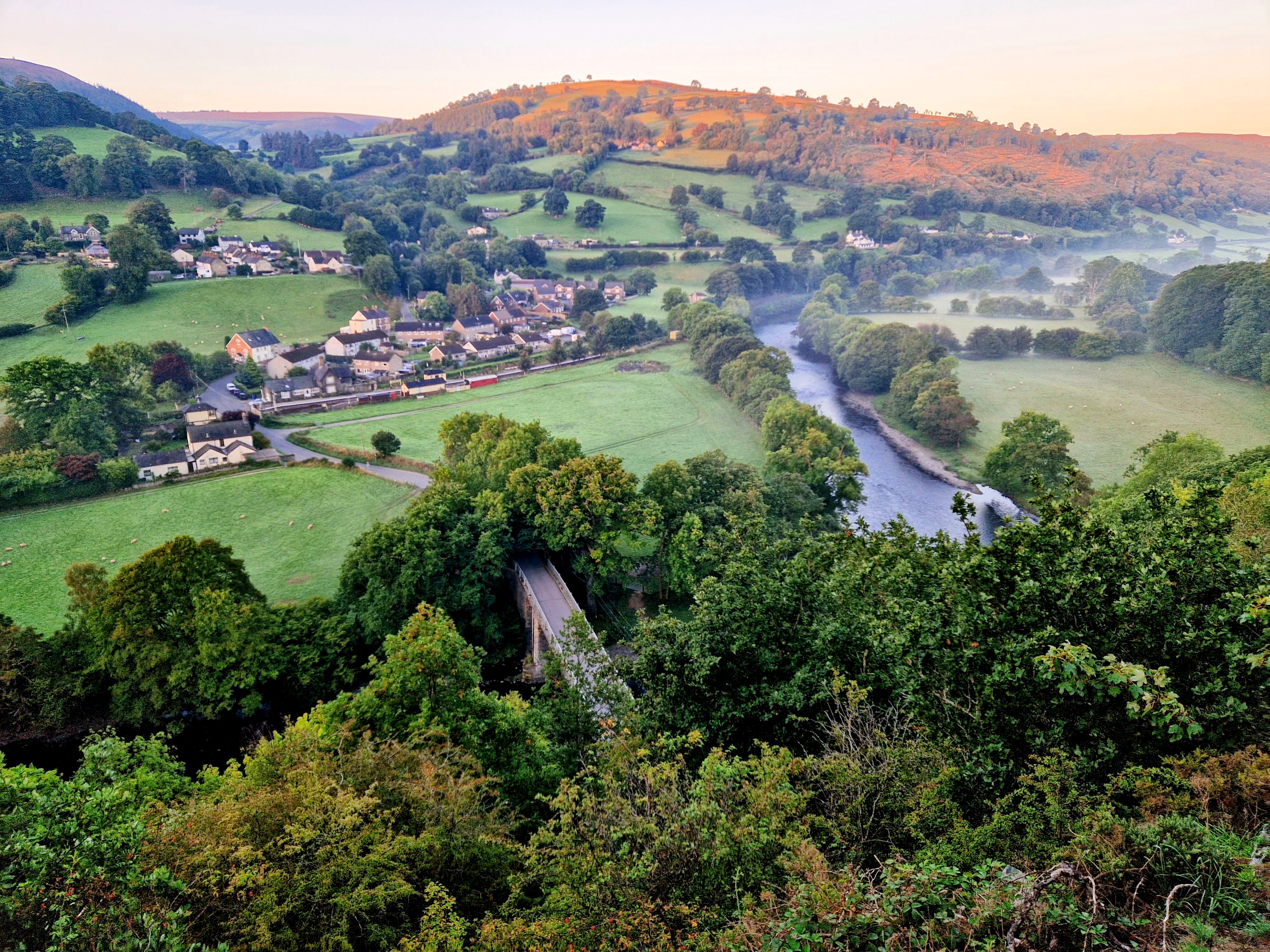
- Glyndyfrdwy, looking south-west.

- Location within Denbighshire
- OS grid reference: SJ149427
- Community: Corwen
- Principal area: Denbighshire
- Country: Wales
- Sovereign state: United Kingdom
- Post town: CORWEN
- Postcode district: LL21
- Dialling code: 01490
- Police: North Wales
- Fire: North Wales
- Ambulance: Welsh
- UK Parliament: Dwyfor Meirionnydd
- Senedd Cymru – Welsh Parliament: Clwyd South

Glyndyfrdwy (Welsh pronunciation: [ɡlɨnˈdəvrdʊɨ]), or sometimes Glyn Dyfrdwy, is a village in the modern county of Denbighshire, Wales. It is situated on the A5 road halfway between Corwen and Llangollen in the Dee Valley (the river Dee is Afon Dyfrdwy in Welsh).

== History ==
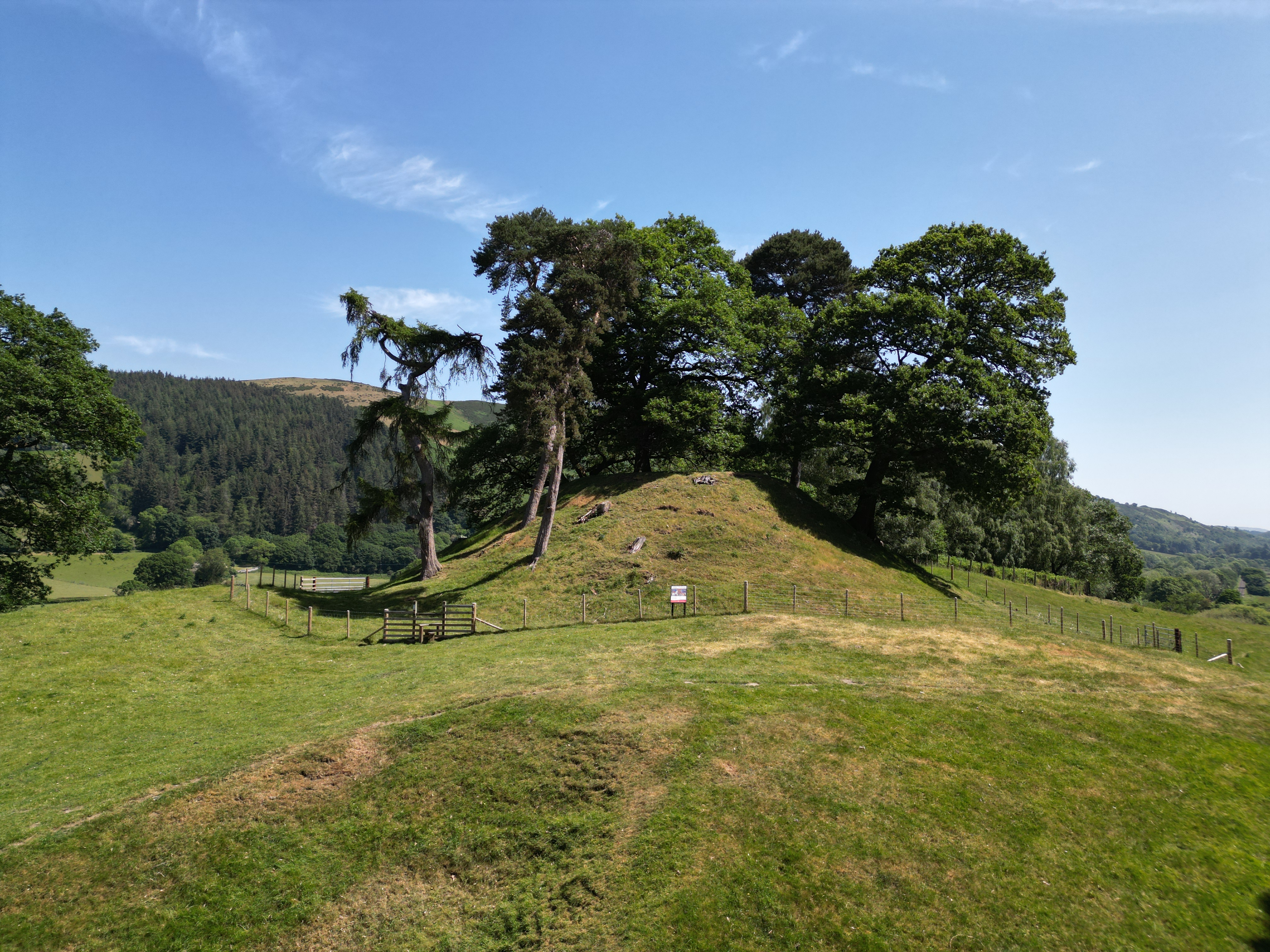
Glyndwr's Mount, near Glyndyfrdwy.

A Norman castle motte was built near the village in the 12th century to command the route through the Dee Valley. Known locally as Owain Glyndŵr's Mount (probably a corruption of mwnt meaning "motte"), only an eroded mound remains.

On 16 September 1400 Owain Glyndŵr was proclaimed Prince of Wales near this village, at his manor of Glyndyfrdwy, Owain Glyndŵr (the Baron of Glyndyfrdwy). His proclamation began the 15-year rebellion against English rule in Wales. Glyndŵr's manor hall is likely to have been a square moated building that was defended by a water-filled moat, a palisade and a gate. In 1403, the site was devastated by the forces of Henry of Monmouth, the English Prince of Wales, who later became King Henry V.

Glyndwr Memorial Hall, Glyndyfrdwy

The Owain Glyndŵr Memorial Hall contains artefacts associated with Glyndŵr. It holds a copy of the Pennal Letter to King Charles VI of France, a document of 1405 ratifying the terms of a 1404 treaty between Glyndŵr and the French, a letter confirming the appointments of his Chancellor Gruffydd Young and his brother-in-law John Hanmer as Ambassadors to the French Court. It also has pictures of Glyndŵr's Parliament house in Dolgellau, a portrait drawn from his Great Seal and a replica seal.

In 1866 the parish of Glyndyfrdwy was created from the former Corwen townships of Carrog, Mwstwr and Tir Llanerch, along with portions of Bonwm and Rhagat. The parish was in the traditional county of Merionethshire until 1974 when it became part of Clwyd under the Local Government Act 1972. In 1996 further changes placed it in the county of Denbighshire.

== Transport ==
Glyndyfrdwy Railway Station

The Great Western Railway line from Ruabon to Llangollen was extended via Corwen, Llanuwchllyn and Dolgellau to Barmouth. Glyndyfrdwy railway station was opened in 1866 and, later, a passing loop and second platform were added there. The line was closed in the 1960s under the Beeching Axe and Glyndyfrdwy station was eventually demolished. In 1977 a group of railway enthusiasts came together to form the Llangollen Railway, with the intention to restore and rebuild a large section of the line. The work was undertaken in stages and by 1991 the track had been replaced as far as Glyndyfrdwy. On 17 April 1992 the first Llangollen Railway passenger train arrived at Glyndyfrdwy. In June 2023 the line was extended to Corwen.

Glyndyfrdwy was also the terminus of the Deeside Tramway, a narrow gauge railway built to serve the local slate quarries. The tramway was one of the last operating industrial railways in Britain that used wooden rails.
