= Llandrillo railway station =

Former railway station in Denbighshire, Wales

Coordinates: 52.9284°N 3.4485°W

Llandrillo
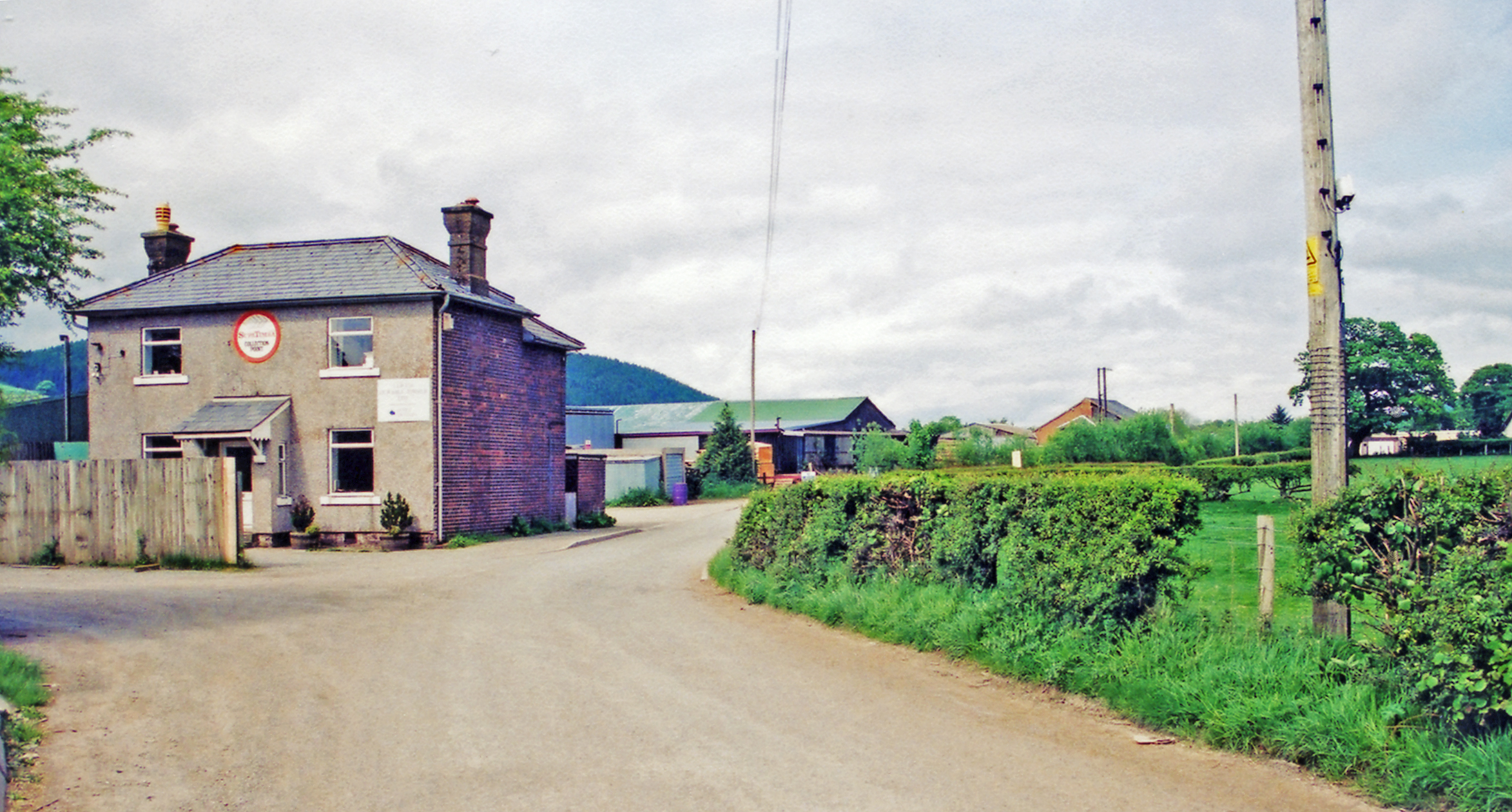
- Site of the station in 2001

General information
- Location: Llandrillo, Denbighshire; Wales
- Platforms: 2

Other information
- Status: Disused

History
- Pre-grouping: Great Western Railway

Key dates
- 16 Jul 1866: Opened
- 14 Dec 1964: Closed to passengers
- 2 Nov 1964: Closed to goods
Location

Llandrillo railway station (ɬandriːɬɔ) in Denbighshire, Wales, was a station on the Ruabon to Barmouth line. It was to have closed to passengers on Monday 18 January 1965 but closed prematurely on 14 December 1964 due to flood damage. The station had a signal box and was a passing place on the single line.

According to the Official Handbook of Stations the following classes of traffic were being handled at this station in 1956: G, P, F, L, H & C and there was a 1-ton crane.

== Neighbouring stations ==
Preceding station	Disused railways	Following station
Cynwyd	Great Western Railway; Ruabon Barmouth Line	Llandderfel
