= Corwen East railway station =

Railway station in Wales

Corwen East Dwyrain Corwen East
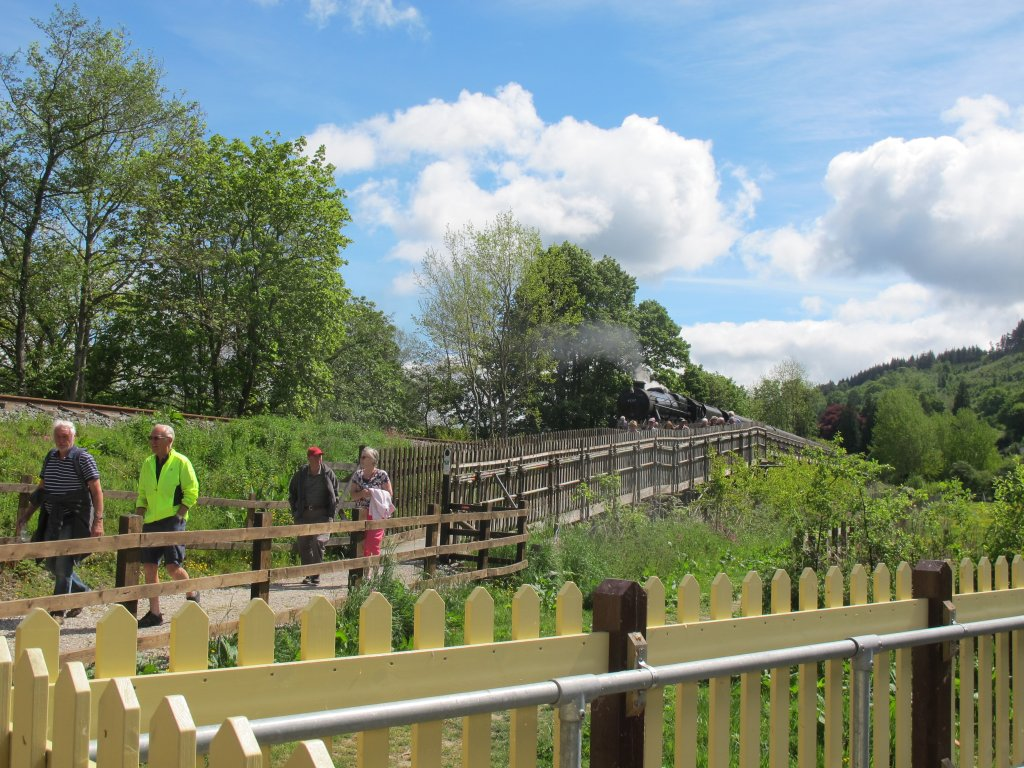
- Corwen East in 2017

General information
- Location: Corwen, Denbighshire; Wales
- Coordinates: 52.9815°N 3.3714°W
- Grid reference: SJ080435
- System: Station on heritage railway
- Operator: Llangollen Railway
- Platforms: 1

Key dates
- 22 October 2014: Opened
- November 2018: Closed
Location

Corwen East railway station in the town of Corwen, Denbighshire, Wales, was a temporary station on the former Ruabon to Barmouth Line. It was the western terminus of the preserved Llangollen Railway from 2014 to 2018.

== History ==
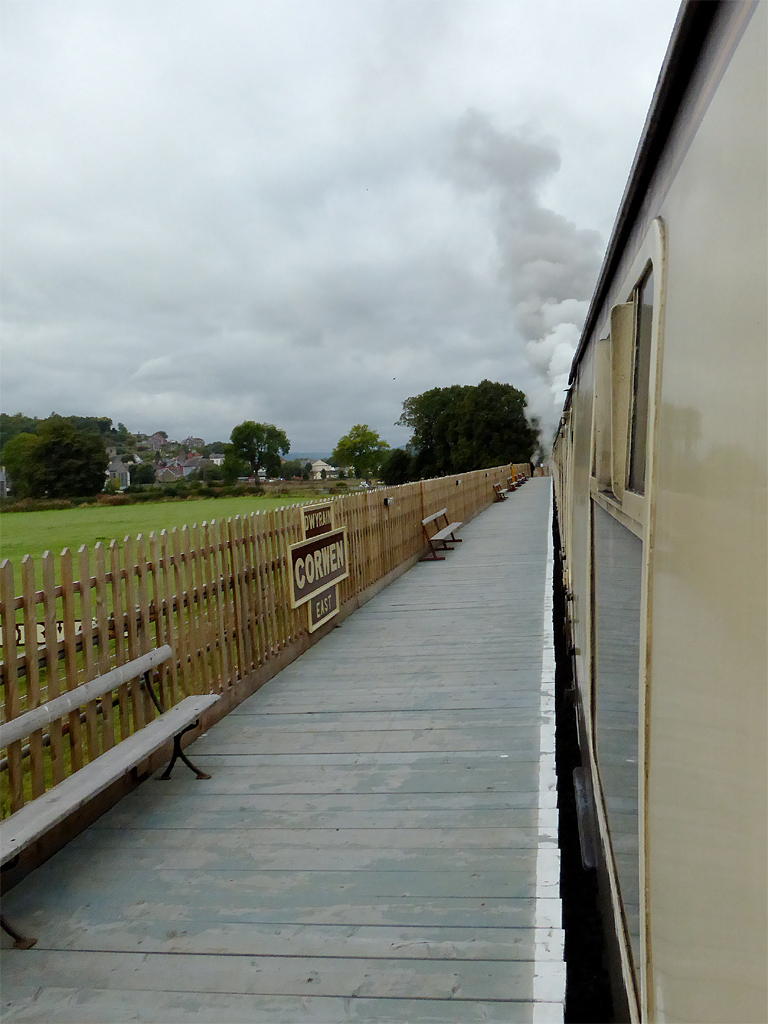
The station's platform seen from a train, in 2015

Corwen East station was opened on 22 October 2014 as the temporary western terminus of the Llangollen Railway. The first train was a private service for supporters of the Corwen Appeal. The first public service trains to Corwen East ran throughout the week commencing 27 October 2014 and at weekends until 9 November 2014. These first trains were considered a success, with nearly 4000 passengers travelling during the first ten days of trains to Corwen East.

The first public services in 2015 ran during the Llangollen Railway's Winter Warmer event on 2–3 January. The first train ran using Class 104 DMU Nos. M50454 and M50528 on 2 January, departing from Carrog at 09.10 and arriving in Corwen East at 09.17.

There was a formal opening ceremony on Saint David's Day, 1 March 2015. Officials unveiled the bilingual Corwen name board "Dwyrain Corwen East", showing the station's name in both languages: Dwyrain Corwen and Corwen East.

The station was closed in November 2018 and dismantled in early 2019. It is now replaced by the permanent Corwen station alongside the town's main car park.

== Service ==
Preceding station	Heritage railways	Following station
Disused railways
Terminus	Llangollen Railway 2014–2018	Carrog towards Llangollen
