= Deeside Tramway =

Coordinates: 52.9753°N 3.2654°W

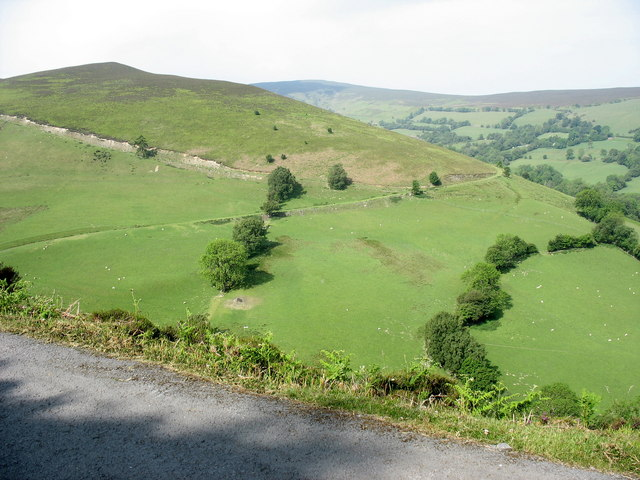
- The trackbed of the tramway east of Deeside quarry

Overview
- Headquarters: Glyndyfrdwy
- Locale: Wales
- Dates of operation: 1870s–1947
- Successor: Abandoned

Technical
- Track gauge: 2 ft 6 in (762 mm)
- Length: 3 miles

The Deeside Tramway was a gravity and horse-worked, 2 ft 6 in (762 mm) narrow gauge industrial railway connecting the slate workings on the Dee valley with the main road at Glyndyfrdwy and later the Great Western Railway's Ruabon-Dolgellau railway. It was one of the last tramways in regular use to use wooden rails covered in iron sheaths.

== History ==
The tramway was constructed around 1870, following the opening of the Llangollen and Corwen Railway which passed through Glyndyfrdwy. The tramway initially ran from the Deeside Slate Works at Nant-y-Pandy to the Deeside quarry.

The tramway was unusual in its use of wooden rails with iron sheaths on the running surfaces, a very early form of permanent way that had almost entirely died out by this date.

In the late 1870s, the tramway was extended in two directions, bringing its total length to 3 miles (4.8 km). The line was extended north from the Deeside slate works along the east side of Nant-y-Pandy to the head of a long incline that dropped through Glyndyfrdwy to a transshipment wharf with the Llangollen and Corwen Railway. The line was extended south and west from Deeside Quarry, running up the west side of the quarry by a further incline, then looping westwards along the hillside to the foot of the exit incline of the Moel Fferna quarry. These extensions were laid with traditional iron rails, although the original section retained the wooden rails throughout its lifetime.

The Moel Fferna quarry gained its own oil engine-powered mill in 1911, and so wasn't so dependent on the water powered Deeside Slate works. When the Deeside quarry and the Deeside slate works closed in 1921 the line remained in use to bring slate down to the railway at Glyndyfrdwy from Moel Fferna quarry. The line continued operating until just after World War II, finally closing in 1947.

== Operation ==
Throughout its life, the tramway was operated by gravity workings from the quarries to Glyndyfrdwy, with return trains hauled by horses. Brakemen controlled the gravity descent of the loaded wagons, and there was a accident in 1907 when a brakeman, Edward Rowlands aged 19, was braking loaded wagons headed to the railway when he was 'overtaken' by another wagon with fatal consequences.

== The remains of the tramway ==
=== Glyndyfrdwy ===
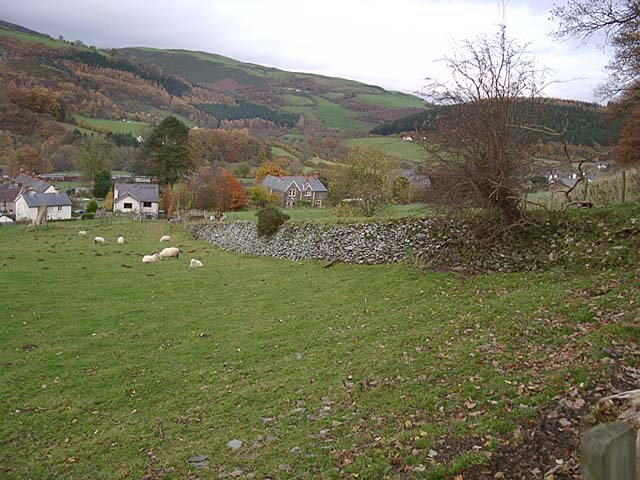
The remains of the incline running through the village

The remains of the trans-shipment wharf are to the east of the crossing keeper's box on the Llangollen Railway and are now part of a children's play area. The inclined plane runs approximately south up the hill. One modern house is built across the incline on the north side of the A5 road. Another house has been built across the formation on the south side of the A5, and the tunnel under the road was filled in during the early 1960s

=== Glyndyfrdwy to Nant-y-Pandy ===
At the top of the incline, the walls of the winding house still stand. From here, a footpath follows the trackbed of the tramway. There are occasional sleepers and lengths of flat-bottomed rail along this section. There are several building remains at the Deeside Slate Works, and explanatory signboards have been installed there. Running south is the shallow incline towards Deeside Slab Quarry. There are longitudinal wooden rails still in situ in many places, especially in the damp cuttings. Occasionally, a line of rusty metal marks where one of the tie bars that held the rails to the gauge sat. In at least one location, a metal rail sheath is still visible over the wood of a rail.

=== Nant-y-Pandy to Deeside Slab Quarry ===
Above Nant-y-Pandy, the route passes the site of the reservoir that provided water power to the mill's overshot waterwheel, before the valley road breaches the formation. Above Ty'n y Wern, the tramway formation reappears on the hillside above the road, past Tan-y-Graig, until the road climbs up and takes over the tramway route. From here until the Deeside quarry, the tramway formation is now a farm road. The formation crosses the head of the valley in a horseshoe curve and rounds the bluff to reach the quarry. At the south-west edge of the quarry, an incline leads up to the route to Moel Fferna quarry.

== See also ==
- British narrow gauge slate railways
