= Cynwyd railway station (Wales) =

Former railway station in Denbighshire, Wales

Coordinates: 52.9596°N 3.4108°W

Cynwyd
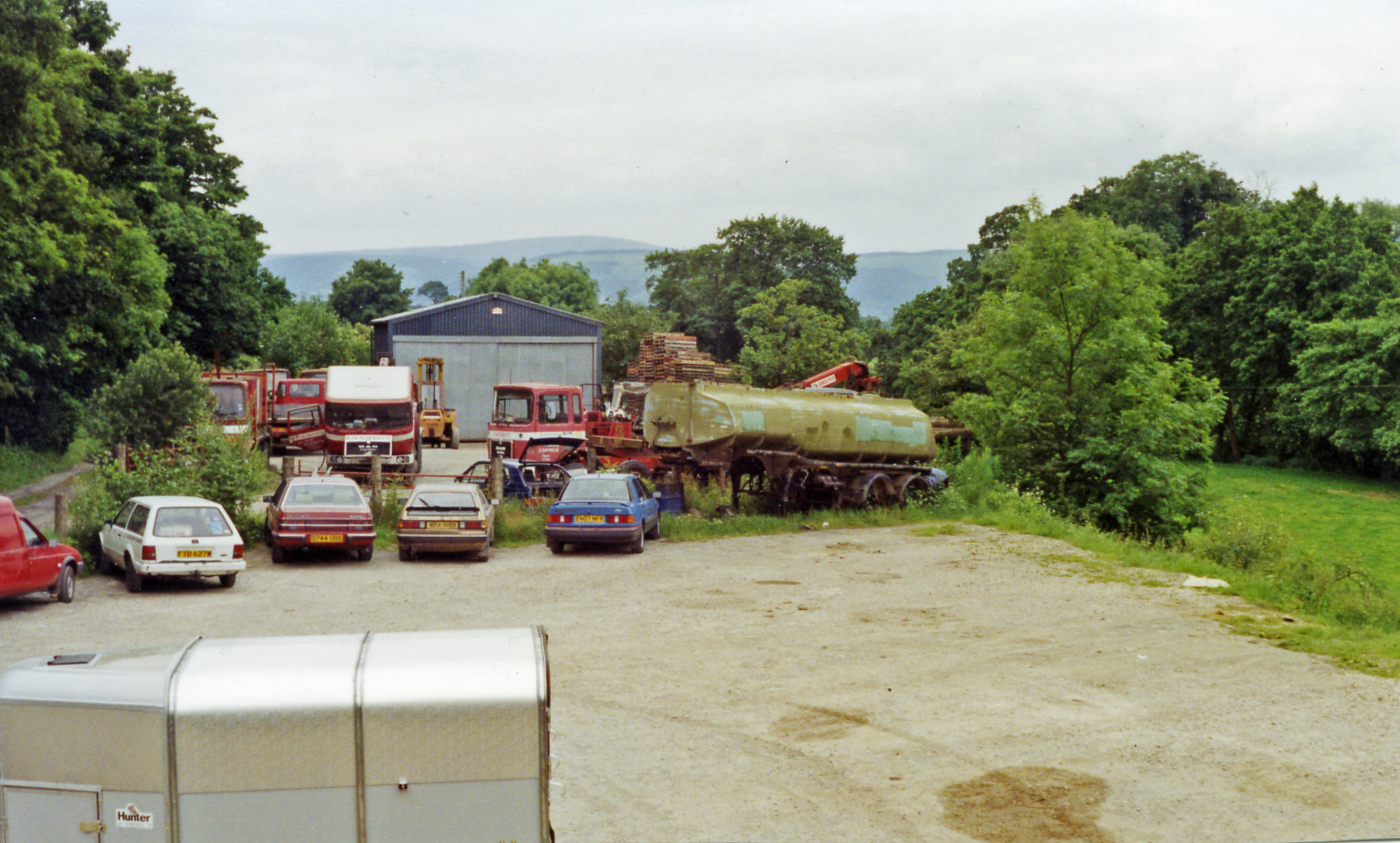
- Site of the station in 1992

General information
- Location: Cynwyd, Denbighshire; Wales
- Platforms: 1

Other information
- Status: Disused

History
- Pre-grouping: Great Western Railway

Key dates
- 16 Jul 1866: Opened
- 14 Dec 1964: Closed to passengers
- 4 May 1964: Closed to goods
Location

Cynwyd (/ˈkʌnwɪd/) was a railway station in Cynwyd, Denbighshire, Wales on the Ruabon Barmouth Line. It was to have closed to passengers on Monday 18 January 1965 but closed prematurely on 14 December 1964 due to flood damage.

== Neighbouring stations ==
Preceding station	Disused railways	Following station
Corwen	Great Western Railway; Ruabon to Barmouth Line	Llandrillo
