= Ifor Williams Trailers =

Welsh trailer manufacturer

Coordinates: 52.99283°N 3.38094°W

- Industry: Manufacturing of trailers under 3,500 kilograms (7,700 lb)
- Founder: Ifor Williams
- Headquarters: Corwen, Denbighshire Wales
- Number of locations: 5
- Key people: John Williams (Director and CEO); Carole Williams (Director)
- Number of employees: 545 (2024)

Ifor Williams Trailers is the United Kingdom's largest manufacturer of trailers under 3,500 kilograms (7,700 lb), based in Corwen, Denbighshire, North Wales.

== History ==
Founded in 1958 by local farmer Ifor Williams, an on-site galvanizing plant gives the company total control over quality and efficiency in the production of chassis and other assemblies. The company employs approximately 800 people across six sites in Clawdd Poncen, Cynwyd, Ruthin, Deeside and Sandycroft, Flintshire. During the Great Recession, 63 employees were made redundant in late 2008.

Production was affected by fire on two occasions. The first, on 28 August 2012, caused severe damage to the company's Deeside plant. The second, on 14 September 2017, was limited to machinery at the Clawdd Poncen site.

Production capacity for specialised "Business in a Box" style trailers was expanded in 2021, with the opening of the site on Boundary Park, within the Deeside Industrial Park. This site also functions as the warehouse and worldwide distribution facility for parts.

== Sales ==
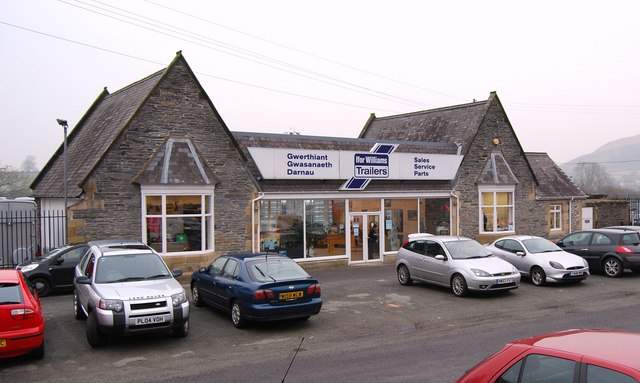
Main showroom at the former Corwen railway station

Their main showroom is located in the former Corwen railway station. Product distribution is handled by over fifty main dealers in the UK, with 25% of total sales going for export via independent distributors across Europe.

== Sponsorship of Wrexham Football Club ==
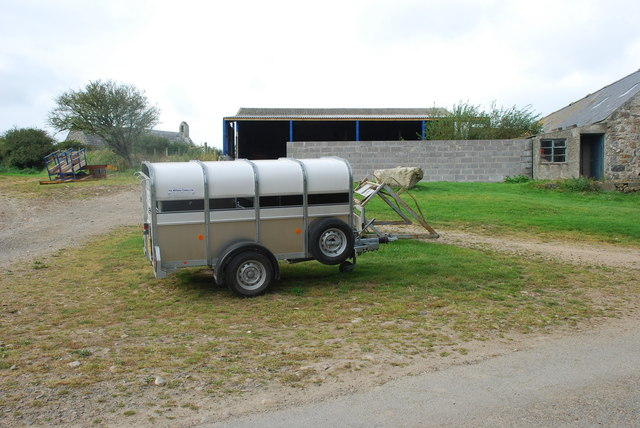
An Ifor Williams trailer used for carrying sheep, pictured in Wales

In June 2016, Ifor Williams became the main kit sponsor of Wrexham Football Club. The kit launch was held at the Urdd National Eisteddfod in Flint.

In 2020 actors Ryan Reynolds and Rob McElhenney created an advert for the company as part of their purchase application for Wrexham Football Club.

On 30 June 2021, Wrexham's announced that Chinese social media company TikTok will be the club's new shirt sponsor for the 2021–22 campaign. Ifor Williams will now become the shorts sponsor. This deal was renewed in 2023 and is scheduled to continue for the foreseeable future.
