= Corwen railway station =

Railway station in Denbighshire, Wales

Coordinates: 52.98138°N 3.37852°W

Corwen
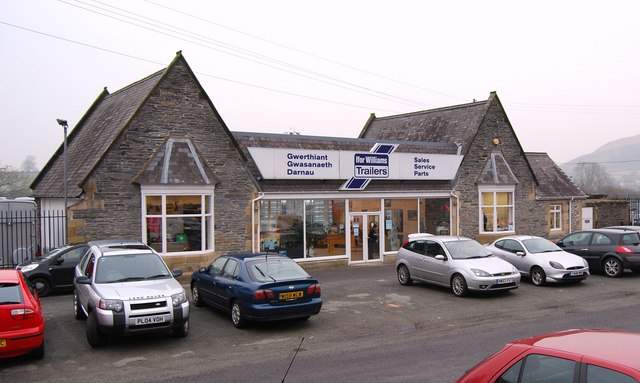
- Original station building (closed in 1964) in January 2010

General information
- Location: Corwen, Denbighshire; Wales
- Platforms: 2

History
- Original company: Llangollen & Corwen Railway
- Pre-grouping: Great Western Railway
- Post-grouping: Great Western Railway; Western Region of British Railways

Key dates
- 1 Sept 1865: Opened
- 2 Nov 1964: Closed to goods
- 14 Dec 1964: Closed to passengers
- 2 Jun 2023: Reopened on new site
Location

Corwen railway station refers to two stations, on different sites, which have existed in the town of Corwen in Denbighshire, Wales.

The first was on the Ruabon to Barmouth Line. It was opened in 1865 and closed in 1964. The second is located on the preserved Llangollen Railway and was opened in 2023.

== Original station ==
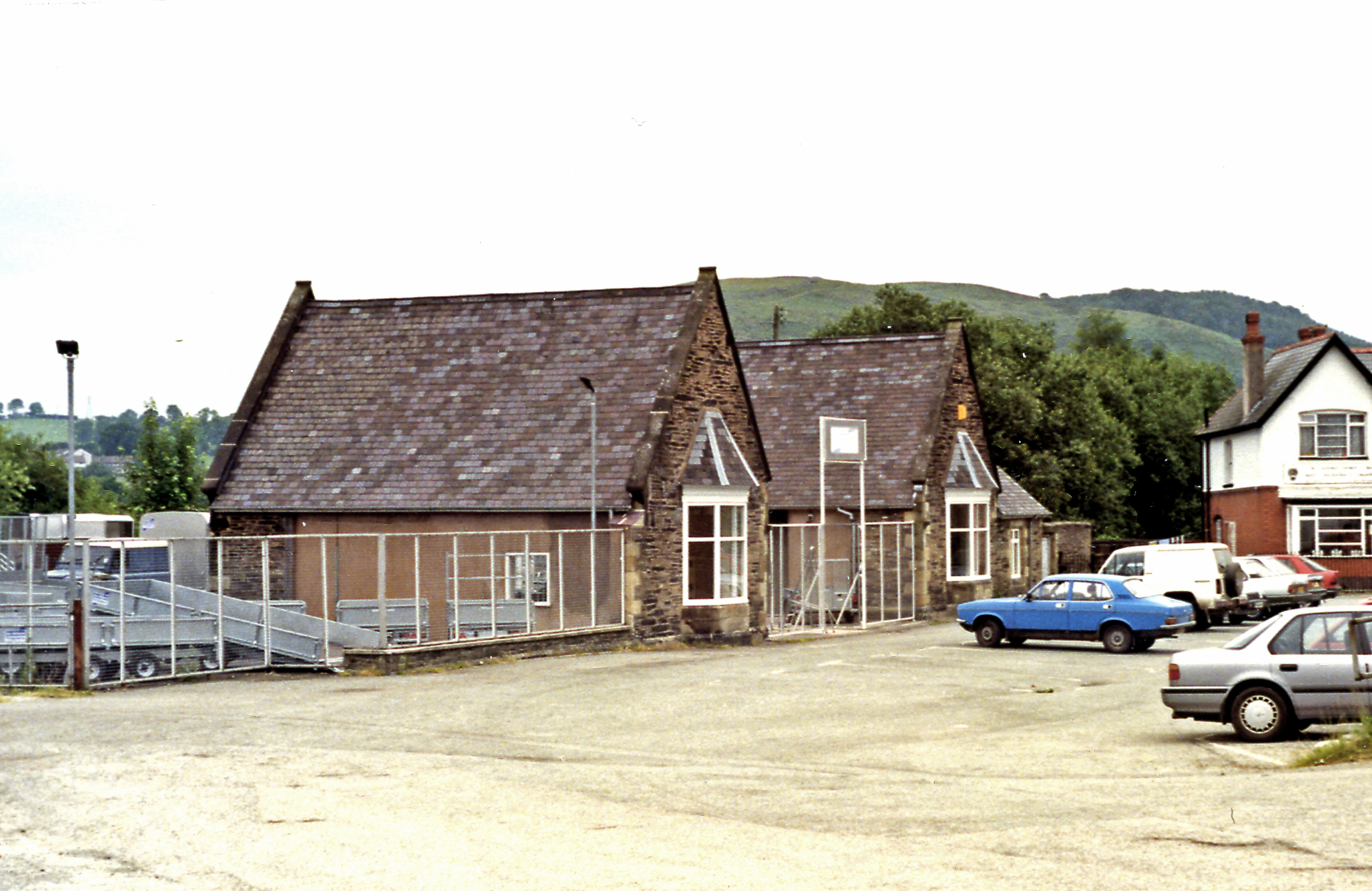
The main station building in 1992, showing the demolished wings and central section, about to be redeveloped as a showroom

The first station to open was a temporary station to the east of the town, when the line from Denbigh opened in October 1864. A permanent station was opened by the Great Western Railway in May 1865. The station had two platforms and a signal box, and was a passing place on the single track line.

Corwen was also the southern terminus of the Denbigh, Ruthin and Corwen Railway (DR&CR), which ran from Rhyl via Denbigh and Ruthin to Corwen, opening in 1864. According to the Official Handbook of Stations, the following classes of traffic were being handled at this station in 1956: G, P, F, L, H and C, and there was a 1-ton 10 cwt crane. The former DR&CR route officially closed in 1965.

Corwen station itself was scheduled to close under the Beeching Axe to passengers on Monday 18 January 1965; however, it closed prematurely on Monday 14 December 1964 due to flood damage west of the station.

The main station building and site remains intact today, in private use since 1990 as a showroom for Ifor Williams Trailers; the trackbed was infilled, both main building wings and the toilets were demolished, and the central section was rebuilt to accommodate a showroom.

== New station (Llangollen Railway) ==
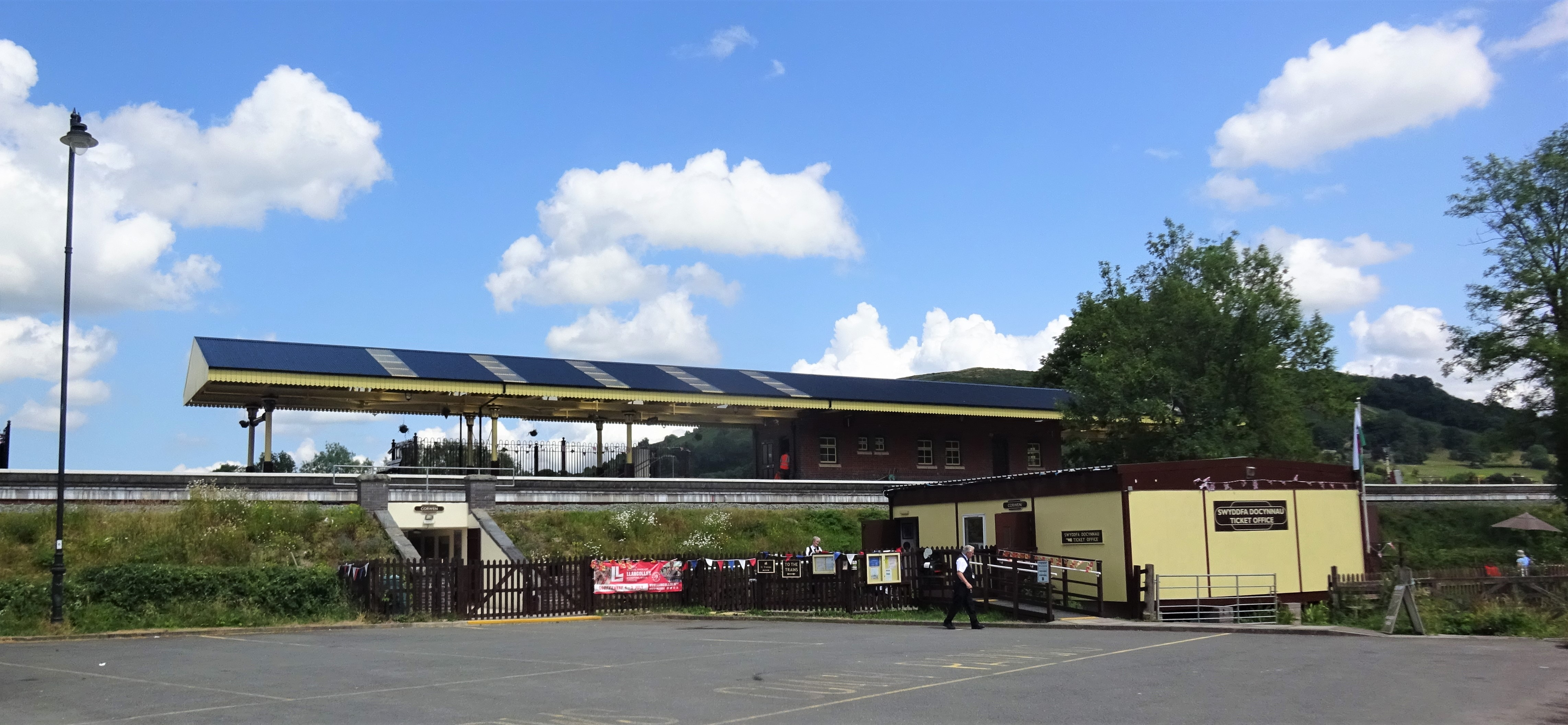
The new Corwen railway station in 2023

In 2011, the preserved Llangollen Railway began work to re-construct the 2 1/2-mile (4.0 km) section of the permanent way from its then terminus at Carrog, past the site of Bonwm Halt and on to Corwen. As the original Corwen station is now in private use, and the track bed in between also sub-divided, construction of a new station, east of the original, was included in the project.

The first stage of the project saw the extension of the line to a temporary station at Corwen East, which opened in October 2014. There was a formal opening ceremony on St David's Day, 1 March 2015, followed by the first full season of trains. As a final stage, in early 2019 the temporary structure at Corwen East was removed and the line was extended a further 200 metres to the new permanent station, constructed next to the town's main car park. The new station opened on 2 June 2023. It features an island platform with two platform edges (accessed via a pedestrian underpass), a headshunt, and a small siding on the same alignment as, and accessed from, the run-round loop.

Preceding station	Heritage railways	Following station
Terminus	Llangollen Railway	Carrog towards Llangollen
Disused railways
Bonwm Halt	Great Western Railway; Ruabon to Barmouth Line	Cynwyd
Gwyddelwern	London and North Western Railway; Denbigh, Ruthin and Corwen Railway	Terminus
