= Llangollen Railway =

Heritage steam railway in North Wales

Llangollen Railway Rheilffordd Llangollen
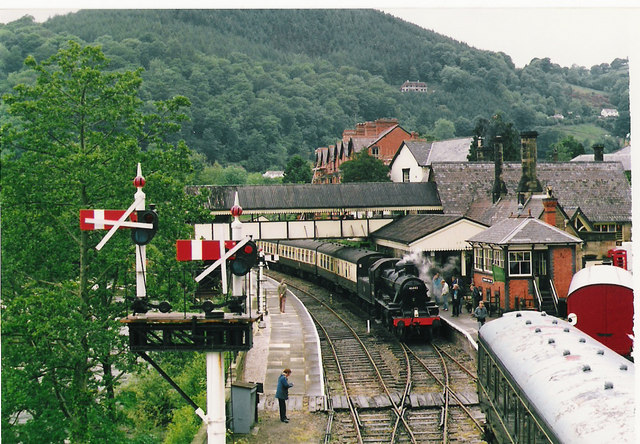
- Llangollen railway station by the River Dee
- Locale: Wales, UK
- Terminus: Eastern: Llangollen; Western: Corwen
- Coordinates: 52.972°N 3.175°W

Commercial operations
- Name: Llangollen Railway
- Original gauge: 1,435 mm (4 ft 8 1/2 in) standard gauge

Preserved operations
- Operated by: Llangollen Railway Trust
- Stations: 5, and 1 halt
- Length: 10 miles (16 km)
- Preserved gauge: 1,435 mm (4 ft 8 1/2 in) standard gauge

Commercial history
- Opened: 1862
- 1877: Absorbed by Great Western Railway
- 1964: Closed

Preservation history
- 1975: Llangollen railway station taken over by the Preservation Society and full restoration work and reconstruction begins
- 1980: Llangollen Railway granted light railway order
- 1981: Pentrefelin reached as Line extended first time (but re-opened)
- 1986: Re-opening of extension to and Berwyn re-opens
- 1990: Deeside Halt opens, line extended
- 1993: Glyndyfrdwy Reopens, line extended
- 1996: Opening of extension to and Carrog re-opens
- 2011: Work starts on extension to Corwen
- 2013: Extension work reaches Bonwm Halt
- 2014: Extension work reaches Corwen, Corwen East opens.
- 2019: Corwen East station closes in preparation for line extension
- 2023: Extension to new Corwen station opens
- Headquarters: Llangollen

The Llangollen Railway (Welsh: Rheilffordd Llangollen) is a volunteer-run heritage railway in Denbighshire, North Wales, which operates between Llangollen and Corwen. The standard gauge line, which is 10 miles (16 km) long, runs on part of the former Ruabon – Barmouth GWR route that closed in 1965. It operates daily services in the summer as well as weekends throughout the winter months, using a variety of mainly ex-GWR steam locomotives as well as several diesel engines and diesel multiple units. A 2 1/2 miles (4 km) extension of the railway has been built to complete the line to Corwen.

In March 2021, the railway company announced that, having made a loss in three consecutive years, they had invited their bank to appoint receivers. Operation of the railway was handed over to the Llangollen Railway Trust, and the line reopened July 2021.

== History ==
=== Commercial service: 1865–1962 ===
Llangollen was already a popular place for tourists by the 1840s. Travel up to this time had been by horse-drawn carriage, but by the 1840s, the Shrewsbury to Chester line had been completed, which allowed passengers to alight at Llangollen Road (later known as Whitehurst Halt), and then take a coach towards Holyhead.

However, the commercial development of the local mining industry meant that the development of a railway became essential to the region's economic development. A number of schemes were proposed, including one by the LNWR, but it was not until 1 August 1859 that a scheme engineered by Henry Robertson received royal assent as the Vale of Llangollen Railway Act 1859 (22 & 23 Vict. c. lxiv). The 5 1/4 miles (8.4 km) Vale of Llangollen Railway left the Shrewsbury to Chester main line 1/2 mile (0.8 km) south of Ruabon, and proceeded as a single track line on a double track route via Acrefair to the new station at Llangollen. The line opened to freight on 1 December 1861 and to passengers on 2 June 1862 at a temporary terminus on the town's eastern outskirts.

The extension to Corwen was undertaken by the associated but separate Llangollen and Corwen Railway company, and involved constructing a long tunnel under the Berwyn Mountains. It, together with the new centrally positioned and larger station in Llangollen, opened for service on 1 May 1865.

=== Closure ===
Designated for closure under the Beeching cuts, the railway closed to passenger services on Monday 18 January 1965. The section between Ruabon and Llangollen Goods Yard remained open for freight traffic until April 1968, but immediately after the cessation of operations the track was removed from the whole line between Ruabon and Barmouth.

== Preservation ==
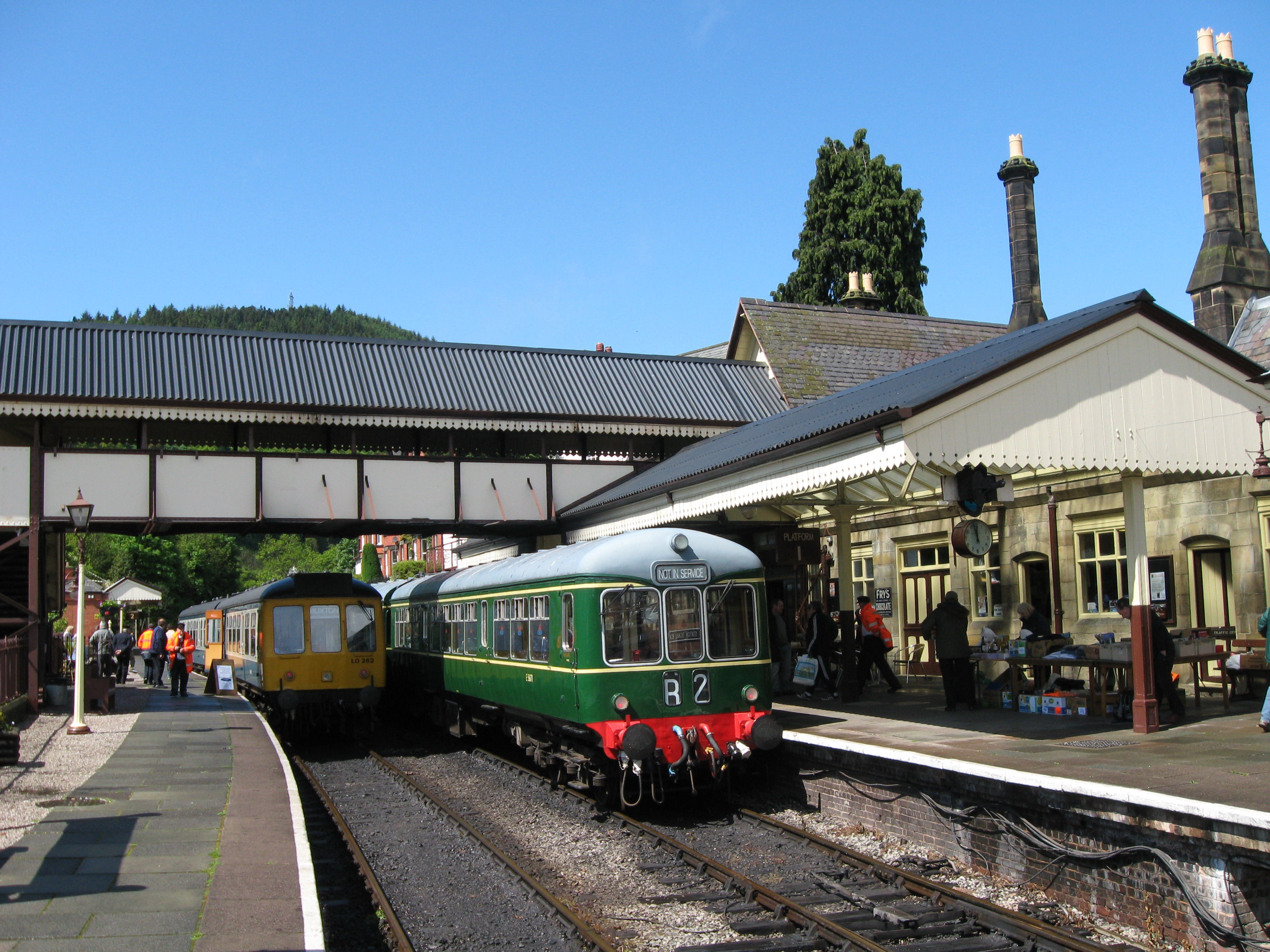
Class 109 and Class 108 DMU-Railcars at Llangollen.

=== Reopening: 1972–1975 ===
The Flint and Deeside Railway Preservation Society was founded in 1972 with the aim of re-opening a closed railway. At first, the society was interested in the Dyserth to Prestatyn line, but that line was deemed unsuitable because a small amount of freight traffic was still using it. The society moved its attention to the Llangollen to Corwen section of the Ruabon to Barmouth line. The local council granted a lease of the Llangollen railway station building and 3 miles (5 km) of track to the society, with the hope that the railway would improve the local economy and bring more tourists to Llangollen. The station reopened on 13 September 1975, with just 60 feet (18 m) of track.

=== Rebuilding and resurrection: 1975–1996 ===
Early progress was slow due to a lack of funding, though in 1977 Shell Oil donated a mile of unused track. Volunteers started laying the track with the aim of reaching Pentrefelin, 3/4 mile (1.2 km) from Llangollen. Work finished in July 1981 with the remaining quarter mile of track used to lay sidings at the old Llangollen Goods Junction to house the railway's growing fleet of rolling stock.

The working railway attracted the interest of many private companies. The local council renewed the lease of the land to the railway for a further 21 years. The Llangollen Railway Trust was donated significant amounts of track, allowing the next extension of the line to Berwyn. This involved a £30,000 refurbishment by the local council of the Dee Bridge, which had fallen into disrepair since the commercial closure of the line. The first trains operated over the newly extended 1.75 mile (2.8 km) line to Berwyn in March 1986. As rebuilding work progressed train services were extended (via the 689 yard long Berwyn Tunnel) to Deeside Halt (in 1990), Glyndyfrdwy (in 1993) and finally into Carrog on 2 May 1996.

=== Extension to Corwen ===
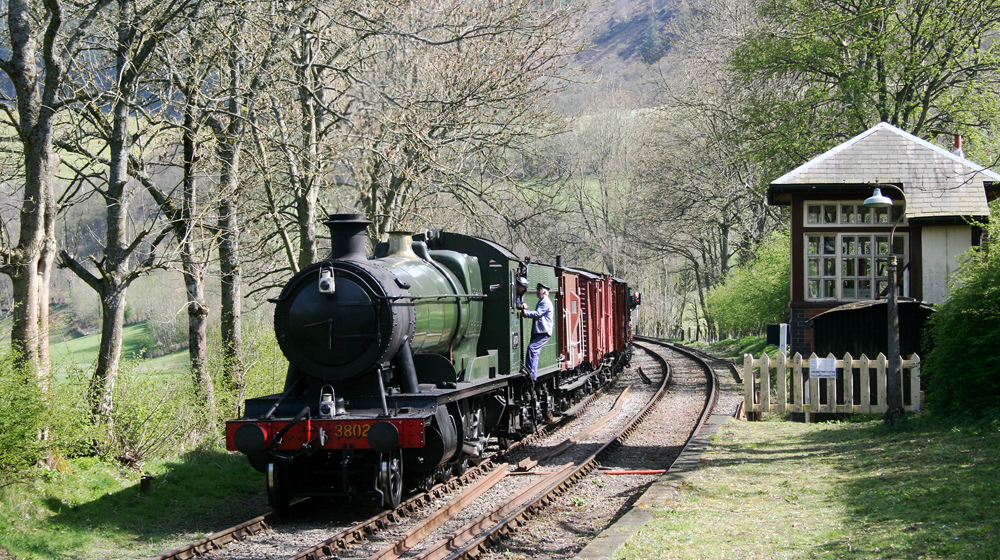
GWR 2884 Class number 3802 pulling a goods train during the Llangollen Railway steam gala weekend in 2011.

In 2011, work (including reconstruction work) started on the 2 1/2 miles (4.0 km) section of track past the site of the former Bonwm Halt to Corwen. Because the former Corwen railway station site had been in private use as an Ifor Williams Trailers showroom since 1990, and the track bed in between is sub-divided, a temporary station was built on the eastern side of the town.

The first stage of the project was completed in late 2014, with special trains running on 22 October 2014 to the new station at Corwen East for those who had contributed to the project. Regular passenger services to Corwen East started on 27 October 2014. The official opening, on 1 March 2015, was marked by a special train.

The final stage at Corwen to a new station with permanent facilities and a run round loop opened on 2 June 2023. It is uncertain if the trust can extend eastwards towards Ruabon or westwards to Cynwyd as the trackbed was not fully safeguarded against modern development.

=== Financial issues and receivership ===
In March 2020, the railway announced that a financial crisis had been averted due to £125,000 in donations from supporters, enabling it to avoid a company voluntary arrangement after making pre-tax losses of £330,601 in 2018, £329,175 in 2019 and £258,804 in 2020. In April 2020 the company announced that it was at risk of closure due to the effects of the COVID-19 pandemic, which forced the cancellation of services. In May 2020, Prime Minister Boris Johnson stated that the line would have a "glorious future" after raising £75,000 in share purchases and donations.

The line was awarded £161,000 from the National Lottery Heritage Fund in August 2020 to help deal with financial pressures caused by the closure of the line, but then had to launch an emergency appeal for funds in November 2020, when urgent repairs were found to be required on the Dee Bridge. In December 2020 the line reported that the extension to Corwen was still progressing, despite the pandemic making funding an issue.

On 1 March 2021, the Llangollen Railway PLC announced that it was going into receivership, with debts of about £350,000 and "no prospect" of meeting its liabilities. Operation of the railway was handed over to the Llangollen Railway Trust, and the line reopened in July 2021.

== Locomotives and rolling stock ==
As of August 2021, many services are operated by 1950s-built diesel multiple units, offering a splendid view of the local scenery. At that time, there was only one operational steam locomotive based on the line: former GWR 2-8-0 No.3802.

== See also ==
- Bala Lake Railway
- Ruabon to Barmouth Line
- Heritage railway
