= Llangollen railway station =

Heritage railway station in north Wales

Llangollen
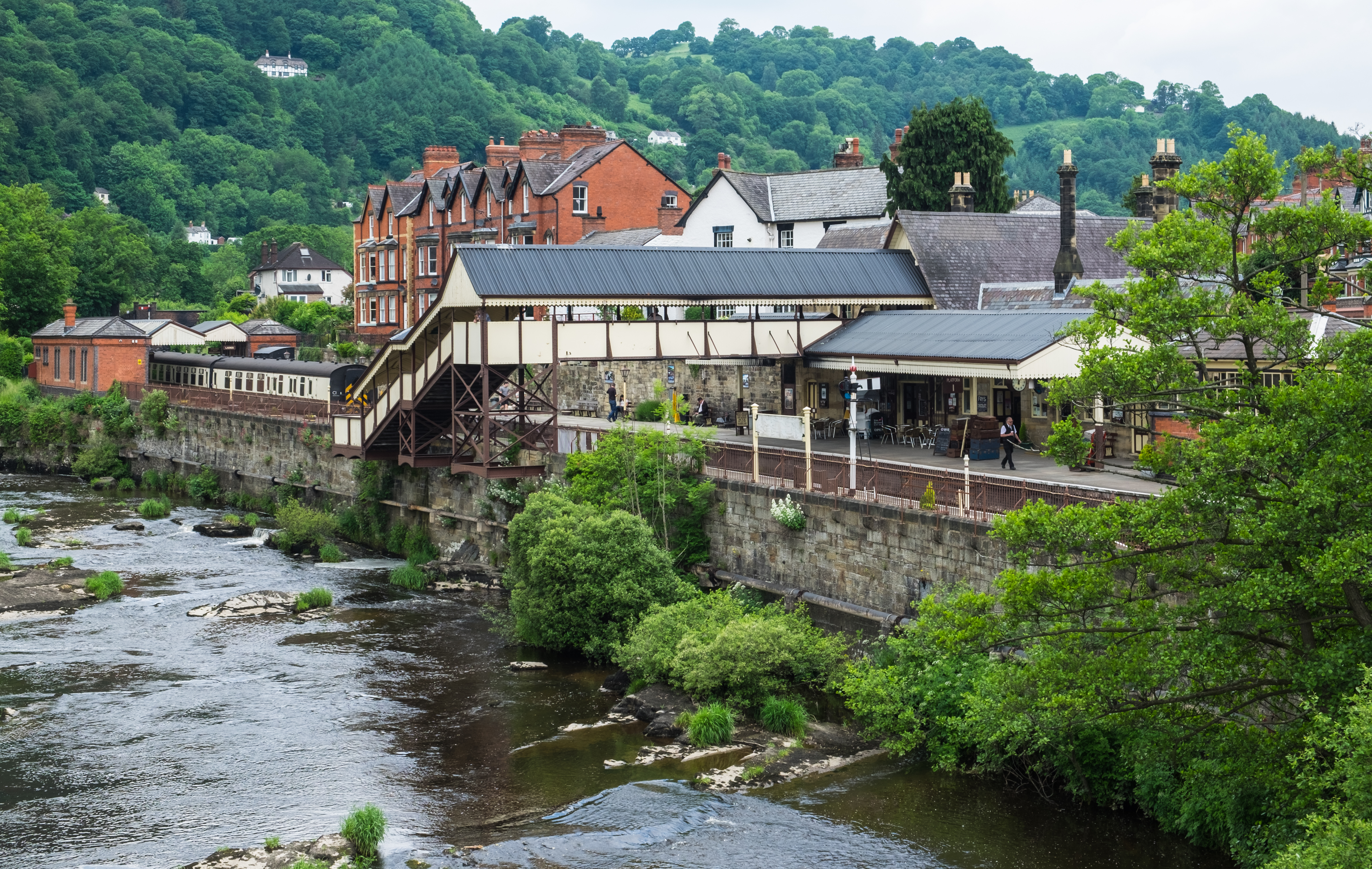
- Alongside the River Dee

General information
- Location: Llangollen, Denbighshire; Wales
- Coordinates: 52.9713°N 3.1714°W
- Grid reference: SJ214421
- System: Station on heritage railway
- Manager: Llangollen Railway
- Platforms: 2

History
- Original company: Vale of Llangollen Railway
- Pre-grouping: Great Western Railway
- Post-grouping: Great Western Railway

Key dates
- 2 June 1862: Temporary first station opened
- 1 May 1865: Second station opened
- 18 January 1965: Closed for passenger service
- April 1968: Closed for goods traffic
- 13 September 1975: The Llangollen Railway is formed and begins reconstruction westwards
- 1981: Llangollen Station re-opens officially

Listed Building – Grade II
- Feature: Railway Station (Main Building & Footbridge)
- Designated: 22 December 1989
- Reference no.: 2083
Location

Llangollen railway station is a preserved railway station on the former Ruabon to Barmouth Line, and now the eastern terminus of the preserved Llangollen Railway. It serves the market town of Llangollen, in Denbighshire, England.

== History ==
=== Development ===
Llangollen was already a popular place for Victorian era tourists by the 1840s. Travel up to this point had been by horse-drawn carriage, but by the 1840s the Shrewsbury to Chester line had been completed, allowing passengers to alight at Llangollen Road, and then take a coach towards Holyhead.

However, the commercial development of the local mining industry meant that the development of a railway became essential to the region's economic development. A number of schemes were proposed, including one by the LNWR, but it was not until 1 August 1859 that a scheme engineered by Henry Robertson received Royal Assent. The 5.25 miles (8.45 km) Vale of Llangollen Railway left the Shrewsbury to Chester main line .5 miles (0.80 km) south of Ruabon, and built as a single track line on a double track route proceeded via Acrefair to the new station at Llangollen. The line opened to freight on 1 December 1861, and to passengers on 2 June 1862 at a temporary terminus on the town's eastern outskirts.

The extension to Corwen was undertaken by the associated but separate Llangollen and Corwen Railway company, and involved constructing a long tunnel under the local Berwyn Mountains. It, together with the new centrally positioned and larger station in Llangollen, opened for service on 1 May 1865.

=== Operations ===
The already accommodated double-tracking of the line from Ruabon was completed in September 1900 to Llangollen Goods Junction, located 0.5 miles (0.80 km) west of the current station. Between then and World War I, Acrefair, Trevor and Llangollen stations were all in part remodelled to cope with additional traffic. There were signal boxes at Llangollen and Llangollen Goods Jnc., with the latter controlling access to the goods yard, which today is a depot for the preserved railway.

According to the Official Handbook of Stations the following classes of traffic were being handled at this station in 1956: G, P, F, L, H, C and there was a 3-ton crane. There was also a private siding at Pentrefelin (now a carriage depot) that was used by the White Sand & Silica Company. Between the two world wars, a direct service connection time of less than 6hrs was possible on a daily basis between London Paddington and Barmouth.

=== Closure ===
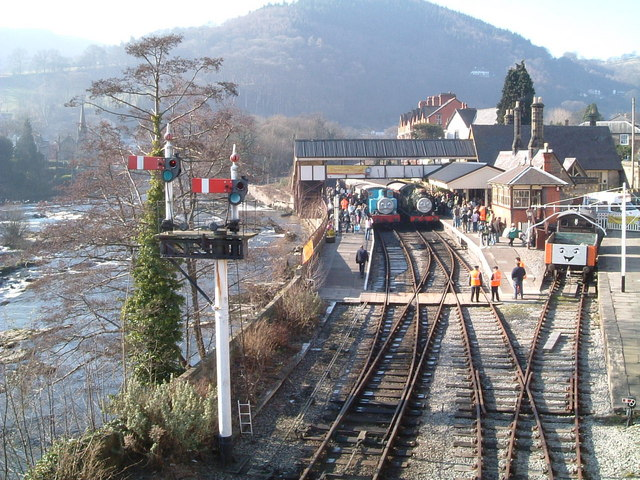
The eastern end of the preserved Llangollen railway station, during a Thomas the Tank Engine event, February 2008

Designated for closure under the Beeching cuts, the station closed to passengers on Monday 18 January 1965 but the section between Ruabon and Llangollen Goods Yard remained opened for freight traffic until April 1968. Immediately afterwards the track was removed from the whole line between Ruabon and Barmouth Jn.

== Preservation ==
The Flint and Deeside Railway Preservation Society was founded in 1972, with the aim of preserving one of the region's "axed" railways. Originally the society was interested in preserving the Dyserth to Prestatyn line; however that line was deemed unsuitable because a small amount of freight traffic was still using it. The society refocused its attention on the Llangollen to Corwen section of the Ruabon to Barmouth line. The local council granted a lease on the Llangollen railway station building, as well as 3 miles (4.8 km) of trackbed, with the hope that the railway would improve the local economy and bring more tourists to Llangollen. The station reopened on 13 September 1975, with just 60 feet (18.3 m) of track.

The station was fully reopened in 1981 by the preserved Llangollen Railway as its eastern terminus. The refurbished station now encloses the Robertson Suite, which is available for hire as a venue for licensed weddings, functions or training.

== Neighbouring stations ==
| Preceding station | Heritage railways | Following station |
|---|---|---|
| Berwyn towards Corwen | Llangollen Railway | Terminus |
Historical railways
| Terminus | Great Western Railway; Vale of Llangollen Railway | Sun Bank Halt |
| Berwyn | Great Western Railway; Llangollen and Corwen Railway | Terminus |
