= Corwen =

Town in Denbighshire, Wales

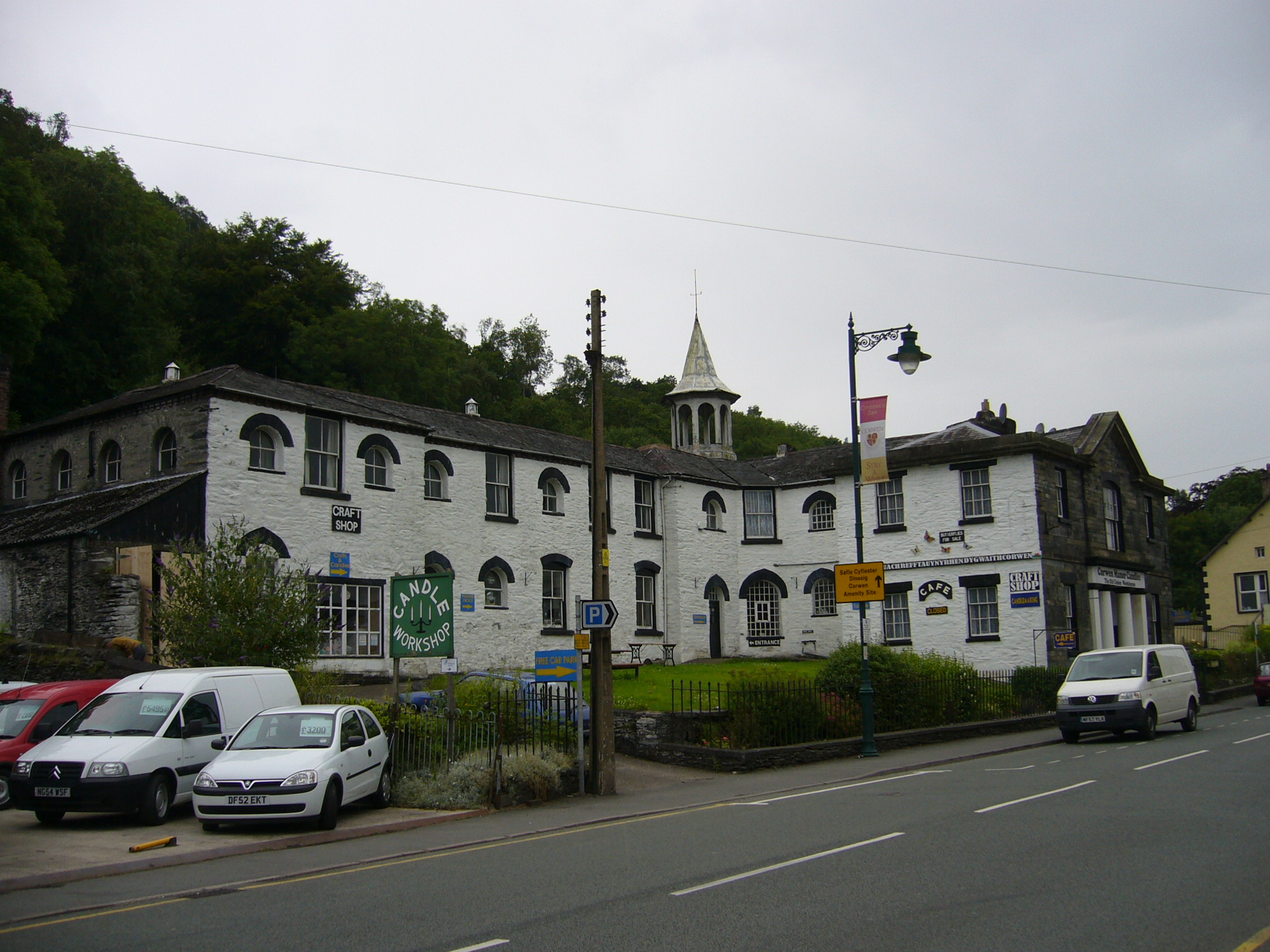
- The former workhouse of the Corwen Poor Law Union on London Road

- Location within Denbighshire
- Area: 69.51 km^{2} (26.84 sq mi)
- Population: 2,325 (2011)
  - Density: 33/km^{2} (85/sq mi)
- OS grid reference: SJ075435
- Community: Corwen
- Principal area: Denbighshire
- Preserved county: Clwyd
- Country: Wales
- Sovereign state: United Kingdom
- Post town: CORWEN
- Postcode district: LL21
- Dialling code: 01490
- Police: North Wales
- Fire: North Wales
- Ambulance: Welsh
- UK Parliament: Dwyfor Meirionnydd
- Senedd Cymru – Welsh Parliament: Clwyd South
- List of places UK Wales Denbighshire 52.980°N 3.379°W Map of the community

Corwen is a town and community in the county of Denbighshire in Wales. Historically, Corwen was part of the county of Merionethshire. Corwen stands on the banks of the River Dee beneath the Berwyn mountains. The town is situated 10 miles (16 km) west of Llangollen and 13 miles (21 km) south of Ruthin. At the 2011 Census, Corwen (community and ward) had a population of 2,325, decreasing slightly from the 2001 population of 2,398, The community, with an area of 69.51 km^{2} (26.84 sq mi), includes Corwen and the surrounding villages of Carrog, Clawdd Poncen and Glyndyfrdwy. The Office for National Statistics identifies Corwen Built-up area with a 2011 population of 477 and an area of 0.25 km^{2} (0.097 sq mi).

== History ==
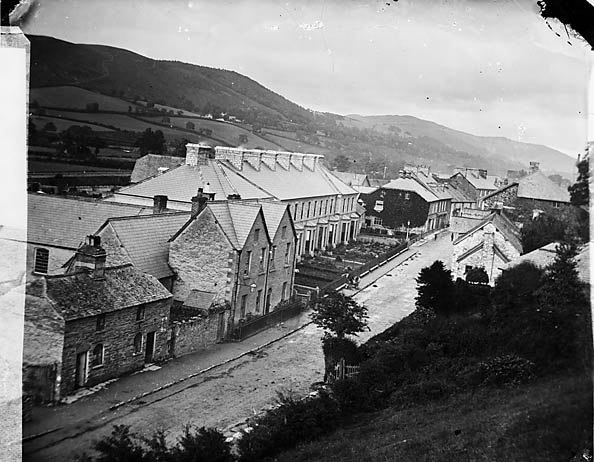
Corwen, circa 1875

Corwen is best known for its connections with Owain Glyndŵr, who was proclaimed Prince of Wales on 16 September 1400, from his nearby manor of Glyndyfrdwy, which began his fourteen-year rebellion against English rule.

A statue of Glyndŵr by the sculptor Simon van de Put was installed in The Square in Corwen in 1995, and in 2007 it was replaced with a larger equestrian statue by Colin Spofforth. It commemorates the day he was proclaimed the last true Prince of Wales in 1400.

The town grew as a centre for cattle drovers. Attractions in Corwen include the motte of a Norman castle, the thirteenth-century Church of St Mael and St Sulien and the Capel Rûg built in 1637 by William Salesbury.

Corwen Golf Club (now defunct) was founded in 1909. The club closed at the onset of World War II.

== Economy ==
Located in the hills of north Wales, the main economy of Corwen is based in and around farming. The town's main employer is local trailer manufacturer Ifor Williams Trailers, started by a farmer looking to transport sheep to the local market.

== Transport ==
In the 1860s Corwen was linked to the national rail network in 1864 by a line from Ruthin along the Vale of Clwyd and in 1865 with a Great Western Railway branch line along the Dee valley from Ruabon. The station was a vital development in the town's importance as the centre of the local agriculture industry. Unfortunately neither survived the Beeching Axe in the 1960s. The town is now linked to the Llangollen Railway. A temporary station, Corwen East (Welsh: Dwyrain Corwen), was opened in 2014, with a new permanent Corwen station opened in June 2023, alongside the town's main car-park near the town centre.

Bus services in Corwen were primarily provided by GHA Coaches with routes available to Wrexham via Llangollen on services 5 and T3, Barmouth via Bala and Dolgellau on service T3 (now operated by Lloyds Coaches), and to Ruthin on service X5 (now operated by Arriva Buses Wales), with through services continuing to Denbigh. Llew Jones operate a twice daily, weekday service to Llanrwst with one journey extended to/from Bala.

Corwen is the last sizeable settlement on the A5 road from London to Holyhead until Betws-y-Coed is reached. Because of this it still contains a number of hotels which were used in the past as coaching inns for the mail coach and stagecoaches. Although the A5 is no longer the most important road to Holyhead, having been superseded by the coastal route of the A55, there is still significant traffic travelling through the town centre's narrow main street.

== Governance ==
At the local level, Corwen is governed by Corwen Town Council, with 13 town councillors elected or co-opted from the Lower ward and Upper ward of the town.

Corwen had its own electoral ward to Denbighshire County Council, until the 2022 local elections. The ward elected one county councillor. Plaid Cymru councillor, Huw "Chick" Jones, died in office in 2020, leading to a by-election in March 2021 which was won by Plaid Cymru's Alan Hughes.

In 2022 the ward was merged with the neighbouring Llandrillo ward, to be named Edeirnion, electing two councillors. Hughes was one of the successful candidates at the 2022 Denbighshire County Council election.

== Culture ==
Corwen hosted the National Eisteddfod in 1919. The Pavilion in the town, which was pulled down in 2015, played an important part in Welsh culture throughout the 20th century. It hosted several concerts and eisteddfodau. It was also the venue for the first concerts performed by Edward H. Dafis, the first Welsh-language rock band to receive significant press notice, in August 1973.

In 1938, Elena Puw Morgan, then living in Annedd Wen, Corwen, became the first woman to win the Literary Medal for her novel Y Graith (The Scar) at the National Eisteddfod in Cardiff.

Novelist John Cowper Powys (1872-1963) lived in Corwen with his common-law wife Phyllis Playter from 1935 until 1955, when they moved to Blaenau Ffestiniog. He wrote two major novels both set in this region of Wales, while living in Corwen, Owen Glendower (1940) and Porius (1951), amongst other works of both fiction and non-fiction. In 1940 he began a novel set in contemporary Corwen but gave it up, to start his "Romance of Corwen", Porius: A Romance of the Dark Ages, in January 1942, the action of which takes place in 499 AD.

== Notable residents ==
- John Cowper Powys (1872–1963) philosopher, lecturer, novelist, critic and poet; moved to Corwen in 1935, where he set two novels
- Elena Puw Morgan (1900–1973), writer, in 1938 was the first woman to win the Literary Medal at the National Eisteddfod with the novel Y Graith (The Scar)
- Frank Serpico (born 1936), a retired New York Police Department detective, lived in Orissor College from 1979 to 1980.
- Sarah Green (born 1982), businesswoman and politician, MP for Chesham and Amersham since 2021.
- Hywel Lloyd (born 1985) motor-racing driver with British Formula 3
- Harry Wilson (born 1997) Welsh footballer, dubbed “The King of Corwen”
