= Moel y Gaer, Bodfari =

Iron Age hillfort in Denbighshire, Wales

Moel y Gaer
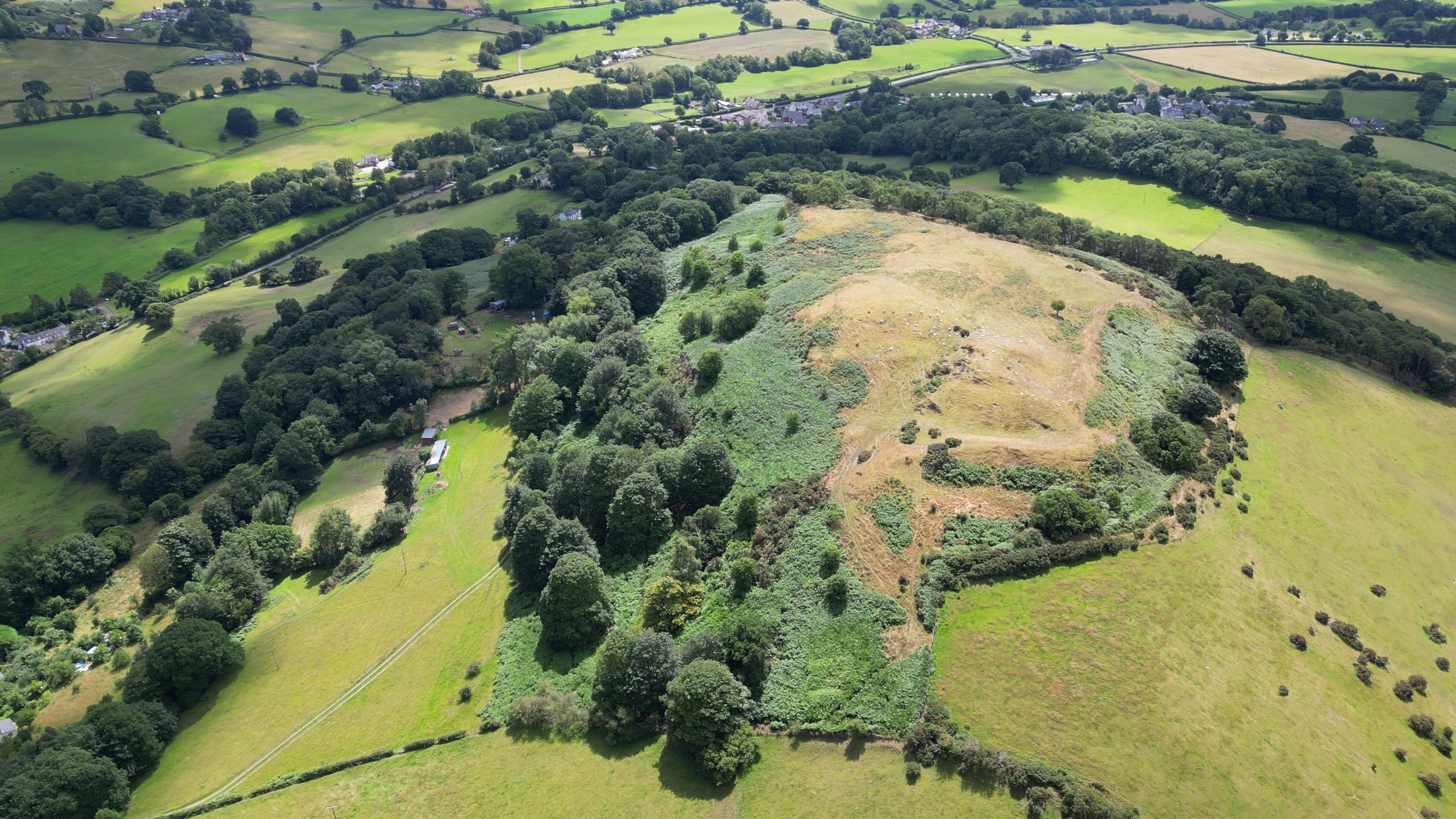
- Aerial view of Moel y Gaer

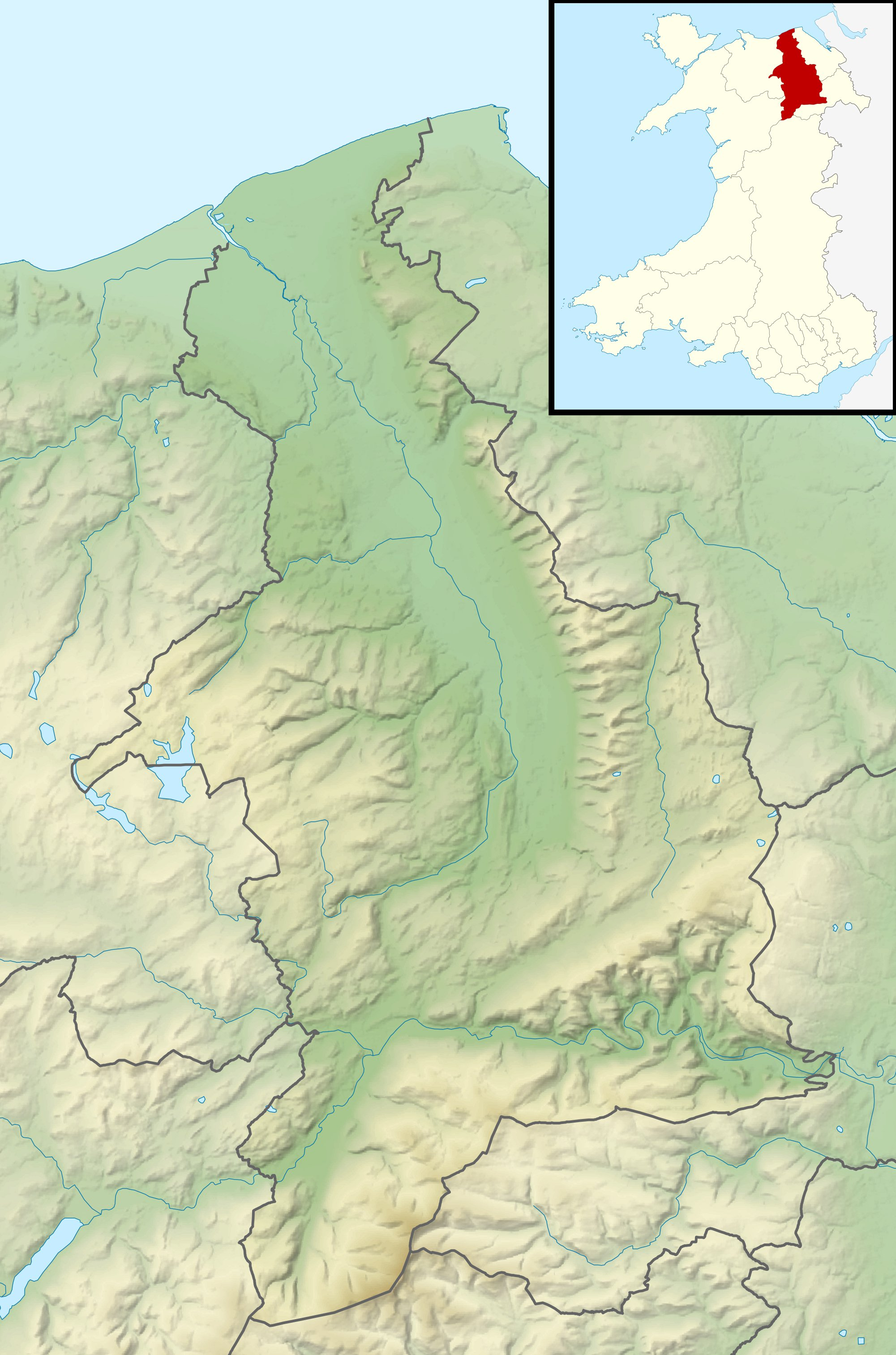
- Location in Denbighshire
- 53.2266°N 3.3570°W
- Type: hillfort
- Location: Denbighshire, Wales
- OS grid reference: SJ 0950 7080

Site notes
- Elevation: 200 metres (660 ft)

Scheduled monument
- Official name: Moel y Gaer
- Reference no.: FL073
- Community: Bodfari

Moel y Gaer (Welsh for "bald hill of the fortress") is an Iron Age hillfort at the northern end of the Clwydian Range, located on a summit overlooking the valley of the River Wheeler, near the village of Bodfari, Denbighshire, Wales, five miles north-east of Denbigh. The site is a scheduled monument, classified as a prehistoric defensive hillfort.

The hillfort is one of a chain of six hillforts in the Clwydian Range, which are, from north to south, Moel Hiraddug, Moel y Gaer Bodfari, Penycloddiau, Moel Arthur, Moel y Gaer Llanbedr, and Moel Fenlli. Moel y Gaer Bodfari is the lowest of these hillforts, being just 200 m (656 ft) above sea level. The hill on which it stands is surrounded by lower land and is strategically situated at the confluence of the River Wheeler and the Clwyd. Offa's Dyke Path passes along the foot of the hill.

The fort at Moel y Gaer is one of the smallest of the chain of defensive works found along the Clwydians. It probably dates from the Iron Age, although there is no definitive evidence to establish the exact period during which it was occupied. It has a single entrance on its northern side and is defended by a steep slope on the eastern side of the hill.

Excavation started in 2011 and is ongoing as of 2016. The area enclosed by the ramparts is about two hectares. Various anomalies have been targeted in the excavations, including what is possibly a group of pits and other features where the ground seems to have been dug out, as well as what seems to be a roundhouse on a levelled piece of land. Examination of the middle rampart began in 2013, and it seems that there may have been several phases in its construction.

== See also ==
- List of hillforts in Wales
