= Moel y Gaer, Llanbedr =

Iron Age hillfort in Denbighshire, Wales

Moel-y-Gaer Camp
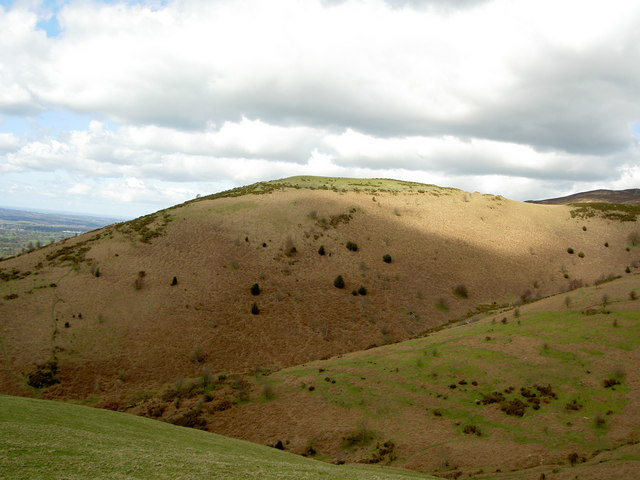
- View of Moel y Gaer from the south

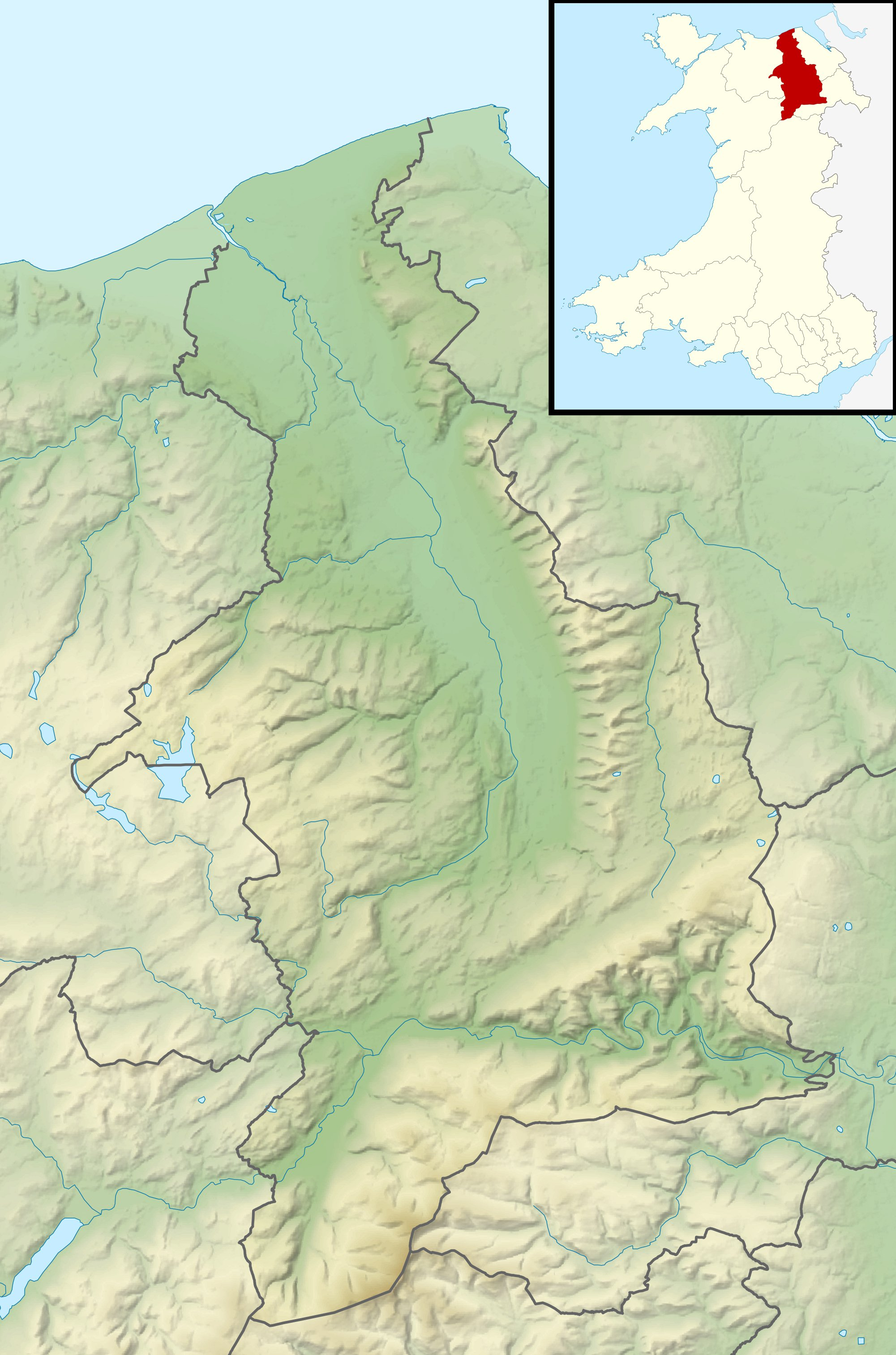
- Location in Denbighshire
- 53.1461°N 3.2744°W
- Type: hillfort
- Location: Denbighshire, Wales
- OS grid reference: SJ 1490 6175

Site notes
- Elevation: 320 metres (1,050 ft)

Scheduled monument
- Official name: Moel-y-Gaer Camp
- Reference no.: DE010
- Community: Llanbedr-Dyffryn-Clwyd

Moel y Gaer (Welsh for "bald hill of the fortress"), also known as Moel-y-Gaer Camp or Moel y Gaer Hillfort, is an Iron Age hillfort located on a western spur of the Clwydian Range, near the village of Llanbedr, Denbighshire, Wales. The site is a scheduled monument, classified as a prehistoric defensive hillfort.

The hillfort is one of a chain of six hillforts in the Clwydian Range, which are, from north to south, Moel Hiraddug, Moel y Gaer Bodfari, Penycloddiau, Moel Arthur, Moel y Gaer Llanbedr, and Moel Fenlli.

== Description ==
Moel y Gaer hillfort is surrounded by steep slopes to the north, west, and south. To the east the approach is almost level and is where the main entrance is sited. There is also a non-functional entrance to the west. Most of the fort is surrounded by a double bank and ditch, with additional banks to the northeast, near the entrance, across the ridge connecting the hill to the higher ground leading to Moel Famau.

The hillfort is approximately oval, measuring about 200 metres (660 ft) north-south by 180 metres (590 ft) west-east. The main enclosure is a rounded triangle with an area of 2.63 hectares (6.5 acres), with an annex to the north of 0.26 hectares (0.64 acres), giving a total area of 2.89 hectares (7.1 acres).

At a height of 320 metres (1,050 ft) up to 345 metres (1,132 ft) Moel y Gaer is much lower than the other hillforts in the chain and is also unusual in that it is not sited on the ridge of the range. However, it is in a commanding position over the Vale of Clwyd.

The site has suffered from some agricultural damage in the 1980s and also some damage from sheep and rabbit warrens.

== Excavations and surveys ==
The hillfort was investigated in 1849 by W. Wynne-Ffoulkes. He dug a number of small trenches and concluded that the eastern entrance had been paved and that the inner rampart was built of stone or fronted with stone. He also found an area with large amounts of highly burnt stone. Various artefacts discovered at the site have since been lost.

More recently, in 2007, a topographic survey was carried out for the Heather and Hillforts Project. The survey identified 15 roundhouse platforms within the enclosure, along with possible evidence that the inner rampart was faced with stone at some time during the site's occupation. The survey also found evidence of a major period of burning, with fragments of burnt stone in several places and also a block of vitrified material.

In 2008 a geophysical survey was carried out as part of an "Archaeology Uncovered" event, with members of the public carrying out the field work. The work included magnetic susceptibility, fluxgate gradiometer, and resistivity surveys. The surveys identified a number of possible features, including a potentially paved path and a number of potential lines of stone walls.

In 2009 a team from Bangor University, in collaboration with the Heather and Hillforts Project, excavated two trenches at the site. The excavations also acted as a field school for students from Bangor and from the University of Vienna, Austria, and as a community archaeology project.

The study tentatively suggests that Moel y Gaer hillfort had at least two phases of occupation, an Early Iron Age phase, when the inner rampart was built, and possibly a second (Middle or Late Iron Age) phase, when the outer ramparts were built.

== Conservation ==
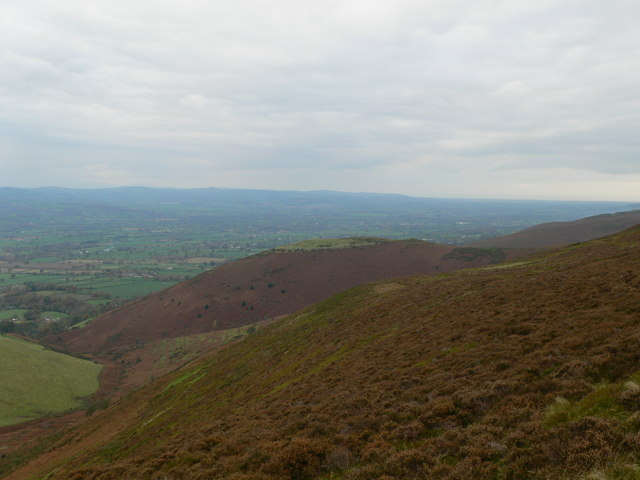
The hillfort seen from the path to Moel Famau from Bwlch Pen Barras

As well as being a scheduled monument, the hillfort is also protected and managed as part of the Heather and Hillforts Project. The project includes six hillforts: the four most southerly of the hillforts in the Clwydian Range (Penycloddiau, Moel Arthur, Moel y Gaer Llanbedr, and Moel Fenlli) and also Moel y Gaer Llantysilio and Caer Drewyn.

== See also ==
- List of hillforts in Wales
