= Moel Gyw =

Hill in Denbighshire, Wales

Coordinates: 53.10822°N 3.23982°W

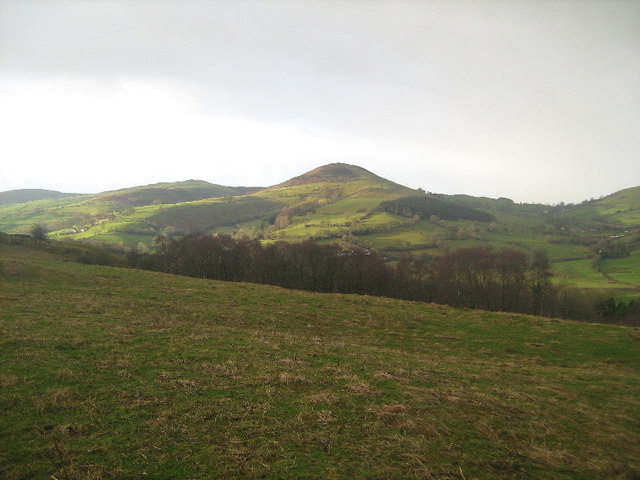
- Moel Gyw (centre)

Highest point
- Elevation: 467 m (1,532 ft)
- Prominence: 181 m (594 ft)
- Parent peak: Moel Famau
- Listing: Marilyn

Naming
- English translation: chick hill
- Language of name: Welsh
- Pronunciation: Welsh: [ˈmɔil ˈɡɪu]

Geography
- Location: Denbighshire, Wales
- Parent range: Clwydian Range
- OS grid: SJ171575
- Topo map: OS Landranger 116

Moel Gyw is a hill in Denbighshire, North Wales and forms part of the Clwydian Range. It is situated just to the south of Moel Famau and Foel Fenlli.

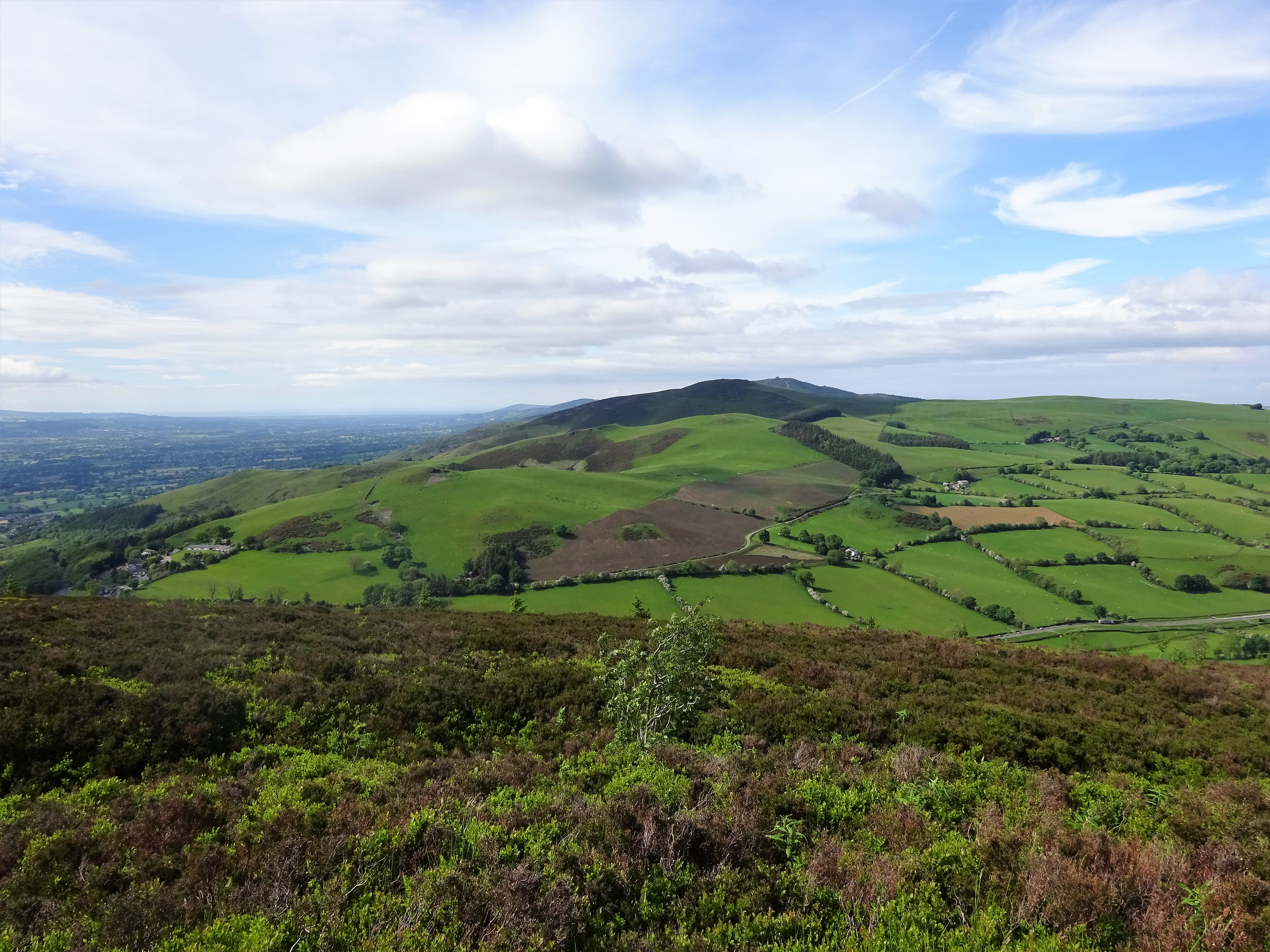
View from the Foel Gyw summit
