= Lon Clwyd =

Incomplete cycling route in North Wales

Cyclists travelling towards Rhyl

Lon Clwyd is the name of a partially completed cycle route running South from the North Wales coast. It currently links Rhyl (where it joins National Cycle Route 5) to Rhuddlan, but has not yet been extended to communities further south such as Denbigh and Ruthin.

== Rhyl - Rhuddlan ==
A traffic-free route follows the East bank of the River Clwyd. It has a good surface but progress is hampered by gates constructed across the track which require frequent dismounting and remounting.

== South from Rhuddlan ==
A cycle track does exist alongside the busy A525 to St Asaph. Further progress south is only possible on busy and fast roads. Denbighshire County Council did commission a route survey from Richard Broun Associates in 1999 to create a safe traffic free cycle path largely using the track bed of the former Vale of Clwyd railway line but objections from landowners saw the plans dropped.
