= Clwydian Way =

122-mile footpath in north-east Wales

- Length: 122 mi (196 km)
- Location: Conwy, Denbighshire, Flintshire
- Use: Hiking

The Clwydian Way (Welsh: Taith Clwyd) is a waymarked long-distance footpath in north-east Wales, mostly running through Denbighshire.

== Distance ==
The waymarked circular walk runs for a total of 122 miles (196 km). It was established by the North Wales area of the Rambler's Association to mark the Millennium.

== The route ==
The route starts in Prestatyn on the North Wales coast and passes through Ruthin, Llangollen, Corwen, St. Asaph, Denbigh and Rhuddlan.

=== Places on the route ===
The route passes through or near the following places and landmarks:

- Prestatyn
- Trelawnyd
- Rhuallt
- Tremeirchion
- Bodfari
- Moel Arthur
- Moel Dywyll
- Moel Famau
- Cilcain
- Loggerheads
- Maeshafn
- Eryrys
- Graig quarry
- Llandegla
- Castell Dinas Brân
- Llangollen
- Horseshoe Falls
- Carrog
- Corwen
- Betws Gwerfil Goch
- Llanfihangel Glyn Myfyr
- Clocaenog Forest
- Llyn Brenig
- Llyn Aled
- Aled Isaf Reservoir
- Llansannan
- Henllan
- Denbigh
- St Asaph
- Cwm
- Dyserth
- Graig Fawr
- Meliden
- Prestatyn
