= Moel y Gaer =

Moel y Gaer (also Moel-y-Gaer or Moel-y-gaer) may refer to any of several prehistoric hillforts in Wales:

- Moel y Gaer, Bodfari, on a hill overlooking the Wheeler Valley in Denbighshire
- Moel y Gaer, Llanbedr, on a western spur of the Clwydian Range in Denbighshire
- Moel y Gaer, Llantysilio, on Llantysilio Mountain in Denbighshire
- Moel y Gaer, Rhosesmor, on Halkyn Mountain in Flintshire
