= Penycloddiau =

Hill in Flintshire, Wales

Coordinates: 53.20008°N 3.30834°W

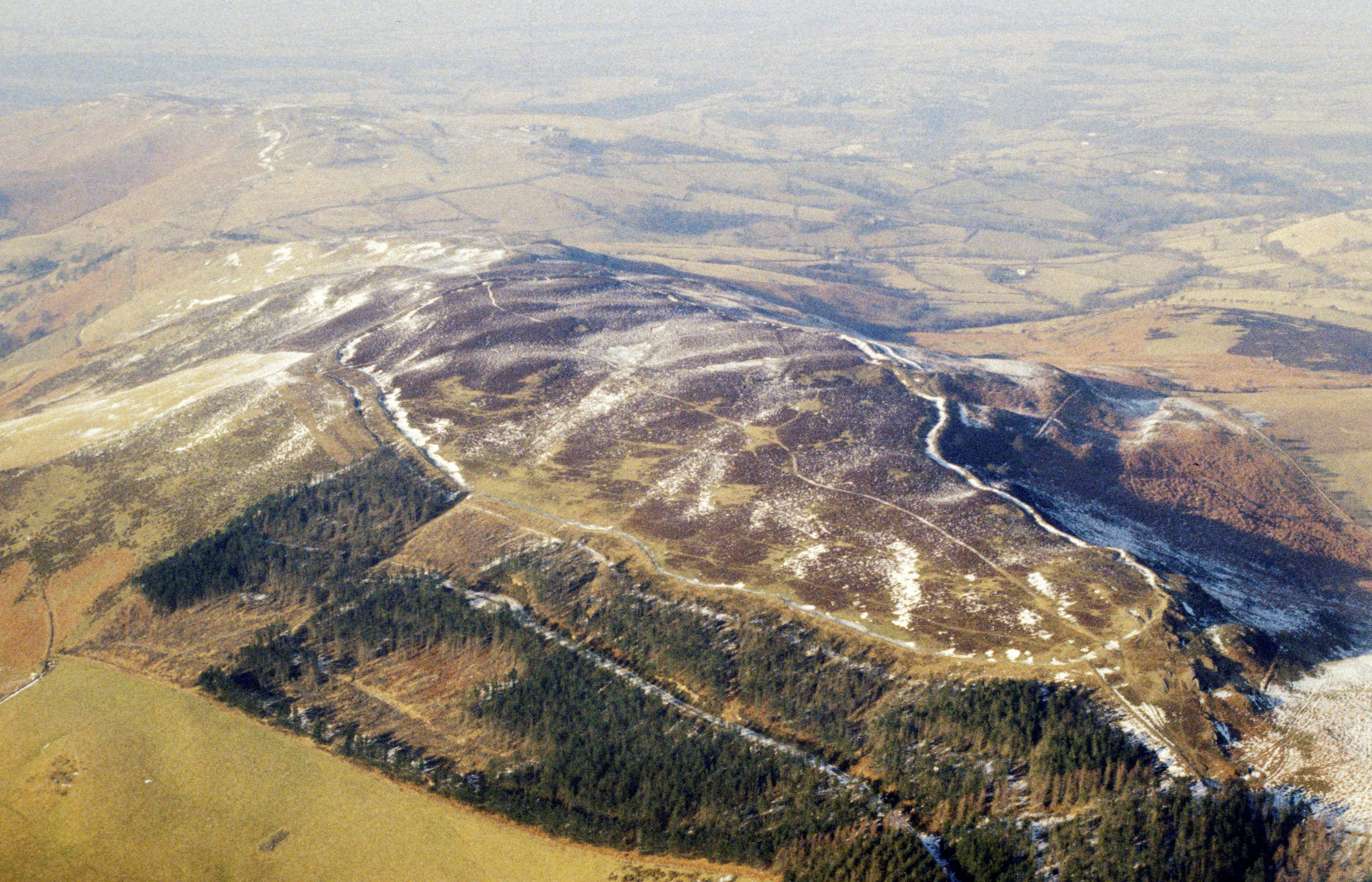
- Penycloddiau hill fort

Highest point
- Elevation: 440 m (1,440 ft)
- Prominence: 156 m (512 ft)
- Parent peak: Moel Famau
- Listing: Marilyn

Naming
- English translation: hill of the trenches
- Language of name: Welsh
- Pronunciation: Welsh: [pɛnəˈklɔðjai]

Geography
- Location: Flintshire, Wales
- Parent range: Clwydian Range
- OS grid: SJ127678
- Topo map: OS Landranger 116

Penycloddiau is a hill in Flintshire, Wales, and one of five Marilyns in the Clwydian Range.

The hill, like Foel Fenlli and Moel Arthur to the south, has an Iron Age hillfort at its summit. It covers 26 hectares (64 acres) making it one of the largest hillforts in Wales. In 2017, excavations by the Clywdian Range Archaeology Group (CRAG) unearthed a significant number of 4,000-year-old stone tools from the Bronze Age, the discovery indicates human activity occurred much earlier than first thought in the area.

Penycloddiau is crossed by the Offa's Dyke Path and the Clwydian Way, two long distance footpaths that traverse the hills in this area. A free car park exists at the bwlch between Penycloddiau and Moel Arthur, where two footpaths lead to the summit.

== Gallery ==
A view of the outer defence wall at Penycloddiau hill fort

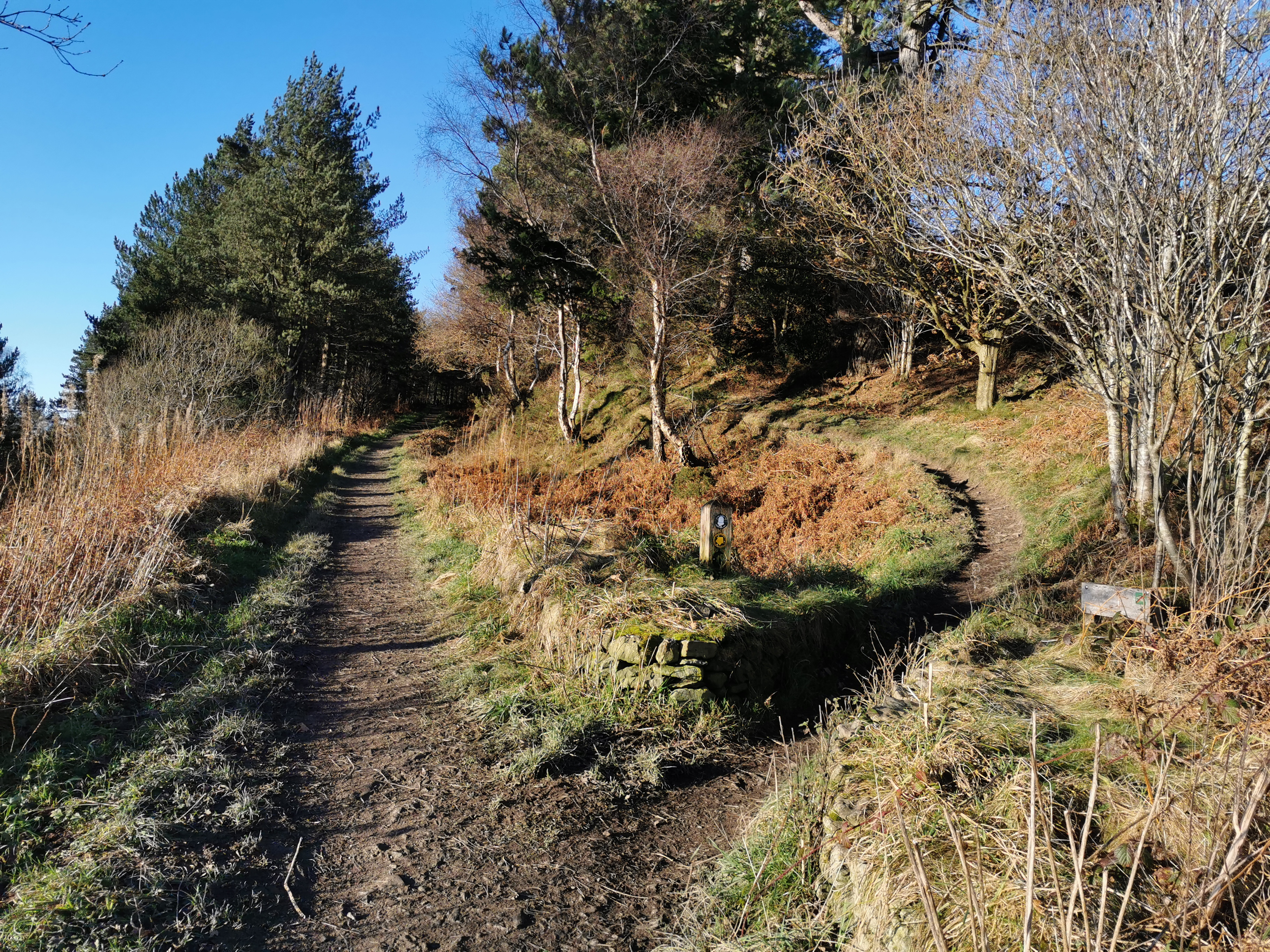
The Offa's Dyke Path climbs Penycloddiau from the east

== See also ==
- List of hillforts in Wales
