= River Elwy =

River in North Wales

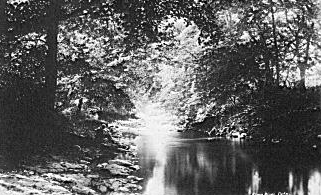
- A view of the river in the 1860s by Francis Bedford (1816–1894)
- Native name: Afon Elwy (Welsh)

Location
- Country: Wales

Physical characteristics
- Source
  - location: Llangernyw
- Mouth: confluence with River Clwyd

The River Elwy (Welsh: Afon Elwy) is a river in Wales forming a tributary to the River Clwyd. Though the source of the river may be on the northern flank of Moel Seisiog, south-east of Llanrwst, the river only receives the name Elwy at the village of Llangernyw, where three rivers meet.

== Route ==
The source of the river is sometimes said to be on the northern flank of Moel Seisiog, south-east of Llanrwst, at Ordnance Survey grid reference SH 853593. However the river only receives the name Elwy at the village of Llangernyw, where three rivers, Afon Cledwen, Afon Collen and Afon Gallen, meet to form the Elwy.

It flows eastwards through Llanfair Talhaiarn and a few miles downstream from this village it is joined by a tributary, the River Aled (Afon Aled) which has its source in Llyn Aled.

A 200-metre section of the river north of Llannefydd (53.240°N 3.523°W) was in the news in 2026 after its course had shifted dramatically to the south in the space of a few years.

After passing through Bont-newydd, the river turns northwards again and flows through St Asaph (Welsh: Llanelwy, 'the church enclosure on the Elwy'). It joins the River Clwyd about halfway between St Asaph and Rhuddlan, and the waters of the two rivers can often be seen flowing side by side for several miles.

== Caves and archaeological remains ==
A number of caves along the lower valley of the Elwy are of great archaeological interest and are considered one of the most important groups of Palaeolithic and later caves and rock shelters in Britain. In particular Pontnewydd Cave contained remains of Neanderthal man and is the most north-westerly site at which Neanderthal remains have been found.

== Fishing ==
The Elwy is also well known for its sea trout (sewin) fishing, and also has a run of Atlantic Salmon. Rhyl and St Asaph Angling Association control 20 miles of river fishing on the rivers Elwy, Clwyd and Aled. In recent years including the recent 2017 season there have been good reported catches of wild brown trout most of which are returned unharmed on a voluntary catch and release system. In 2017 a wild trout weighing 5½ lbs was caught and released on a river Elwy beat owned by the angling association.
