= Moel y Parc =

Hill on the border between Denbighshire and Flintshire in Wales

Coordinates: 53.2197°N 3.3204°W

Highest point
- Elevation: 398 m (1,306 ft)
- Prominence: 91 m (299 ft)
- Parent peak: Moel y Gamelin
- Listing: Sub-HuMP

Geography
- Location: Denbighshire, Flintshire
- Parent range: Clwydian Range

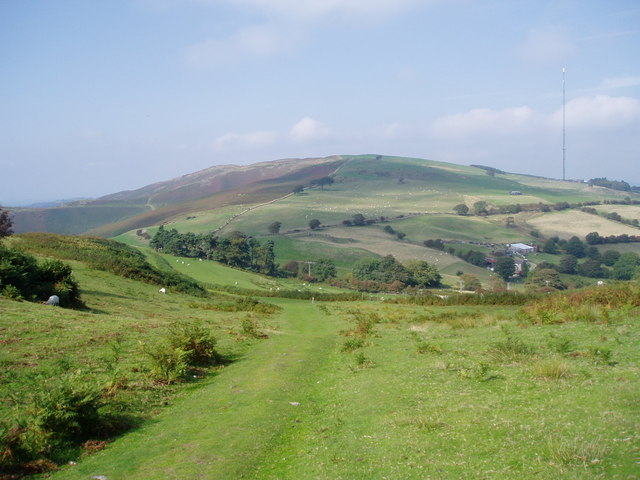
Moel y Parc viewed from the Offa's Dyke Path, with the television mast visible at right

Moel y Parc (sometimes written as Moel-y-Parc) is a hill on the border between Denbighshire and Flintshire in Wales. It is one of the Clwydian Hills, rising 398 metres (1,306 ft) above sea level and is located at OS grid reference SJ114703. There is a television mast near the summit. The summit marks the boundary of Aberwheeler and Ysceifiog communities, and is the site of a cairn and tumulus.
