= Phillida Nicholson =

Welsh-born artist and Land Girl (1924–2021)

- Education: Liverpool College of Art
- Alma mater: Florence Academy of Fine Arts
- Known for: Landscape Painting

Phillida Nicholson (1924–2021) was a Welsh-born artist and Land Girl.

== Early life ==
Phillida Nicholson was born in Bodfari, North Wales. She was the youngest daughter of Molly and Richard Nicholson.

During World War Two, Nicholson served in the Women's Land Army.

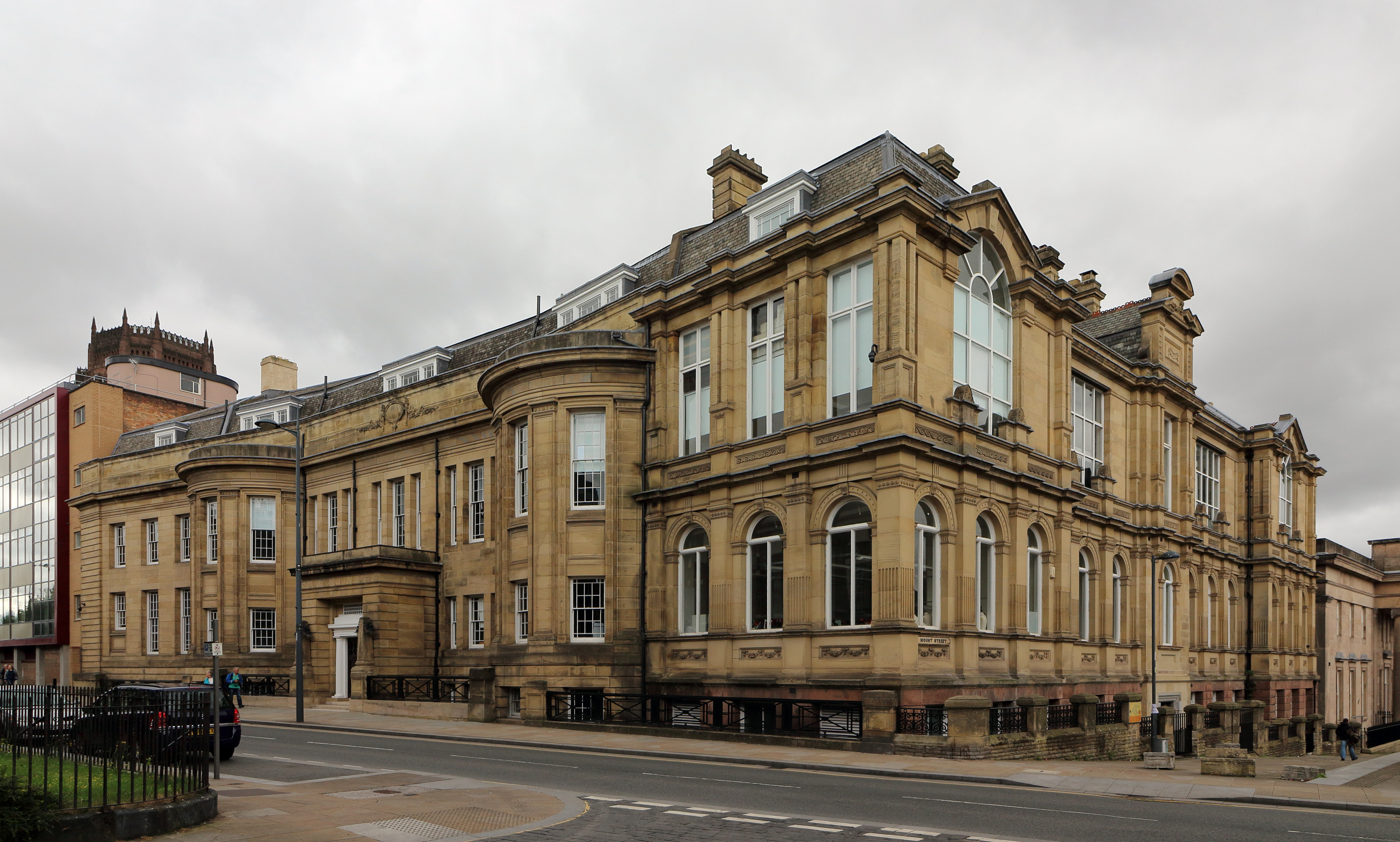
Liverpool College of Art, pictured in 2018.

After the war, Nicholson studied at the Liverpool College of Art. Initially interested in sculpture, she later worked with oil painting and as a tapestry designer. Nicholson furthered her studies at the Florence Academy of Fine Arts, the Académie André Lhote in Paris, and at London University.

== Career ==
Nicholson widely travelled during her career across Europe, Ethiopia, and Australia, and worked as an archaeological artist on British and American digs.

Her work has been exhibited at multiple locations, including the Redfern Gallery, the Piccadilly Gallery and the Leicester Galleries in London, the Minories in Colchester, and the Ashgate Gallery in Farnham, Hampshire, with her paintings touring in Wales between 1953-4 and again in 1964.

=== Notable works ===
The Village (1953), National Museum Wales.

The Shepherd (1956), National Museum Wales.

Bore Llachar, Aberdaron (date unknown), Oriel Mon.

== Later life ==
Nicholson spent her winters in a small studio in Battersea, where she would walk around London and visit galleries.

She developed dementia, and died in early 2021.
