= Aberwheeler =

Village in Denbighshire, Wales

Aberwheeler: Welsh: Aberchwiler
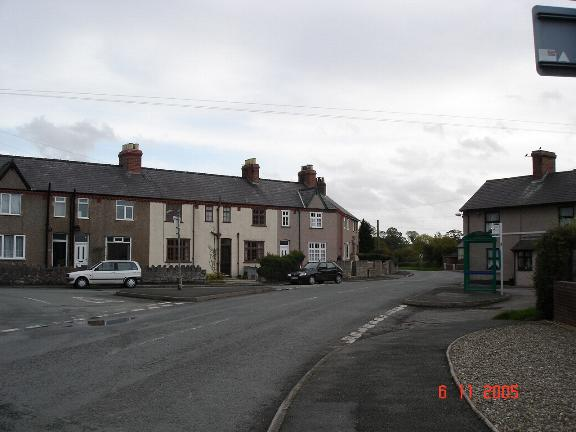
- Aberwheeler

- Location within Denbighshire
- Population: 298 (2011)
- OS grid reference: SJ095693
- Community: Aberwheeler
- Principal area: Denbighshire
- Preserved county: Clwyd
- Country: Wales
- Sovereign state: United Kingdom
- Post town: DENBIGH
- Postcode district: LL16
- Dialling code: 01745
- Police: North Wales
- Fire: North Wales
- Ambulance: Welsh
- UK Parliament: Clwyd East
- Senedd Cymru – Welsh Parliament: Vale of Clwyd
- List of places UK Wales Denbighshire 53.213°N 3.354°W Map of the community

Aberwheeler (Welsh: Aberchwiler) is a village and community in the Welsh county of Denbighshire, located on the south bank of the River Wheeler (Welsh: Afon Chwiler), 4.2 miles (6.8 km) north east of Denbigh, 12.6 miles (20.3 km) north west of Mold and 11.0 miles (17.7 km) north of Ruthin. At the 2001 census the community had a population of 327, reducing to 298 at the 2011 census. The name has been Anglicised from the Welsh.

== History ==
Historically, Aberwheeler formed a township of the ancient parish of Bodfari, which also comprised Maesmynan and Blorant. At one point the manor was owned by Gwenllian. A mill was situated in Aberwheeler from medieval times. Aberwheeler mill was burnt in 1403, though it was later leased to Thomas Londisdale and Henry Billiger in November 1408 on the grounds that they rebuild it. Today, further north, on the banks of the river, stands Candy Mill, a clover mill built to extract clover seed. The mill is Grade II* listed, while Aberwheeler House and Castell Bach are Grade II listed.

== Geography ==
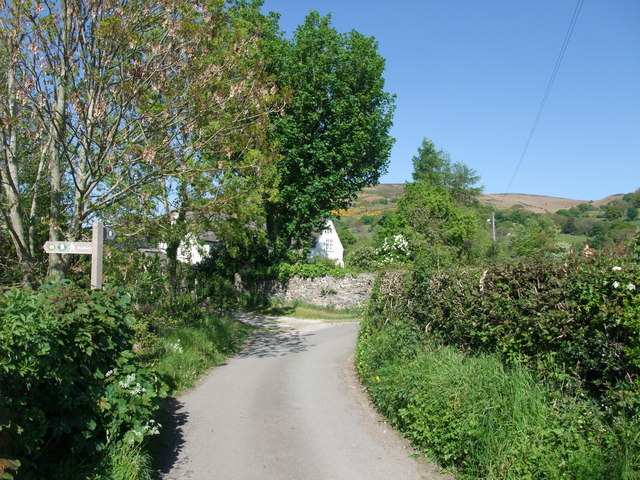
Offa's Dyke Path in Aberwheeler

In the east of the community, the land climbs steeply to the 1,306 feet (398 m) high summit of Moel y Parc on the boundary with Flintshire, where there is a cairn and tumulus. The Offa's Dyke Path, 176 miles (283 km) long, which runs from Sedbury, in Gloucestershire, to Prestatyn, descends through the community from the heights of the Clwydian Range to cross the River Wheeler into Bodfari.

== Notable people ==
- Reverend Edward Williams, clergyman, known as 'the divine', born in Glan Clwyd, Aberwheeler in 1750.
