= Cwm, Denbighshire =

Village in Denbighshire, Wales

Cwm
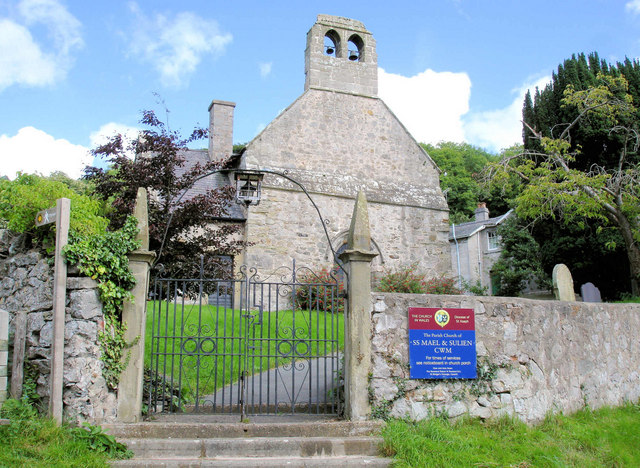
- Cwm church

- Location within Denbighshire
- Population: 378 (2011)
- OS grid reference: SJ066773
- Community: Cwm
- Principal area: Denbighshire
- Country: Wales
- Sovereign state: United Kingdom
- Post town: ST. ASAPH
- Postcode district: LL17
- Post town: RHYL
- Postcode district: LL18
- Dialling code: 01745
- Police: North Wales
- Fire: North Wales
- Ambulance: Welsh
- UK Parliament: Clwyd East
- Senedd Cymru – Welsh Parliament: Vale of Clwyd
- List of places UK Wales Denbighshire 53.285°N 3.401°W Map of the community

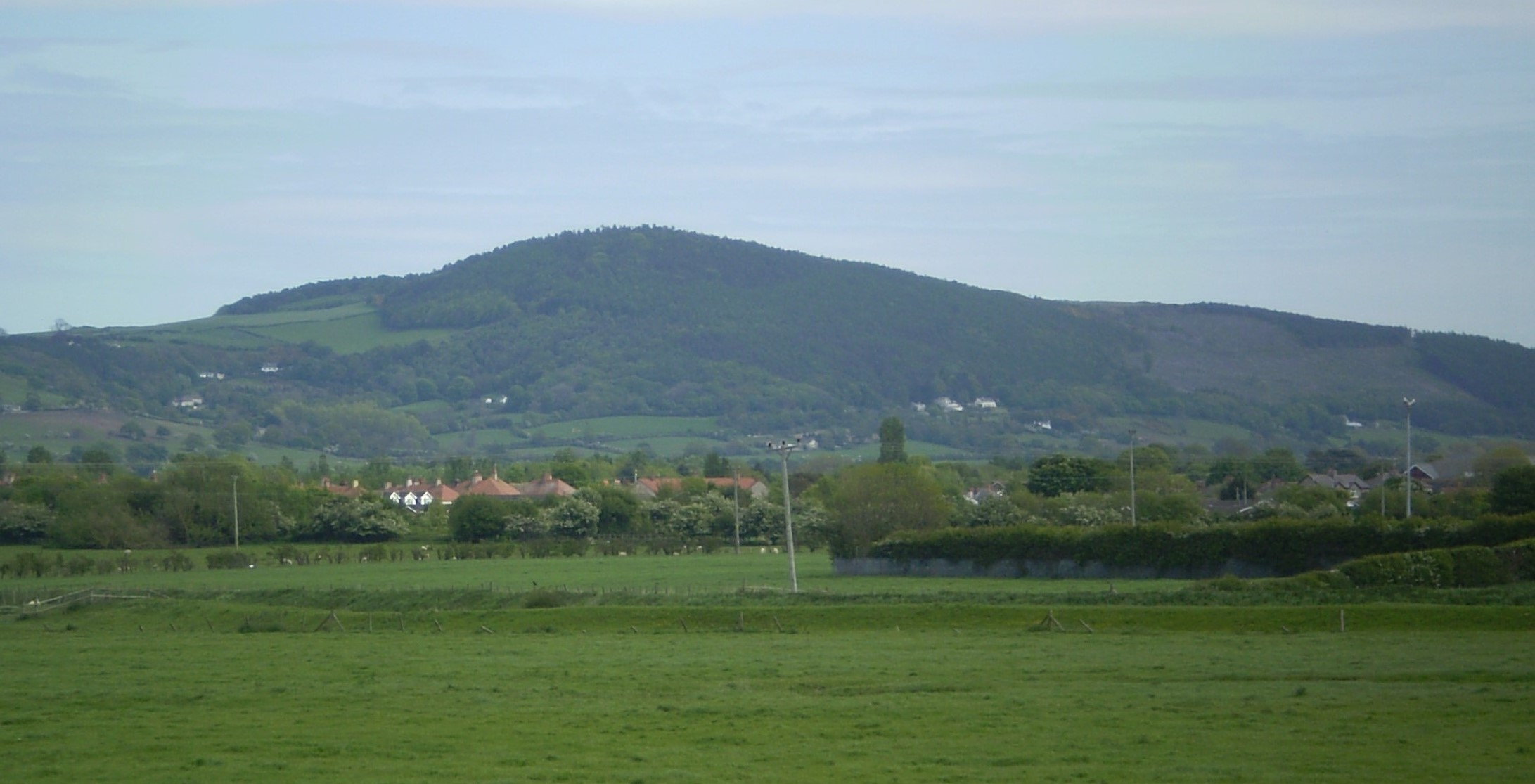
Mynydd y Cwm

Cwm is a village and community in Denbighshire, below the hill Mynydd y Cwm.

The church in Cwm is dedicated to two 6th-century saints, St Mael and St Sulien.

Local councillors have given the go-ahead for a wind turbine to be erected on farmland near Cwm. The 50 kW turbine will be at Marian Mawr and it was voted through with a big majority by Denbighshire County Council.

The community includes the Blue Lion Pub, the settlement of Marian Cwm, and part of Rhuallt.
