= Bodfari =

Village and community in Denbighshire, Wales

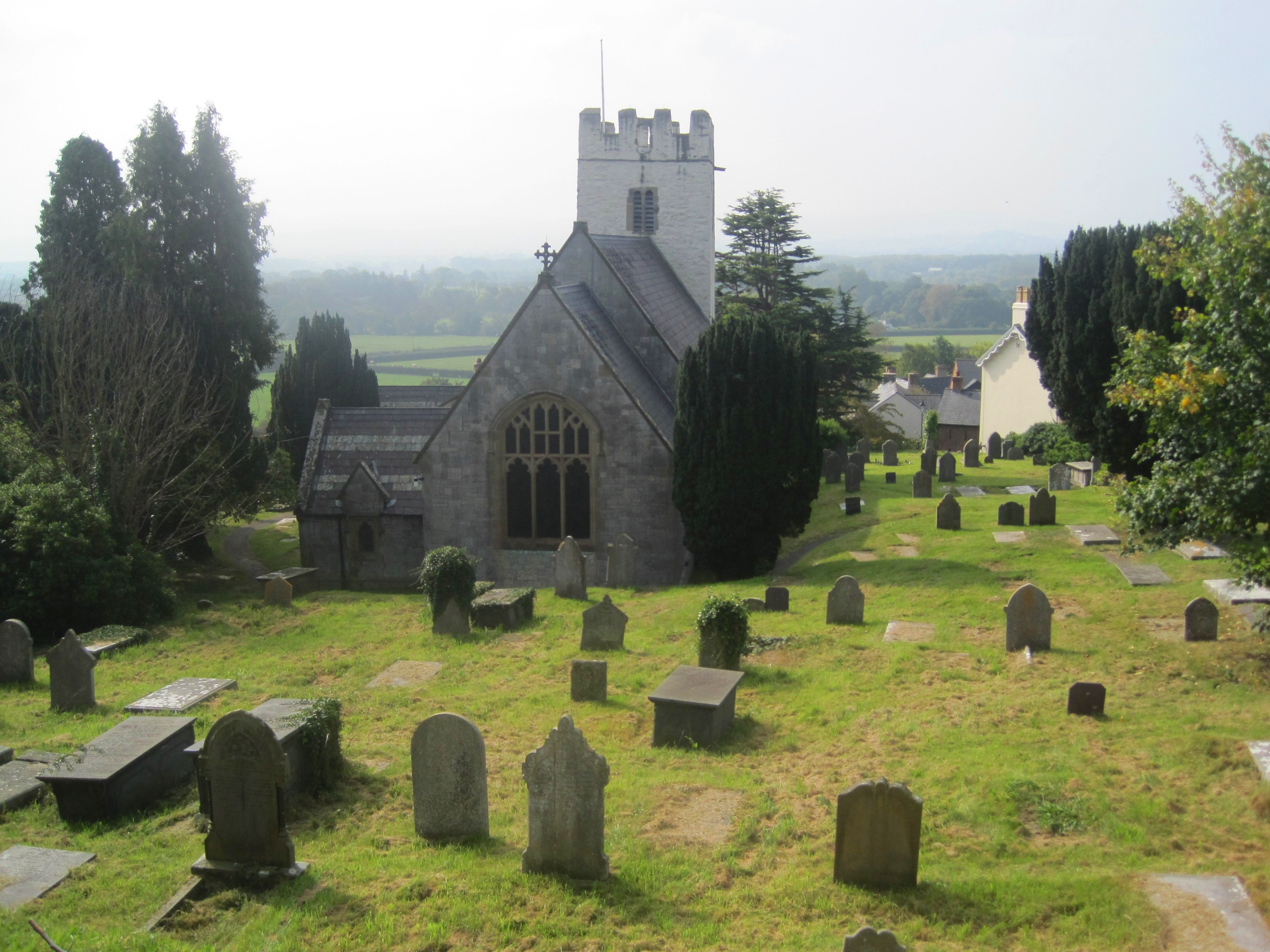
- St Stephen's Parish Church

- Location within Denbighshire
- Population: 327 (2011)
- OS grid reference: SJ093701
- Community: Bodfari
- Principal area: Denbighshire
- Country: Wales
- Sovereign state: United Kingdom
- Post town: DENBIGH
- Postcode district: LL16
- Dialling code: 01745
- Police: North Wales
- Fire: North Wales
- Ambulance: Welsh
- UK Parliament: Clwyd East
- Senedd Cymru – Welsh Parliament: Vale of Clwyd
- Website: bodfaricommunitycouncil.org.uk
- List of places UK Wales Denbighshire 53.220°N 3.361°W Map of the community

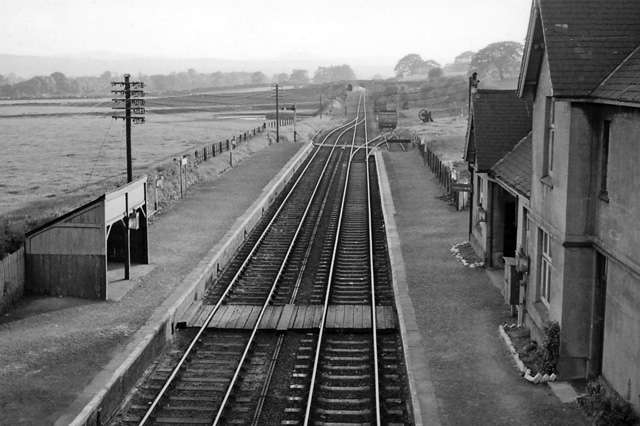
Bodfari had a railway station until 1962

Bodfari is a village and community in Denbighshire, Wales. Until the local government reorganisation of 1974, Bodfari was in the historic county of Flintshire.

The ancient parish of Bodfari comprised the townships of Bodfari and Aberwheeler which was historically in Denbighshire.

== Location ==
The village lies on the A541 road at the point where the road passes through a gap in the Clwydian Hills, the gap being part of the valley of the River Wheeler (Welsh: Afon Chwiler).

The Offa's Dyke National Trail passes through the village, and for walkers completing the trail south to north, Bodfari is usually the final overnight stop on the 177-mile (285 km) route. The Clwydian Way long-distance path also passes the village.

== The parish church ==
Bodfari was the home of Deifer the Recluse, who was visited by Saint Winefrid (Welsh: Gwenfrewy) according to Robert of Shrewsbury. Winifred is said to have left Holywell and visited him before being sent on to Henllan. His commemoration day is given in a few calendars as March 8.

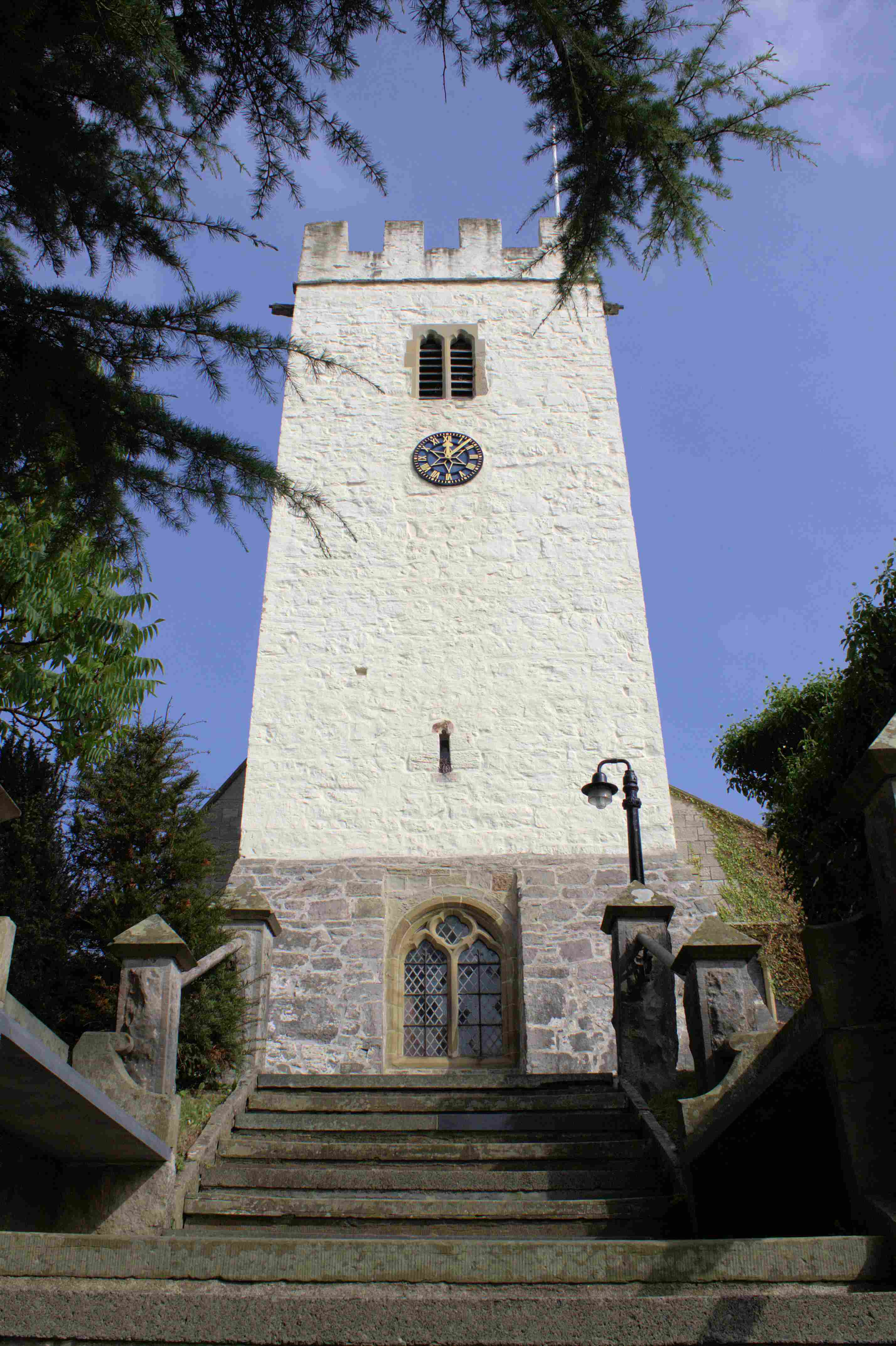

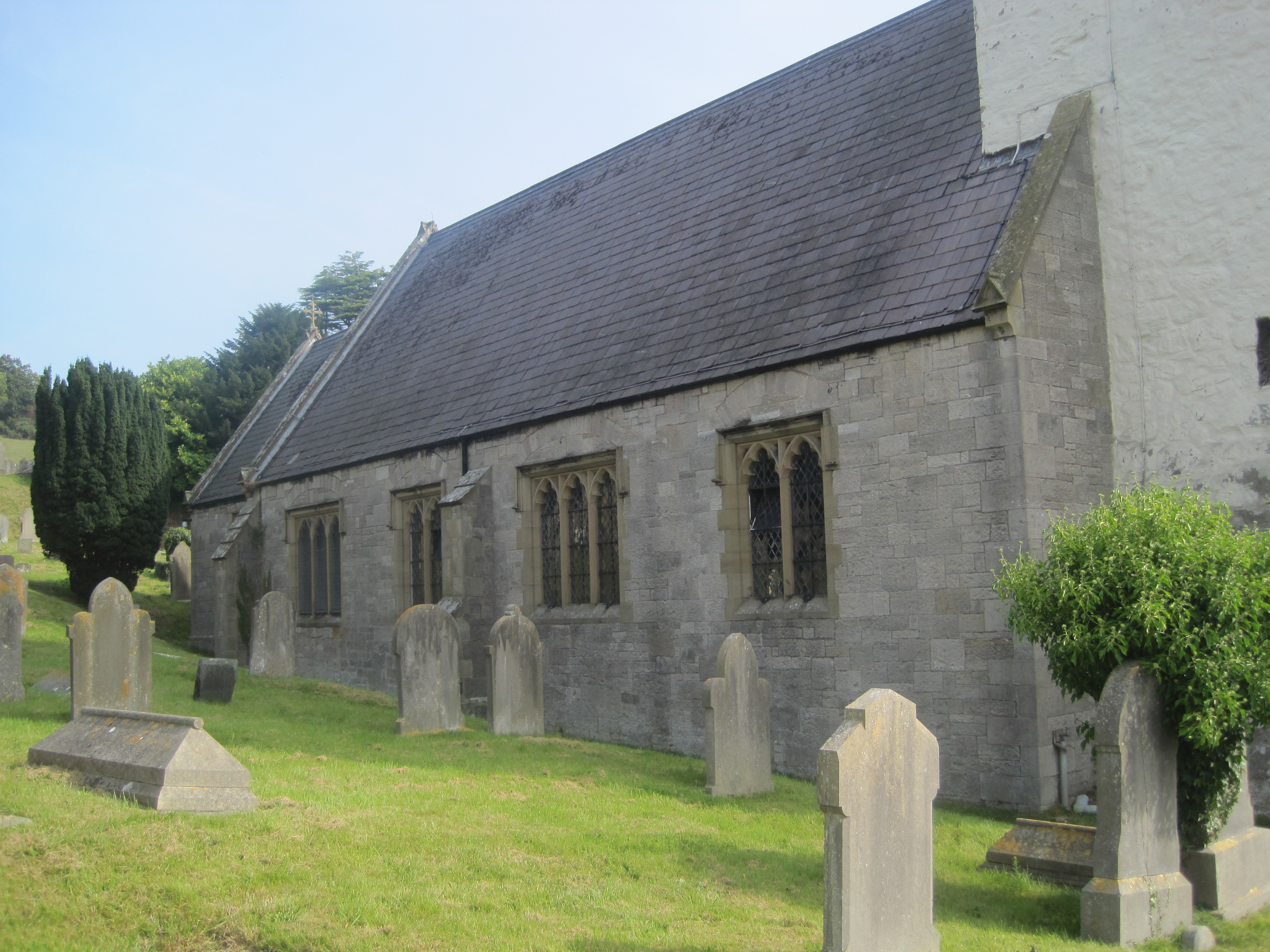

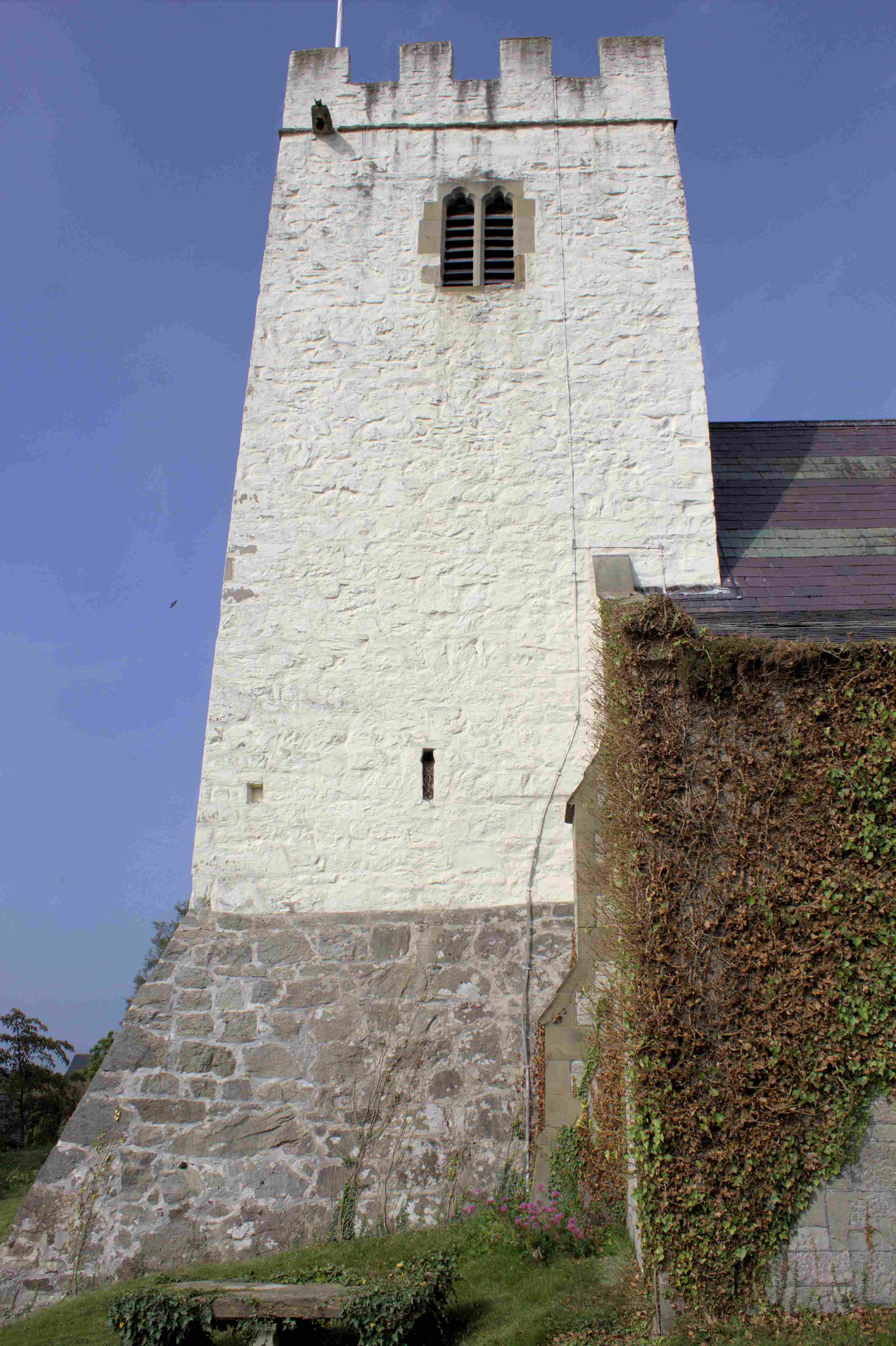

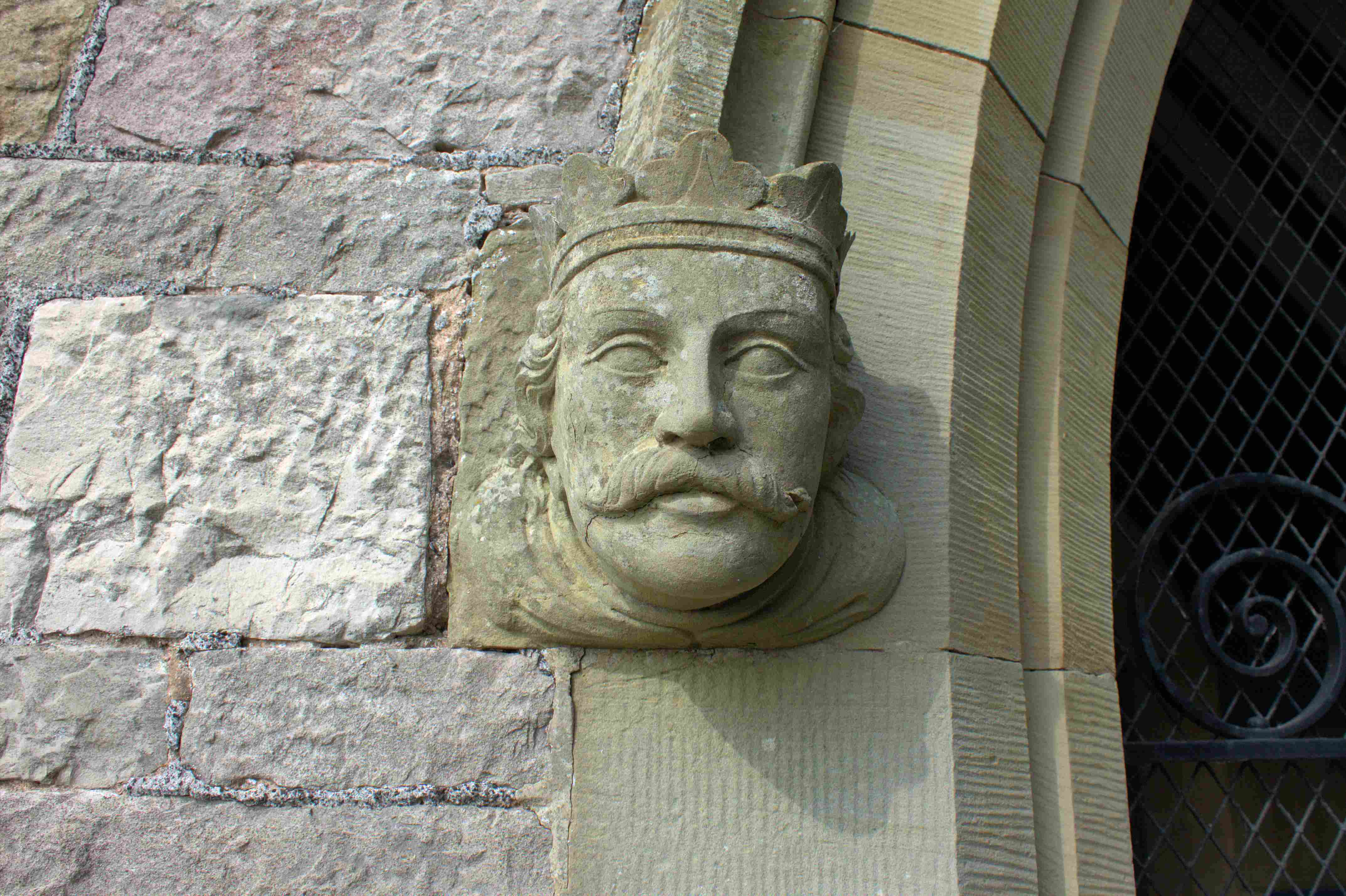

== Notable residents ==
- Phillida Nicholson (1924 - 2021) artist and Land Girl.
- Sian Adey-Jones (born 1957) a former beauty queen and glamour model.
