= River Wheeler =

River in Wales

- Native name: Afon Chwiler (Welsh)

Location
- Country: Wales
- Region: Denbighshire, Flintshire

Physical characteristics
- Source
  - location: south of Nannerch
- Mouth
  - location: River Clwyd
  - coordinates: 53°12′49″N 3°22′44″W

The River Wheeler (Welsh: Afon Chwiler) is a tributary of the River Clwyd in north-east Wales. Rising on the east side of the Clwydian Range, it is a "misfit stream" occupying a deep valley cutting westwards through the range into the Vale of Clwyd. The river enters the Clwyd west of the village of Aberwheeler (Welsh: Aberchwiler), the name of which signifies "the mouth or confluence of the Wheeler". The river is followed for its entire length by the A541 road running from Mold to Trefnant and was formerly followed by the Mold and Denbigh Junction Railway. Besides Aberchwiler, the river passes through or beside the villages of Nannerch, Afon-wen and Bodfari.

There are numerous workings, both active and abandoned, for sand and gravel within the Wheeler valley, a legacy of the last ice age, when the valley carried considerable quantities of glacial meltwater.
