= River Clwyd =

River in Wales

Coordinates: 53.07017°N 3.42679°W

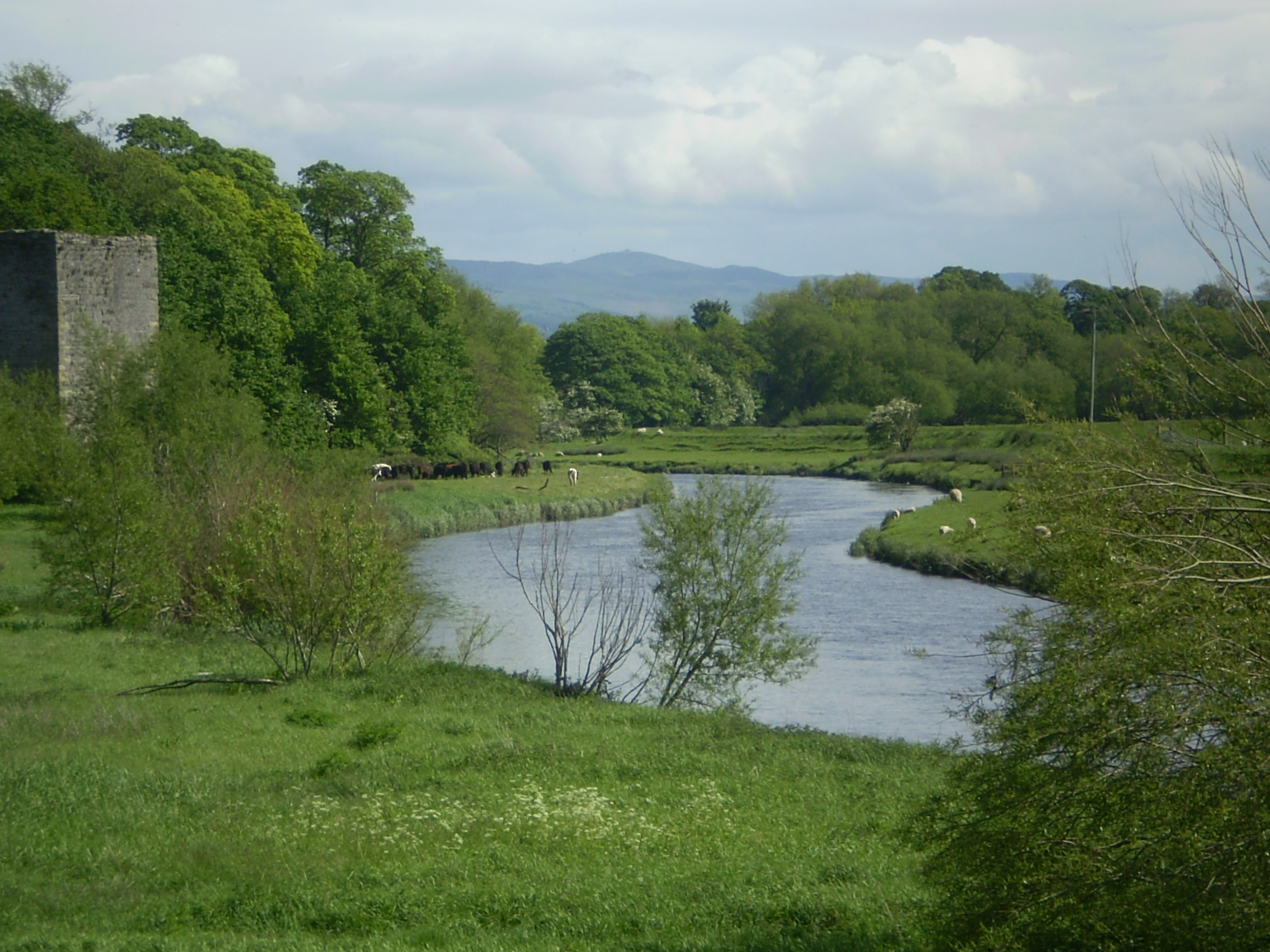
- River Clwyd by Rhuddlan Castle, Moel Famau in distance
- Native name: Afon Clwyd (Welsh)

Location
- Country: Wales
- Region: Denbighshire

Physical characteristics
- Source
  - location: Clocaenog Forest
- Mouth
  - location: Liverpool Bay near Rhyl, Wales
- Length: 35 mi (56 km)

Basin features
- Tributaries
  - left: Elwy
  - right: Wheeler

The River Clwyd (/ˈkluːɪd/ KLOO-id; Welsh: Afon Clwyd, pronounced [ˈklʊɨd]) is a river in Wales that rises in the Clocaenog Forest (grid reference SJ045535) 5 mi (8 km) northwest of Corwen. Its total length is 35 mi (56 km).

== Geography ==
It flows due south until, at Melin-y-wig, it veers north-eastwards due to the Vale of Clwyd Fault and passes through Derwen, Llanelidan, Pwllglas and Llanfair Dyffryn Clwyd to Ruthin. Here it leaves the relatively narrow valley and enters a broad agricultural vale, the Vale of Clwyd (Welsh: Dyffryn Clwyd). Just south of Denbigh, it is joined by the River Clywedog. This substantial tributary also has its source in the Clocaenog Forest but drains out to the east and north of the forest and passes through Cyffylliog, Bontuchel, and Rhewl before its confluence with the main river.

Then the Clwyd meanders northwards through the fertile Clwyd valley. Around 1.5 mi (2 km) north of St Asaph, the river is joined by a tributary as large as the main river, the River Elwy. In normal flows at low tide, the waters of these two rivers can be seen flowing side by side down the river with little mixing.

The River Elwy has its source a long way to the west on the flanks of Moel Seisiog south-east of Llanrwst. It also has a tributary, the River Aled, with its source in the upland lake Llyn Aled. The Elwy flows principally eastwards to join the Clwyd, passing through a few villages. At the confluence of the Elwy and the Clwyd, the river becomes tidal and enters a narrow estuary with much wildlife before meeting the Irish Sea at Rhyl.

In 1277, King Edward I sited a castle next to the Clwyd at Rhuddlan. In order for his supply barges to reach the castle, he employed 968 men to work on what was called 'The Great Ditch'. He straightened the 3 mi (4.8 km) stretch of river that ran from the castle to the sea. This was an enormous feat of engineering, compared even to today's modern standards, and it is still possible to make out the original loops and turns of the Clwyd using satellite imagery.

The former county of Clwyd, consisting of the modern-day principal areas of Denbighshire, Flintshire, Wrexham, and most of Conwy, was named after the river when it was created as a two-tier county in 1974.

Fish in the river include sea trout (sewin), as well as Atlantic salmon. In the 2017 season, there were reported catches of wild brown trout, most of which were returned unharmed on a voluntary catch-and-release system. Rhyl and St Asaph Angling Association controls 20 mi (32 km) of fishing on the River Clwyd and its tributaries, the River Elwy and River Aled.

== See also ==
- Rivers of the United Kingdom
- List of crossings of the River Clwyd
