= Graig quarry =

Quarry in Clwyd, Wales

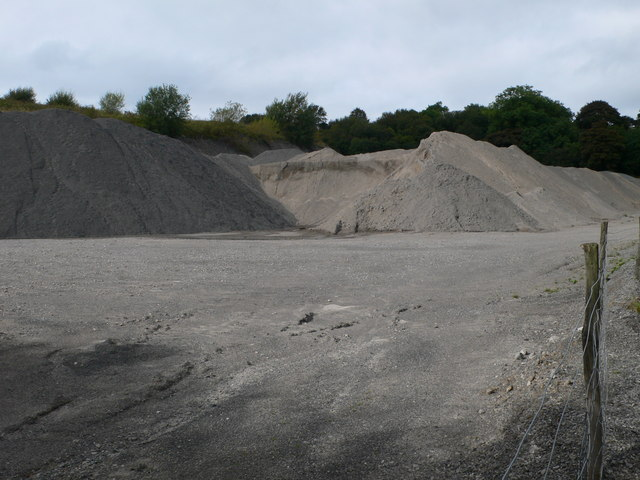
Graig Quarry, Graianrhyd

Graig Quarry is a limestone quarry that includes a Site of Special Scientific Interest. It is located near Mold in the former county of Clwyd, now Denbighshire, north Wales.

== See also ==
- List of Sites of Special Scientific Interest in Clwyd
