= River Clywedog, Denbighshire =

Tributary of the River Clwyd in Wales

Coordinates: 53.1278°N 3.3392°W

For the tributary of the River Dee near Wrexham see River Clywedog

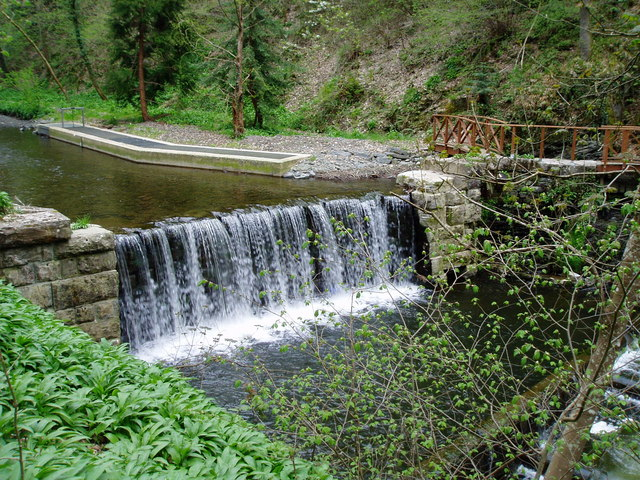
A weir on the river at Bontuchel

The River Clywedog (Welsh: Afon Clywedog) is a tributary of the River Clwyd in northeast Wales. The river rises within Clocaenog Forest and flows in a generally easterly direction through the villages of Cyffylliog, Bontuchel and Rhewl before turning northwards to join the Clwyd to the east of Denbigh.
