= Mynydd y Cwm =

Hill in Denbighshire, North Wales

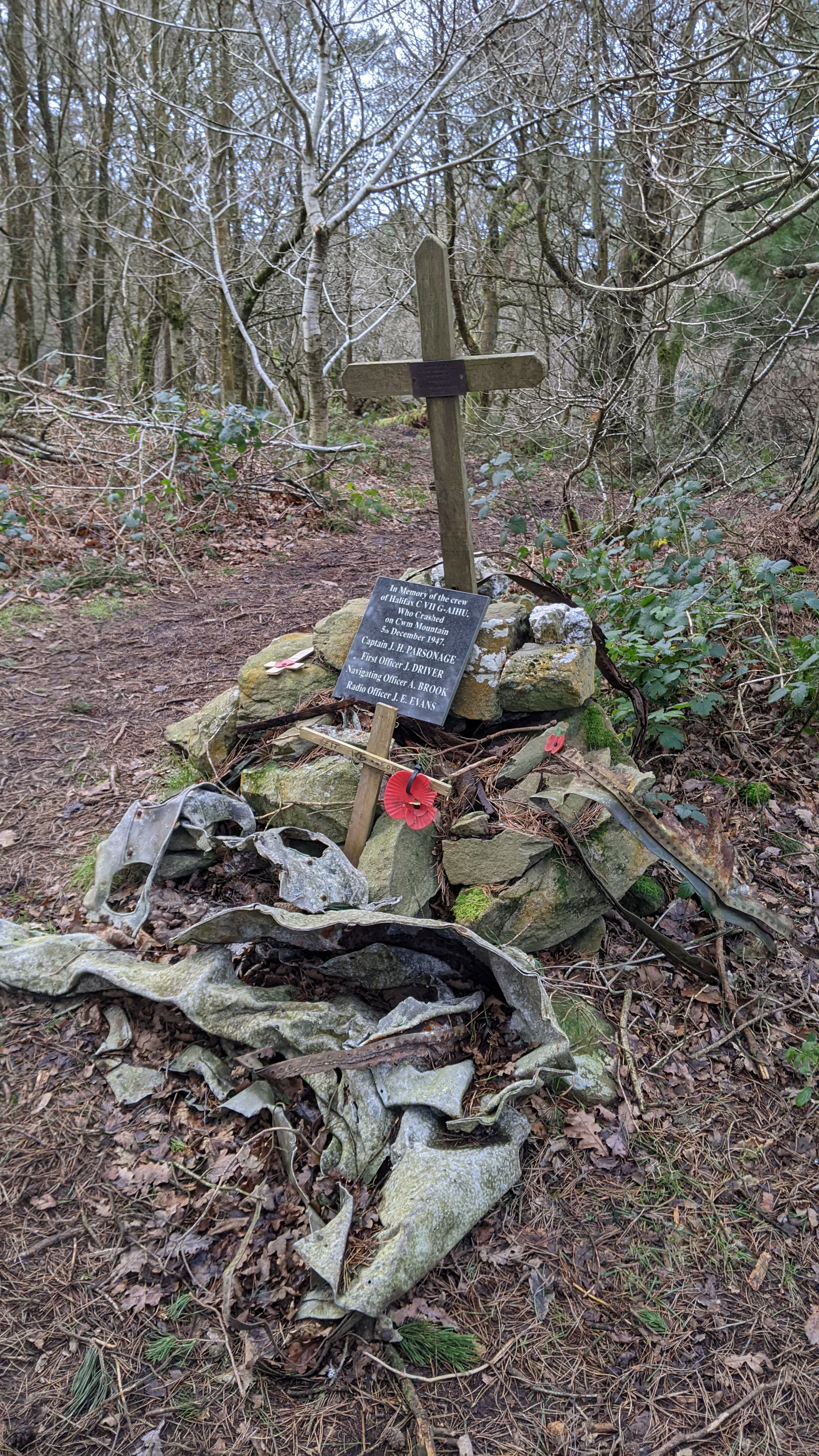
- Cairn and memorial at wooded summit

Highest point
- Elevation: 304.8 metres (1,000 ft)
- Prominence: 150 metres (492 ft)
- Listing: Marilyn
- Coordinates: 53.279584°N 3.392512°W

Geography
- Location: Denbighshire, Wales
- Parent range: Clwydian Range
- OS grid: SJ072767

Mynydd y Cwm is a hill in the Clwydian Range in Denbighshire, North Wales. It reaches a height of 304.8 metres (1,000 feet). It has recently been promoted to Marilyn status having a prominence of 150 metres.

At the summit there is a memorial to the crew of a Handley Page Halifax that crashed on the hill in 1947.
