= Vale of Clwyd =

Valley in Wales

Coordinates: 53.21°N 3.38°W

The Vale of Clwyd (Welsh: Dyffryn Clwyd) is a tract of low-lying ground in the county of Denbighshire in north-east Wales. The Vale extends south-southwestwards from the coast of the Irish Sea for some 20 miles (about 30 km) forming a triangle of low ground bounded on its eastern side by the well-defined scarp of the Clwydian Range and to the west by numerous low hills. The River Clwyd (Welsh: Afon Clwyd) which rises within Clocaenog Forest, southwest of Denbigh, runs the full length of the vale. It is joined by the two major left bank tributaries of the River Clywedog (Welsh: Afon Clywedog) and River Elwy (Welsh: Afon Elwy) and the smaller right bank tributary of the River Wheeler (Welsh: Afon Chwiler).

== History ==
Dyffryn Clwyd was a cantref of Medieval Wales, and from 1282 was a marcher lordship.

== Settlement and administration ==
At its seaward end are the coastal resorts of Kinmel Bay (Welsh: Bae Cinmel), Rhyl and Prestatyn whilst the city of Llanelwy (English: St Asaph) lies just inland. The other principal towns of the vale are Dinbych (English: Denbigh), and Rhuthun also Rhuddlan. Most of the area falls within the modern administrative county (and unitary authority) of Sîr Ddinbych Denbighshire and a portion is in Sîr Conwy Conwy County Borough; much of it lies within the Dyffryn Clwyd Vale of Clwyd UK Parliamentary constituency.

== Geology ==
The Vale of Clwyd is a sedimentary basin which takes the form of a half-graben whose eastern margin is marked by the Vale of Clwyd Fault. Like the Cheshire Basin further to its east, it is mostly floored by thick deposits of Permian and Triassic sandstone. Around St Asaph, late Carboniferous, Coal Measures mudstones and sandstones occur. The area was overrun by ice during the ice ages whose legacy is a covering of glacial till across the area and a swarm of drumlins along the western edge of the vale. Alluvium is encountered across the floodplains of the River Clwyd and its tributaries.
