= Moel Hiraddug =

Hillfort in Denbighshire, Wales

Coordinates: 53.2925°N 3.4064°W

Moel Hiraddug, also known as Y Foel, is a hill fort and hill in the Clwydian Range of north-east Wales. The northern part of the hill has been eaten away by limestone quarrying. An Iron Age hillfort crowns the hill, called Moel Hiraddug. Its ridge runs North-South and it lies above the village of Dyserth. The views from the top are extensive and include Snowdonia. It is 265 metres (869 feet) above sea level.

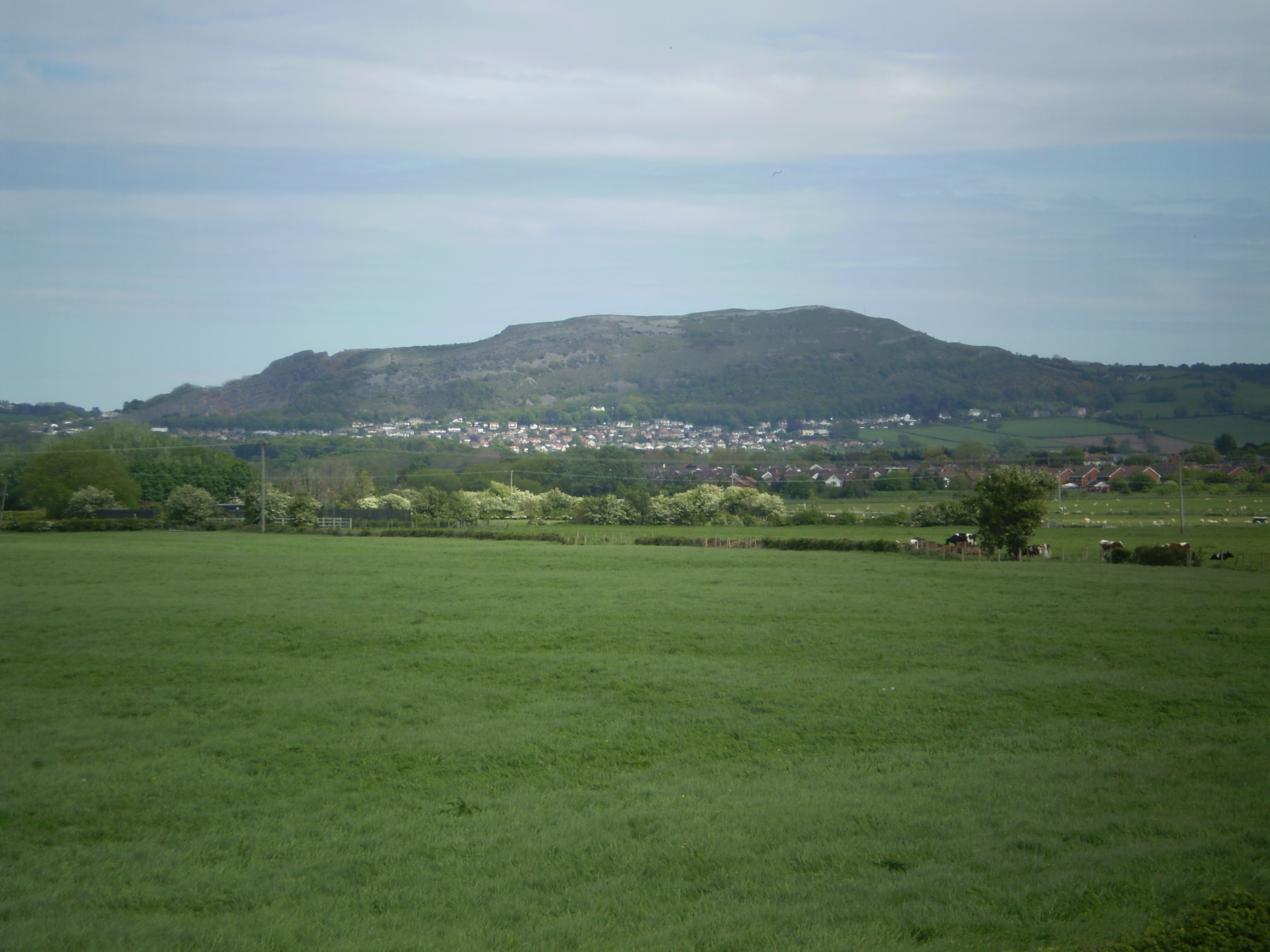
Moel Hiraddug from River Clwyd

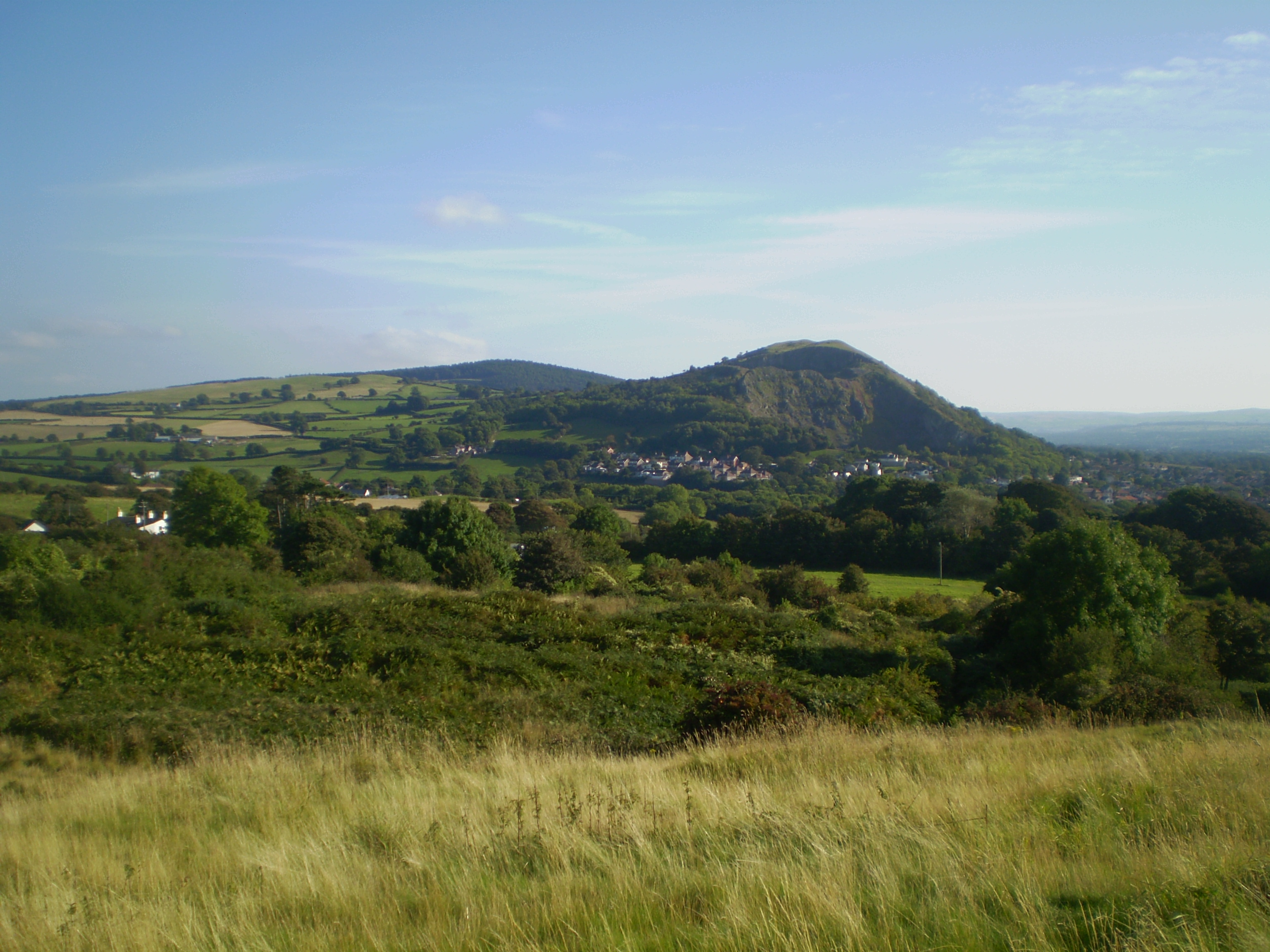
Moel Hiraddug from Graig Fawr above Meliden
