= Clwydian Range =

Hill range in north Wales

- Clwydian Hills
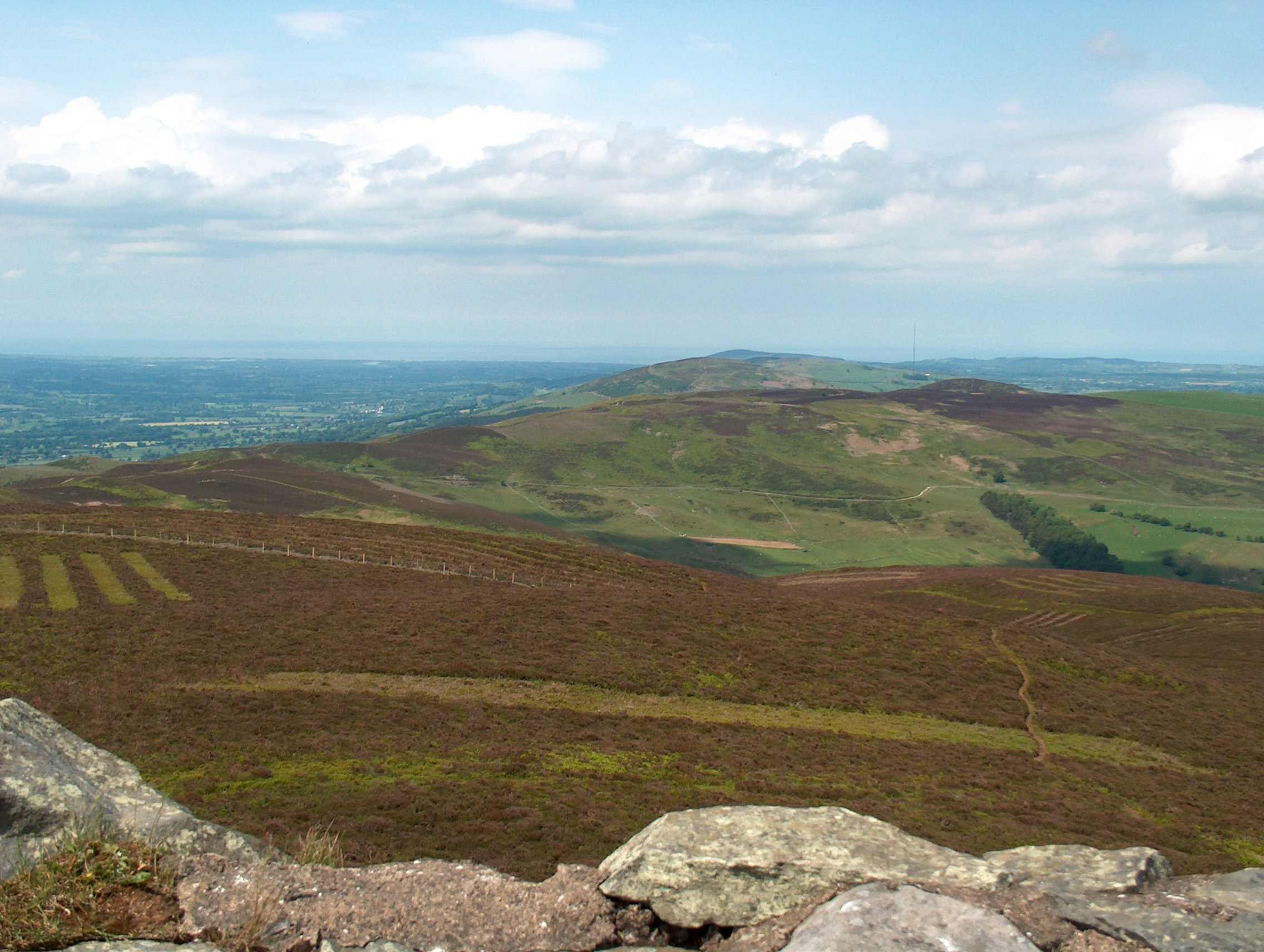
- Northern section of the Clwydian Range towards Liverpool Bay

Highest point
- Peak: Moel Famau
- Elevation: 554 m (1,818 ft)
- Coordinates: 53.1544°N 3.25602°W

Dimensions
- Length: 20 mi (32 km)
- Width: 4 mi (6.4 km)

Naming
- Nickname: Clwyds
- Native name: Bryniau Clwyd (Welsh)

Geography
- Location: Wales (Great Britain)
- Region: North Wales

Geology
- Formed by: upstanding block of deep sea sediments
- Rock age: ~ 443.8 million years ago
- Rock type: debris slurries laid down during the Silurian period

The Clwydian Range (Welsh: Bryniau Clwyd; also Clwydian Hills or Clwyds) is a series of hills in the north-east of Wales that runs from Llandegla in the south to Prestatyn in the north; the highest point is 554 m (1,818 ft) Moel Famau. The range forms the north-western part of the Clwydian Range and Dee Valley Area of Outstanding Natural Beauty.

== Geology ==
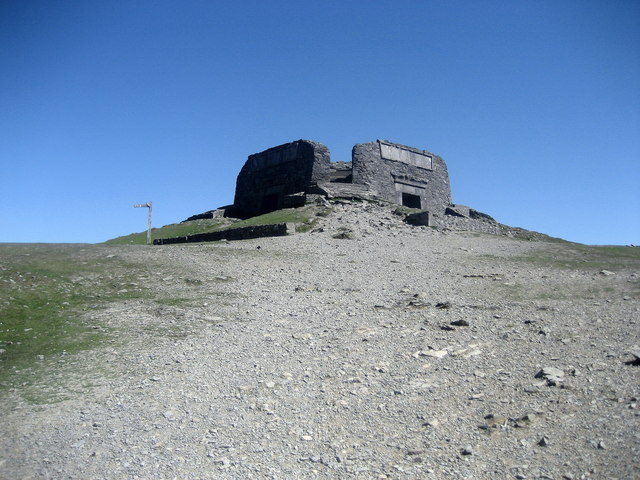
The summit of Moel Famau is strewn with Turbidite

The Clwydian Hills are formed from an upstanding block of deep sea sediments formed during the Silurian period as debris slurries originating on the nearby continental shelf. The older mudstones and siltstones of the Nantglyn Flags Formation form parts of the west-facing scarp slope and the overlying Elwy Formation, which consists of mudstones and siltstones deposited in deep marine conditions with numerous sandstone beds, forms most of the higher ground. Both formations are of Ludlovian age. The range's rocks are intensely faulted; the major Vale of Clwyd Fault is responsible for the impressive west-facing scarp of the Clwydian Range. It downthrows the rocks to the west and separates the younger Carboniferous and Permo-Triassic rocks of the Vale of Clwyd from those of the hills.

Ice from the Welsh ice-sheet moved eastwards over the Clwydian Hills during the last ice age, impinging on the Irish Sea Ice to the east of the range. Numerous glacial meltwater channels occur around the range whilst the valley of the River Wheeler which cuts the range in two was a significant drainage channel.

== Geography ==
The hills in the Clwydian Range provide extensive views across northern Wales, to the high peaks of Snowdonia, eastwards across the Cheshire Plain to the Peak District, and towards Manchester and Liverpool in England to the northeast. The Offa's Dyke National Trail traverses the range's high ground from Llandegla to Prestatyn.

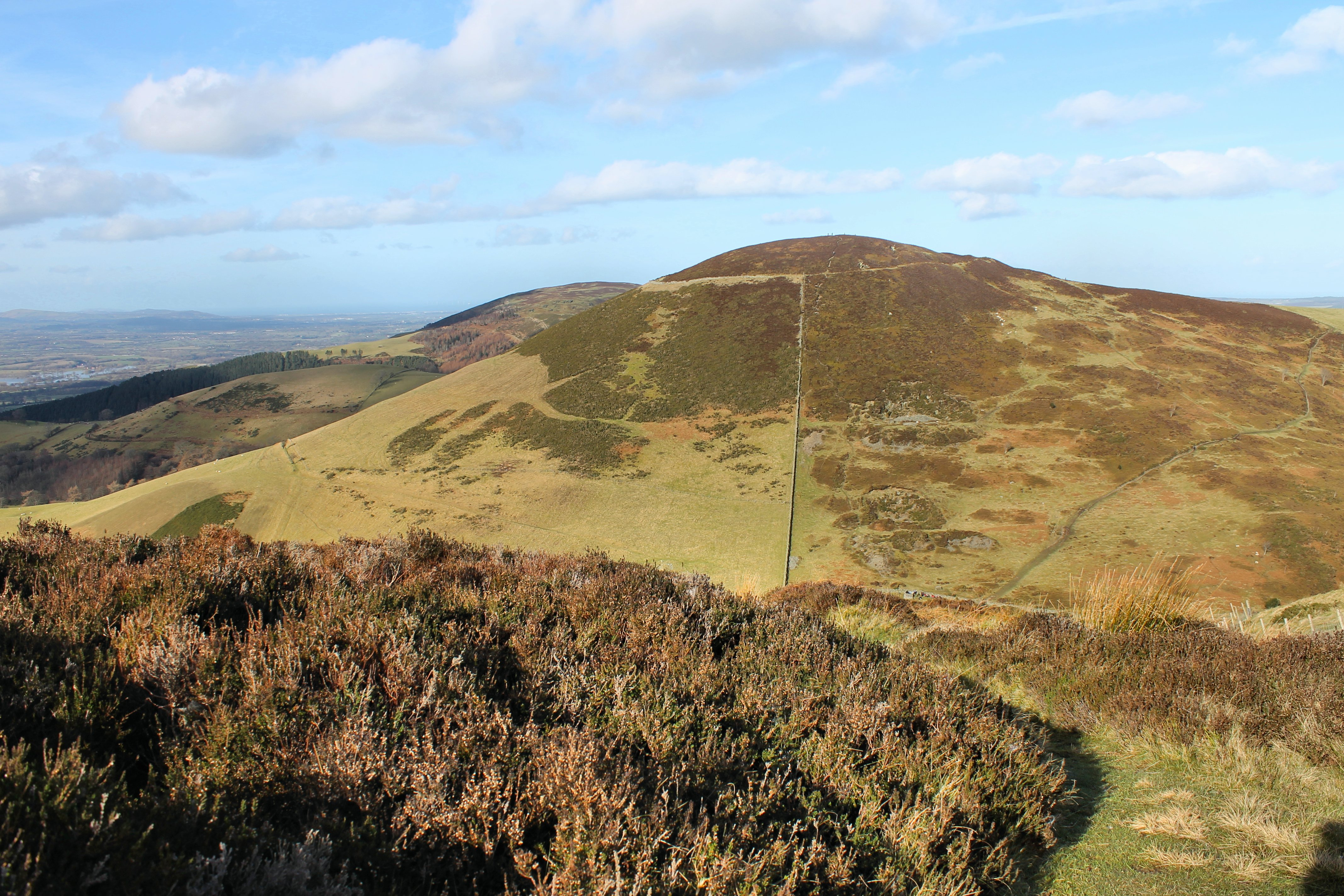
Moel Arthur from Moel Llys-y-Coed

The hills, which are mainly heather-clad upland above pastures, have six Iron Age hillforts including Y Foel (Moel Hiraddug), Moel-y-gaer, Penycloddiau, Moel Arthur, a second Moel y Gaer and Foel Fenlli. There are several tumuli and cairns on the hills.

=== Summits ===
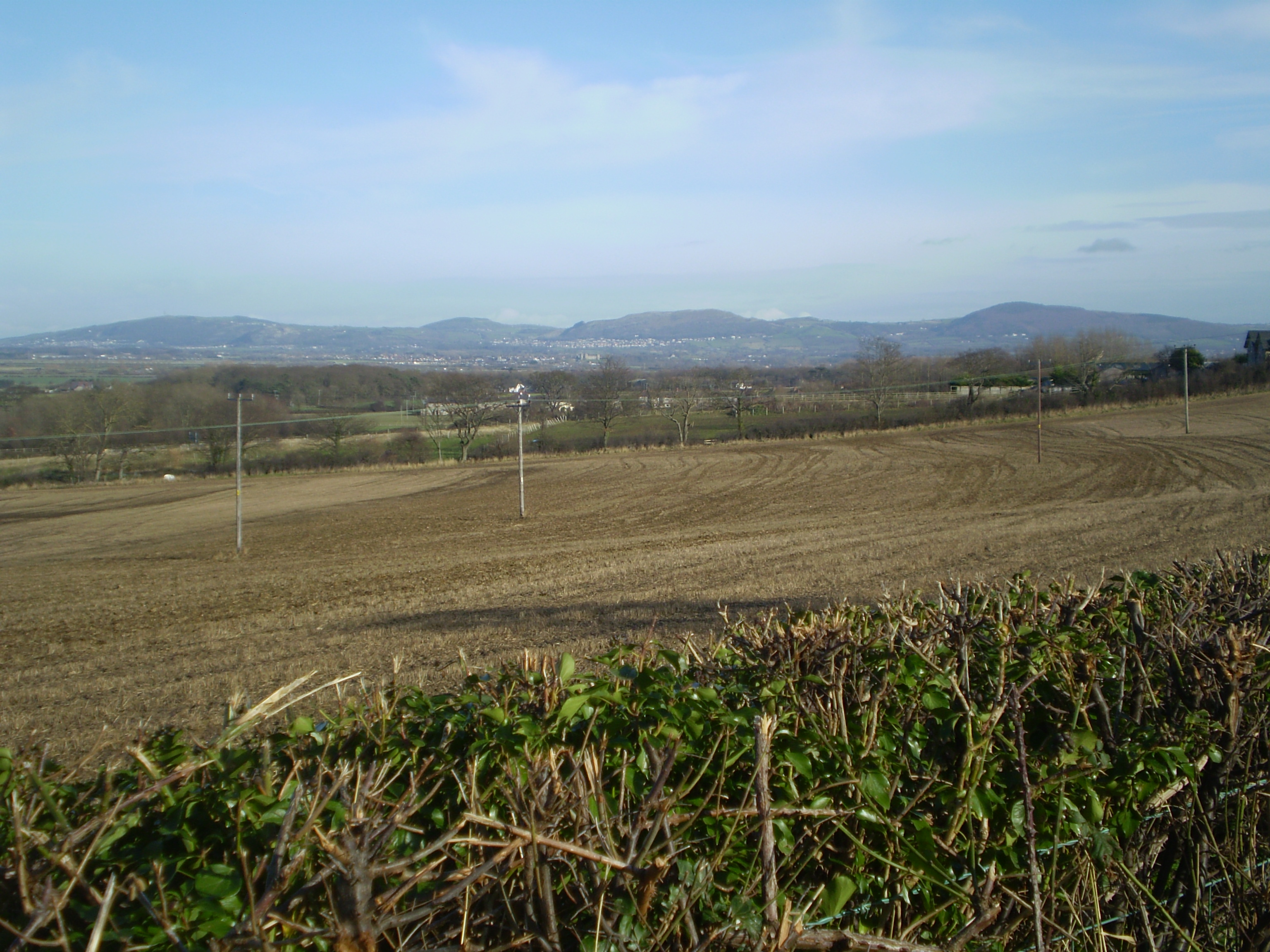
Clwydian Range from Abergele showing from left to right: Prestatyn Hillside, Gop Hill, Moel Hiraddug and Mynydd y Cwm

| # | Peak | Elevation (m) | Grid reference |
|---|---|---|---|
| 1 | Bryn Coed yr Esgob | 211 | SJ068812 |
| 2 | Moel Hiraddug | 265 | SJ063785 |
| 3 | Mynydd y Cwm | 300 | SJ073768 |
| 4 | Moel Maenefa | 290 | SJ085745 |
| 5 | Moel y Gaer | 206 | SJ095708 |
| 6 | Moel y Parc | 398 | SJ114703 |
| 7 | Penycloddiau | 440 | SJ127678 |
| 8 | Moel Plas-yw | 420 | SJ152669 |
| 9 | Moel Arthur | 456 | SJ145661 |
| 10 | Moel Llys-y-coed | 465 | SJ145655 |
| 11 | Moel Dywyll | 475 | SJ151632 |
| 12 | Moel Famau | 554 | SJ161626 |
| 13 | Moel y Gaer | 339 | SJ148617 |
| 14 | Moel Fenlli | 511 | SJ162600 |
| 15 | Moel Eithinen | 434 | SJ168592 |
| 16 | Gyrn | 384 | SJ165586 |
| 17 | Moel Gyw | 467 | SJ171575 |
| 18 | Moel Llanfair | 447 | SJ169566 |
| 19 | Moel y Plâs | 440 | SJ170554 |
| 20 | Moel y Gelli | 361 | SJ166545 |
| 21 | Moel y Waun | 412 | SJ168534 |
| 22 | Moel yr Acre | 400 | SJ169525 |

== Area of Outstanding Natural Beauty ==
The Clwydian Range was designated as an Area of Outstanding Natural Beauty in 1985, one of only five in Wales. The original area was 167 square kilometres (64 sq mi), but in 2011 the area was extended southwards by a further 229 square kilometres (88 sq mi) to include the Dee Valley, Moel y Gamelin, the Horseshoe Pass and Castell Dinas Bran, the towns of Llangollen and Corwen, the Pontcysyllte Aqueduct, Chirk Castle and Valle Crucis Abbey. The AONB now extends to 389 square kilometres (150 sq mi).

A wide range of wildlife thrives in the range, including red kites and red foxes, which both prey on rabbits and voles. There is also one of the few Welsh populations of black grouse and there is a project to conserve the European water vole, which is suffering a large decline in numbers across the United Kingdom. Another project is trying to get rid of the non-native Himalayan balsam which has invaded the Alyn Valley area.

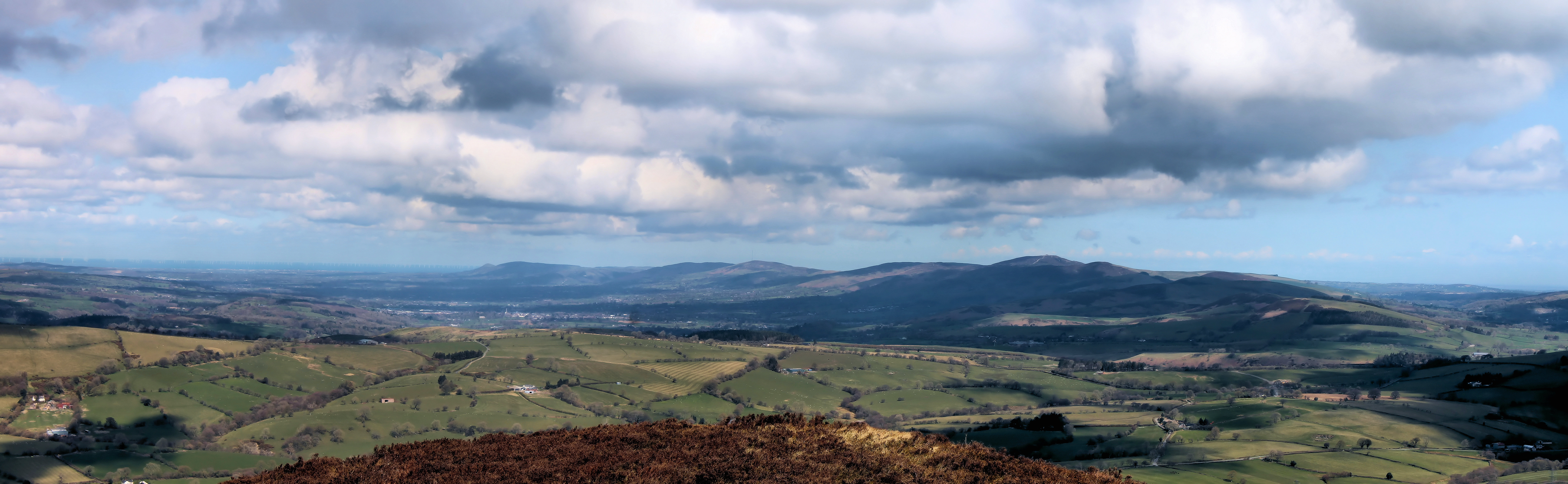
The Clwydian Range from Moel Morfydd

== Recreation ==
The Offa's Dyke Path follows the Clwydian Range, although Offa's Dyke itself was not constructed on it. The Clwydian Way long distance footpath passes through the Clwydian Range, and the North Wales Path follows the foot of the scarp between Prestatyn and Dyserth.
