= River Aled =

Small river in Conwy County Borough, Wales

Coordinates: 53°14′N 3°35′W

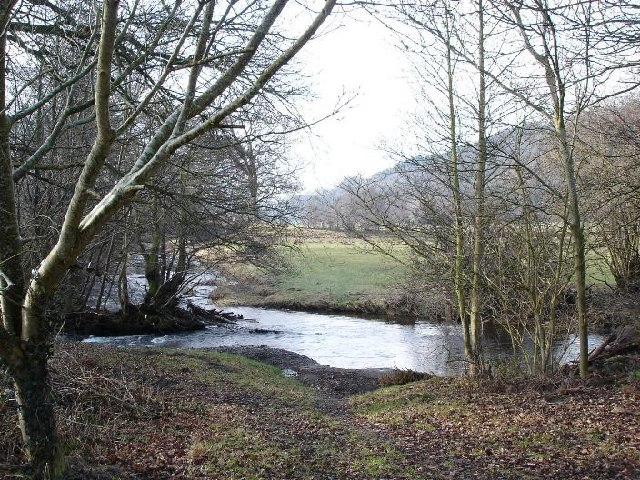
The River Aled near Rhyd-yr-arian.

The River Aled, a small river near Conwy County Borough, flows into River Elwy.

The river originates at Llyn Aled on Mynydd Hiraethog to the right of the village Llansannan. It flows through Llyn Aled Isaf and then towards the north through Llansannan and Bryn Rhyd-yr-arian before meeting River Elwy to the east of village Llanfair Talhaearn.

The River Aled is controlled, and thus so is the River Elwy, by reservoirs and Llyn Aled.

In the Middle Ages the river marked the boundary between Commotes and Upper and Lower Aled.

Fishing on a long section of the River Aled, both banks, is controlled by the Rhyl and St Angling Association, near to Bryn Rhyd-yr-Arian.

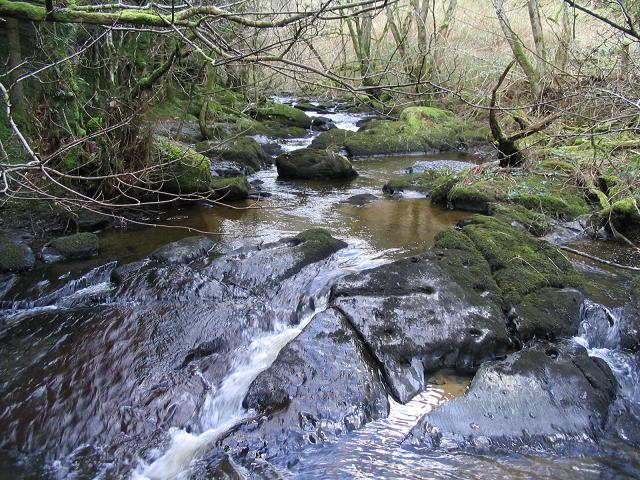
River Aled taken from Pidgeon Bridge
