= Llyn Aled =

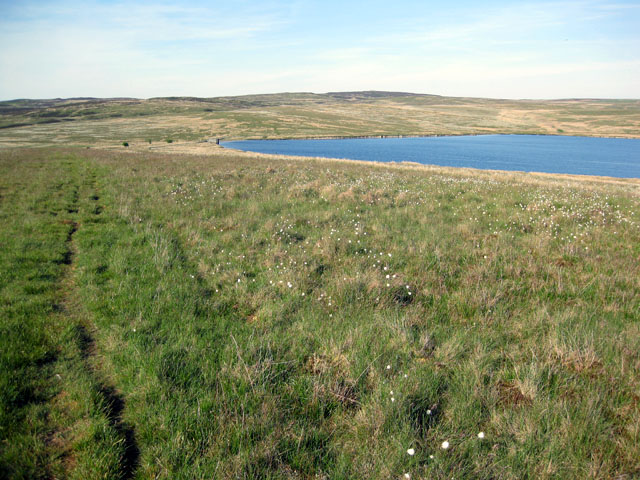
- Moorland above Llyn Aled

- Location within Wales
- Location: Conwy County Borough, Wales
- Coordinates: 53°06′18″N 3°37′15″W
- Type: lake
- Surface area: 112.7 ares (1.127 ha)
- Surface elevation: 1,227 feet (374 m)

Llyn Aled is a lake on Mynydd Hiraethog in the Conwy County Borough. It is situated north of the A543 and 7 kilometres (4.3 mi) to the north-east of the village of Pentrefoelas. It is a natural lake; however, a dam was built at its northern outlet to increase its size. It has an area of 112.7 ares (1.127 ha) and is 1,227 feet (374 m) above sea level. One can reach the lake via the A543. There are a number of varieties of fish in the lake, including pike. The lake was used by the Llyn Aled Sailing Club (Clwb Hwylio Llyn Aled), but the club closed down due to a dwindling membership and the proximity of the much larger Llyn Brenig.

The Clwydian Way runs along the north side of the lake.

Llyn Aled feeds the Llyn Aled Isaf reservoir. The lake is also the source of the River Aled, which flows northward.
