= Moel Arthur =

Iron age hillfort in Flintshire, Wales

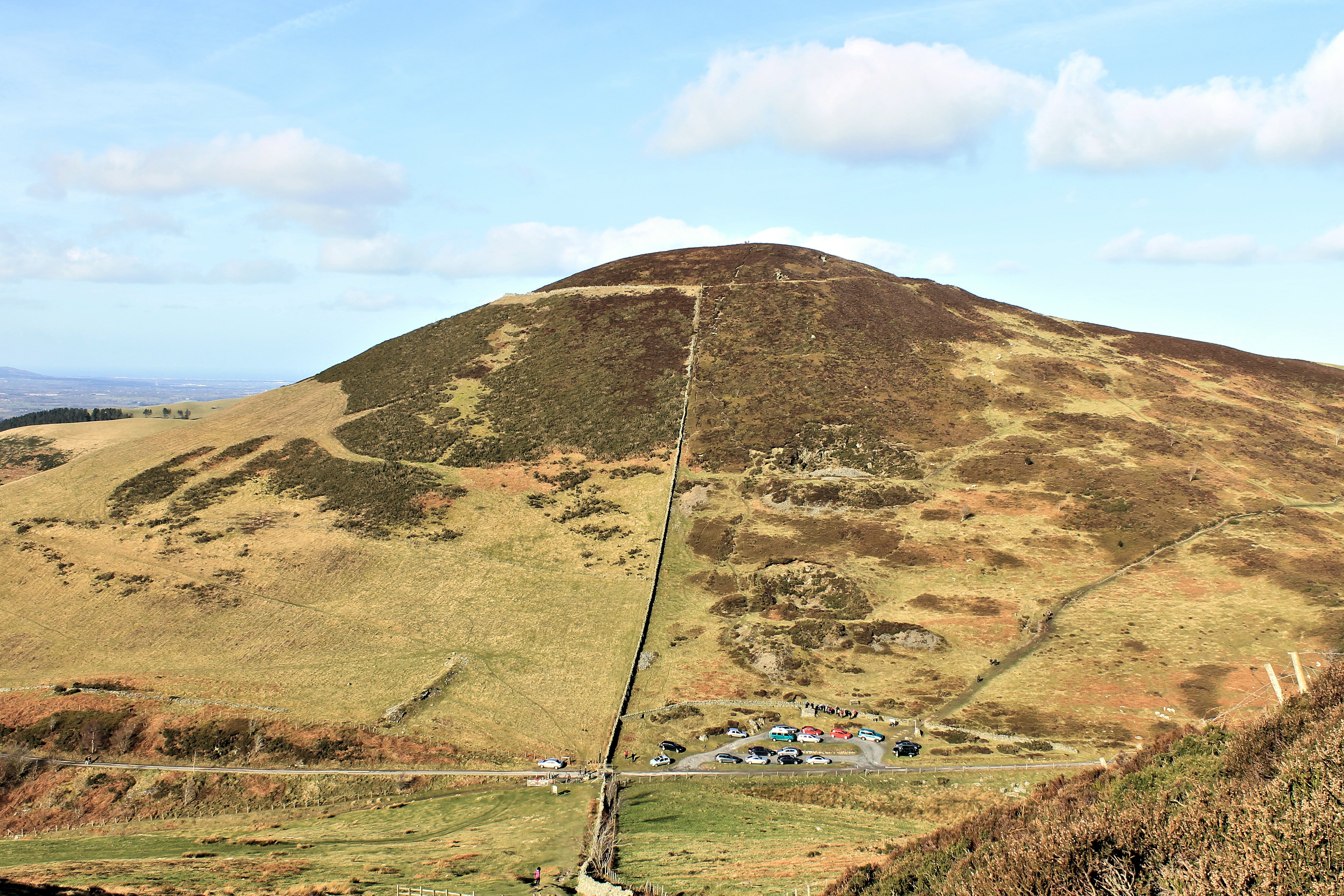
- Viewed from the south-east

- Location within Flintshire
- 53°11′4″N 3°16′50″W
- Type: Hillfort
- Periods: Iron Age
- Location: Near Denbigh, Wales
- OS grid reference: SJ 14529 66034

Site notes
- Height: 455.8 metres (1,495 ft)
- Length: 160 metres (520 ft)
- Width: 140 metres (460 ft)
- Area: 1.8 hectares (4.4 acres)

Moel Arthur ('Arthur's Hill') is an Iron Age hillfort in Flintshire, Wales, at the boundary with Denbighshire, about 5 miles (8.0 km) east of Denbigh.

It is on a prominent hill, height 455.8 metres (1,495 ft), in the Clwydian Range; it overlooks the Vale of Clwyd to the west. Offa's Dyke Path skirts the hill. It is about 1 mile (1.6 km) south-east of the hillfort of Penycloddiau.

== Description ==
The oval fort is about 160 metres (520 ft) north–south and 140 metres (460 ft) east–west, enclosing an area of 1.8 hectares (4.4 acres). There are two large banks and ditches to the north, where the hill slope is not steep; above the steep south-west, south and east slopes there is a single bank. At the north-east, at the edge of the steeper slopes, there is a narrow inturned entrance with an oblique approach. The form of entrance, and the simple plan of the fort, suggest that it is an early example.

Within the fortifications, there is a rounded summit. In the north and east of the interior there is a broad terrace, and building platforms have been found.

There was excavation in 1849 by Wynne Ffoulkes. He found "coarse red Roman pottery" which has not been preserved; it is not known if it was Roman, which would suggest occupation into the Roman period, or prehistoric. He found traces of a drystone construction, destroyed during the excavation, near the south of the entrance. In 1962, three copper Bronze Age axes were found within the defences.

== See also ==
- Hillforts in Britain
- List of Scheduled Monuments in Flintshire
