= Moel Famau =

Hill in the Clwydian Range, Wales

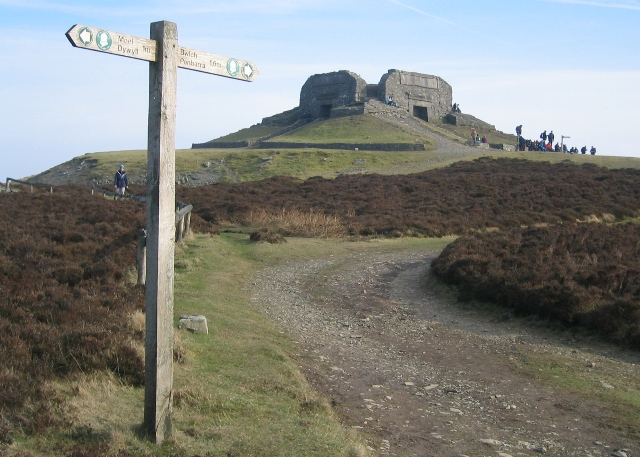
- The Jubilee Tower at the summit of Moel Famau

Highest point
- Elevation: 1,821 ft (555 m)
- Prominence: 912 ft (278 m)
- Parent peak: Moel y Gamelin
- Listing: Marilyn, Council top
- Coordinates: 53°09′16″N 3°15′21″W

Naming
- English translation: The bare hill of ?Mama
- Language of name: Welsh
- Pronunciation: Welsh: [ˈmɔɨ̯l ˈvama]

Geography
- Location within Wales
- Location: Clwydian Range, UK
- OS grid: SJ162627
- Topo map: OS Landranger 116

Moel Famau is the highest hill in the Clwydian Range and the highest point (county top) of the county of Flintshire in Wales (both the historic county and the current council area). It lies on the boundary between Denbighshire and Flintshire. The hill, which also gives its name to the Moel Famau country park, has been classed as an Area of Outstanding Natural Beauty since 1985. It is also surrounded by several well-preserved Iron Age hill forts. It is also the fourth-highest peak in the extended AONB of the Clwydian Range and Dee Valley. It is sometimes claimed as the highest point in North-east Wales, but that honour goes to Cadair Berwyn; Moel Famau is also lower than Moel y Gamelin and Moel Fferna, the highest points in the Clwydian Range and Dee Valley Area of Outstanding Natural Beauty.

A northern part of the Offa's Dyke long-distance footpath, one of the UK's most popular National Trails, crosses the summit of Moel Famau and the Jubilee Tower. Loggerheads Country Park is nearby.

== Name ==
Although historical sources attest to a variety of spellings (such as Moel Famma, Moel Vamma and Moel Fammau), the only two in common use today are Moel Famau and Moel Fama. The first word moel is a common Welsh place-name element meaning "bare". The meaning and preferred spelling of the second element are less certain, but is roughly translated into "mothers".

Attestations from as early as the fourteenth century consistently show that the second element ends in –a. This conforms to the local pronunciation (Welsh: [ˈvama]) and is "the preferred spelling", according to the Dictionary of the Place-names of Wales. The meaning of the Fama is somewhat uncertain, but it is probably a lenited form of a personal name, 'Mama'.

The alternative form Moel Famau is a result of an "antiquarian perception" first attested in the eighteenth century that the second element was the lenited form of the common noun mamau ("mothers"). If that were the case, however, the early forms in –a would be very difficult to explain. Nevertheless, the form Moel Famau is common today and it is still sometimes said to mean "mothers' hill".

== Country Park ==
The park, which covers an area over 3 square miles (8 km^{2}), is managed by Denbighshire Countryside Service which is responsible for the heather moorland, dry stone walls and access paths, and provides information and facilities for visitors. The area is home to wildlife such as red grouse, European stonechat and Eurasian curlew. The summit of Moel Famau lies just within the Flintshire border.

Natural Resources Wales manage the neighbouring forest as a sustainable conifer plantation for timber production and tourism.

== Walking ==
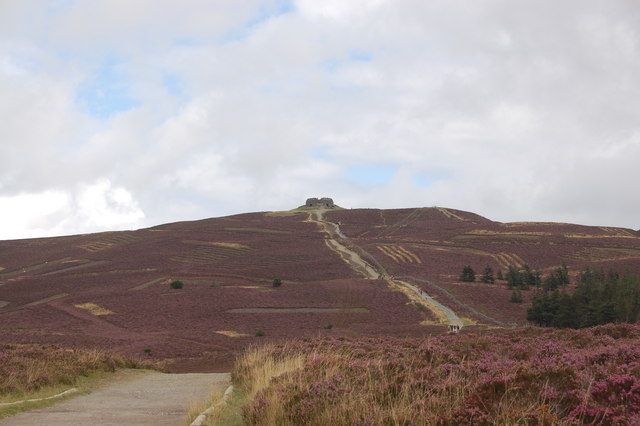
Path from Bwlch Penbarras towards the summit of Moel Famau

Numerous well-maintained paths of varying difficulty lead to the summit. Two of the easiest and most popular routes start from the southern car parks at Bwlch Penbarras, a pass between Moel Famau and Foel Fenlli, about 1.25 miles (2.0 km) from the summit. The northern route begins at the car park south of the Iron Age hill fort at Moel Arthur. A footpath to the top of Moel Famau also begins from the village of Cilcain.

Much of North East Wales and North West England can sometimes be seen from the summit of Moel Famau. This includes parts of Denbighshire, Flintshire, Cheshire and Merseyside. On clear days, Snowdonia can be seen to the west, the Irish Sea to the north, and to the east Liverpool, Chester, Winter Hill, and Blackpool Tower.

== Jubilee Tower ==
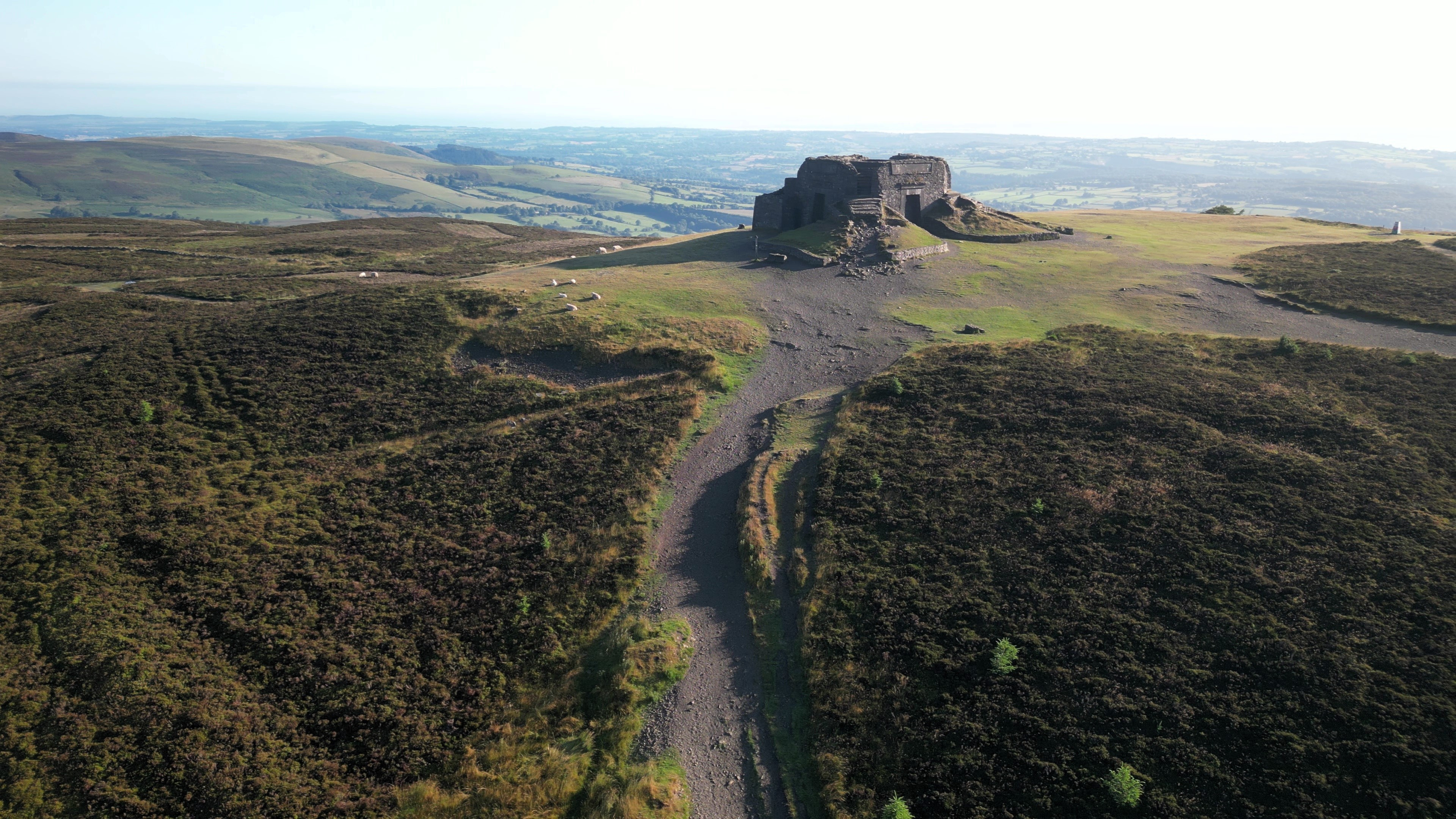
Moel Famau viewed from aloft by drone

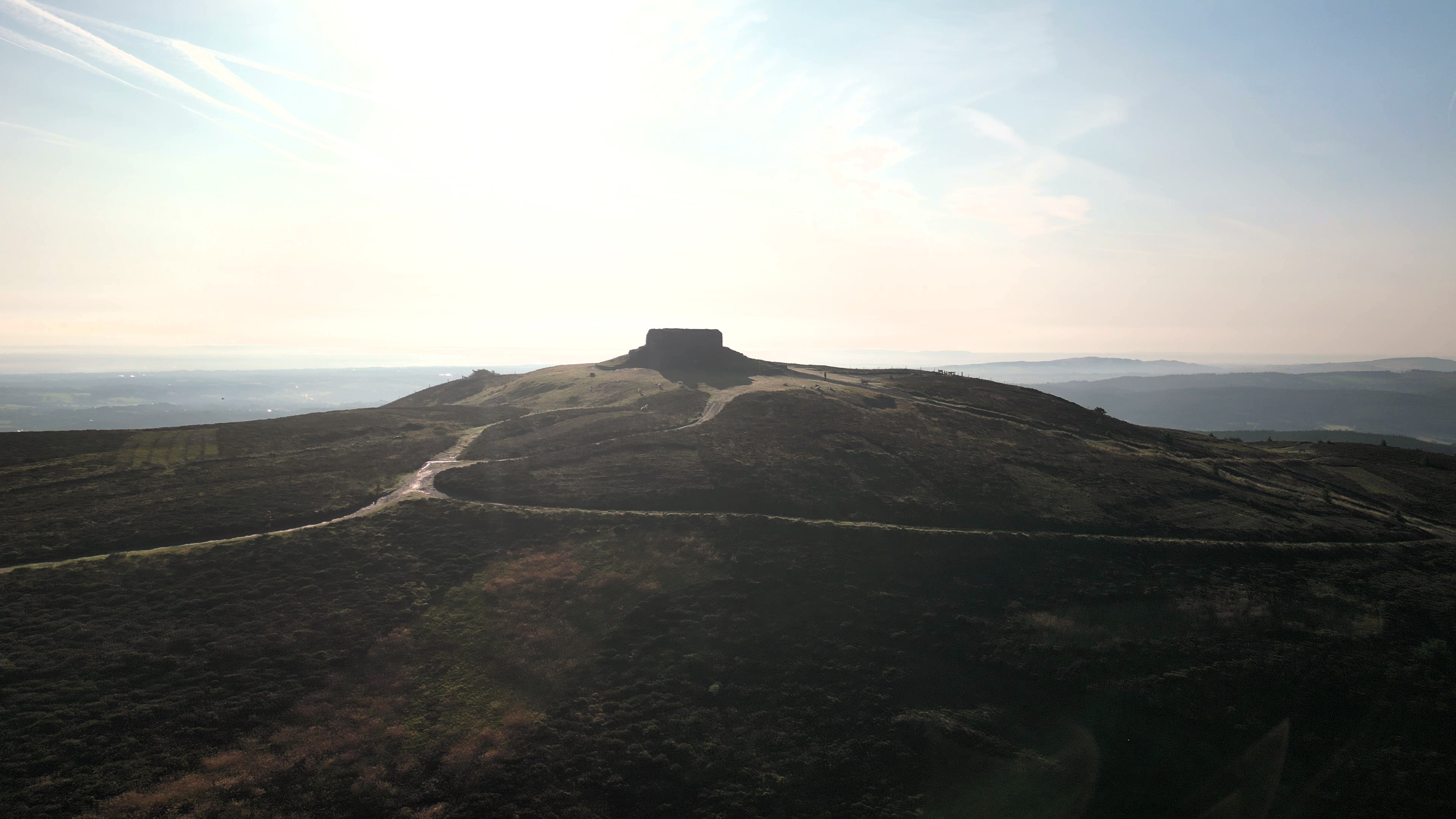
Moel Famau viewed from aloft by drone (2)

The tower, which was built to commemorate the Golden Jubilee of George III in 1810, was designed by Thomas Harrison of Chester and is a Grade II listed building. It was designed like an Egyptian obelisk with three tiers. Although the foundation stone was laid in 1810 by George Kenyon, 2nd Baron Kenyon, lack of funds meant that the tower was never completed. On three sides it was to have had the following inscription:

Georgia III Brittaniarum Regi, Pio Justo Patri Patrio Commitatus, Denbigh et Flint, Jubilantus Posuere, 25 Octobris, Anno Domino 1809.

In 1862, a major storm brought down the incomplete tower. The remaining upper part of the structure was demolished for safety reasons leaving just the base. Most of the rubble was removed from the site; smaller stonework was reused by local farmers for dry stone walls.

In October 2010, a celebration was observed by local communities, in both Flintshire and Denbighshire, to mark the 200th anniversary of the laying of the Jubilee Tower's foundation stone. An artistic light and laser installation by a local artist was commissioned by the local authorities to illuminate the tower.
