= Foel Fenlli =

Hill in Denbighshire, Wales

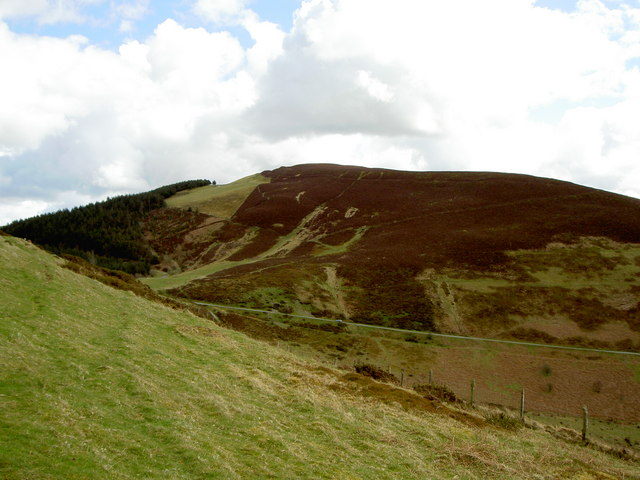

Highest point
- Elevation: 511 m (1,677 ft)
- Prominence: 153 m (502 ft)
- Parent peak: Moel Famau
- Listing: Marilyn
- Coordinates: 53.1313°N 3.2497°W

Geography
- Location: Denbighshire, Wales
- Parent range: Clwydian Range
- OS grid: SJ164600
- Topo map: OS Landranger 116

Foel Fenlli or Moel Fenlli is a hill in Denbighshire, North Wales. With a summit at an elevation of 511 metres (1,677 ft), it is the second highest peak of the Clwydian Range.

A popular ascent leads south from the car park at Bwlch Penbarras, which is also a popular starting point for ascending Moel Famau to the north. The Offa's Dyke Path runs around the western slopes. The remains of a hillfort roughly 25 acres in area are found on the peak.

== The Hillfort ==
Although the exact date of the hillfort's construction is unknown, it is presumed to predate the Roman conquest of Wales and the site "was fortified with no mean engineering skill and knowledge." Surface finds and partial excavations carried out since the early 1800s have uncovered pottery of Roman origin and many coins which suggest the site was occupied "by a large native population, say, from A.D. 100 to 400." The principal find of coins occurred in 1816 and consisted of almost 1500 Roman coins, mostly mid-fourth century Constantinian bronzes. A gold coin of Nero's time was found nearby at Llanrhydd in 1823.

According to later legend recorded in the Historia Brittonum the "iniquitous and tyrannical" king Benlli (after whom the mountain was named) probably lived there c. 450. He was admonished for opposing Saint Germanus, and he and his castle were "consumed by fire from heaven", so the legend goes. There are the remains of strong ramparts on all sides, with an entrance at the west end. In the south-west quarter of the fort enclosure are about two dozen hut platforms; there is a spring close to the centre.

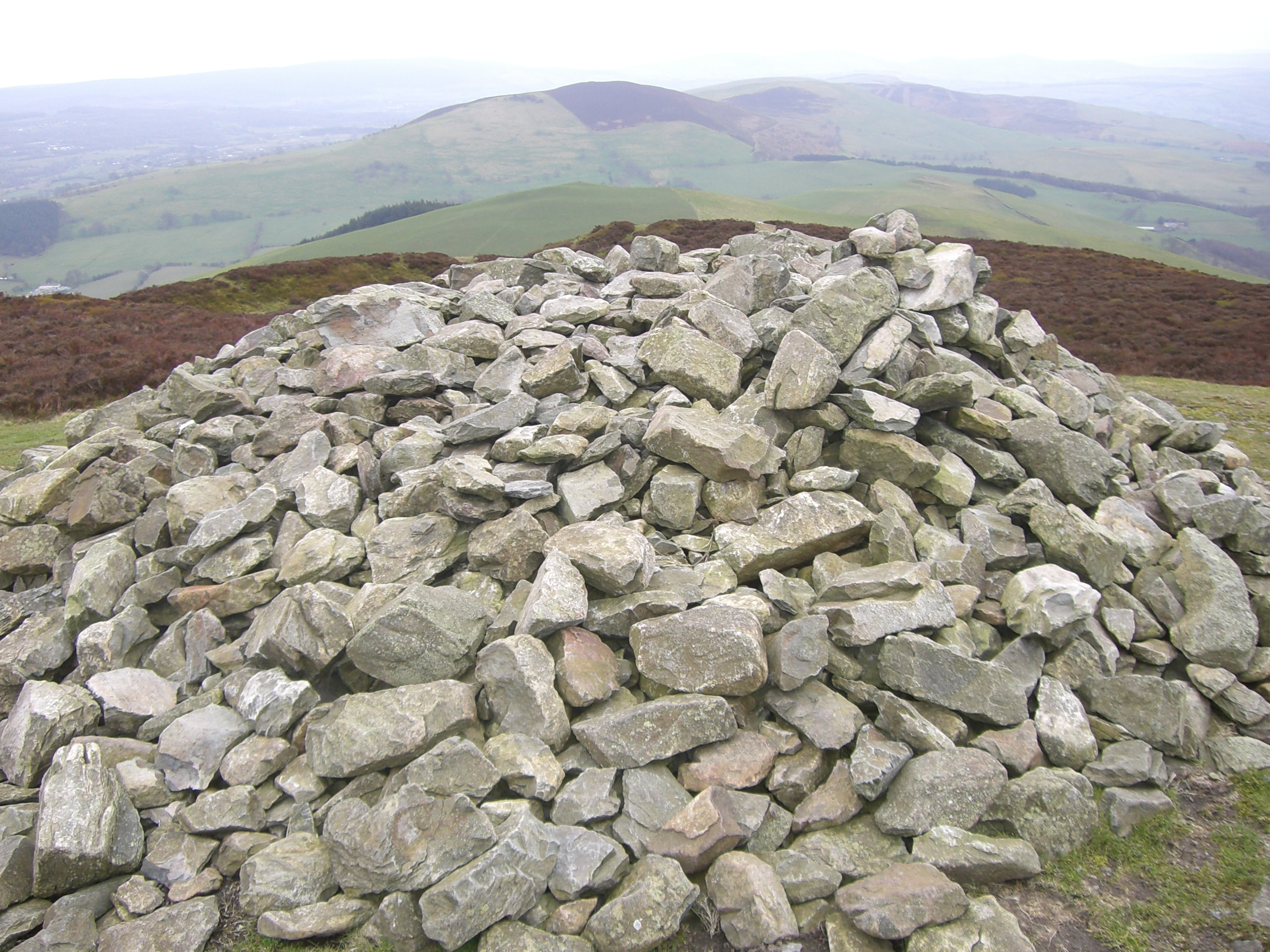
Cairn at the summit

== See also ==
- List of hillforts in Wales
