= St Colanus' Church, Colan =

Colan Church
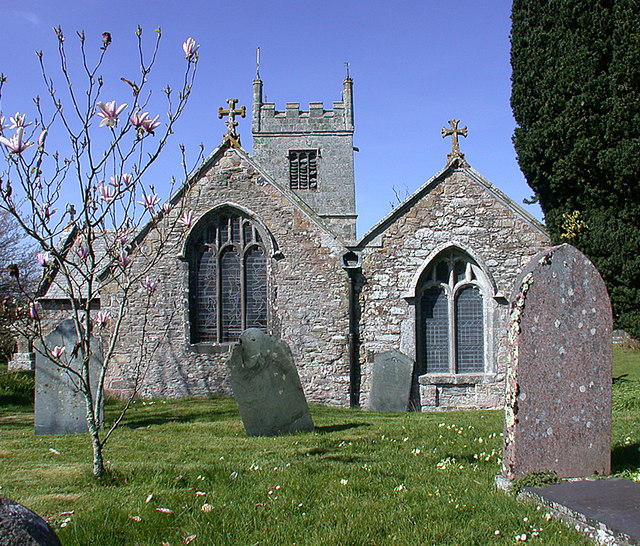
- Saint Colan Church

- Location of Colan Church in Cornwall
- 50°24′46.2″N 5°00′6.5″W
- Denomination: Anglican
- Website: http://www.colan-church.org

History
- Dedication: St Colan

Architecture
- Style: Medieval
- Years built: 13th Century Extended between the 14th & 15th Century Church Tower rebuilt in 1879

Listed Building – Grade I
- Official name: Church of St Colanus
- Designated: 10 February 1967
- Reference no.: 1144182

Colan Church also known as St Colan Church is a 13th-century church in Colan, mid-Cornwall, UK. Dedicated to St Colanus, it became a Grade I listed building in 1967. The vicars of St Columb Minor have served the church since the middle of the 20th century.

== Geography ==
The church is located between St Columb Major and Newquay, though not on the main road. It sits on the banks of Ryalton Stream, set in remote surroundings, in an area rich in wildlife. St Colan parish is in the rural deanery of Pydar.

== History ==
Walter Bronscombe, Bishop of Exeter, is credited with the building the present church in 1250. He later applied to it the instructions he had developed for Exeter Cathedral and for the sacristan of Glasney College in 1276. The present church was dedicated to St Collen, or St Colanus, a 7th-century Welsh saint, by John Grandisson, Bishop of Exeter, July 14, 1336. According to another inference, the first church on the site was built by St Collen. There are two other churches dedicated to him, St Collen’s at Llangollen in North Wales, and another at Langolen near Quimper in Brittany, France. St Collen was said to be the abbot of the church but left it to preach more widely elsewhere.

In 1876, the church was in a dilapidated state. The ribs of the roof sloped towards the tower, which was held together by iron bands. The interior was filled by high pews. The walls were damp-stained. After the reconstitution of the diocese of Exeter in 1876, the church was transferred to the Diocese of Truro with the patronage of the Bishop of Exeter. The main tower was rebuilt in 1879. By 1887, the church had been completely restored thanks to the efforts of the vicar and Paget Hoblyn of Fir Hill Manor. In 1967, the Building and Churches Board incorporated the church as a Grade I Listed Building.

Vicars

Some of the vicars were: Peter Watts, 1536; Randell, 1662; Budge, 1664; Wood, 1677; Vyvyan, 1712; Newcombe, 1714; J Bagwell, 1715; J Bagwell, 1717; John Colier, 1754; S Gurney, 1762; J Gurney, 1768; John Arthur, 1790; John Creser, 1837.

== Architecture ==
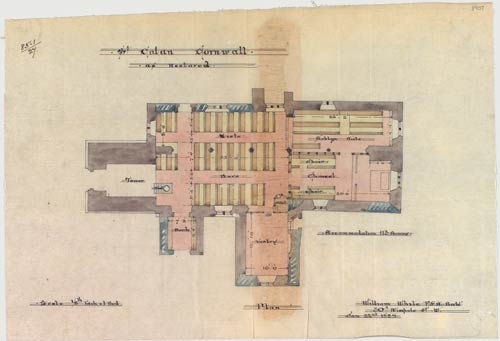
Floorplan from 1885

Colan Church is a parish church. Initially it was built to a cruciform plan and expanded during the 15th century. Slatestone and granite rubble with granite dressings formed the basic building materials for its construction. The top part of the tower is built in granite ashlar masonry while the lower part is banded with a darker variety of stones. The west tower is on two levels, built over a hollow-chamfered plinth. The slate roof has ridge tiles at the crest and gable ends, with raised coped verges and cross finials. It is wagon-shaped and has carved bosses.

The south wall with rood stairs is extant. The south transept at the lower level of the chancel forms part of the church room. Between the porch and the nave is a window on the southern wing, which has two openings covered by a "four-centred arch and hood mould." The chancel also has two windows to the south and three windows facing east. The north aisle is in two parts with a higher roof on the eastern side. The Perpendicular window on the east side has two lights. The western part of the church has three-light windows with varied tracery. The west end has a two-light window with cusped lights, square head and hood mould. The south transept has a two-light Perpendicular window. The porch floor is tiled and there are granite benches along the sides. The nave and walls are plastered. The aisle is rebuilt with an archway. The arcade pier is complete on the north side.

The north door, fitted with strap hinges, has a four-centred arch and wave moulding. On the east side, there is a four-centred arched doorway with hood-mould. It contains a recess (probably a niche which housed an image in the past). A former doorway has been converted into the south window of the nave. There is a wooden gate at the entrance to the porch.

== Fittings ==
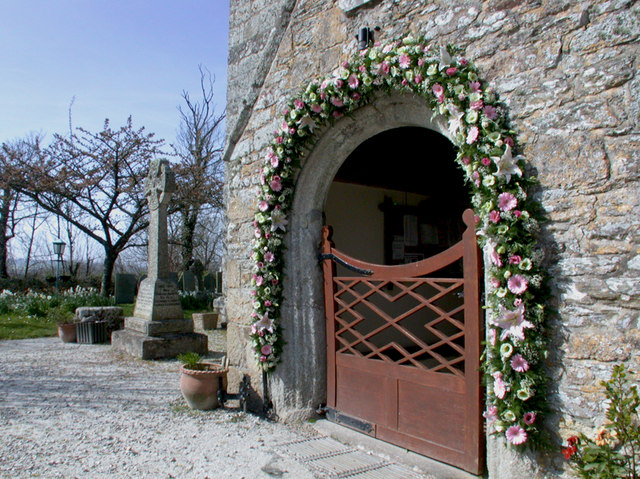
The church's gate

The church housed an octagonal stone font which had decorations of Gothic tracery; all that remains is a fine screen which was part of this font. A chest in the nave has carved panels and a palmette frieze. In 1884, in honour of the vicar who served the parish for 34 years, an etched stained-glass painting of the Ascension was installed in the east window. A window in the tower has a stained glass fitted in honour of the Reverend Mathew Nixon Broughman for his service to the parish as Vicar from 1872 to 1881. The Four Gospels fitted on the window of the west wall have inscriptions in honour of John James Murley and William Paget. The window bears the Arms of Truro and the Arms of Exeter, representing the corresponding dioceses. The four panels of the window also display: Saint Mary, Patron Saint of Truro Cathedral; St Colan holding the Church in his hands; and St Peter, Patron Saint of Exeter Cathedral.

There are also two interesting monumental brasses. That on the north wall is mounted on a slate slab and depicts Francis Bluet with the date 20 May 1572, and Elizabeth Colan his wife, daughter and heiress of Tristram Colan Esq., lord of the Manor of Colan. The brass shows effigies of both, standing on either side of an impaled shield of arms, and figures of their thirteen sons and nine daughters below. He was a younger son of Richard Bluet, of Holcombe Rogus in Devon. The second brass on the south wall of the chancel is that of John Coswarth (or Cosowartha) Receiver General of the Duchy of Cornwall in 1575. This brass was originally fixed in the floor. In the Coswarth Brass, there is a bullet hole which has given rise to two legends. According to one, a Cromwell sympathiser of Coswarth fired at the brass. The second tells how a jilted suitor fired at a lady as she married someone other than her choice. The bullet missed her and struck the brass. The bullet hole can still be seen.

== Grounds ==
The grounds include a graveyard. At the southern entrance to the churchyard, there is a lychgate. The churchyard is home to the listed Thomas Monument, about 8 m (26 ft) south of the tower. Its rectangular slate stone flanked by carved Ionic columns and a round arch bears the inscription "Death spares none", good lettering with verses to Alice Thomas, 1826. There is a war memorial at the back yard of the church honouring the men of the parish who laid down their lives for their country during World War I and II. Close to this memorial, is a 15th-century Gothic cross. This cross, which was untraced for many years, was found near a hedge in 1908 by Dr W. J. Stephens of the Old Cornwall Society. Initially, it was claimed by owners of the property where it was found. In 1970, the Newquay Old Cornwall Society intervened and were successful in having the cross installed in the churchyard. A sundial with a slate gnomon is dated to 1724.
