= Chambré Brabazon Ponsonby =

Irish Member of Parliament

Chambré Brabazon Ponsonby (c.1720 – 20 February 1762) was an Irish Member of Parliament.

He was the son of Major-General Henry Ponsonby by his wife Lady Frances, daughter of Chambré Brabazon, 5th Earl of Meath. His paternal grandfather was William Ponsonby, 1st Viscount Duncannon and Brabazon Ponsonby, 1st Earl of Bessborough was his uncle.

He sat in the Irish House of Commons as member for Newtownards from 1750 to 1761.

== Personal life ==
On 28 September 1746 he married Elizabeth, daughter of Edward Clarke. They had one daughter, Frances, who married George Lowther of Kilrue on 28 July 1767.

He married a second time on 23 October 1752, to Louisa, daughter of Henry Lyons of Belmont. They had one daughter, Sarah Ponsonby, (1755–1831). After Sarah was orphaned by her father's death she was sent to stay with distant relations, Lady Elizabeth "Betty" and Sir William Fownes at the Woodstock Estate near Inistioge, County Kilkenny, where she attended school in Kilkenny. She was deeply unhappy there and received unwanted attentions from Sir William, her guardian. She was befriended by Eleanor Butler, (daughter of Walter Butler of Kilkenny Castle) and they tried to escape together in 1776, but were captured. After Eleanor ran away from home and hid for a time in Sarah's room, supported by Mary Carryl a family servant, they eventually persuaded their families to let them leave in 1778. They moved to Llangollen in North Wales where they set up home with Carryl as housekeeper, and lived at Plas Newydd, where they were known as the Ladies of Llangollen.

By his third wife, Mary, daughter of Sir William Barker, 3rd Baronet of Kilcooly Abbey, he was the father of Mary, who married Thomas Barton of Grove House, Fethard, and of Chambré Brabazon Ponsonby-Barker.
