= Ladies of Llangollen =

Eleanor Butler and Sarah Ponsonby

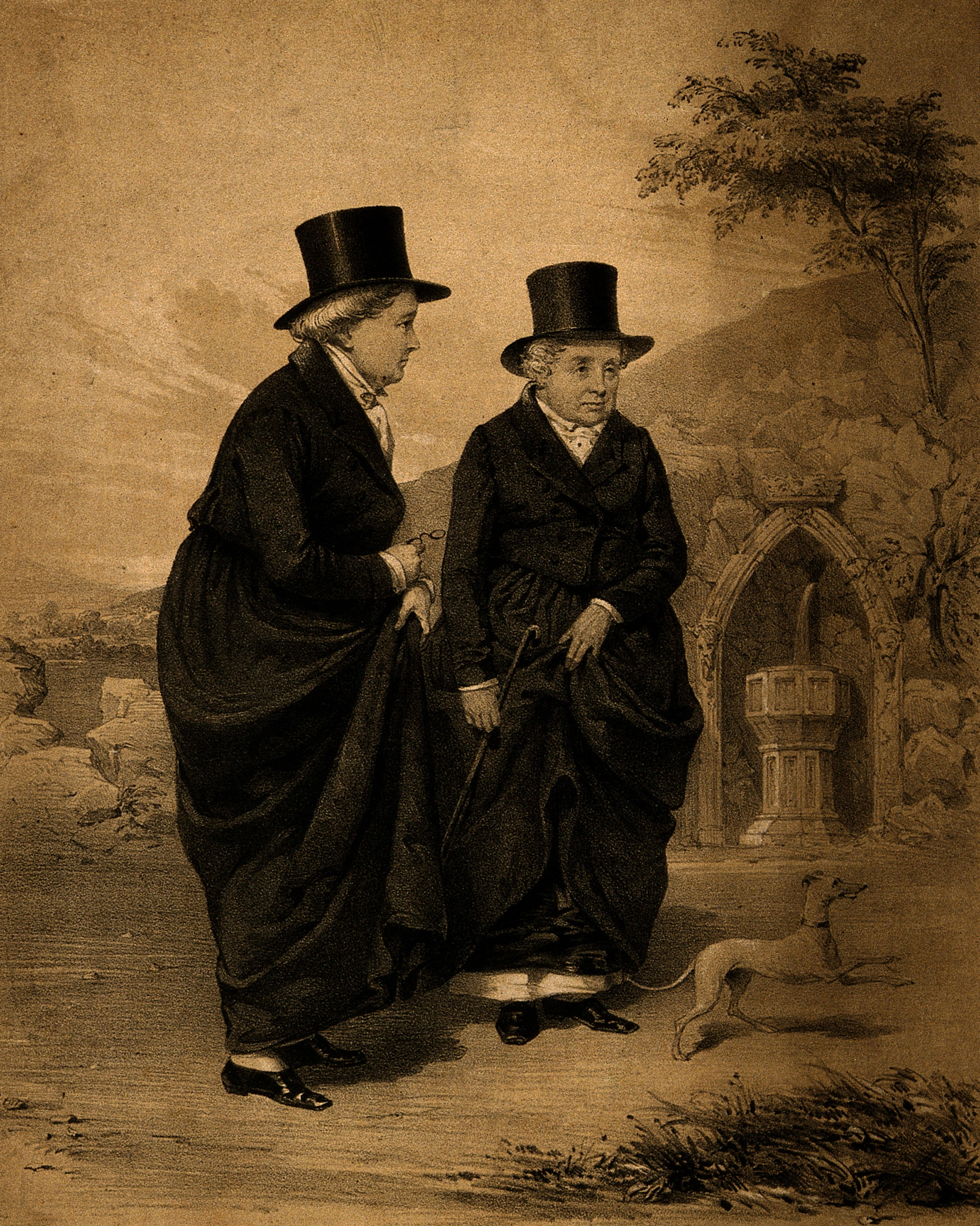
Portrait of The Rt. Hon. Lady Eleanor Butler & Miss Ponsonby 'The Ladies of Llangollen'

The "Ladies of Llangollen", Eleanor Butler (1739–1829) and Sarah Ponsonby (1755–1831), were two upper-class Irish women who lived together as a couple. Their relationship scandalised and fascinated their contemporaries. The pair moved to a Gothic house in Llangollen, North Wales, called Plas Newydd in 1780 after leaving Ireland to escape the social pressures of conventional marriages. Over the years, numerous distinguished visitors called upon them. Guests included Byron, Shelley, Wellington and Wordsworth.

== Early lives ==
Eleanor Charlotte Butler (11 May 1739 – 2 June 1829) was a member of the Butler family, the Earls (and later Dukes) of Ormond, as the daughter of Walter Butler, de jure 16th Earl of Ormonde and Eleanor Morres (1711–1793). Her family, whose seat was Kilkenny Castle, considered her an over-educated bookworm. She was educated in a convent in France and so spoke French.

Sarah Ponsonby (1755 – 9 December 1831), by birth member of the Ponsonby family, was orphaned as a child and lived with relatives in Woodstock, County Kilkenny. A daughter of Chambré Brabazon Ponsonby, Irish Member of Parliament and his second wife, Louisa Lyons (1730–1758). She was a second cousin of Frederick Ponsonby, 3rd Earl of Bessborough, and thus a second cousin once removed of his daughter Lady Caroline Lamb. (Note: Shows extracts from other sources, see in particular Gentleman's Magazine, 1829.)

Their families lived 15 miles (25 km) from each other. The two women met in 1768, and quickly became close. Over the years they formulated a plan for a private rural retreat. It was their dream to live an unconventional life together.

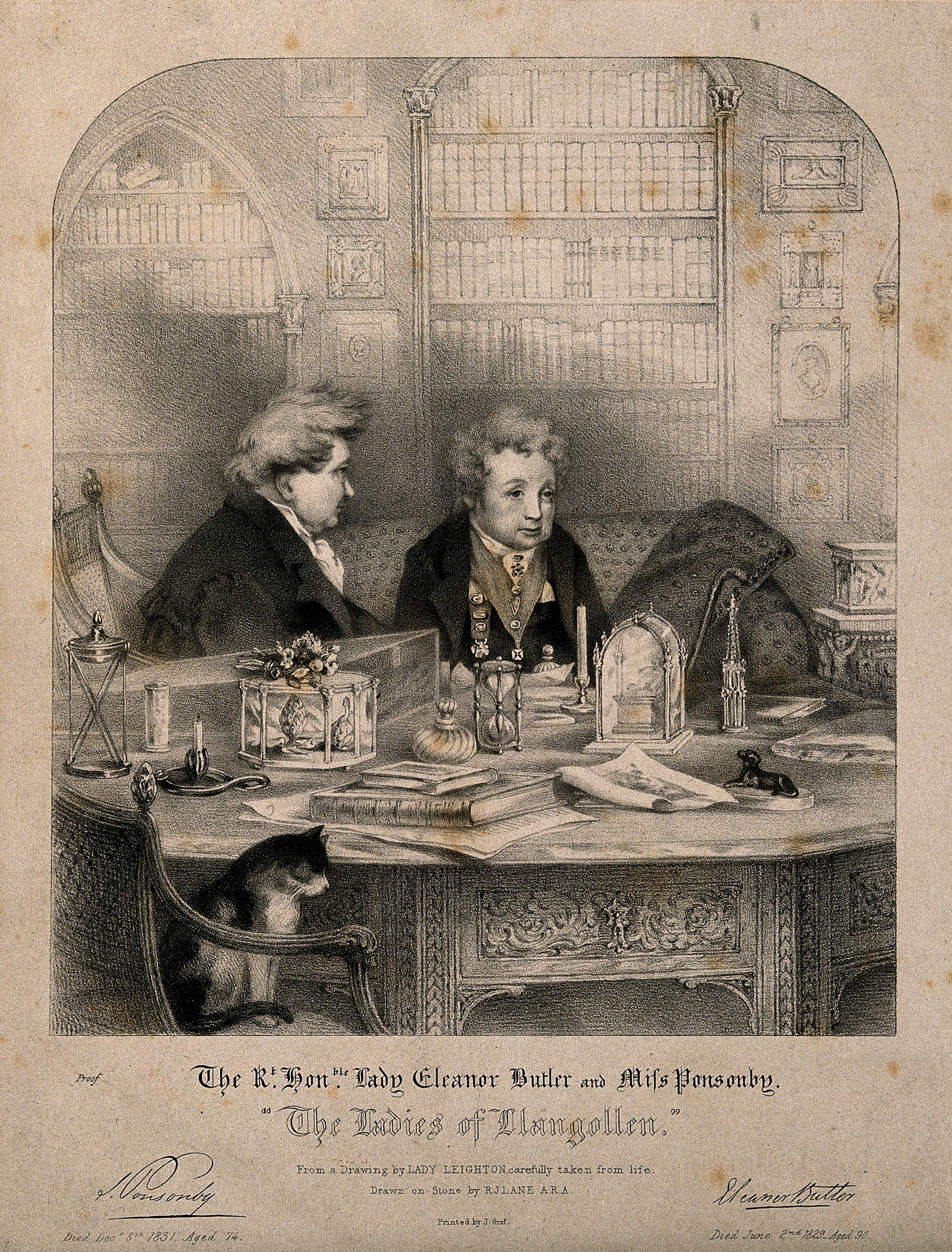
Sarah Ponsonby and Lady Eleanor Butler in their library

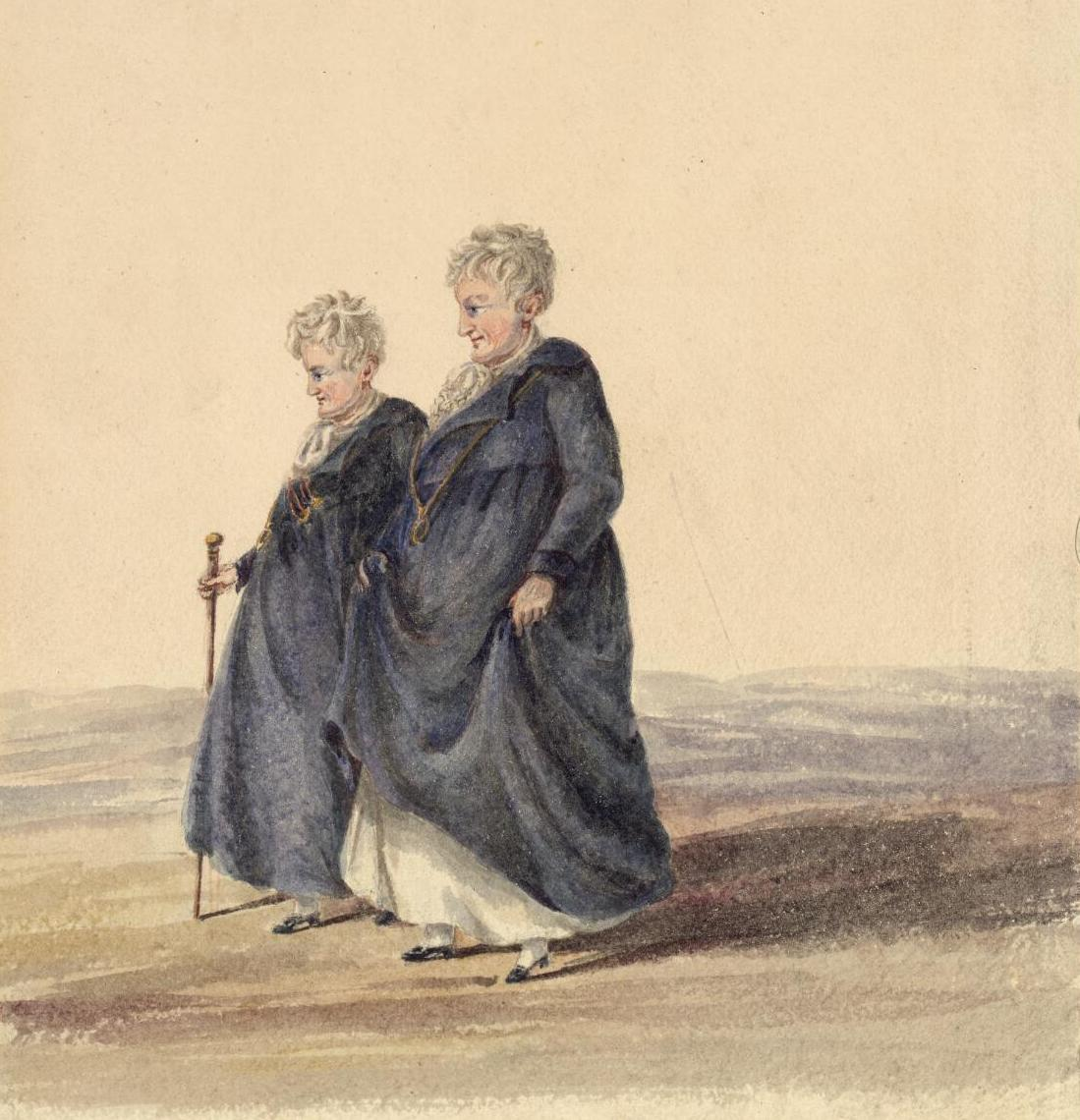
Portrait of Ladies of Llangollen 1819

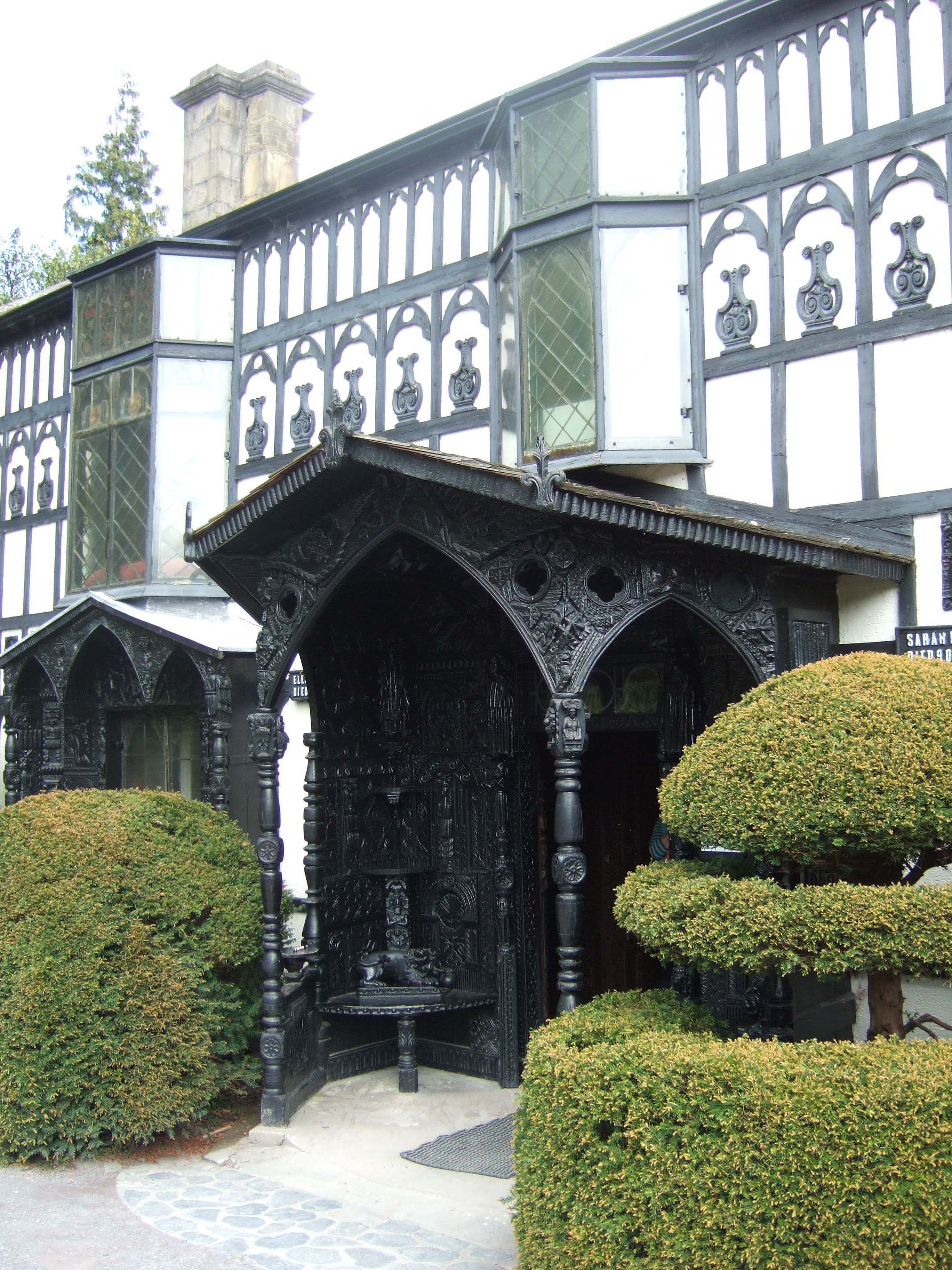
Carved oak porch of Plas Newydd. The house did not look like this during the Ladies' tenure; the exterior woodwork on the walls postdates them, added by a later owner between 1861 and 1890.

== Welsh home ==
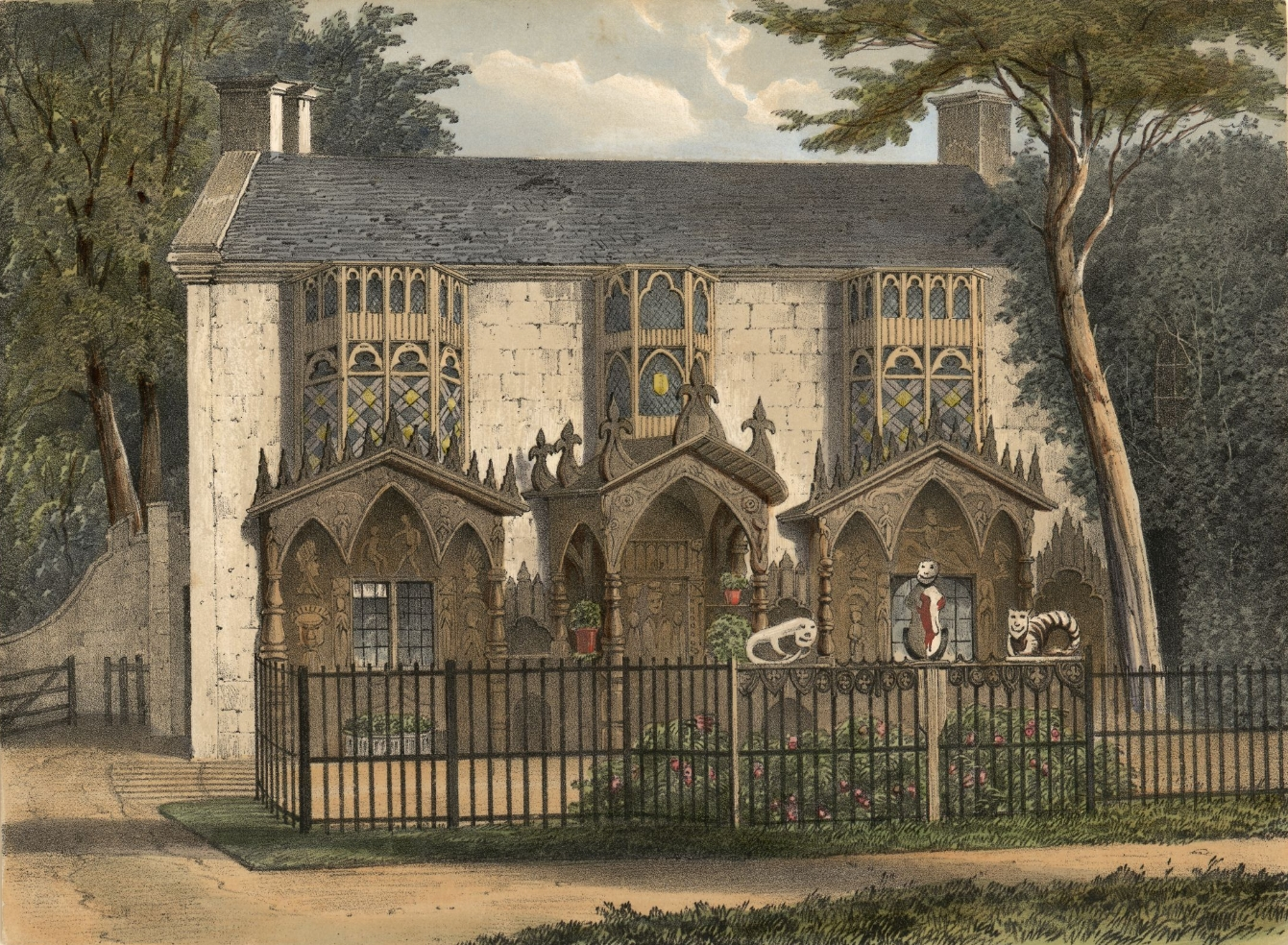
Plas Newydd, near Llangollen, 1840

Rather than face the possibility of being forced into unwanted marriages, they left County Kilkenny together in April 1778. Their families found them and forcefully tried to make them give up their plans—but in vain. They moved to Wales and then sent for Sarah's servant, Mary Caryll, who lived with and worked for them for the rest of her life. Mary died first, and they were all three buried in the same plot with the same grave marker.

Putting their plan into motion, they undertook a picturesque tour of the Welsh countryside, eventually settling in North Wales. Living first in a rented home in the village of Llangollen, they moved in 1780 to a small cottage just outside the village they called Plas Newydd or "new mansion". They proceeded to live according to their self-devised system, though they could rely on only a modest income from intolerant relatives, and eventually a civil list pension. They "improved" Plas Newydd in the Gothic style with Welsh oak panelling, pointed arches, stained glass windows, and an extensive library, in which they received their many guests. They hired a gardener, a footman, and two maids. This led to significant debt, and they had to rely on the generosity of friends.

== Recognition and popularity ==
They devoted their time to hosting a range of friends and curious visitors, extensive correspondence, private studies of literature and languages, and improving their estate. Over the years they added a circular stone dairy and created a sumptuous garden. Eleanor kept a diary of their activities. Llangollen people simply referred to them as "the ladies".

After a couple of years, their life attracted the interest of the outside world. Their house became a haven for visitors travelling between Dublin and London, including writers such as Anna Seward, Robert Southey, Percy Shelley, Lord Byron and Sir Walter Scott, but also the military leader the Duke of Wellington and the industrialist Josiah Wedgwood; aristocratic novelist Lady Caroline Lamb, who was born a Ponsonby, came to visit too. William Wordsworth came to visit and even dedicated a sonnet to the ladies (“Sisters in love, a love allowed to climb / Ev’n on this earth, above the reach of time.”) Anne Lister from Yorkshire visited the couple, and was possibly inspired by their relationship to informally marry her own lover. Even travellers from continental Europe had heard of the couple and came to visit them, for instance Prince Hermann von Pückler-Muskau, the German nobleman and landscape designer, wrote admiringly about them.

The ladies were known throughout Britain, but have been said to have led "a rather unexciting life". It is sometimes claimed that members of the British Royal Family, including Queen Charlotte, visited Butler and Ponsonby at Plas Newydd, but no firm evidence supports any such visits. There is likewise no documentary basis for the assertion that Queen Charlotte secured a pension for them. A £100 pension granted in 1788 was obtained via Lord Mornington through William Pitt and George III, while a £200 pension awarded in 1829 was requested by the Duke of Wellington. Queen Charlotte’s only verified connection with the ladies is that a plan of their garden and house was submitted to her in 1785, although contemporary correspondence suggests that Queen Charlotte did not examine it because it had been impregnated with perfume, which she disliked.

== Personal lives ==
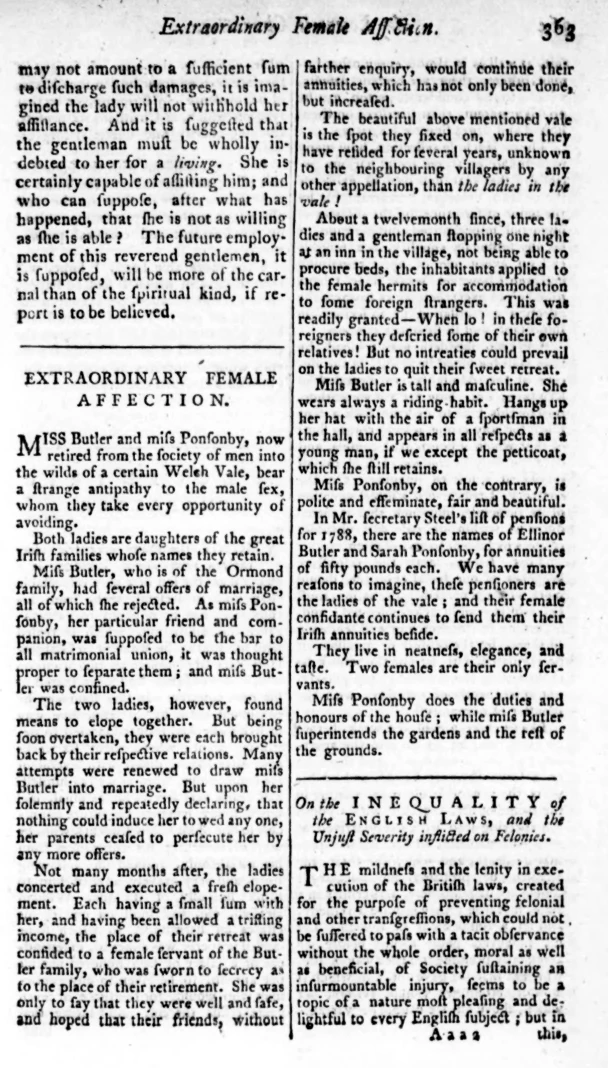
Town & Country Magazine article on the "Ladies in the Vale"

Butler and Ponsonby lived together for 50 years. Their books and glassware carried both sets of initials and their letters were jointly signed. Towards the end of their lives, they both dressed in black riding habits and men's top hats; some visitors thought it was eccentric and outdated – especially the hair powder – but neighbours thought the clothes were practical for living outdoors.

Rumours that they were in a sexual relationship floated around during and after their lives. In 1791, a magazine described them and implied that they were in a sexual relationship. According to Patricia Hampl, they were appalled by this idea, and objected to the magazine's characterisation to the point of consulting Edmund Burke over the possibility of suing the magazine for libel.

In sharp contrast to the writings of their contemporary Anne Lister, there is nothing in their extensive correspondence or diaries that indicates a sexual relationship. Some consider Butler's and Ponsonby's relationship to be a Boston marriage, or a romantic relationship between two women who chose to live together and have "marriage-like relationships". Others conclude that the two had a non-sexual romantic friendship. Norena Shopland says that modern attitudes designed to distinguish same-sex relationships from a romantic friendship indicate they had a sexual relationship. According to Fiona Brideoake, the description of queer is more appropriate than the specific label of lesbian, particularly as queerness is a broad concept and significantly defined by its difference from typicality. Brideoake writes that their relationship was celebrated by the poet Anna Seward as a form of mourning the relationships that she could not form.

Eugene Coyle recounts that a "succession of their pet dogs were named 'Sappho'."

== Deaths and legacy ==
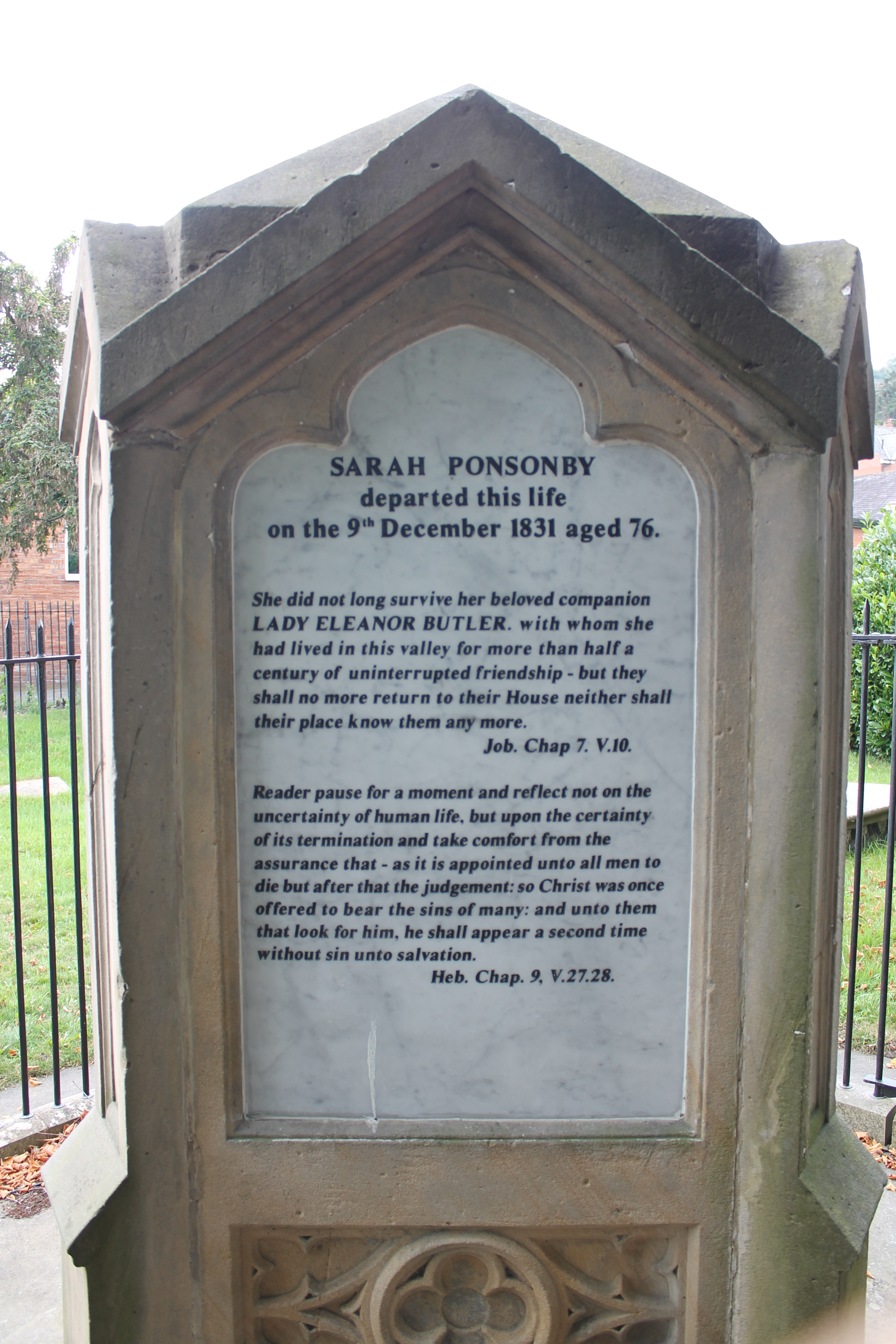
Memorial in St Collen's graveyard

Mary Caryll died on 22 November 1809. Eleanor Butler died on 2 June 1829 at the age of 90. Sarah Ponsonby died two years later on 9 December 1831, age 76. They are all buried together at St Collen’s Church, Llangollen. Plas Newydd is now a museum run by Denbighshire County Council.

Butler's Hill, near Plas Newydd, is named in honour of Eleanor Butler. The Ponsonby Arms public house, a Grade II listed building on Mill Street in Llangollen, claims to take its name from Sarah Ponsonby.

== In popular culture ==
- Wordsworth wrote a sonnet about them, "To the Lady E.B and the Hon. Miss P".
- Anna Seward wrote about them in her 1796 poem, "Llangollen Vale", in which she associates them with "chaste provinciality".
- The story of the two women are the subject of a chapter of Colette's 1932 book, The Pure and the Impure.
- The ladies appeared in a "thinly-veiled biographical novel", Chase of the Wild Goose by pioneering female physician and author, Mary Gordon, originally published in 1936 by Leonard and Virginia Woolf at the Hogarth Press. The book was reprinted and retitled The Llangollen Ladies: The Story of Lady Eleanor Butler and Miss Sarah Ponsonby, Known as the Ladies of Llangollen. Gordon claims to have seen the ladies' apparitions at Plas Newydd during a visit in 1934, which inspired her to learn about their lives. As Gordon recounts in the final section of the book, "The Ladies Meet Me", she believed herself to be Butler and Ponsonby's "spiritual descendant", and hailed them as the feminist progenitors of the modernist female scholars, professionals, and "friends who prefer to live together." Gordon used her royalties from the book to commission a statue of Butler and Ponsonby sculpted by Violet Labouchere, and stood herself as the model for Ponsonby. The statue was installed in St. Collen's Church, Llangollen (where the Ladies are buried with Mary Carryl) in a ceremony overseen by the minister and local mayor.
- The ladies' story (along with their ghost story) is told in a chapter of the 2009 book, Queer Hauntings: True Tales of Gay and Lesbian Ghosts by Ken Summers.
- In April 2011, the same month in which the first Irish civil partnerships took place under the Civil Partnership and Certain Rights and Obligations of Cohabitants Act 2010, Irish state broadcaster RTÉ broadcast a 45-minute radio documentary about the lives of Eleanor Butler and Sarah Ponsonby entitled An Extraordinary Affair. It asked whether they were Ireland's first openly lesbian couple.
- In 2014, Llangollen, the Ladies and Plas Newydd were featured in the introductory sequence of the BBC property buying series Escape to the Country, series 22, episode 21, North Wales.
- In February 2016, the Ladies of Llangollen were featured in episode 7 of series 3 of Mysteries at the Castle on the Travel Channel.
- In February 2020, the burial place and memorial of the Ladies were blessed at a special service for LGBT History Month at St Collen's Church, Llangollen. A tribute to the legacy of the Ladies was given in music by Ian Shaw.
- In 2022, their dramatised story was brought to the stage in Theatr Clwyd's production of Celebrated Virgins: The Story of the Ladies of Llangollen, written by Katie Elin Salt and directed by Eleri B.Jones.
- They are referred to as "a pair of Irish cousins" who ran away to Wales in Learned by Heart (2023) by Emma Donoghue.
- In Zadie Smith's novel The Fraud, protagonist Mrs Touchet repeatedly alludes to them longingly in the context of her own "persuasion."
- The Ladies of Llangollen are featured in Anthony Delaney's Queer Georgians: a Hidden History of Lovers, Lawbreakers and Homemakers (2025).
