= Gruffudd Hiraethog =

Welsh poet (died 1564)

Gruffudd Hiraethog (died 1564) was a 16th-century Welsh-language poet, born in Llangollen, north-east Wales.

Gruffudd was one of the foremost poets of the sixteenth century to use the cywydd metre. He was a prolific author and gifted scholar. Though he was member of the medieval guild of poets and a notable upholder of that tradition, he was also closely associated with William Salesbury, Wales' leading Renaissance scholar. He is buried in the vault of the Church of St Collen in Llangollen.

One of the first Welsh books to be published was Gruffudd's collection of proverbs in 1547, Oll synnwyr pen Kembero ygyd ("The sense of a Welshman's mind collected together").
