= Samuel Pountney Smith =

English architect

Samuel Pountney Smith JP (2 November 1812 – 5 November 1883) was an English architect who practised in Shrewsbury, Shropshire, England.

Smith was a native of Munslow, where he was baptised on 17 December 1812, in Corvedale, Shropshire, son of an innkeeper, Edward Smith and his wife Anne. He learned the trades of builder and architect with his uncle John Smalman at Quatford near Bridgnorth, and came to Shrewsbury in about 1840 after working in the latter's business.

The National Heritage List for England shows that his major works were mainly in Shropshire, with occasional works in the neighbouring county of Herefordshire. He also carried out some works nearby in North Wales. An example of his Welsh work is St Collen’s Church, Llangollen. According to the authors of the Buildings of England series, his work was strongly influenced by A. W. N. Pugin, and his designs were mainly in Early English style. His output was mainly in relation to churches, designing new churches and carrying out alterations or restorations on others, his most important restoration being that of St Mary Magdalene, Battlefield. Smith also received domestic commissions to design new houses (e.g.: Llantysilio Hall, home of Charles Beyer), and to alter others, including The Limes, in Belle Vue, Shrewsbury, which he remodelled for his own use.

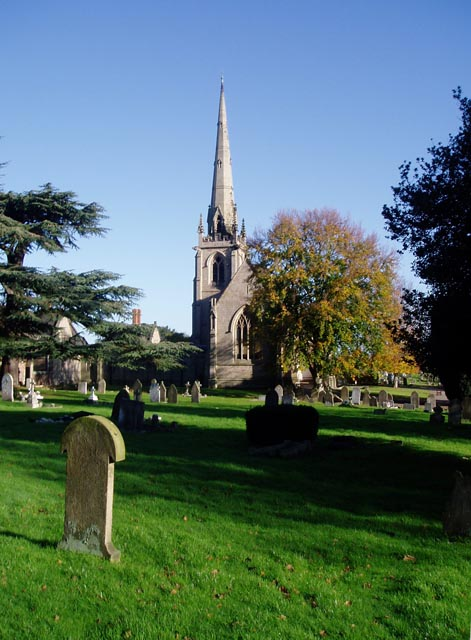
Shrewsbury Cemetery, whose buildings he designed and where he is buried (his gravestone not shown).

He was a JP for the borough of Shrewsbury and was for a time a Conservative borough councillor, serving as Mayor of Shrewsbury in 1873-74, until narrowly losing an election in 1876. However he was elected alderman from outside council in 1877 and served until he died, three days before the end of his six-year term of office.

Smith died at The Limes, after three months' paralysis, in 1883 aged seventy-one, and was buried in the Shrewsbury General Cemetery in Longden Road. He was architect of its church and ancillary buildings.

== See also ==
- List of works by Samuel Pountney Smith
