= Collen =

7th-century monk

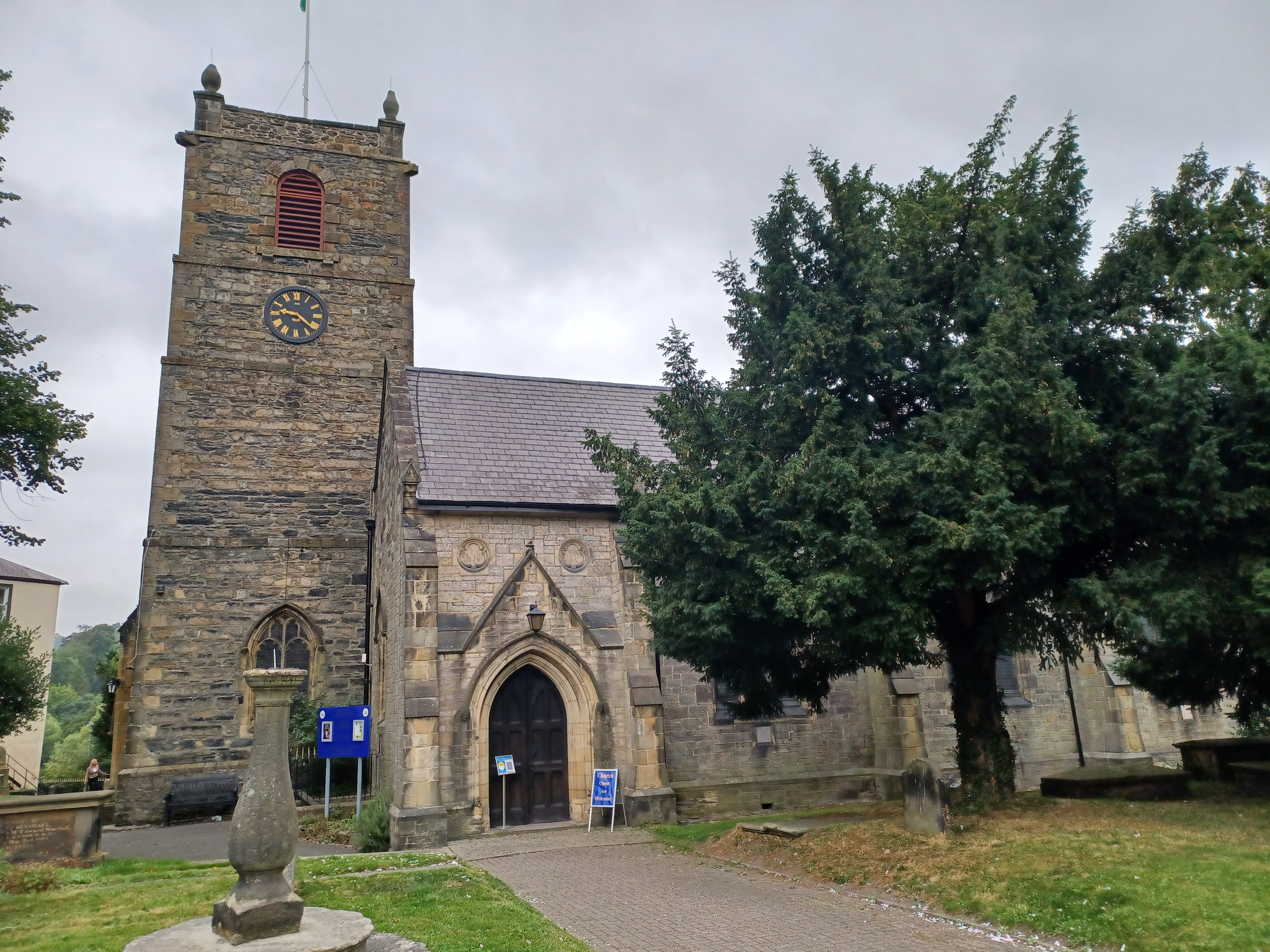
St Collen's Church, Llangollen

Collen was a 7th-century monk who gave his name to Llangollen (from the Welsh llan meaning 'enclosure' and gollen being a mutation of "Collen").

Collen is said to have served for some time abroad as a soldier. He later arrived in Llangollen by coracle and founded a church beside the river there. As there are no other churches in Wales dedicated to Collen, it is possible that this Saint Collen may also have connections in both Colan, Cornwall, where Colan Church is dedicated to him, and Langolen, Brittany. There are legendary Lives connecting him with Wales, Rome and Glastonbury, but nothing is known for certain about him, though from the dedication of a church to him in Brittany it may be conjectured that he resided for some time in that country.

== Narrative ==
According to the Buchedd Collin ('Life of Saint Collin'), he was the son of Gwynawc, ab Caledawc. After having travelled through many foreign lands he returned to Britain and became Abbot of Glastonbury. He banished Gwyn ap Nudd, King of the Tylwyth Teg, and his retinue from Glastonbury Tor with the use of holy water.

Collen died on 22 May, probably sometime in the early 7th century. He was buried in his chapel. For centuries, it was known as the "Old Church" and stood immediately to the west of the present medieval church of St Collen in Llangollen.
