= Mary Carryl =

Irish servant

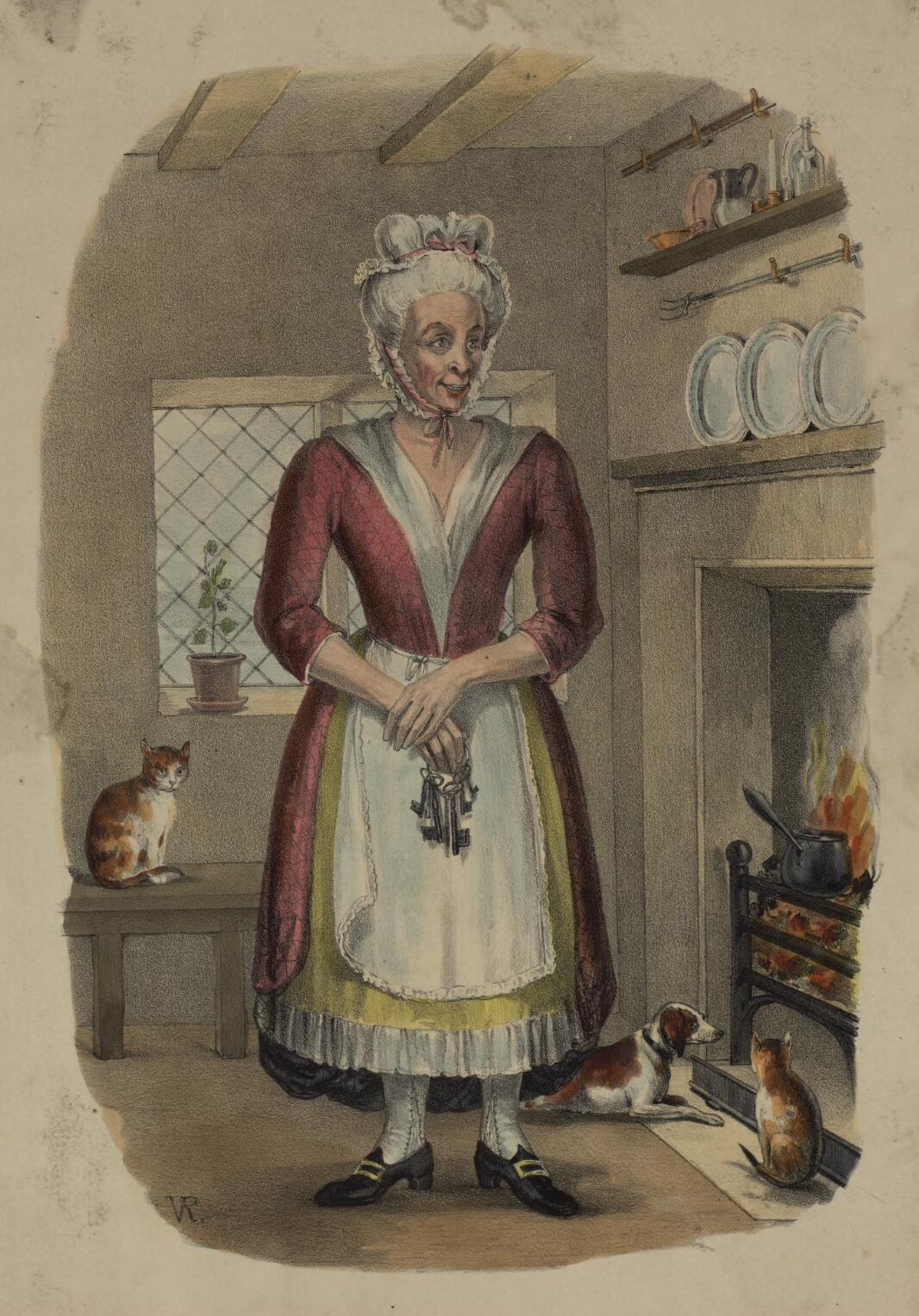
- Mrs. Mary Carryl
- Born: Probably Ross, County Wexford
- Died: 22 November 1809; Plas Newydd
- Occupations: servant, companion
- Employer: Ladies of Llangollen

Mary Carryl (died 22 November 1809) was an Irish-born loyal servant and friend of the celebrated Ladies of Llangollen. She served them up to her death; and when the Ladies died, they shared the same grave.

== Early life in Ireland ==
Mary Carryl was brought up in a poor family in Ross in County Wexford. Little is known about her until she was employed by Lady Elizabeth "Betty" and Sir William Fownes, 2nd Baronet, at the Woodstock Estate near Inistioge, County Kilkenny, Ireland. He inherited the baronetcy from his father Sir William Fownes, 1st Baronet, the Mayor of Dublin, and over 21,000 acres from his grandfather. When Fownes married Elizabeth Ponsonby, he had received £4,000 as a dowry and the couple built the six-bayed, three-storey Woodstock House in County Kilkenny in 1745–7. In 1769, the Fownes had a thirteen-year-old guest to stay for some time named Sarah Ponsonby, who was Elizabeth's cousin and the orphaned daughter of Chambré Brabazon Ponsonby. She attended school at Kilkenny.

Sarah developed a friendship with Eleanor Butler, which was not approved of by the Fownes nor by Eleanor's family guardians. When the friendship began, Sarah was an unhappy thirteen-year-old orphan; she was captivated by the well-educated Eleanor Butler, a 30-year-old spinster no longer considered marriageable. Sarah was also receiving unwanted attention from Sir William, her guardian.

When Eleanor Butler ran away from home, she was hidden in Sarah's room and Mary smuggled in food for her stowaway. Eventually Butler and Ponsonby agreed that they could leave Ireland together. They went to Llangollen in Wales where they set up home in a cottage called Plas Newydd. Meanwhile, Mary, who was known as Mary the Bruiser, had been fired after throwing a candlestick that wounded another servant. Mary's prospects were saved when Eleanor and Sarah sent for her to come to Llangollen.

== Life in Llangollen ==
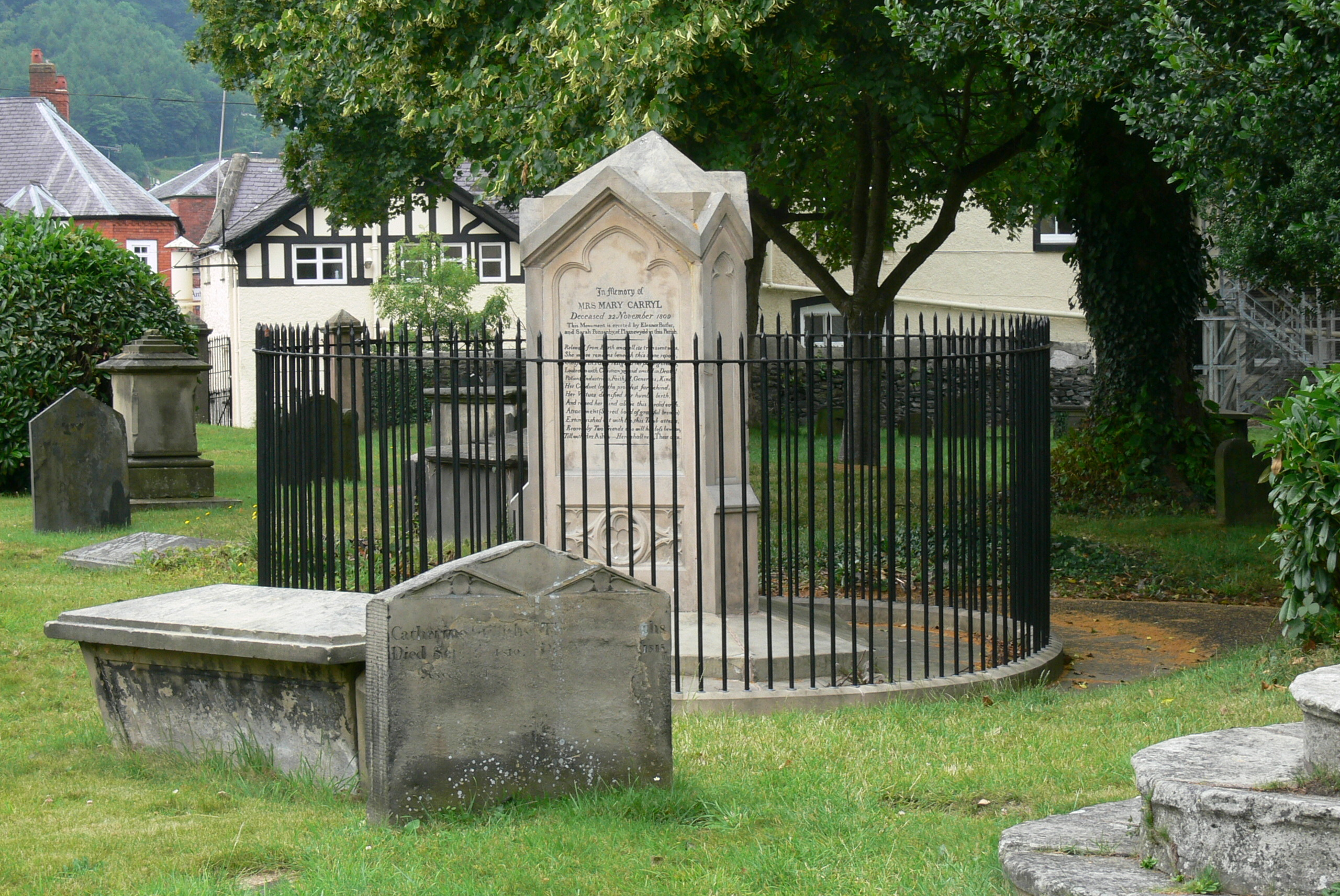
Mary Carryl's memorial is shared with the Ladies of Llangollen in the local church

In time Eleanor and Sarah would become notorious as "The Ladies of Llangollen", and Carryl became both their servant and the head of the household. She was loyal to her employers. She was said to have "masculine qualities" and Lady Eleanor's diary records how she would give as good as she got as she bargained loudly with the fishermen, the butchers and the inebriated.

The lifestyle of the Ladies of Llangollen attracted attention. They would receive notable visitors including the Duke of Wellington; the poets William Wordsworth and Anna Seward; enlightenment leaders Erasmus Darwin and Josiah Wedgewood; and writers including Sir Walter Scott.

Carryl died in Plas Newydd in 1809 and was buried in the churchyard of St Collen’s Church, Llangollen. She left a shilling to her brother and sister, but she left the field she owned to Sarah. When in time the Ladies of Llangollen died, they were buried beside their faithful servant.

== Commemoration ==
The memorial monument to Mary Carryl, Eleanor Butler and Sarah Ponsonby in the churchyard of St. Collen's Church was erected in 1810. The inscription on Mary Carryl's part of the monument reads: "In Memory of/ Mrs Mary Carryl/ Deceased 22 November 1809/ This monument is erected by Eleanor Butler,/ and Sarah Ponsonby, of Plasnewydd in this Parish./ Released from Earth and all its transient woes,/ She whose remains beneath this stone repose,/ Stedfast in Faith resigned her parting breath,/ Looked up with Christian joy, and smiled in Death!/ Patient, Industrious, Faithful, Generous, Kind,/ Her Conduct left the proudest far behind,/ Her Virtues dignified her humble birth,/ And raised her mind above this sordid earth,/ Attachment (Sacred bond of grateful breasts)/ Extinguished but with life, this Tomb attests,/ Reared by Two Friends who will her loss bemoan,/ 'Till with Her Ashes...Here shall rest, Their own."
