= St Collen's Church, Llangollen =

Coordinates: 52.9694°N 3.1677°W

St Collen's Church
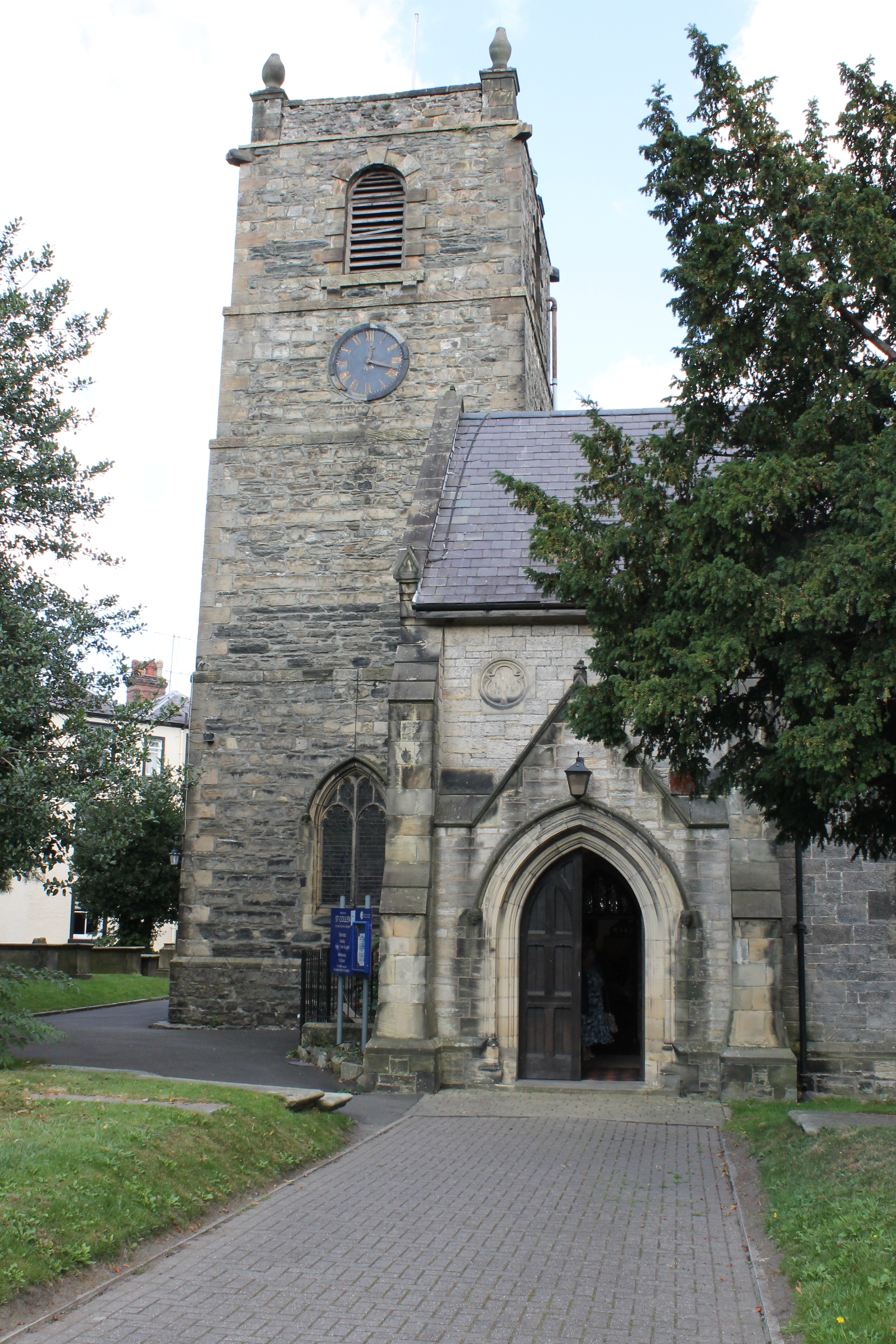
- Tower and porch

- Location in Denbighshire
- Location: Llangollen, Denbighshire
- Country: Wales
- Denomination: Church in Wales
- Website: St Collen's Church

Architecture
- Functional status: Active
- Heritage designation: Grade I
- Designated: 24 April 1951
- Architect: Samuel Pountney Smith (restoration)
- Architectural type: Church
- Style: Gothic Revival
- Groundbreaking: 13th century
- Completed: 1864–1867; 159 years ago

Specifications
- Materials: Body of church: rubble Roof: slate

St Collen's Church is a parish church in the town of Llangollen, Denbighshire, Wales. The first church on the site was founded by Collen in the 6th century. Nothing of this building remains. A new church was built in the 13th century, in the Early English Gothic style. This was developed in the succeeding centuries, and then almost completely rebuilt in the 19th century. The architect of the Victorian reconstruction was Samuel Pountney Smith, who retained little of the earlier church, with the exception of the tower. The churchyard contains the grave of the Ladies of Llangollen, Eleanor Charlotte Butler and Sarah Ponsonby, and their servant Mary Carryl, who lived at the nearby Plas Newydd. In November 2021 the first blessing of a gay partnership in a Church in Wales church was held at St Collen's. The church is an active parish church in the Diocese of St Asaph. It is designated by Cadw as a Grade I listed building.

== History ==
Collen was a monk from Glastonbury who is reputed to have arrived in Llangollen in a coracle and founded the first church on the site in the 6th century. (Note: Collen ap Gwynnarg ap Cowdra ap Caradog Freichfras ap Lleyr Merim ap Einion Yrth ap Cunedda Wledig is recorded as a Welsh nobleman who became Abbot of Glastonbury in manuscripts held in the Llangollen Museum.) (Note: Saint Collen's dates are given variously as the 6th or the 7th centuries. Similarly, his arrival in Llangollen is recorded as by coracle or on horseback.) It is the only church in Wales with a dedication to Saint Collen. In the 13th century, a new church was built on the site and developed further in the following centuries. Of this building, the major remaining element is the tower, which dates from the 18th century. The Welsh poet Gruffudd Hiraethog (died 1564), who was born in the town, is buried in the vault of the church.

In the early 19th century, the church was the place of worship of Eleanor Butler and Sarah Ponsonby, the Ladies of Llangollen, whose house, Plas Newydd, was situated just outside of the town. They are buried in the churchyard. Between 1864 and 1867 the church was almost completely rebuilt by Samuel Pountney Smith. St Collen's remains an active parish church in the Diocese of St Asaph. On 13 November 2021, the church was the first in Wales to hold a blessing for a same-sex partnership, following a change to Church in Wales rules in September 2021. The ceremony, for the vicar of St Collen's Father Lee Taylor and his partner, was conducted by Gregory Cameron, the Bishop of St Asaph.

== Architecture ==
=== Structure ===
The 13th-century church was of a double-nave design. Little of this building now remains, although a fragment of a medieval stone shrine has been incorporated into the current structure. The unusual arrangement whereby part of the church forms part of the churchyard boundary may also reflect its medieval origins. The present church is mainly the work of Smith, who undertook a mid-Victorian reconstruction. The 18th-century tower was retained on grounds of cost. The building has triple aisles and is constructed of coursed rubble with a slate roof. The tower has four storeys and the architectural historian Edward Hubbard, in his 2003 Clwyd volume of the Pevsner Buildings of Wales, records its urn-like pinnacles. The internal hammerbeam roof in the nave has elaborate wood carving and is reputed to have been brought from Valle Crucis Abbey, but both Cadw and Hubbard doubt this attribution. This roof, and another in the north aisle, are medieval and feature Celtic motifs and imagery. The church is a Grade I listed building.

=== Fittings and furniture ===
The church contains an important series of Victorian stained glass by, among others, Alexander Gibbs, Done & Davies and William Holland. The font also dates from the reconstruction. Hubbard describes it as "gigantic and exuberant". The RCAHMW survey notes the "finely carved" sedilia and piscina.

== Churchyard ==
Eleanor Butler and Sarah Ponsonby met in 1768 and left their native Ireland a decade later to escape the threat of forced marriages. Setting up home just outside of Llangollen, they maintained a near 60-year partnership which both fascinated and scandalised 19th-century Britain. On the death of their servant Mary Carryl in 1809, the women erected a tomb for her in the churchyard at St Collen's. It was designed by Thomas Parker. They were interred in the tomb on their own deaths in 1829 and 1831. The monument is a Grade II listed structure. A sundial in the churchyard and a wall to the north of the church are also listed at Grade II.

== Gallery ==
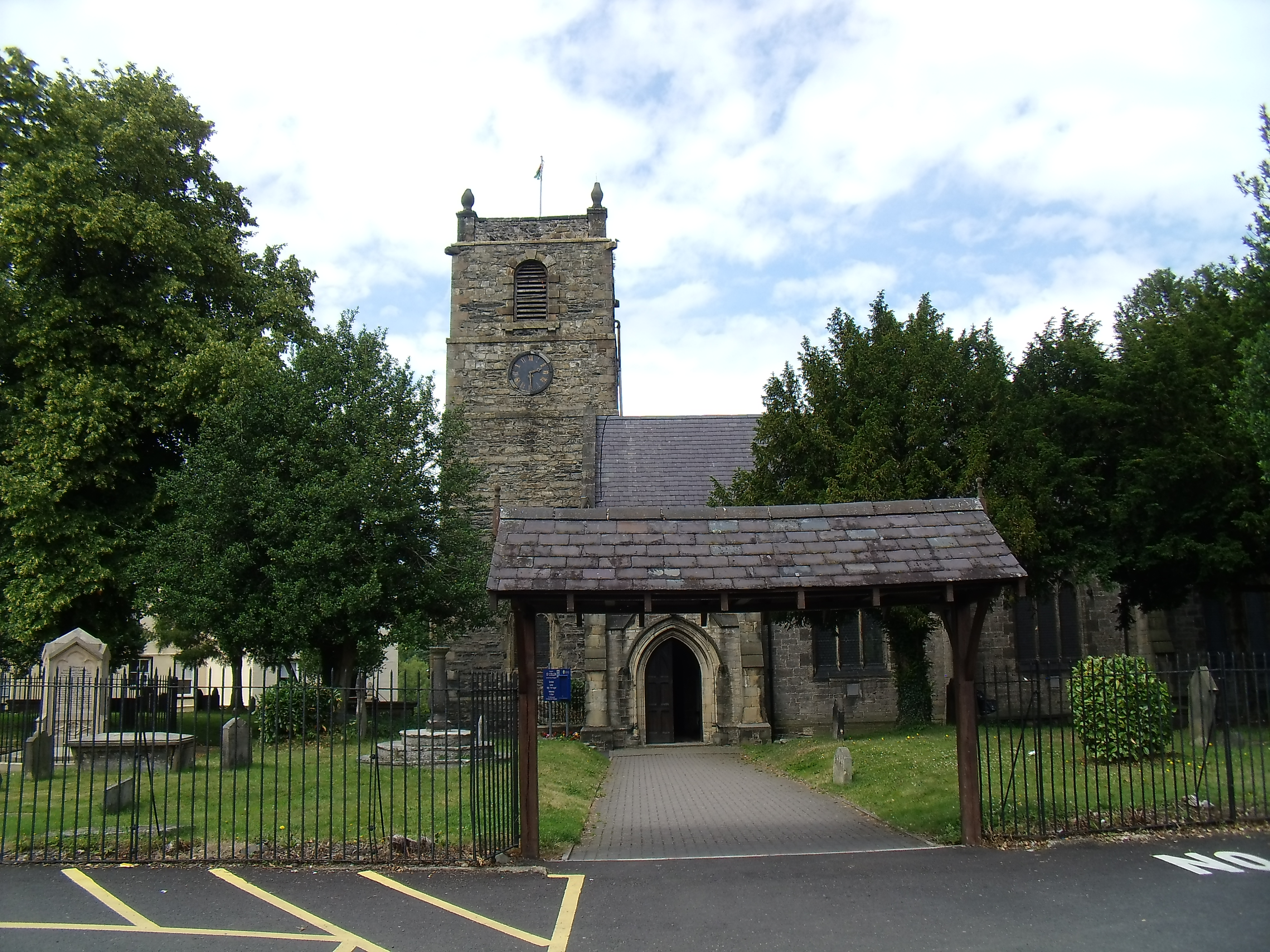
Church and lych gate

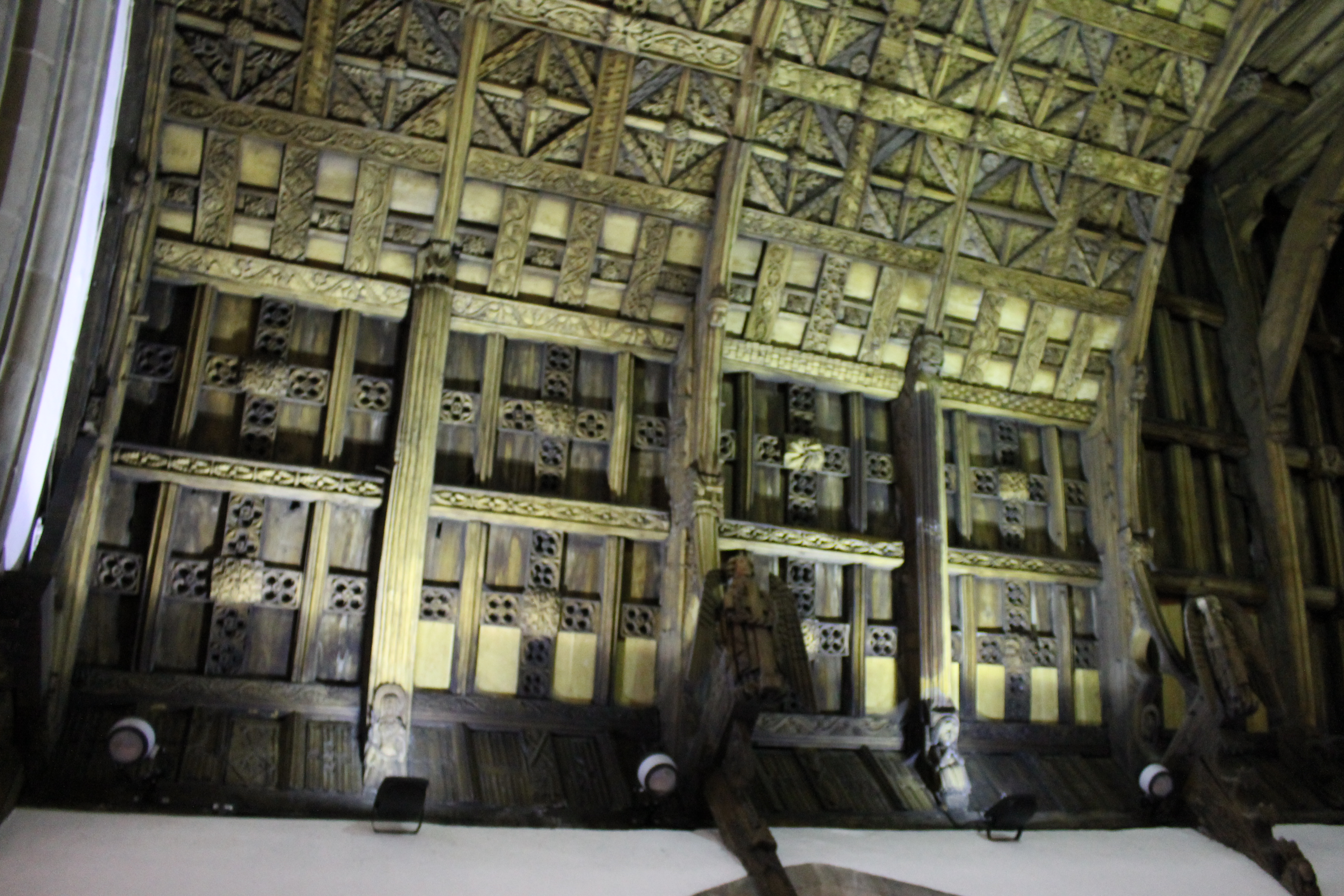
Ceiling of the nave

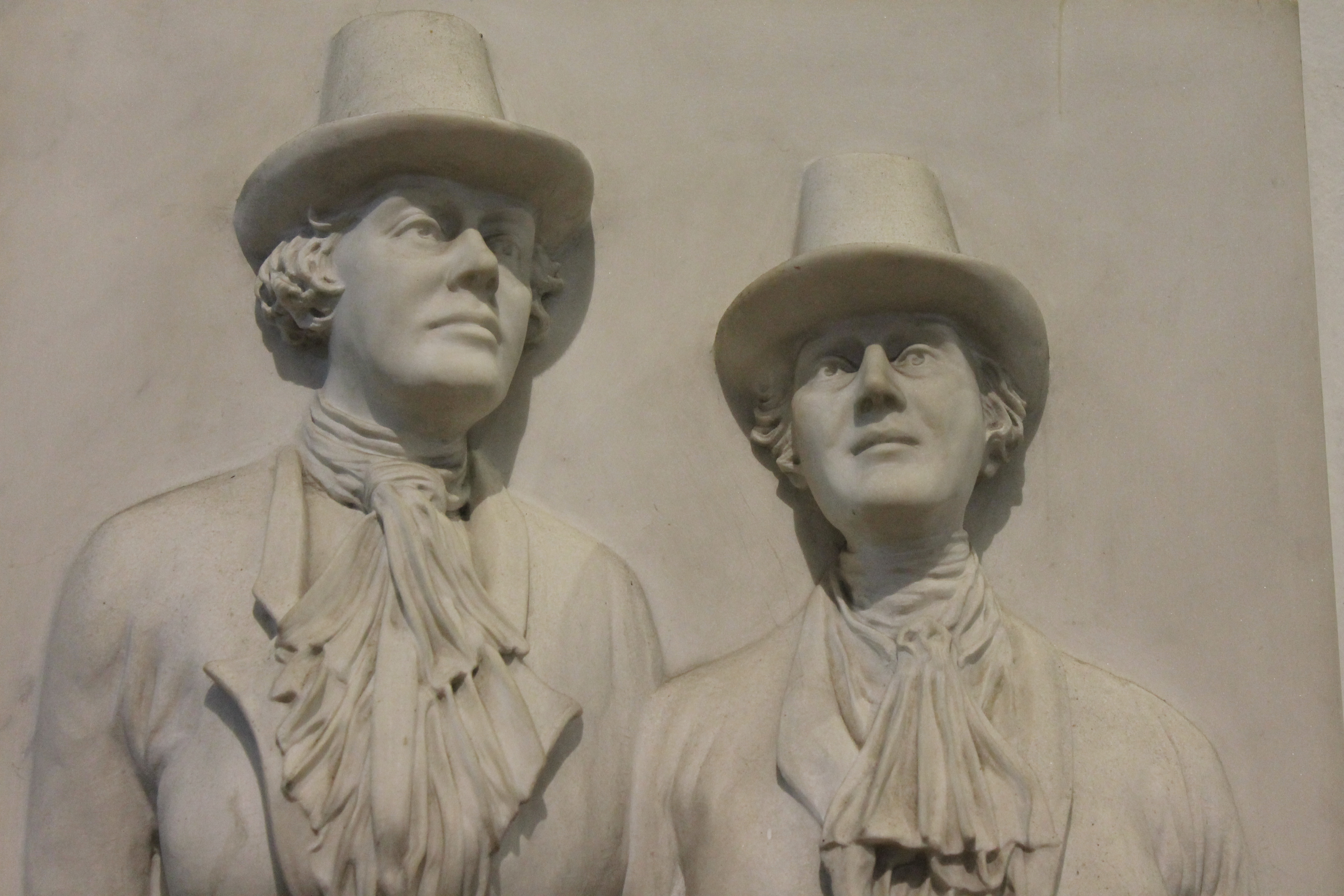
Memorial in the church to the Ladies of Llangollen

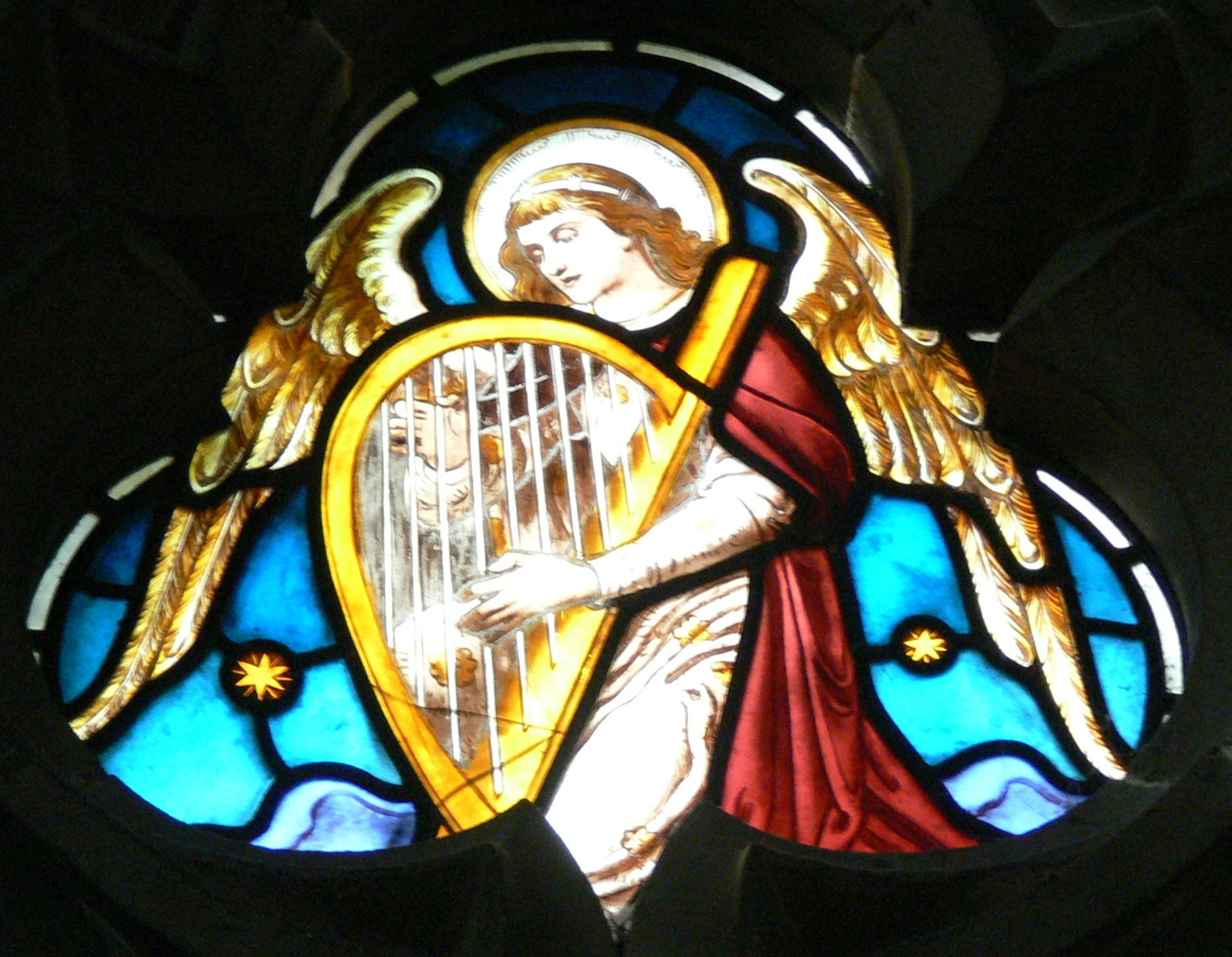
Victorian stained glass

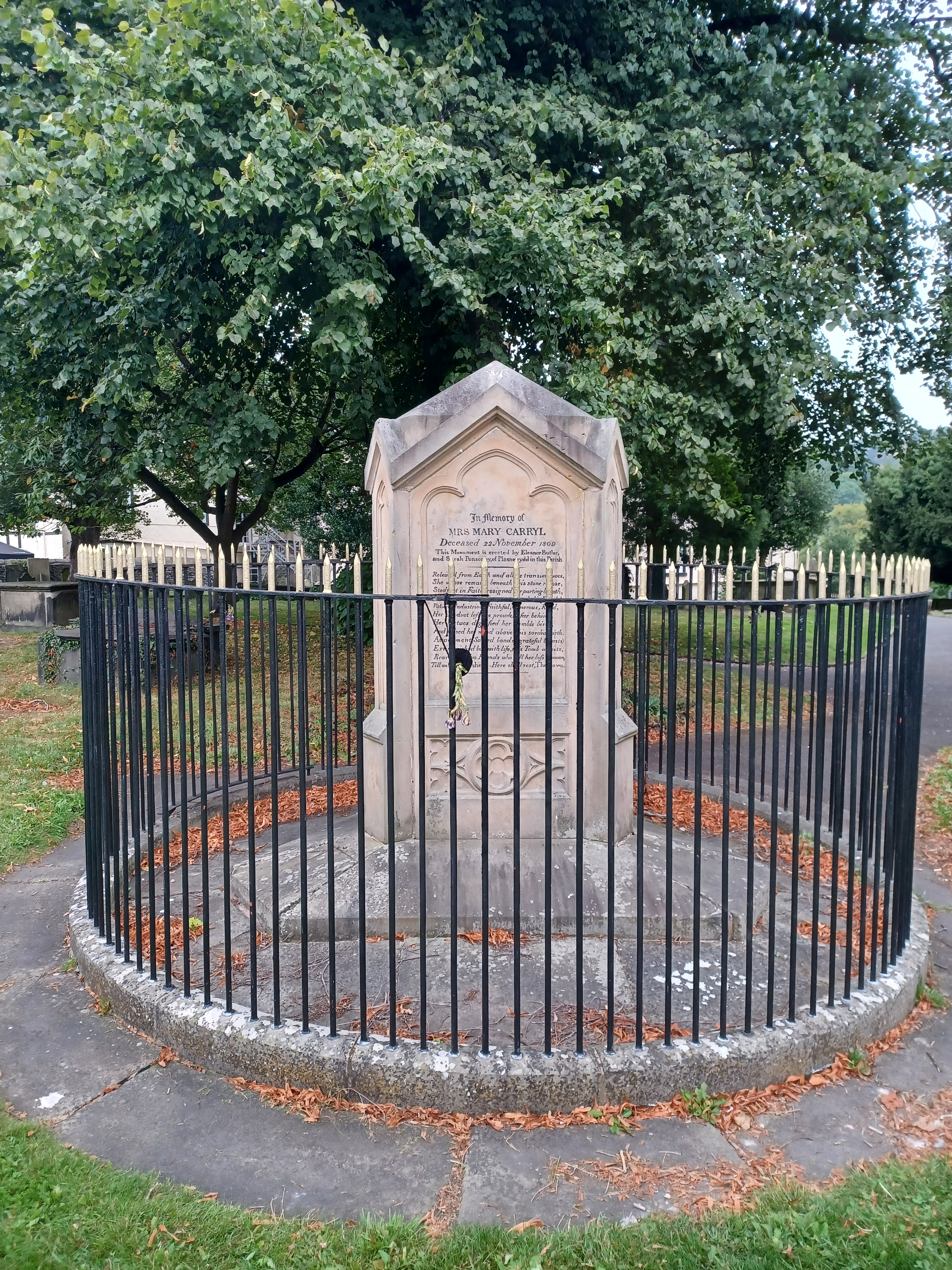
Tomb of Eleanor Butler, Sarah Ponsonby and Mary Carryl

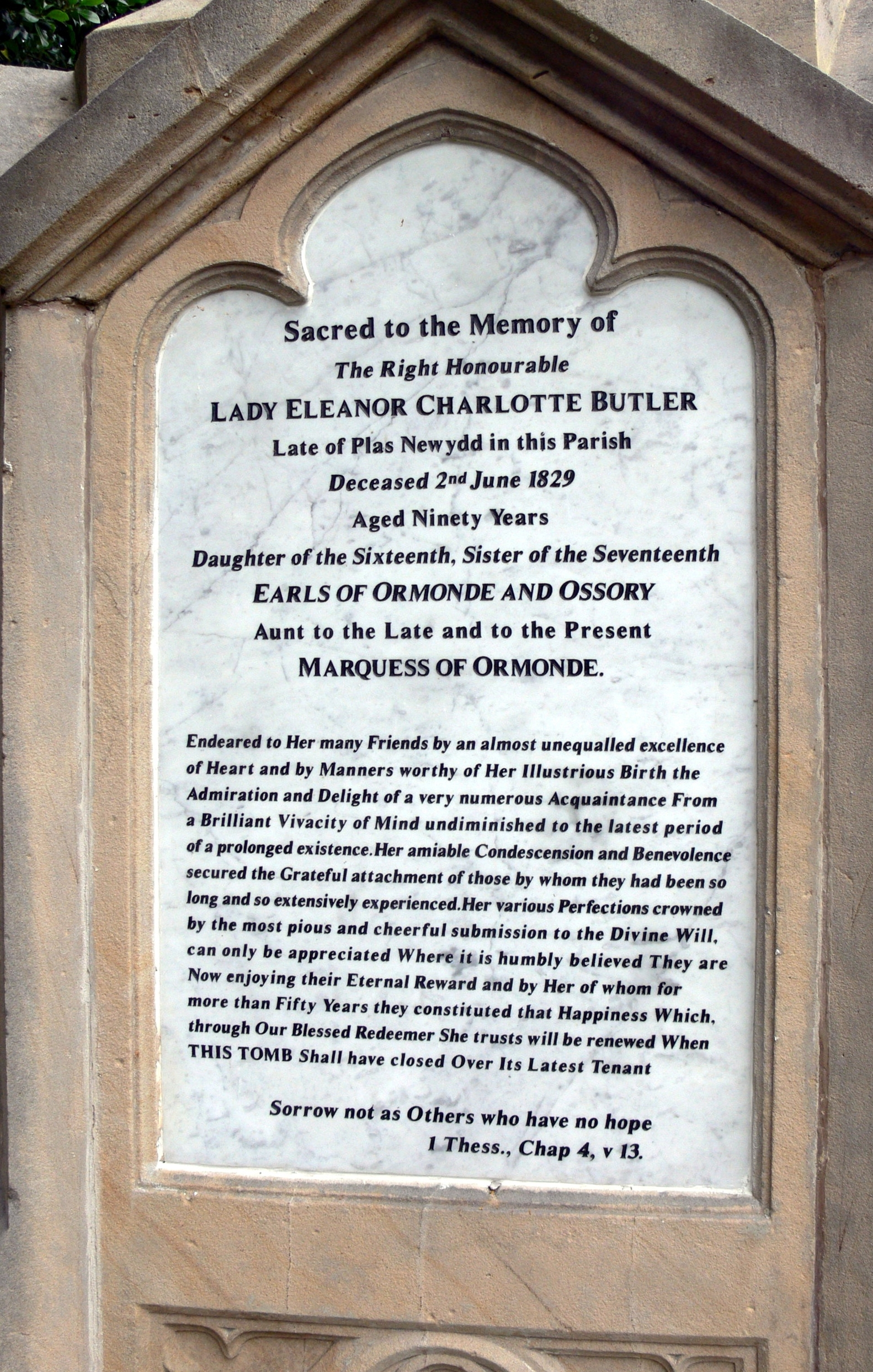
Inscription commemorating Eleanor Butler

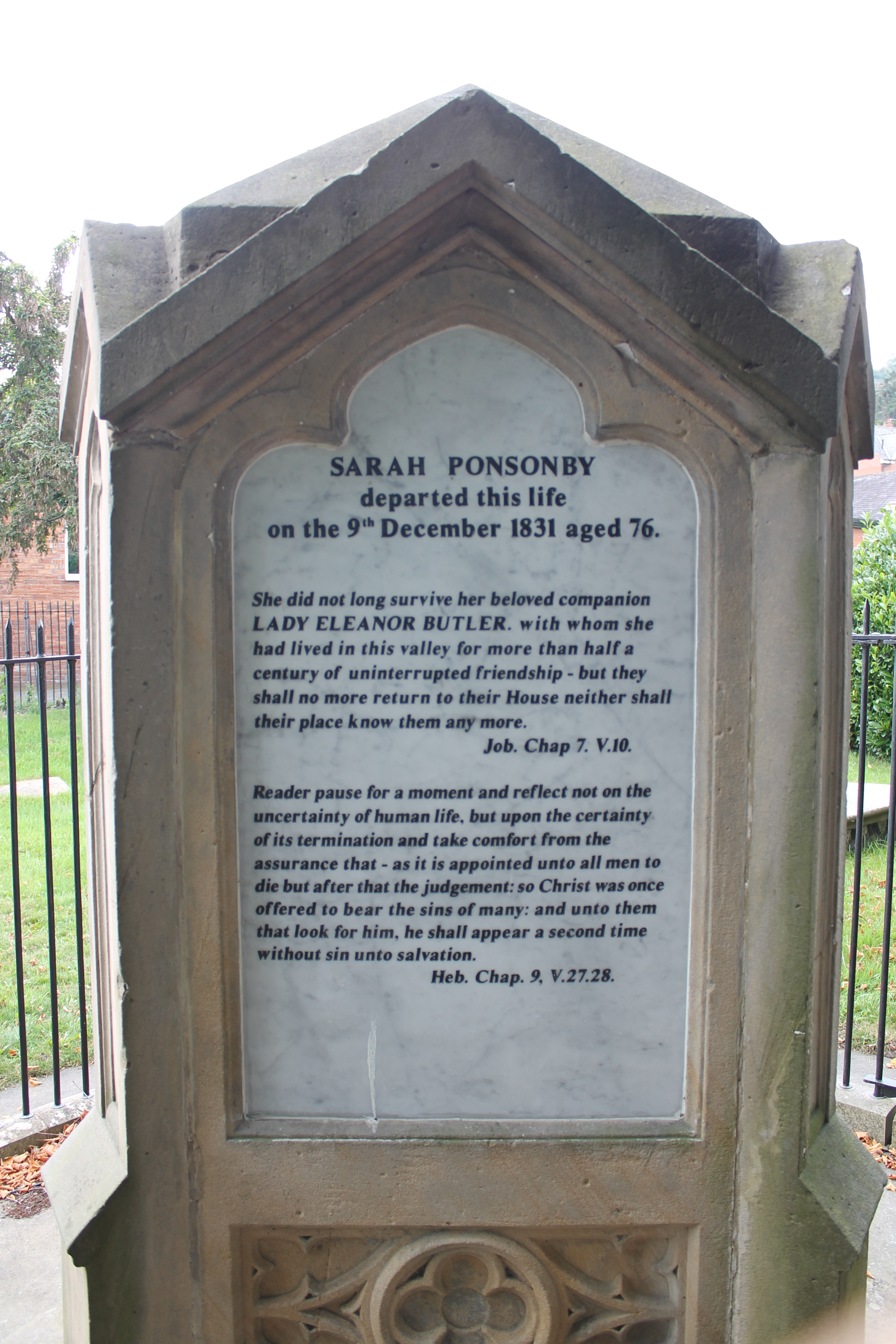
Inscription commemorating Sarah Ponsonby

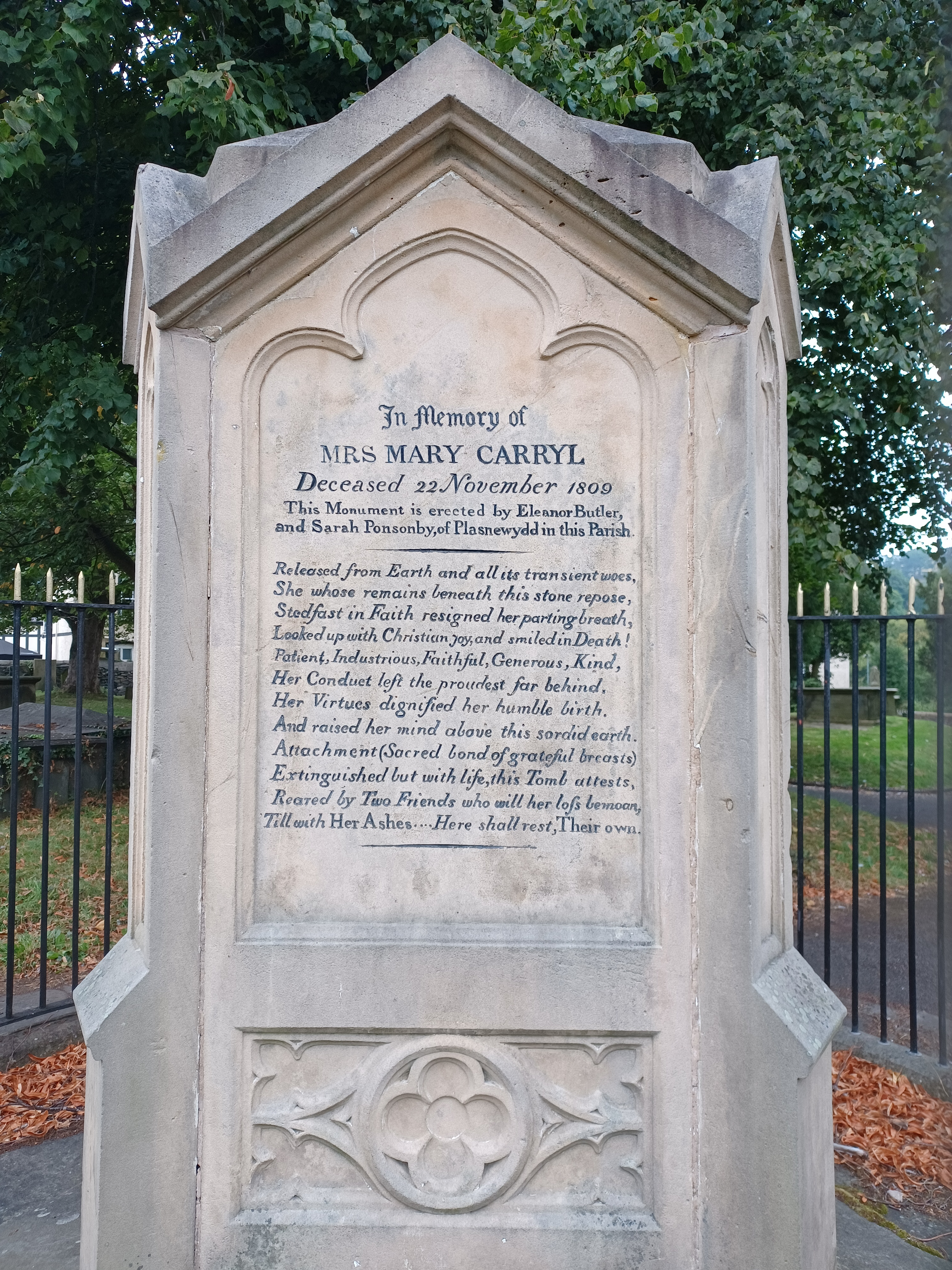
Inscription commemorating Mary Carryl

== Sources ==
- Hubbard, Edward (2003). Clwyd (Denbighshire and Flintshire). The Buildings of Wales. New Haven and London: Yale University Press. ISBN 978-0-300-09627-9. OCLC 315792534.
