= Langolen =

- Commune
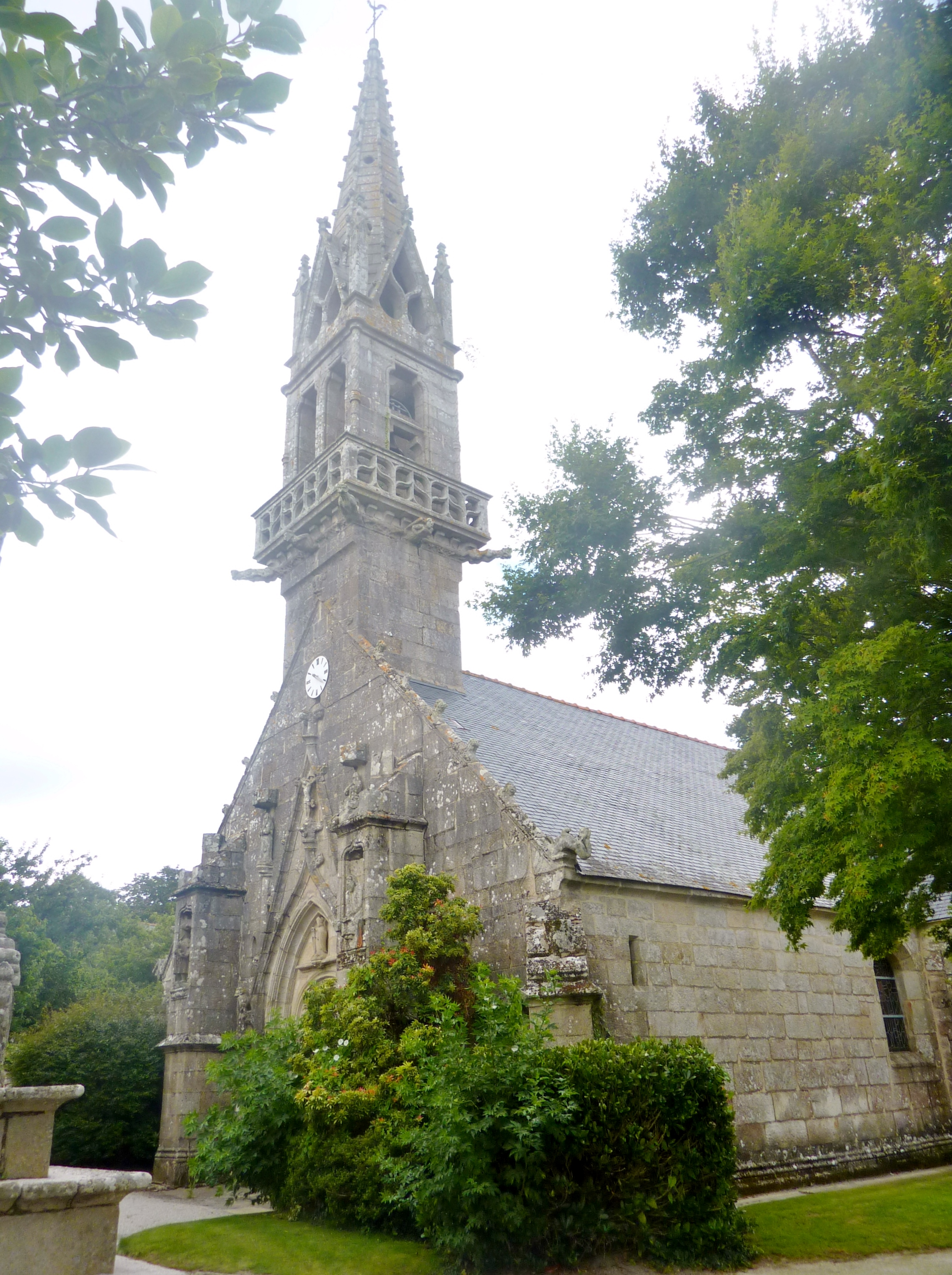
- The parish church of Saint-Gunthiern

- Coat of arms
- Location of Langolen
- Location within France Location within Brittany
- Coordinates: 48°04′04″N 3°54′41″W
- Country: France
- Region: Brittany
- Department: Finistère
- Arrondissement: Quimper
- Canton: Briec
- Intercommunality: Quimper Bretagne Occidentale

Government
  - Mayor (2020–2026): Jean-René Cornic
- Area^{1}: 16.92 km^{2} (6.53 sq mi)
- Highest elevation: 208 m (682 ft)
- Lowest elevation: 70 m (230 ft)
- Population (2023): 836
  - Density: 49.4/km^{2} (128/sq mi)
- Time zone: UTC+01:00 (CET)
  - Summer (DST): UTC+02:00 (CEST)
- INSEE/Postal code: 29110 /29510
- ^{1} French Land Register data, which excludes lakes, ponds, glaciers > 1 km^{2} (0.386 sq mi or 247 acres) and river estuaries.

Langolen (French pronunciation: [lɑ̃ɡɔlɛ̃]; Breton: Langolen) is a commune in the Finistère department of Brittany in north-western France.

The commune takes its name from Saint Collen, a 7th-century monk who is associated with the town of Llangollen in Wales and also with Cornwall.

== Population ==
Inhabitants of Langolen are called in French Langolinois.

== See also ==
- Communes of the Finistère department
