= Llangollen =

Town in Denbighshire, Wales

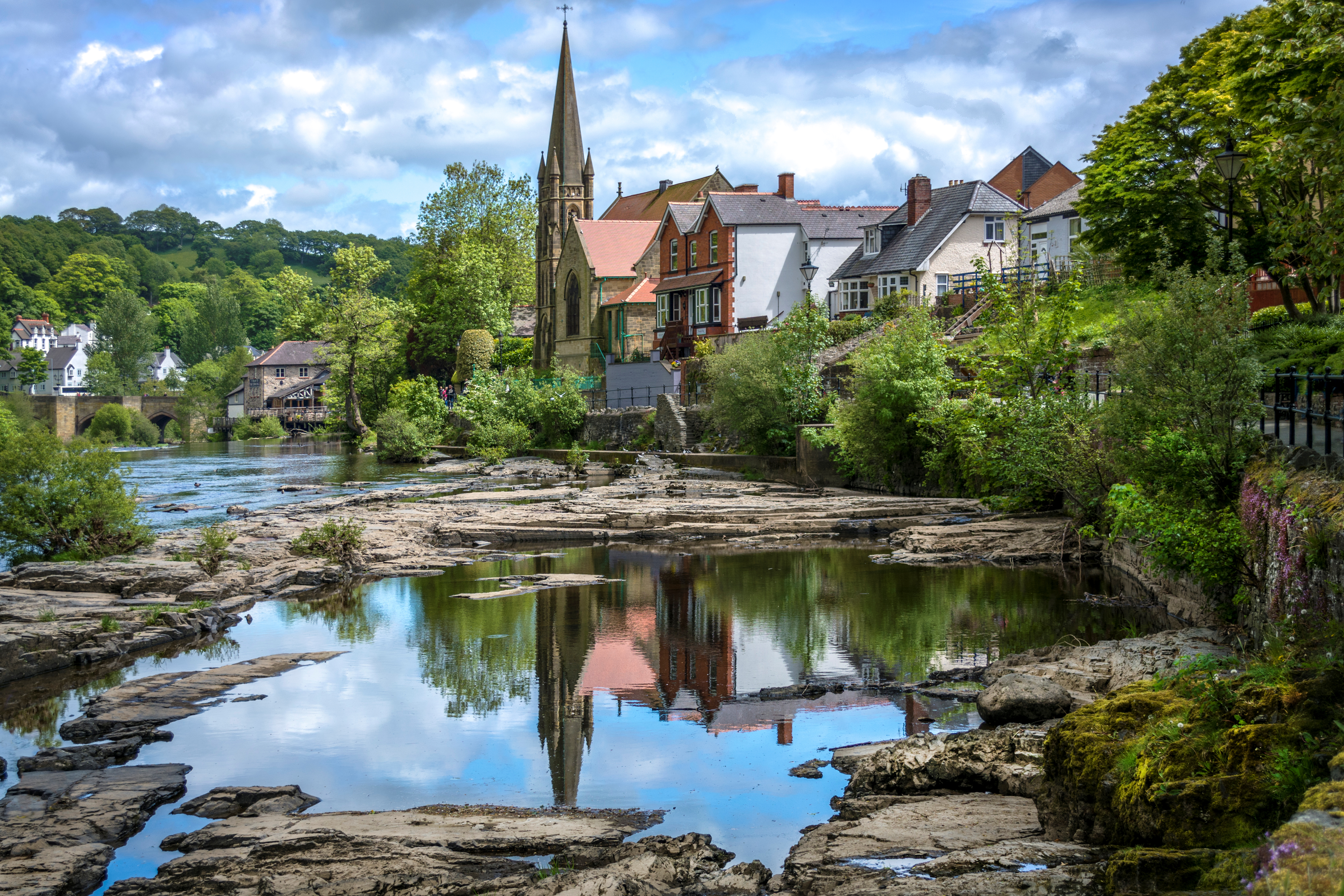
- Llangollen Riverside Walk

- Location within Denbighshire
- Population: 3,603 (Community, 2021)
- OS grid reference: SJ215415
- Community: Llangollen
- Principal area: Denbighshire
- Preserved county: Clwyd
- Country: Wales
- Sovereign state: United Kingdom
- Post town: LLANGOLLEN
- Postcode district: LL20
- Dialling code: 01978
- Police: North Wales
- Fire: North Wales
- Ambulance: Welsh
- UK Parliament: Clwyd East
- Senedd Cymru – Welsh Parliament: Clwyd
- Website: llangollentowncouncil.gov.uk
- List of places UK Wales Denbighshire 52.970°N 3.170°W Map of the community

Llangollen (Welsh: [ɬaŋˈɡɔɬɛn]) is a town and community, on the River Dee, in Denbighshire, Wales. Its riverside location forms the edge of the Berwyn range, and the Dee Valley section of the Clwydian Range and Dee Valley Area of Outstanding Natural Beauty, with the easternmost point of the Dee Valley Way being within the town. At the 2021 census the community had a population of 3,603.

== History ==
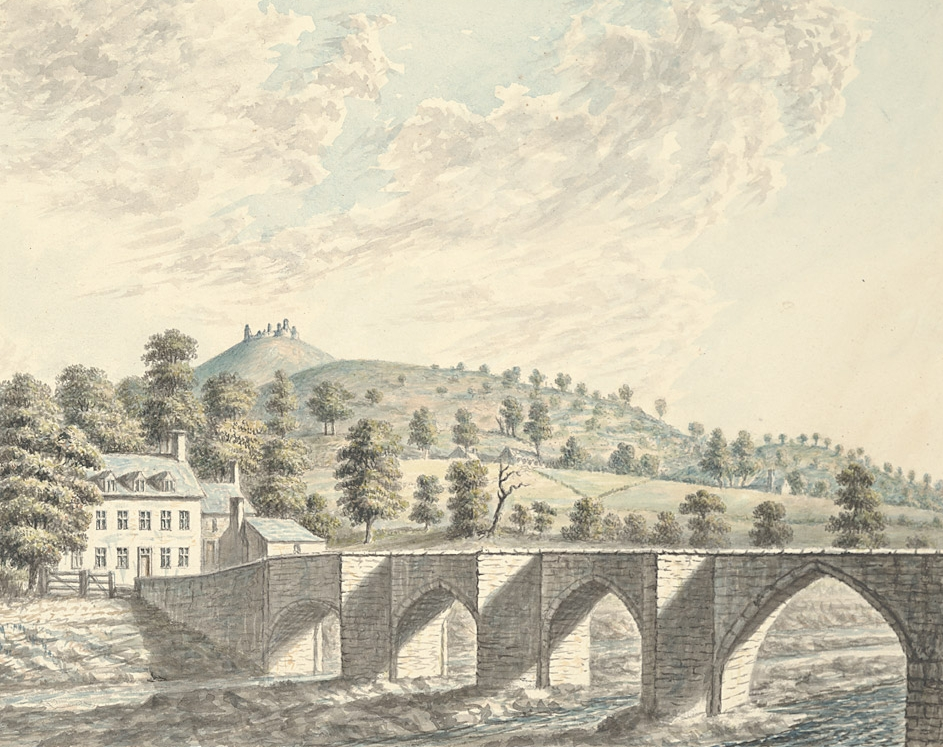
Llangollen Bridge, 1793

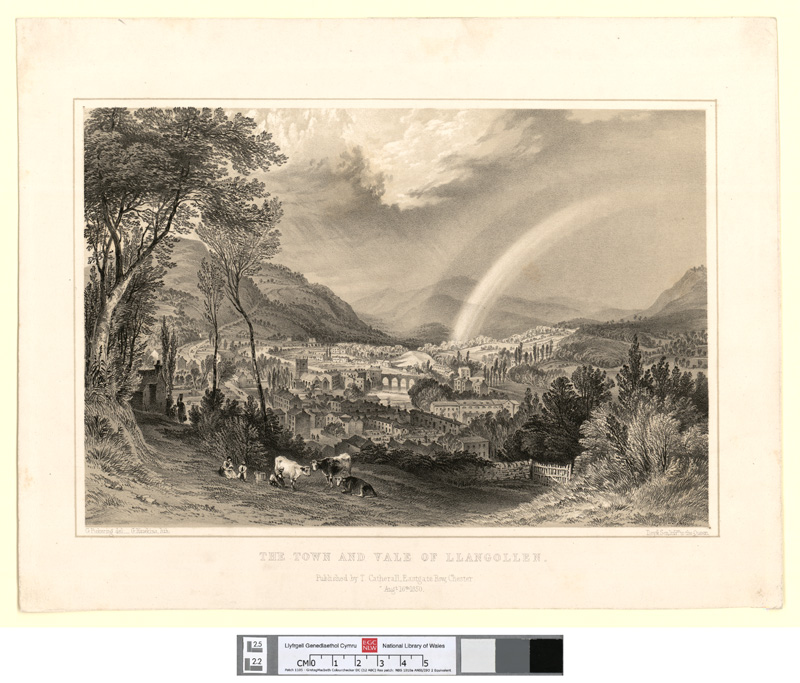
Llangollen in 1850

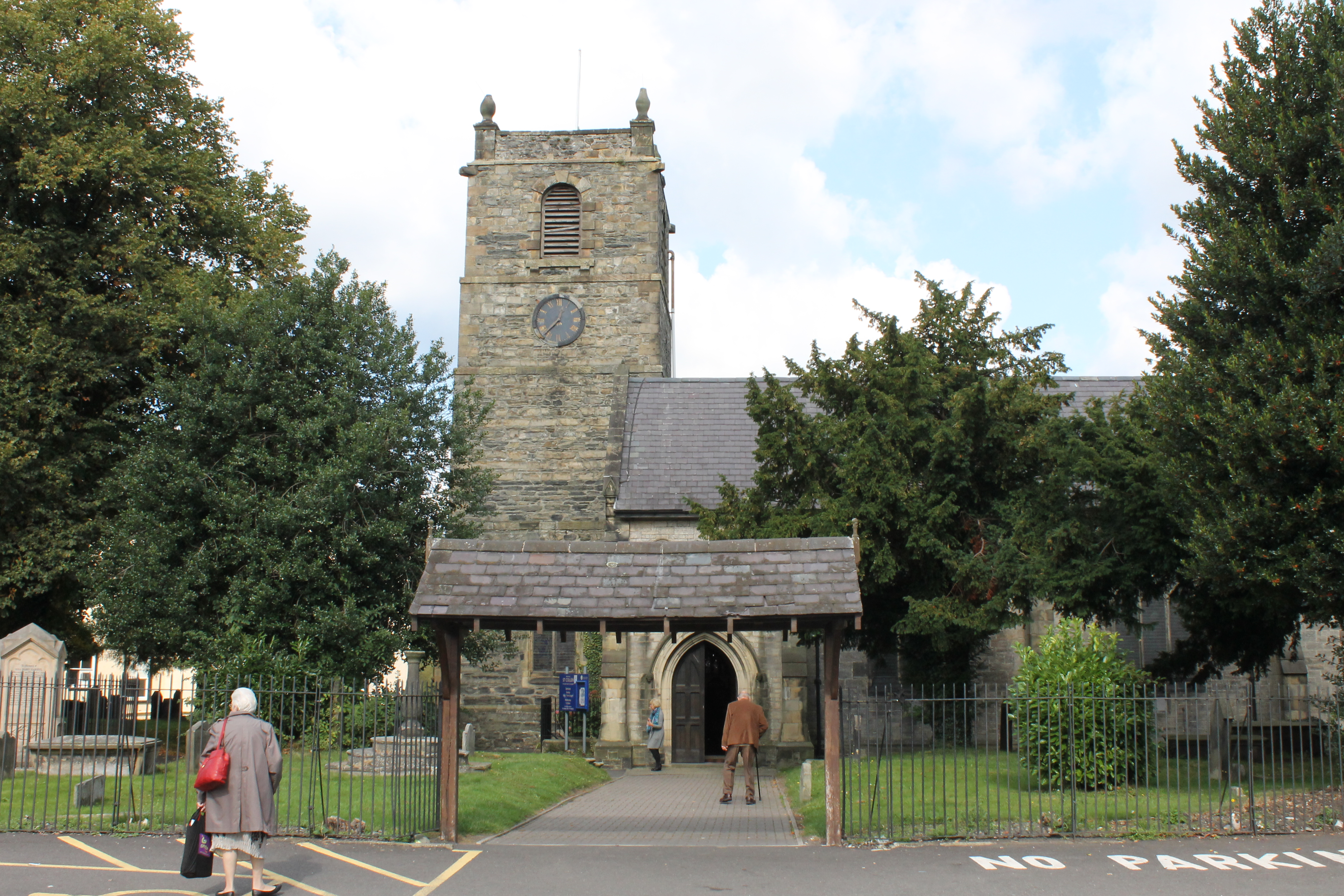
St. Collen's parish church

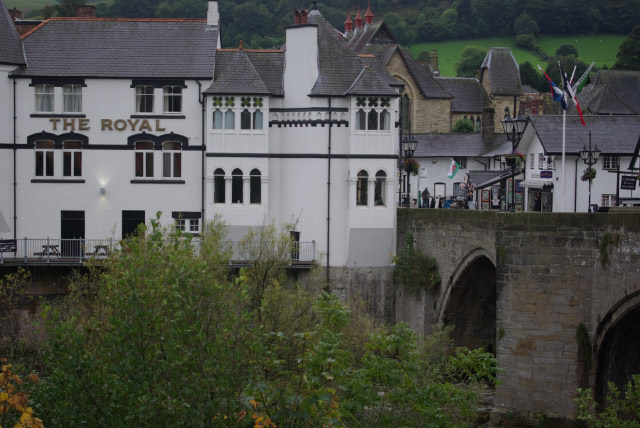
Llangollen Bridge

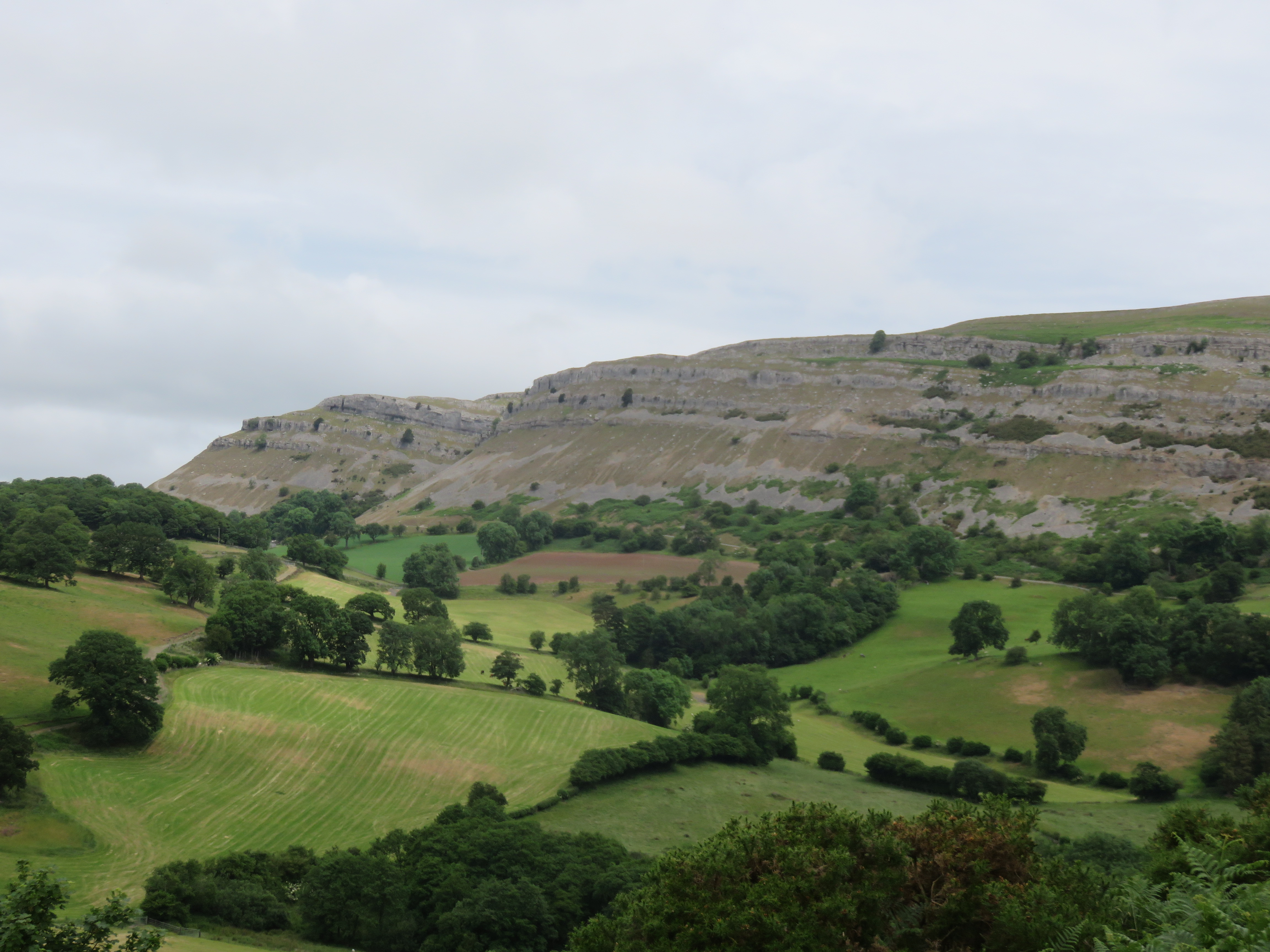
Eglwyseg Mountain

Llangollen takes its name from the Welsh llan meaning "a religious settlement" and Saint Collen, a 7th-century monk who founded a church beside the river. St Collen is said to have arrived in Llangollen by coracle. St Collen’s Church is the only church in Wales dedicated to St Collen, and he may have had connections with Colan in Cornwall and with Langolen in Brittany.

Above the town to the north is Castell Dinas Brân, a stronghold of the Princes of Powys. Beyond the castle is the impressive Lower Carboniferous limestone escarpment known as the Eglwyseg Rocks. The outcrop continues north to World's End in Wrexham. The single track road north of the castle forms the Panorama Walk, and a monument to poet I. D. Hooson from the village of Rhosllannerchrugog is located near its easternmost end (SJ2459 4287).

Valle Crucis Abbey (SJ20441 44168) was established at Llantysilio in about 1201, under the patronage of Madog ap Gruffydd Maelor of Castell Dinas Brân.

The bridge at Llangollen was built across the Dee in the 16th century to replace a previous bridge built in about 1345 by John Trevor, of Trevor Hall (later Bishop of St Asaph), which replaced an even earlier bridge built in the reign of King Henry I. In the 1860s the present bridge was extended by adding an extra arch (to cross the new railway) and a two-storey stone tower with a castellated parapet. This became a café before being demolished in the 1930s to improve traffic flow. The bridge was also widened in 1873 and again in 1968, using masonry which blended in with the older structure. It is a Grade I listed structure and a Scheduled Ancient Monument.

Plas Newydd ('new mansion' or 'new place') high on the outskirts of the town, was from 1780 the home of the Ladies of Llangollen (the Honourable Sarah Ponsonby and Lady Eleanor Butler) and their maid Mary Carryl. They share the same grave memorial in the church.

Elevated on the opposite side of the Dee is Castell Dinas Brân, the ruins of a medieval castle built by the Princes of Powys Fadog.

The Pillar of Eliseg (SJ20267 44528) is another ancient monument located 400m NNW of Valle Crucis Abbey. Llangollen Community Hospital was completed in 1876.

== Governance ==
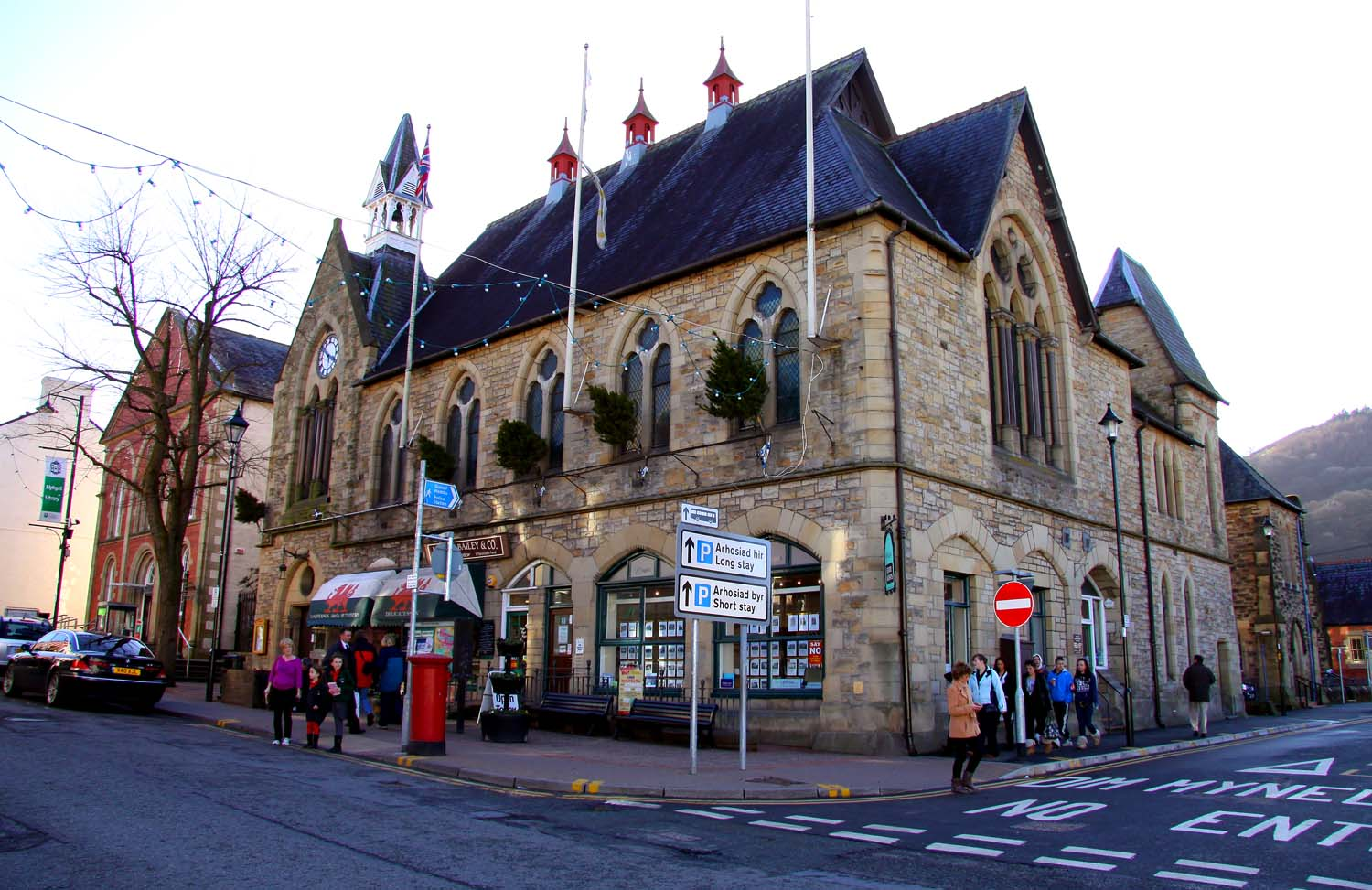
Llangollen Town Hall

There are two tiers of local government covering Llangollen, at community (town) and county level: Llangollen Town Council (Cyngor Tref Llangollen) and Denbighshire County Council (Cyngor Sir Ddinbych). The town council is based at the Town Hall on Parade Street.

=== Administrative history ===
Llangollen was an ancient parish. It formed part of the commote of Nanheudwy within the cantref of Chirkland, which became part of Denbighshire on the county's creation in 1536. The parish was divided into three traeanau ("traean" being the Welsh for 'a third'): Llangollen Traean, Trefor Traean, and Glyn Traean.

- Llangollen Traean contained the townships Bachau, Cysylltau, Llangollen Abad, Llangollen Fawr, Llangollen Fechan, Feifod, Pengwern and Rhisgog.
- Trefor Traean contained the townships Cilmediw, Dinbren, Eglwysegl, Trefor Isaf and Trefor Uchaf.
- Glyn Traean contained the townships Cilcochwyn, Crogeniddon, Crogenwladus, Erwallo, Hafodgynfor, Nantygwryd, Pennant and Talygarth.

In 1857, a local board district was established covering the central part of the parish around the town itself, administered by an elected local board. Llangollen Town Hall was built at the corner of Castle Street and Parade Street in 1867 to serve as the local board's meeting place and a public hall for the town.

Local board districts were reconstituted as urban districts under the Local Government Act 1894, which also directed that civil parishes could no longer straddle district boundaries. The parish of Llangollen was therefore reduced to match the urban district, and the remainder of the old parish was made a separate parish called Llangollen Rural.

Llangollen Urban District was abolished in 1974 under the Local Government Act 1972. The area became part of the new district of Glyndŵr in Clwyd. The area of the pre-1974 urban district became a community called Llangollen, with its community council taking the name Llangollen Town Council. The upper tiers of local government were reorganised again in 1996, when the modern Denbighshire, and its county council were created.

Shortly after the inclusion of Llangollen in Denbighshire, there were discussions whether Llangollen, Llangollen Rural and Llantysilio were to all or partly become part of the neighbouring Wrexham County Borough. Referendums by Llangollen Town Council were held in 1993 and 2000, with the latter resulting in a narrow majority of nineteen votes for staying in Denbighshire, and the Welsh Assembly accepting the result by confirming the boundaries in 2002. Llangollen Rural was the only one transferred in 1997.

== Economy ==
Today Llangollen relies heavily on the tourist industry, but still gains substantial income from farming. Most of the farms in the hills around the town were sheep farms, and the domestic wool industry, both spinning and weaving, was important in the area for centuries. Several factories were later built along the banks of the River Dee, where both wool and cotton were processed. The water mill opposite Llangollen railway station is over 600 years old, and was originally used to grind flour for local farmers.

== Culture ==
In the late 19th century, Llangollen had a weekly newspaper, the Llangollen Advertiser.

Llangollen hosted the National Eisteddfod in 1908. The Gorsedd ceremony was held on the Hermitage Field, next to Plas Newydd, and the circle of stones was later moved into the grounds of the hall. The eisteddfod itself took place on the old Vicarage Field at Fronhyfryd and was visited by David Lloyd George, accompanied by Winston Churchill.

=== Llangollen International Musical Eisteddfod ===
The annual Llangollen International Eisteddfod is a large international music festival. It starts on a Tuesday and ends on the following Sunday. It opens with a parade led by the Llangollen Silver Band, in which both locals and visitors take part in dancing, singing, and playing musical instruments.

=== Llangollen Fringe Festival ===
The Llangollen Fringe Festival is an independent arts festival, usually held in mid July in the town hall. The Fringe includes music, comedy, theatre, dance and workshops. Artists who have taken part in the Llangollen Fringe include Clement Freud, Rhys Ifans, the Damned, Cerys Matthews, Tracey Emin, Damien Hirst, Juan Martín, the Black Seeds, John Cooper Clarke, Will Self, Gang of Four, Lee Scratch Perry, Victoria Coren Mitchell and Gruff Rhys.

=== Dee Rocks ===
Dee Rocks is a local fundraising music festival, usually held during May when the town hall is transformed into a music venue.

=== Songs and nursery rhymes ===
- "Llangollen Market", traditional
- "Ladies of Llangollen", Ian Chesterman
- "Pastai Fawr Llangollen" (The Great Llangollen Pie), Arfon Gwilym
- According to an anonymous rhyme, the bridge over the Dee is one of the Seven Wonders of Wales.
- The nursery rhyme "Mary had a little lamb" is frequently, but incorrectly, linked with Llangollen. Its true origins are in the United States: "This is a lovely folklore story, but sadly Mary Thomas of Llangollen was not the heroine of the nursery rhyme ... The Mary of the rhyme was Mary Sawyer and the school was the Redstone Schoolhouse in Sterling Massachusetts, U.S.A."

== Transport ==
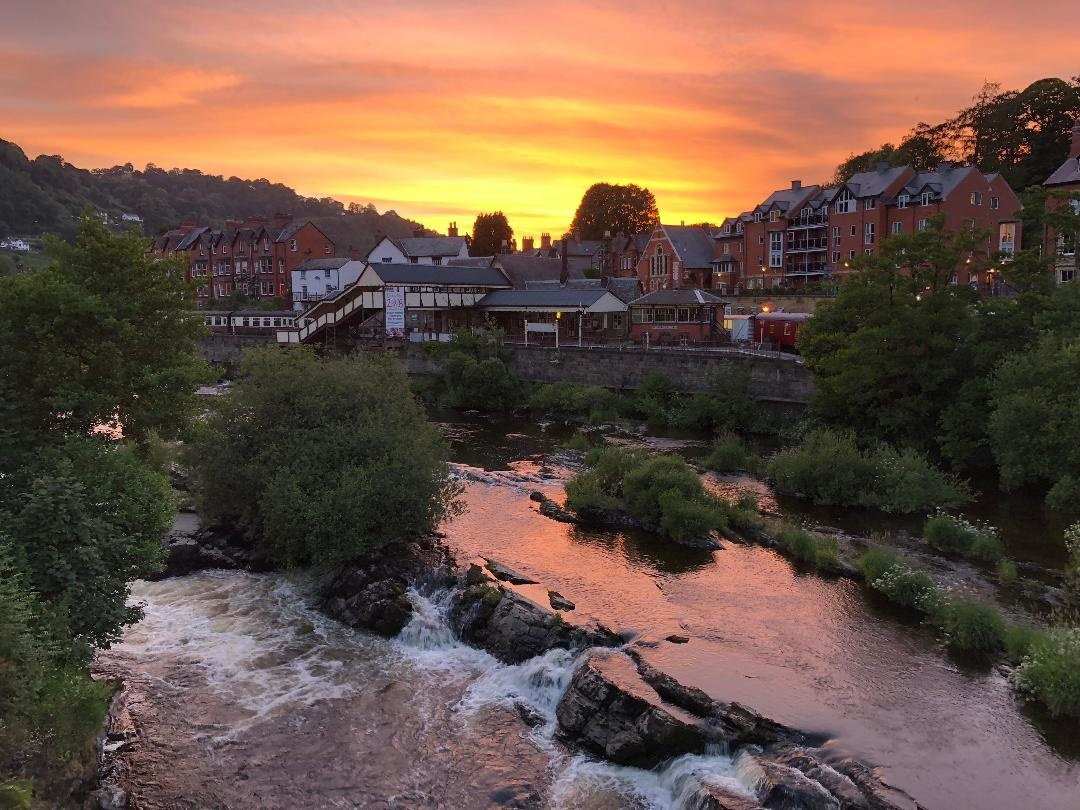
Llangollen Railway Station and the River Dee.

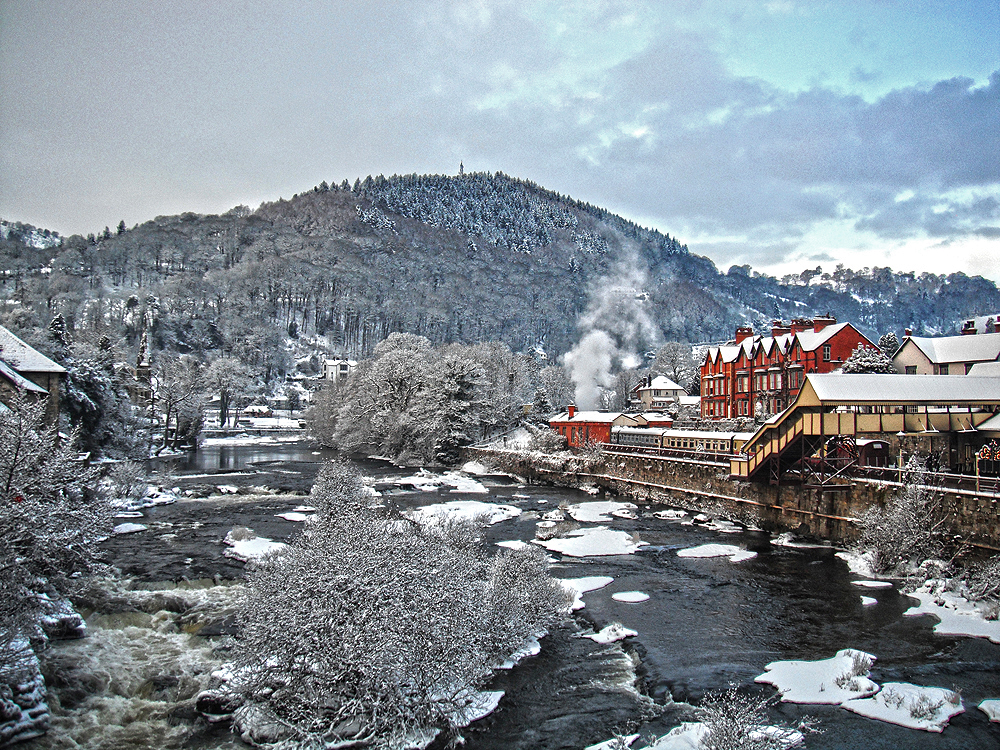
River Dee and Llangollen Railway

Llangollen was an important coaching stop for the mail coach on the old mail route which is now the A5 from London to Holyhead.

=== Buses ===
Various buses serve the town, including buses to Wrexham (Arriva service 5), Barmouth (TrawsCymru service T3) and the Ceiriog Valley. Services 5 and T3 connect Llangollen to Ruabon and Wrexham, which have the closest railway stations on the national network. The Dee Valley Picturesque Bus (service 199) operates between April and November, linking Llangollen and the surrounding villages to popular local attractions including Pontcysyllte Aqueduct, Wenffrwd Nature Reserve, Horseshoe Falls, Valle Crucis Abbey, Plas Newydd house and the Horseshoe Pass.

=== Railways ===
The railway, operating both passenger and goods services, was extended from Ruabon, via Acrefair and Trevor, to reach Llangollen by 1865. The Ruabon to Barmouth Line became part of the Great Western Railway. However under the Beeching Axe of 1964, the line closed to passengers in early 1965, and to freight in April 1969. The line was lifted in May 1969. However, a 10-mile stretch of the line between Llangollen and Corwen has been restored and operates as the Llangollen Railway, a tourist attraction. In 2002, the Rainhill locomotive trials were re-staged on the line.

=== Waterways ===
The Ellesmere Canal was intended to connect the coal mines and ironworks at Ruabon and Wrexham to the canal network and thence to the sea via the River Mersey and the River Severn. The plans were altered, and instead of connecting Trevor northwards to the sea via the River Dee and southwards to the Severn, the canal ran eastwards to join the national network at Hurleston Junction on the Shropshire Union Canal near Nantwich. A feeder canal, navigable to Llangollen, was constructed from Trevor to tap water from the River Dee at Llantysilio (at the weir called "Horseshoe Falls"). After company mergers, the canal became part of the Shropshire Union System. Until recently it was properly called the Llangollen Branch of the Shropshire Union Canal, though it is now known as the Llangollen Canal.

The canal supplied enough Dee water to supply Crewe and Nantwich, and when commercial traffic failed in the 1940s, it was kept open to function as a water supply. Amongst Britain's artificial waterways, the canal has an unusually strong flow of up to 2 miles per hour (3.2 kilometres per hour). Since the use of canals for leisure took off in the 1970s and 1980s, the route, roughly parallel to the river Dee and across the Dee Valley on the Pontcysyllte Aqueduct, is an important part of Llangollen's attraction as a holiday destination. Moorings at Llangollen Wharf and additional moorings in a marina are built at the end of the generally-navigable section, allowing visitors arriving by narrowboat to moor overnight in Llangollen. The canal then extends 1.7 miles (2.7 km), north and then west, to Horseshoe Falls in a section navigable only by a horse-drawn excursion boat.

== Sport ==
Llangollen on the River Dee hosts white water Slalom canoeing and kayaking, being host to International and UK events. The International Canoe Federation (ICF), the European Canoe Association (ECA) and Paddle UK all hold events in Llangollen.

Cricket, football and rugby union teams play at Tower Fields, which overlooks the town and the International Eisteddfod field and pavilion.

Thermals rising up the valley sides to the south of the town are used for paragliding. Mountain bikers enjoy the hills.

Llangollen was the starting point of the first massed-start cycle race held on British roads, on 7 June 1942.

== Notable people ==
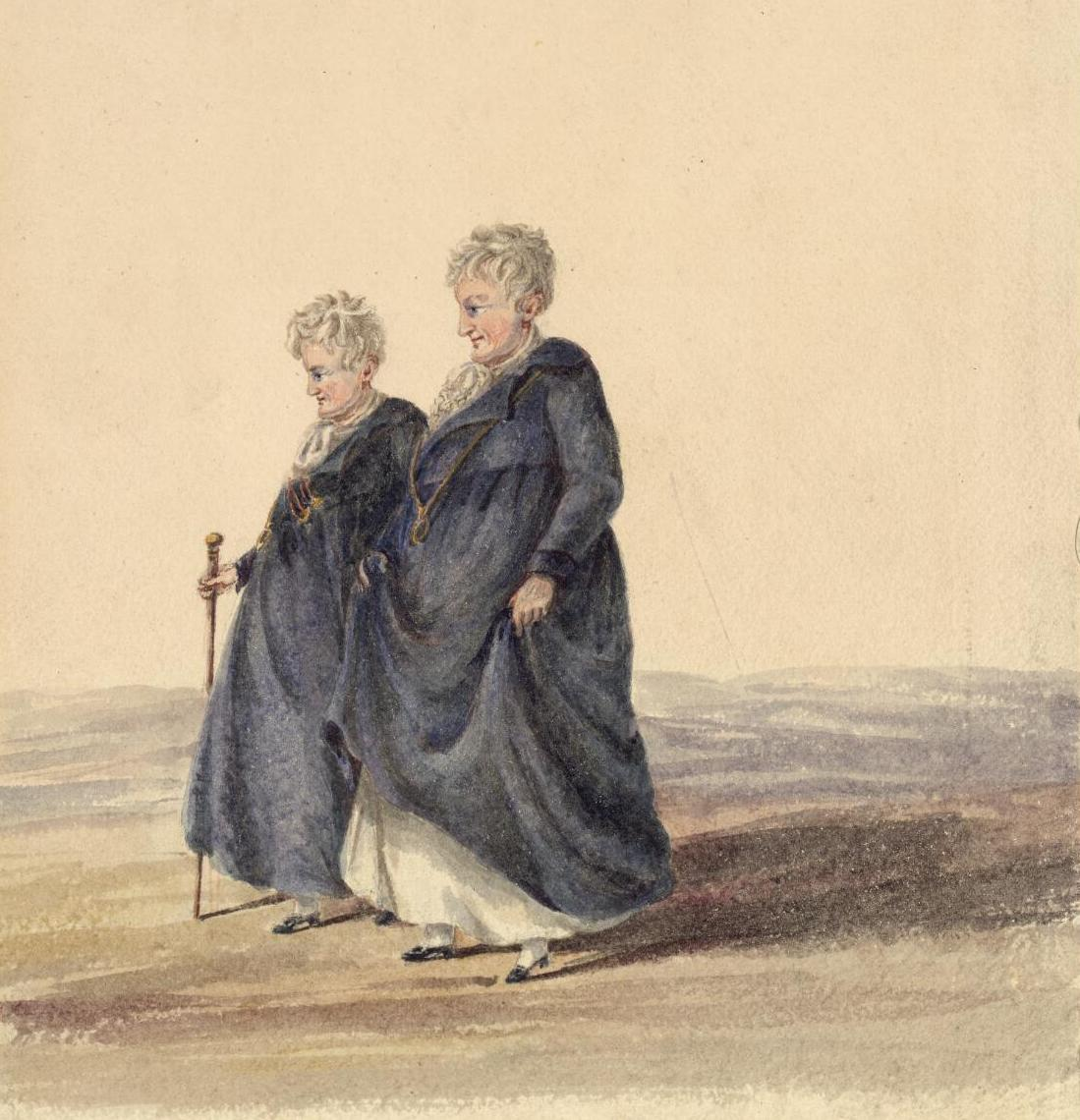
Portrait of Ladies of Llangollen, 1819

- Gruffudd Hiraethog (died 1564), a Welsh-language poet.
- Huw Morus (1622–1709), bardic name Eos Ceiriog ("the nightingale of Ceiriog"), a Welsh poet.
- The Ladies of Llangollen, Eleanor Butler (1739–1829) and Sarah Ponsonby (1755–1831).
- Garner Evans (1910–1963), barrister, RAF officer and politician; MP for Denbigh, 1950–1959.
- Jonathan Rogers (1920–1964), sailor and an Australian recipient of the George Cross.
- Glyn James (born 1941), footballer with 399 caps for Blackpool F.C. and 9 for Wales.
- Stephanie Booth (1946–2016), transsexual business owner and hotelier, starred in Hotel Stephanie for BBC Wales in 2008 and 2009.

== Bibliography ==
- Lawton, Paul. Llangollen Station - A History. Chester: W.H. Evans.
