= Clwydian Range and Dee Valley =

Area of Outstanding Natural Beauty in Wales

Clwydian Range and Dee Valley National Landscape
- Tirwedd Cenedlaethol Bryniau Clwyd a Dyffryn Dyfrdwy (Welsh) Previous names: (2011–2023); Clwydian Range and Dee Valley AONB; AHNE Bryniau Clwyd a Dyffryn Dyfrdwy; (1985–2011); Clwydian Range AONB; AHNE Bryniau Clwyd
- IUCN category V (protected landscape/seascape)

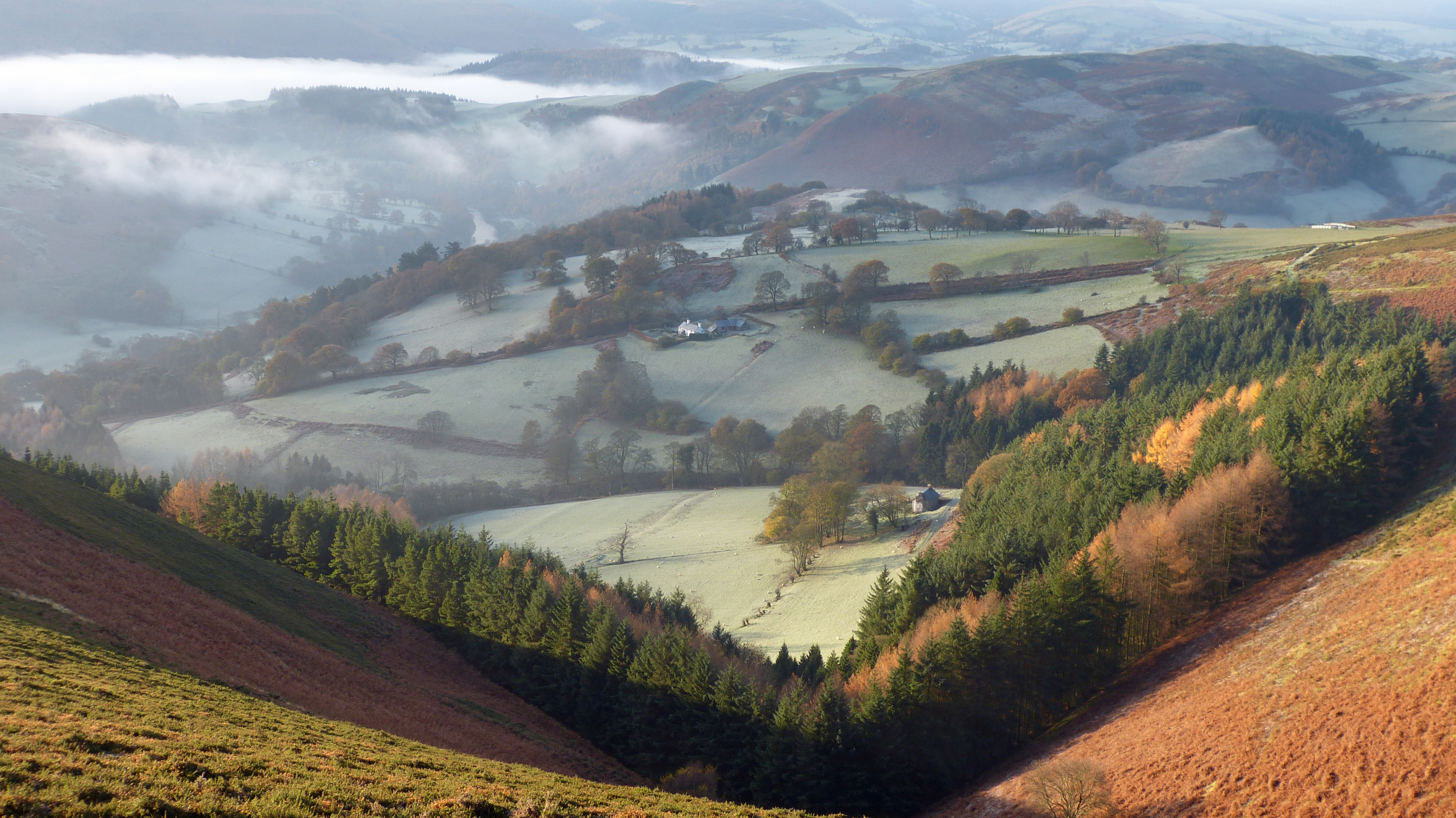
- Near the Dee Valley, on Moel y Gamelin

- Map of the AONB in Wales
- Interactive map of Clwydian Range and Dee Valley National Landscape
- Location: Clwyd, Wales
- Nearest town: Ruthin, St Asaph, Prestatyn, Mold, Chirk
- Coordinates: 53°07′48″N 03°13′30″W
- Area: 389.26 km^{2} (150.29 sq mi)
- Designation: Area of Outstanding Natural Beauty (National Landscape)
- Authorized: 1985 (as Clwydian Range); 2011 (as Clwydian Range and Dee Valley)
- Named for: Clwydian Range and Dee Valley
- Visitors: 1.1 Million (in 2018)
- Governing body: Clwydian Range and Dee Valley AONB Joint Committee (Local councils; Denbighshire, Flintshire, & Wrexham, and AONB Partnership)
- Website: official website

The Clwydian Range and Dee Valley (Welsh: Bryniau Clwyd a Dyffryn Dyfrdwy) is a designated National Landscape (formally an Area of Outstanding Natural Beauty, AONB) located in north-east Wales, covering the Clwydian Range (Welsh: Bryniau Clwyd), and the valley of the River Dee (Welsh: Afon Dyfrdwy).

Designated in 1985 as the Clwydian Range AONB, and expanded to its current extent in 2011, the Area of Outstanding Natural Beauty includes: medieval field systems, open heather moorland, prehistoric hillforts, limestone crags, broad leaved woodland, wooded valleys, and farmland.

The AONB falls within the jurisdiction of the local authorities of Denbighshire, Flintshire, and Wrexham County Borough, with the majority, 80% of the AONB in Denbighshire, and the remaining 20% split evenly between the other two authorities. (Note: 10% each. Before 2011, 60% of the Clwydian Range AONB was in Denbighshire, and the other 40% in Flintshire) The AONB is the largest of only five AONBs in Wales, and one of the 46 in the United Kingdom. Additionally, it is one of only 8 protected areas of Wales. Long-distance footpaths; Offa's Dyke Path, and the Clwydian Way pass through the AONB. The area of the Clwydian Range and Dee Valley AONB is 390 km^{2} (150 sq mi), (Note: This number is rounded from 389.26 km^{2} (150.29 sq mi); multiple sources use the rounded figure, although NRW use a more approximate figure. The former Clwydian Range AONB prior to 2011 covered 158 km^{2} (61 sq mi).) and has been proposed by the Welsh Government to be replaced by a Glyndŵr National Park, which would be Wales' fourth national park.

The AONB is underlain by sedimentary rocks dating from the Ordovician, Silurian, and early Carboniferous periods with Triassic age rocks on lower slopes. The highest peak in the AONB is at Moel Fferna, reaching 630 m (2,070 ft). The mainly Silurian Clwydian Range supports rounded, heather-clad hilltops which provide habitats for scarce flora and fauna and are home to Iron Age hillforts. Several areas have been designated as Sites of Special Scientific Interest and Special Areas of Conservation, with the AONB also home to multiple listed buildings, scheduled monuments, and part of the Pontcysyllte Aqueduct and Canal UNESCO World Heritage Site. In 2018, an estimated 1.1 million people visited six key sites across the AONB, generating approximately £24.1 million for the Welsh economy, according to Natural Resources Wales.

The earliest evidence of human occupation in the AONB is from stone tools dated between 30 and 40,000 years ago in caves near Tremeirchion, with the oldest human-made feature in the AONB being the mound, Gop Cairn. The area is now used for a range of recreational, tourism, and agricultural purposes.

== Geography ==
The Clwydian Range and Dee Valley AONB is commonly regarded as split into two parts referenced within its name, the Clwydian Range, the original section of the AONB as first designated in 1985, and the later designated Dee Valley, across which the AONB status was extended in 2011. The River Dee flows west to east in the southern end of the AONB, rising in Snowdonia to the west, and emptying into the Dee Estuary between the Wirral Peninsula (England), and Flintshire (Wales) outside the AONB. The entire AONB contains various uplands, hillslopes, valleys, lowlands, quarries, and some man-made structures. Using Natural Resources Wales' LMP09 designations the AONB is largely characterised by; uplands (71%), then lowlands (28%), and small amounts of other uses (developed land, inland water features, and amenity land; 0.049%). Upland moors are concentrated near the peaks of the summits of the ranges, such as Moel Famau, Ruabon Mountain and Moel Fferna, with open uplands often surrounding these upland moors, and in particular around Bryn Alyn and Graig Fawr. Wooded uplands are centred in areas such as north of Bodfari up to the A55 road cutting at Rhuallt Hill, Llandegla Forest, from the Horseshoe Pass south to Llangollen, and the Chirk estate surrounding Chirk Castle. Wooded lowlands are present, near the village of Cwm in the north, along the Dee Valley (excluding developed land in the towns of Llangollen and Corwen), and most of the Alyn Valley north of Llandegla. Open lowlands are mainly concentrated in the valleys surrounding the River Alyn south of Llandegla, River Wheeler, and River Morwynion. Developed land is concentrated in quarry sites, the towns of Llangollen and Corwen, and other settlements along the AONB's peripheries. Sections of the range can be seen from as far as Liverpool and Shropshire, whereas from parts of the range, the mountains of Snowdonia, the Irish Sea and the skyline of Liverpool can be seen.

The AONB is additionally known for its lack of light pollution and home to "cherished" dark skies for dark-sky gazing for astronomers, enthusiasts and casual observers. In addition, 60% of the flora and fauna in the AONB are nocturnally active; with light pollution having a negative impact on local wildlife and their behaviour. There are local initiatives in place to protect the AONB's skies and potentially gain "Dark Sky" status to become Wales' third dark sky reserve by the International Dark Sky Association. In May 2022, the AONB started operating a van to act as a "mobile observatory" to promote the Dark Skies initiative.

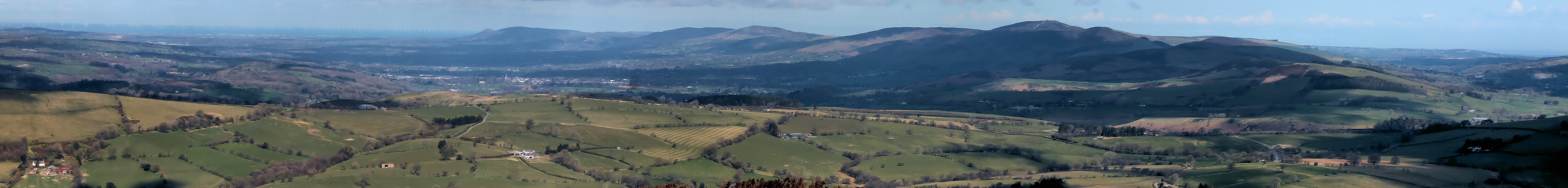
Panorama of the Clwydian Range from Moel Morfydd

=== Clwydian Range section ===
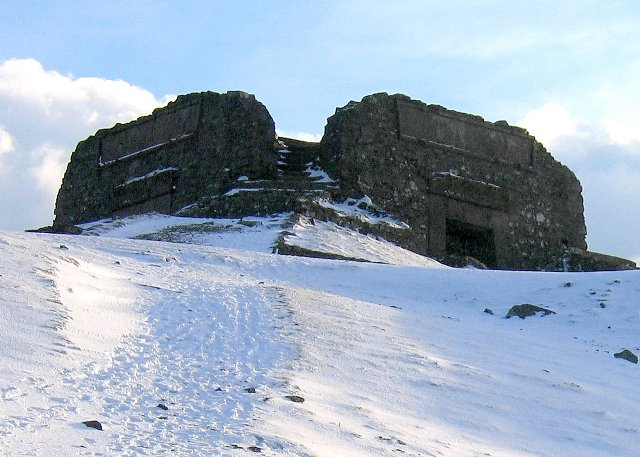
Jubilee Tower on Moel Famau

The Clwydian Range forms the northern and oldest designated part of the AONB, designated in 1985. The broad upland range of rounded, heather-clad open hills runs from Nant y Garth in its south (bordering the Dee Valley section), and up to the carboniferous limestone hillside on outskirts of Prestatyn to the north. The range forms a ridge separating the foothills of the Dee Estuary and the Cheshire Plain from the east, with the Vale of Clwyd to the west. The range is covered in moorland, limestone outcrops, and hillforts. Distinctive landmarks of the range include; the Jubilee Tower on the summit of Moel Famau, Penycloddiau hillfort, and the Moel y Parc radio transmission mast. Sections of the range are cut into by valleys of the range's two main rivers; the River Alyn, which flows north through the range, and the Wheeler. Limestone outcrops are present in the Prestatyn Hillside, Llanferres, and Loggerheads Country Park. The widest definition of the Clwydian Range was not included in the original designation, with some ranges of the Clwydian Range later included in the Dee Valley extension. The range is situated between the mainly Permo-Triassic Vale of Clwyd and the Vale of Clwyd fault line to the west, and the Lower Carboniferous rock of the Alyn Valley and Cheshire Plain, and the Alyn Valley fault line to the east.

=== Dee Valley section ===
The Dee Valley (Welsh: Dyffryn Dyfrdwy) follows the River Dee in the south of the AONB and is home to the oldest rocks in north-east Wales, dating to the Ordovician era. Regarded to be part of the AONB since 2011, it comprises the areas south of the then Clwydian Range AONB including various hilly ranges sometimes regarded to be the southernmost hills of the Clwydian Range. The valley contains various natural and human features and the Nant y Garth pass forms a border between it and the Clwydian Range AONB section. Distinct limestone formations such as hills, walls, and buildings are present at Graianrhyd and Llandegla to the north of the valley, with its Neolithic limestone cave sites protected as the Graig Site of Special Scientific Interest. The valley of Afon Morwynion marks the westernmost edge of the area, the river begins north of Llandegla Forest and flows south-west to meet the River Dee at Carrog. The Morwynion Valley is characterised by its long, wide formation, with gentle slopes of rich valley pasture bounded with hedgerows and man-made stonewalls, and contains Caer Drewyn, a prehistoric fort.

River Dee at Carrog

The easternmost parts of the Dee Valley are characterised by its pastoral and farming landscape, where the Carboniferous age millstone grits and the rolling hills of the late Carboniferous coal measures of Ruabon Mountain starts sloping downwards to give way to the Cheshire Plain, and the plains around the city of Wrexham with settlements such as Pen-y-cae and Garth.

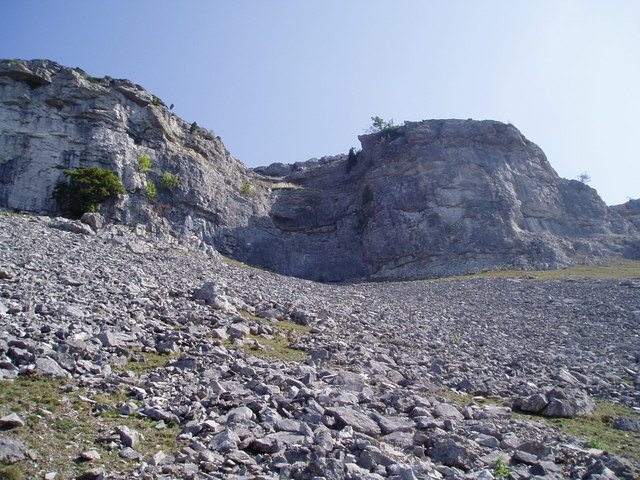
The Eglwyseg Rocks.near Pentredwr

The southern part of this area is the Vale of Llangollen, characterised by steep valley sides, meanders of the Dee, and fossil terraces. Near Pentrefelin, the River Eglwyseg flows into the Dee. Upstream from the confluence, the Eglwyseg Valley is home to the Eglwyseg Rocks, a Carboniferous Limestone crag overhanging at a height of 445 m (1,460 ft), described as one of the most impressive scree slopes in Britain, and the head of the valley is known as World's End. Offa's Dyke Path, and the Panorama Drive pass along the bottom of these rocks. The River Dee has been designated as a Special Area of Conservation due to its role as a habitat for Atlantic salmon and floating water plantain, and the area of the river in Wales, including the sections within the AONB, form the Afon Dyfrdwy (River Dee) Site of Special Scientific Interest (SSSI). The south-eastern section of the AONB extends to Chirk, covering the Pontcysyllte Aqueduct and Canal (designated as a UNESCO World Heritage Site in 2009), and Chirk Castle. Sections of the Berwyn Range are within the AONB, namely the northern edges which slope down to the River Dee. The AONB boundary stops at the Dee Valley skyline on the range, to avoid the designation from continuing south on the range and into Powys. The Berwyn Mountains SSSI, SAC and European Special Protection Area is located to the south of the AONB.

The River Dee enters the AONB slightly west of the town of Corwen in Edeirnion. It then passes Caer Drewyn, Carrog, Glyndyfrdwy, and Llantysilio, with the Llangollen Railway following the river on its route between Llangollen and Corwen. At Berwyn the river passes over the manmade Horseshoe Falls, before flowing down a slight slope next to the Chain Bridge Hotel and flowing under its historic pedestrian bridge, first built in 1814, and rebuilt in its current form following flooding in 1929. The Dee then flows through the town of Llangollen and under the 16th-century Llangollen Bridge. The bridge is a Grade I listed bridge, a Scheduled Ancient Monument and considered one of the Seven Wonders of Wales. Further east, the Dee passes karstic limestone exposures of the Eglwyseg Rocks (Welsh: Creigiau Eglwyseg). With Castell Dinas Brân (meaning: Castle of Dinas Brân) overlooking the Dee at a nearby hilltop. The river then enters the County Borough of Wrexham, passing south of Trevor, under the Llangollen Canal at Pontcysyllte Aqueduct, then under the Cefn Mawr Viaduct, carrying the Shrewsbury to Chester railway line across the Dee and the A483 Dee Viaduct.

==== Llantysilio and Maesyrchen Mountains ====
Separated by the Vale of Alyn, a second sister range, sometimes regarded (at least partly) as part of the Clwydian Range and included in the AONB since 2011, the Llantysilio and Maesyrchen Mountains, or South Clwyd Mountains extend further south to Acrefair and Gwyddelwern. Alongside the (core–northern) Clwydian Range it also forms a ridge between the Cheshire Plain and Wales' interior but separates the plain from the Vale of Llangollen instead. Llantysilio Mountain, part of a large moorland, rises over 500m to the western sections of the Dee Valley. With its dry heaths covering an area designated to be part of the Berwyn and South Clwyd Mountains European Special Area of Conservation (SAC). The mountain is separated from Cyrn-y-Brain by the Horseshoe Pass, a mountain pass where the A542 road passes through from Llandegla to Llangollen. Moel y Gaer, an Iron Age hillfort is present at the summit of Llantysilio Mountain. Expansive moorlands cover the lower altitude sections of the southern ranges, including Cyrn-y-Brain Mountain, Llandegla Forest and Ruabon Mountain as well as the eastern peripheries of the Llandegla Moors, Esclusham Mountain and Minera Mountain. Most of this moorland is also part of the Berwyn and South Clwyd Mountains SAC. Notable natural features include: Chwarel Pant Glas, a site of importance for the study of structural geology, Aber Sychnant's limestone pavements, and the Minera cave system. The range is host to numerous large limestone and slate quarries, present in the east and south areas of the range respectively, highlighting the area's significant mining heritage. The AONB borders the North Wales Coalfield, home to former coal mining activities during the Industrial Revolution. It is also home to the Penbedw estate, a historical hall and garden, near Nannerch.

The Llantysilio mountains are bounded by the Bala Lineament to the north, and the Dee Valley fault line to the south.

=== Highest summits ===
The range of hills in the north-east of Wales is regarded to have three distinct areas of spurs; the Clwydian Range (Moel Famau, Moel Llys y Coed, and Moel Arthur), Llantysilio Mountain (Moel y Gamelin, Moel Morfydd, Moel y Faen, and Moel y Gaer), and Maesyrchen Mountain (Ruabon Mountain, Cyrn y Brain, Esclusham Mountain, and Eglwyseg Mountain). Some peaks of the Berwyn Range are within the AONB, such as Moel Fferna, peaking at 630 m (2,070 ft), making it the highest peak in the AONB. Moel y Gamelin is the highest summit in the Llantysilio and Maesyrchen mountains, peaking at 577 m (1,893 ft). With Moel Famau being the highest summit in (the core part of) the Clwydian Range, peaking at 554 m (1,818 ft).

Highest summit in each of the three areas of spurs
Summit	Elevation	Location	Grid reference	Note
Moel Fferna	630 m (2,070 ft)	Berwyn Range	SJ1159739829	Highest in the entire AONB, the summit and north-facing slope is part of the AONB, south-facing slope is not.
Moel y Gamelin	577 m (1,893 ft)	Llantysilio and Maesyrchen mountains (Note: or "South Clwyd(ian) Mountains".)	SJ1754946550	Highest in Llantysilio and Maesyrchen mountains
Moel Famau	554 m (1,818 ft)	Clwydian Range	SJ1602762698	Highest in the Clwydian Range; and the most visited summit.

== Geology ==
The oldest rocks in the area are present near Cyrn y Brain (extending towards Esclusham Mountain and Minera Mountain), at a small inlier near Mynydd Cricor and Nant y Garth Pass, and an inlier near the town of Corwen, all three inliers form a syncline known as the Llangollen syncline (the first two form the northern limb, the latter forms the southern limb), dating to the Ashgill Epoch of the Ordovician Period. These sedimentary rocks are composed of deep-sea (sea-floor) mudstone and siltstone, with subsidiary sandstone and limestone bands. The rocks are additionally layered with volcanic ash, likely from periodic volcanic eruptions originating in modern-day Snowdonia and the Berwyn range. There were two large faults active in the region during this period; the Pontesford-Linley and Church Stretton faults. These rocks formed in a deep marine environment, with fossils such as; crinoids, brachiopods, trilobites and graptolites found in the rocks.

During the Silurian Period, the mudstones, siltstones and sandstones that now make up the central spine of the Clwydian Range and Llantysilio Mountains were deposited in a deep sea basin known as the Welsh Basin, and situated in the southern hemisphere at 30°S. These eventually became the slates present in the modern-day Horseshoe Pass and the Berwyn range, with a fold of these rocks visible at the A55 rock cutting near Rhuallt. There is minor mineralisation of the rocks near Rhuallt, where the Pennant Mine extracted minerals such as galena, zinc, baryte and barium ore, commonly associated with the mineralisation of lead and zinc. The mine was designated as a SSSI in 2010.

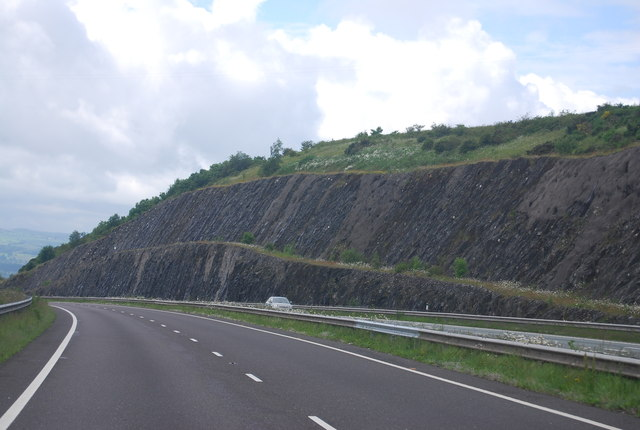
A55 passing through the Rock cut-through on Rhuallt Hill

In the Early Carboniferous Period, the area was initially land with rivers, leading to the formation of red, purple and green mudstones and river beds of pebbles and fossils. The area was later submerged in a shallow tropical sea, forming the limestone deposits in modern-day Eglwyseg, Eryrys, Graig Fawr, Moel Hiraddug, Prestatyn Hillside, Loggerheads, and Bryn Alyn. Like in the Ordovician, the rock from this period was also layered in volcanic ash, although from volcanoes likely in the modern-day Derbyshire area. This ash smothered the marine life present in the shallow sea, which was home to organisms such as; brachiopods, corals, crinoids, fish, goniatites, and trilobites. As the period progressed, the waters receded and vast river deltas deposited mud and sand along the coasts; these deposits are present as the Ruabon Marl, Cefn y Fedw, Holywell Shale, and the Gwespyr Sandstone formations of the Millstone Grit Group in Gwespyr, Moel Garegog, Graianrhyd, Moel Findeg and Ruabon Mountain. In the Late Carboniferous Period, swamplands, and vast forests were present at the coastal river deltas of the Wales-Brabant High, forming the coal deposits present in the northern Vale of Clwyd, and the North Wales coast stretching from Prestatyn to the Point of Ayr, and parts of the Dee Estuary (the Denbighshire and Flintshire coalfields).

During the Permian and Triassic periods, Wales was about 20° north of the equator, the equivalent latitude of North Africa today, and at this latitude, the red desert sandstones of the Vale of Clwyd and the western side of the Clwydian Range were deposited, as the area underwent desertification.

The final episode of significant modification of the landscape took place in the Quaternary Period as thick ice sheets covered the area from time to time, smoothing its hills and gouging cwms and valleys, such as the Dee Valley west of Llangollen, a classic U-shaped glacial valley. Upon the retreat of the glaciers around 14,000 years ago, they left behind erratic boulders, sands, gravels and clays which form hummocky terrain in areas such as the valley of the River Wheeler. The valleys of the Alyn, Clwyd and Wheeler are thought to have started forming while underneath the ice sheet through erosion and deposition, which became the modern valleys upon the glaciers' retreat.

== Climate ==
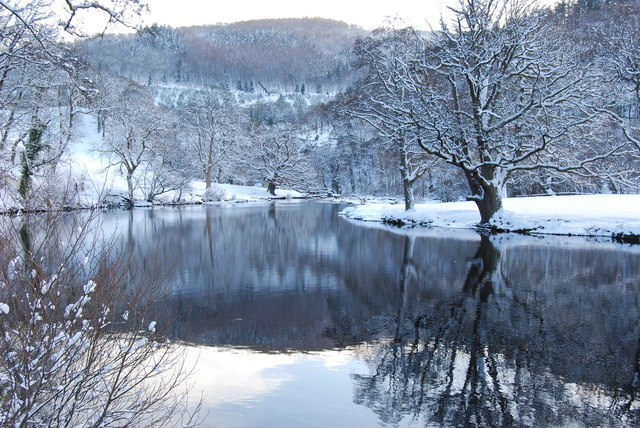
River Dee towards the Horseshoe Falls, in winter.

Along with the rest of Wales, the Clwydian Range and Dee Valley have a maritime climate, in the north temperate zone, with the predominant winds being the westerlies blowing in from the Atlantic Ocean. This means that the weather in Wales is generally mild, cloudy, wet and windy. The country's wide geographic variations cause localised differences in amounts of sunshine, rainfall and temperature. The Clwydian Range shelters areas east of the AONB in the Cheshire Plain providing less harsh weather and rainfall for areas near Deeside, Chester and Wrexham. Throughout Wales, the winter months are significantly wetter than the summer ones. Snow is comparatively rare near sea level in Wales, but much more frequent over the hills of the range, and the uplands experience harsher conditions in winter than the more low-lying parts. Using data between 1981 and 2010, provided by a nearby Met Office weather station, located in Hawarden Airport, Flintshire, in the plains to the east of the range and not on the coast. The mean temperature is approximately 17 °C (63 °F) and shows a seasonal and a diurnal variation. January and February are the coldest months with a mean minimum temperature of 1.4 °C (34.5 °F). July is the warmest month, with a mean maximum temperature around 21 °C (70 °F).

Climate data for Hawarden Airport 10m, 1981–2010
Month	Jan	Feb	Mar	Apr	May	Jun	Jul	Aug	Sep	Oct	Nov	Dec	Year
Mean daily maximum °C (°F)	7.9 (46.2)	8.2 (46.8)	10.7 (51.3)	13.1 (55.6)	16.5 (61.7)	19.1 (66.4)	21 (70)	20.5 (68.9)	18.1 (64.6)	14.4 (57.9)	10.6 (51.1)	8 (46)	14 (57)
Mean daily minimum °C (°F)	1.4 (34.5)	1.4 (34.5)	3.2 (37.8)	4.2 (39.6)	6.8 (44.2)	10.2 (50.4)	11.9 (53.4)	11.7 (53.1)	9.6 (49.3)	6.9 (44.4)	4 (39)	1.7 (35.1)	6.1 (43.0)
Average precipitation mm (inches)	60 (2.4)	44 (1.7)	50.7 (2.00)	49.5 (1.95)	57.2 (2.25)	59.2 (2.33)	56.5 (2.22)	57 (2.2)	60 (2.4)	81.3 (3.20)	75.5 (2.97)	75.5 (2.97)	726.2 (28.59)

== Ecology ==
=== Flora ===
The limestone grasslands of the AONB support habitats for flora such as cowslip (Primula veris), rockrose (Cistaceae), autumn gentian (Gentianella amarella) and orchids (Orchidaceae). Invasive species such as Himalayan balsam and Japanese knotweed have been documented to be present beside rivers in the AONB, with the latter recorded to be more widespread around the River Dee.

=== Fauna ===
The flora of the AONB supports various invertebrates such as butterflies (common blue butterfly (Polyommatus icarus)) and moths (such as the red-spotted burnet moth of the Zygaenidae family). The heaths of the AONB support birds such as the European stonechat, black grouse, red grouse, tree pipit, hen harrier and merlin, which migrate to the moorlands in the spring and summer for their breeding period. The broadleaved woodlands of the AONB are home to dormice, and the rivers Dee and Alyn provide a suitable habitat for freshwater pearl mussels, Atlantic salmon, and otters. Water voles have been recorded as present in the Llangollen Canal, at either end of the Wheeler valley, and a single pocket recorded in the Alyn valley. American mink, an invasive species in Great Britain, has been recorded in all three river systems.

==== Big cat sightings ====
Sightings of the British big cats, theorised to potentially be a puma or panther-like non-native feline, have been reported in the AONB and across North Wales, since the 1970s (likely in response to the Dangerous Wild Animals Act 1976, which banned big cats as pets, leading to their subsequent release into the wild). The Clwydian Range in particular is believed to be a suitable habitat for the animals, although some sightings have been reported from the Dee Valley, in Corwen and near Pontcysyllte Aqueduct.

== Archaeology ==
Excavations in the AONB have uncovered remains of animals such as the bear, lion, mammoth, spotted hyena, wolf, and woolly rhino. The presence of these remains reflects the great climatic oscillations that occurred during the last Ice Age in the area.

Between 2004 and 2010, the "Heather and Hillforts" lottery-funded project took place in the Clwydian Range AONB. The project involved a topographical survey of the Penycloddiau hillfort performed by the Clwyd-Powys Archaeological Trust (CPAT), and a geophysical survey conducted by Engineering Archaeology Services (EAS). The latter survey revealed roundhouses at the site and a potential enclosure.

In March 2014, remains of a firepit dating to the Bronze Age was discovered near Moel Arthur. Radiocarbon dating of the charcoal present in the firepit dates them to 4,000 to 4,500 years old and were used in the early Bronze Age. Burnt stones were also present in the firepit, and the overall purpose of the site still remaining unknown.

Between 2012 and culminating in an exhibition in 2018 at Loggerheads Country Park, the Clwydian Range Archaeology Group (CRAG) established in 2011, surveyed and excavated the area surrounding Moel Arthur for a number of years. Their excavations revealed signs of human activity from various periods, ranging from medieval to as far back as Mesolithic times. Of the items excavated, stone tools dating up to 9,000 years ago were discovered in the excavation area. For their work, CRAG won the Marsh Award for Community Archaeology from the Council for British Archaeology (CBA) and the Marsh Christian Trust.

== History ==
Neanderthal remains dating to around 230,000 years ago were found in Pontnewydd cave at Cefn Meiriadog near St Asaph. The remains found were predominantly teeth from at least five individuals. Alongside the remains, hand-axes were also found indicated other later encounters of Neanderthals and/or humans with the cave.

The earliest evidence of human settlement in the modern-day AONB exists at Tremeirchion, in the Ffynnon Beuno Caves, where the discovery of stone tools dated to between 30 and 40,000 years ago, was made. Other caves along the Clwydian Range reveal various finds from various times, of animals once inhabiting the area, including the mammal bones of spotted hyenas, mammoths, and lynxes. The oldest human-made feature of the AONB is Gop Cairn, an artificial mound near Trelawnyd, which is the largest in Wales, and second largest in Great Britain after Silbury Hill in Wiltshire.

Ritual and burial monuments from the Bronze Age are present in significant quantity in the AONB, prominently placed on summits in the area. The earliest settlements in the AONB are the 10 Iron Age hill forts constructed around 2,500 years ago, leading to the formation of a chain of these Celtic tribal structures across the ranges, such as Caer Drewyn, Moel Arthur, Moel y Gaer (Llanbedr), Moel y Gaer (Llantysilio), Moel Fenlli, and Penycloddiau. Although in 2017, Bronze Age stone tools were uncovered in the area between Moel Arthur and Penycloddiau dating to 2000 BC, and are thought to be some of the oldest found in the range, older than the establishment of the range's Iron Age hillforts. Radiocarbon analysis of the area is said to have revealed potential Neolithic or Mesolithic activity in the area.

Castell Dinas Brân was built in 1260 by Gruffydd ap Madog, Prince of Powys Fadog, and Chirk Castle was built in 1295, in honour of Roger Mortimer and his role in overcoming Llywelyn ap Gruffudd in 1282. Owain Glyndŵr, Prince of Wales, is from the area, namely near Glyndyfrydwy where his remains at his Motte can still be seen.

During the late medieval period, the first open field systems of the area were lost to enclosed fields influenced by the newly present landed gentry, who contributed to the creation of historic designated parklands in the area, such as those at Penbedw.

During the Industrial Revolution, mining for lead and coal, and the production of iron was increasingly present in the areas east of the AONB near the city of Wrexham and the slopes towards it. Slopes overlooking the settlements of Brymbo, Coedpoeth, Minera, and Pen y Cae, became central to the developing mining and metal producing industry.

Construction of Pontcysyllte Aqueduct began in 1875, and was designed by Thomas Telford.

=== Conservation ===
John Dower's 1945 report on the "National Parks in England and Wales" included the Clwydian Range for consideration when National Parks in England and Wales were to be selected. This report alongside the subsequent Hobhouse Report by Sir Arthur Hobhouse would contribute to the National Parks and Access to the Countryside Act 1949 which created the British National Park system.

A natural conservation area covering 310 km^{2} (120 sq mi) of the Clwydian Range and extending southward to the Dee Valley was first proposed in the England and Wales Report of the National Parks Committee, commonly shortened to the Hobhouse Report, which was published in July 1947 by the Ministry of Town and Country Planning. The area was proposed to become a Conservation Area, alongside 51 others, for its "outstanding landscape beauty" and home to "great scientific interest", which was deemed worthy of protection and management through statutory designation. Conservations Areas eventually became "Areas of Outstanding Natural Beauty", however this particular area as eventually designated was much smaller than originally proposed, only covering most of the Clwydian Range.

==== AONB designation ====
Map showing the original extent of the AONB in 1985 (dark green) and the Dee Valley extension in 2011 (light green), in Wales (pale yellow)

The Clwydian Range was designated as an Area of Outstanding Natural Beauty in 1985 by the Secretary of State for Wales Nicholas Edwards MP, under the National Parks and Access to Countryside Act 1949, covering 158 km^{2} (61 sq mi) until its extension. Its southern boundary was set to be much more northern than originally proposed in 1947. Reasons for this decision remain unclear, although it has been said that it was chosen to mark the border between the Clwydian Range and the uplands sometimes regarded to be part of the Berwyn Range. This was due to local opposition to designations for the Berwyn Range, such as the then proposed Site of Special Scientific Interest (SSSI), proposed during the AONBs consultation period. This potentially influenced the decision to exclude the Berwyn Range, and therefore the Dee Valley, from becoming part of the AONB in 1985.

In 2005, a Pathfinder partnership was set up by the three local authorities of Denbighshire, Flintshire, and Wrexham, with the Countryside Council for Wales (CCW) to consider whether an AONB extension into the Dee Valley would be beneficial.

==== Dee Valley expansion ====
The Countryside Council for Wales expressed its proposal to extend the Clwydian Range AONB to incorporate sections of the Dee Valley to recognise the area's "outstanding natural beauty". Under the Countryside and Rights of Way Act 2000, which modified the National Parks and Access to Countryside Act 1949, the CCW was awarded powers to designate any area in Wales that was not already a national park, as an AONB.

The CCW's plan would add rural Denbighshire communities, in the southern parts of the Clwydian Range and the Vale of Llangollen, and Wrexham communities of Esclusham and Ruabon. The CCW hosted a four-month consultation in October 2010, and following its end on 31 January 2011, it received 314 responses mainly over concerns of new regulations imposed on landowners. The CCW replied in its proposal document that "AONB designation does not interfere with land management practices and designation does not bring about new restrictions on agricultural activities". The proposal was supported by Wrexham County Borough Council, as it would extend the AONB by 10 miles west-to-east bringing it into the boundaries of Wrexham County Borough. The council stated that the extension would bring huge benefits to the area, protecting the local landscape, improve the securing of money for environmental projects, and encouraging tourism to the area, in addition to complementing the then-recent designation of Pontcysyllte Aqueduct as a World Heritage Site in 2009.

The CCW met in early February 2011 and agreed to move to the next phase of the process of expanding the AONB to the Dee Valley, which is to produce a draft designation order, formally outlining the CCW's proposals. For five weeks afterwards, the draft order would be open to external views, until it is sent to the Welsh Assembly Government. It would then be the responsibility of the Welsh Assembly Government Minister for the Environment Jane Davidson to make the final decision on the proposal as early as March 2011. At the meeting, the CCW also considered a further proposal of extending the AONB even further to residents of the Ceiriog Valley and Berwyn. The CCW stated that the proposed extended area is of "outstanding quality, nationally and internationally important for their natural beauty and equally worthy of protection as an AONB". The plan met opposition from local farmers who opposed the added restrictions the status would bring, whereas local tourist attractions welcomed the proposal, hoping it would promote and encourage tourism, in addition to making new developments in the area take into account its effects on, and be sympathetic to, the local countryside.

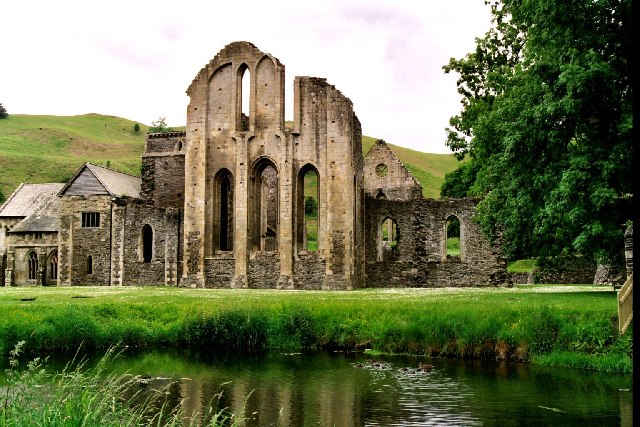
Cistercian ruins of Valle Crucis Abbey on its eastern side, in Llantysilio, Denbighshire

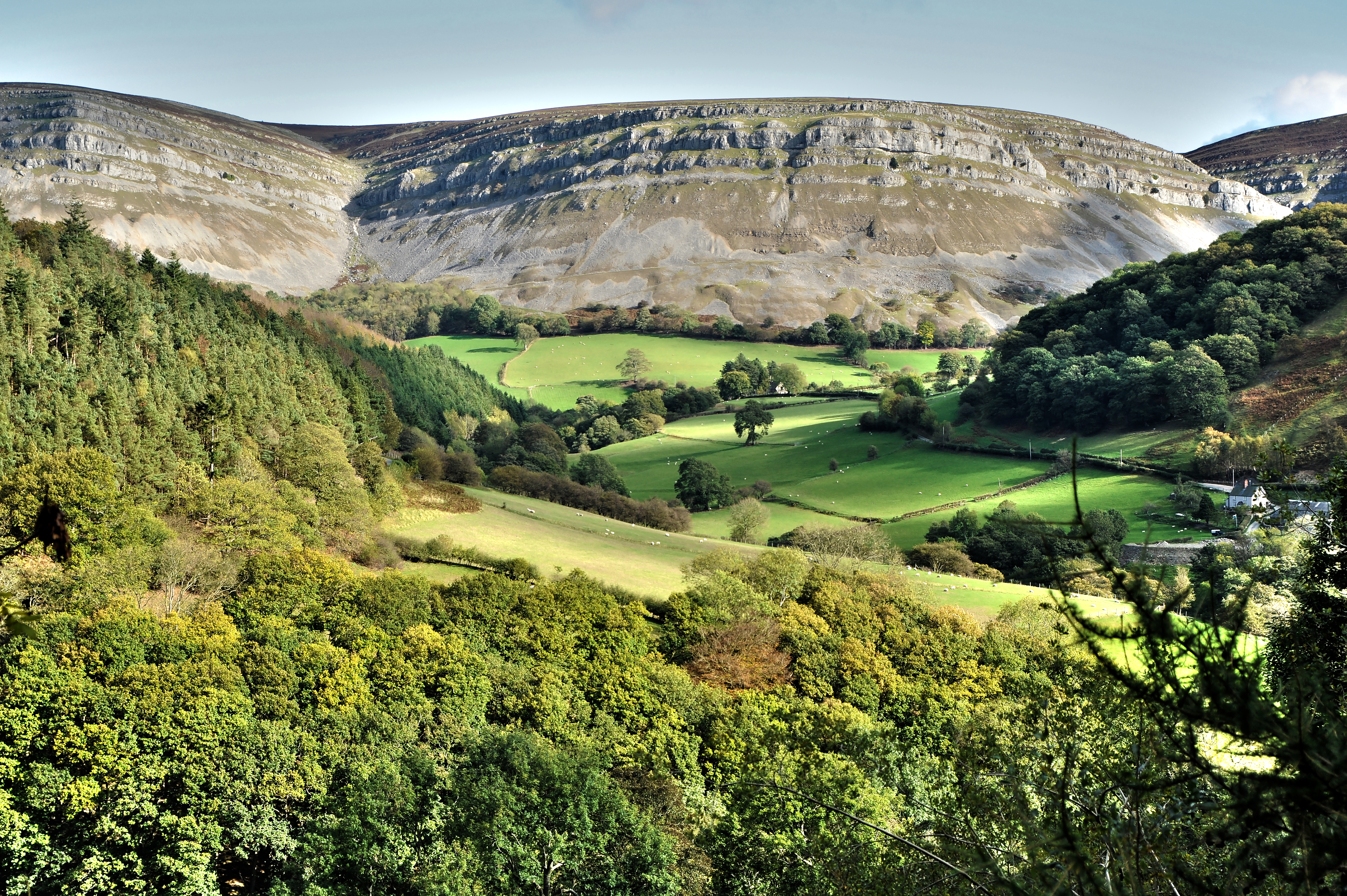
Eglwyseg Valley

On 22 November 2011, Welsh Government Minister for Environment and Sustainable Development John Griffiths AM (who succeeded Jane Davidson), confirmed that the AONB's area was to be extended southwards to include the Dee Valley, increasing the size of the AONB by 229 km^{2} (88 sq mi). The newly added Dee Valley area, includes Eglwyseg escarpment, Moel y Gamelin, Esclusham Mountain, the Horseshoe Pass and Castell Dinas Brân, the towns of Llangollen and Corwen, the Pontcysyllte Aqueduct and Canal World Heritage Site, Chirk Castle, and Valle Crucis Abbey. The Ceiriog Valley was not added to the AONB, due to the valley's physical relationship with the Berwyn mountain range which crosses the local authority border into Powys, where an extension of the AONB is not supported. An artificial cut off point of the AONB at the Wrexham—Powys border was deemed illogical, so the southernmost boundary of the AONB was defined as the skyline of the Dee Valley (the southern summits of the highest peaks in the valley) instead.

==== Proposed national park ====
The campaign to make the then Clwydian Range AONB, a national park began in 2010, on the 25th anniversary of AONB status. Conservative AM for Clwyd West, Darren Millar called for National Park status, describing the area as a "national treasure" needing extra recognition for its unique biodiversity and archaeology, which would boost the local economy. On 16 February 2011, in an Assembly debate, Jane Davidson AM, then Environment, Sustainability and Housing Minister for Wales, dismissed the proposal, stating that if it were to follow through, it would have to be applied to all other AONBs in Wales and that the area already benefits from tourism support. Criticism to the proposal followed at the time, touted as "out of touch" with the wishes of the rural community, potentially limiting rural business opportunities and taking power away from local authorities.

AONBs and National Parks (dark green) in Wales. The CRDV is located to the north-east of the country, shaded in a lighter green.

In their manifesto for the 2021 Senedd election, Welsh Labour and First Minister of Wales Mark Drakeford, pledged for the establishment of a new national park in Wales. If followed through, the newly designated Glyndŵr National Park would become Wales' fourth national park and the newest one since 1957. Upon their re-election, the new administration stated that they were in the process of fulfilling the pledge, although no dates were given at the time, however, they stated that announcements would be made in "due course", and that the redesignation is a "multi-year" project.

In June 2023, the Welsh Government commissioned Natural Resources Wales to investigate a potential designation of the area into a national park, involving data and evidence gathering and meeting with local communities, with a decision expected by 2026. While the proposed national park is centred on the AONB, the boundaries of the national park may not be the same as the current AONB, with the exact boundaries being under discussion.

Black version of the logo used until 2023, while it was branded as an Area of Outstanding Natural Beauty

On 22 November 2023, it was announced all AONBs in England and Wales would be renamed to "National Landscapes". The Welsh Government had also considered the name on a separate occasion in 2015 to rename the Welsh AONBs.

== Management ==
The AONB is managed by a Joint Committee. Formed in 2014, through a joint agreement by the three local authority councils of Denbighshire County Council, Flintshire County Council, and Wrexham County Borough Council, it is made up of lead members from the three authorities, each of which holds the power to act on behalf of the local authorities they represent. Denbighshire County Council is the leading council on the Joint Committee. The committee is supported by an Officers Working Group, which consists of officers from the three local authorities. In addition to the officers, the Joint Committee is supported by Natural Resources Wales (NRW), and the AONB partnership including 25 groups and organisations such as: the Welsh Government, Cadw, Cadwyn Clwyd, Glandŵr Cymru - the Canal & River Trust in Wales, the National Trust, North Wales Wildlife Trust, and Public Health Wales. The partnership also includes other key stakeholders, such as community councils, statutory agencies, landowners, farmers, and members representing conservation and recreation interests and groups.

Under the Countryside and Rights of Way Act 2000, local authorities are responsible for developing an AONB management plan. This plan is constructed in consultation with the advisory committees such as the AONB partnership, which reports and advises the joint committee in the development and completion of the AONB Management Plan. The management plan sets out the policies the local authorities want to enact for the management of the AONB and how these policies would be implemented and achieved, providing a framework of permitted activities in the AONB. The management plan is required to take into consideration various issues of the AONB and not be limited to only environmental priorities, but also to analyse and address social and economic issues in the AONB. The 2000 act mandates that management plans have to be revised no less than every five years, with Natural Resources Wales (formed from a merger including the Countryside Council for Wales in 2013) providing funding for AONB management to the local authorities, allocated based on the AONB's management plan's policies. Joint committees are required to notify NRW when they are intending to publish their management plan. The same act places a duty on public bodies; including private utility companies to respect efforts made to conserve, protect, and enhance the AONBs natural beauty.

The AONB designation shares the same status in terms of planning with national parks, however, unlike national parks, AONBs do not have their own planning authorities. Instead, the powers are exercised by the relevant unitary authorities on behalf of the AONB. These powers would likely be transferred to a newly designated national park planning authority if the proposals to redesignate the Clwydian Range and Dee Valley AONB into a national park are followed through.

=== Other designations ===
There are 22 Sites of Special Scientific Interest (SSSIs) in the AONB, accounting for 9,097.34 ha (90.9734 km^{2}) or 23.36% of the Clwydian Range and Dee Valley AONB's area. There are 3 Special Areas of Conservation (SACs) accounting for 8,028.37 ha (80.2837 km^{2}) or 20.62% of the AONB's area. One Special Protection Area covering the Berwyn range is partly within the AONB boundaries, covering 2,555 ha (25.55 km^{2}) or 6.56% of the AONB. 162 Wildlife Sites are in the AONB, covering a combined 3,451.92 ha (34.5192 km^{2}) or 8.87% of the area, one local nature reserve (LNR) covering 21.33 ha (213,300 m^{2}) at Moel Findeg, and 73 regionally important geological sites (RIGS) covering 676.45 ha (6.7645 km^{2}), 1.74% of the AONB.

Twelve of the SSSIs involve geological features, with the four limestone cave systems in the AONB protected with the SSSI designation:

- Alyn Gorge caves, within the Alyn Valley Woods and Alyn Gorge Caves SSSI
- Cae Gwyn and Ffynnon Beuno caves, within the Ffynnon Beuno and Cae Gwyn Caves SSSI
- Tremeirchion Caves, within the Ffynnon Beuno and Cae Gwyn Caves SSSI
- Minera Caves, such as Ogof Dydd Byraf and Ogof Llyn Parc, within the Ruabon/Llantysilio Mountains and Minera SSSI

Many of the rivers in the AONB have some sort of designation, the River Dee is designated as a SAC and SSSI, whereas 3.31 km (2.06 mi) or 16.93% of the River Alyn are within the boundaries of an SAC, and 1.43 km (0.89 mi) or 16.46% of the River Wheeler passes through designated wildlife sites. 1.06 km (0.66 mi) or 8.16% of the River Alyn is within Loggerheads Country Park, and 1.73 km (1.07 mi) or 5.01% of the River Dee is within either Tŷ Mawr Country Park or Denbighshire Countryside Sites.

There are ten Iron Age hillforts, three motte and bailey castles (Tomen y Rhodwydd, Tomen y Faerdre, and Glyndŵr's Mount), castle ruins at Dyserth Castle, and two 13th Century stone castles at Chirk and Dinas Brân, in the AONB.

== Demographics ==
Map of the Clwydian Range and Dee Valley, with nearby settlements.

The AONB is sparsely populated and rural, with the estimated population of the AONB in 2011 being 18,690, 8,000 of which is classed as being resident in the Dee Valley. On average, the AONB's population is regarded to be collectively older and more economically active or self-employed, than national or regional averages.

There are 31 settlements in the AONB, 23 being in Denbighshire, 6 in Flintshire, and 2 in the Wrexham County Borough parts of the AONB. A large proportion of its residents are confined to the two towns in the AONB, Llangollen and Corwen, and small hamlets or farmsteads. The two towns have a long history of tourism and many of the smaller communities have a deep agricultural tradition or some links with industry such as quarrying. Most of the local authorities' population is concentrated in the towns and cities just outside of the AONB, in particular, the towns of Rhyl and Prestatyn to the north, the conurbation of Deeside and the town of Mold to the north-east, and the city of Wrexham to the east. The AONB is largely upland, quiet and undeveloped, and contains several former quarries.

Located in north-east Wales, near the border with England, and acting as the border in medieval times, the area's culture is influenced by Welsh and English culture. The Welsh language is spoken in the area, and more heavily in rural areas. 30% of residents have full Welsh-language skills in the AONB, higher than the national average.

Religious sites in the AONB include: Valle Crucis Abbey, Rug Chapel, Llangar Old Parish Church, and St Collen's Church, Llangollen.

== Heritage ==
The AONB extends over part of the Pontcysyllte Aqueduct and Canal UNESCO World Heritage Site (WHS), designated on 27 June 2009, before the AONB's extension to the area. The WHS includes sites within the AONB such as Pontcysyllte Aqueduct, Horseshoe Falls, and parts of the Llangollen Canal. Chirk Aqueduct, which is part of the WHS, is not part of the AONB.

The AONB contains 641 listed buildings, 94 scheduled monuments, 17 conservation areas, and 12 historic parks and gardens (parks covering 611.67 ha (6.1167 km^{2}) or 1.57% of the AONB). Many of these sites are overseen by Cadw. 9 additional Historic Parks and Gardens are located just outside the AONB's boundaries.

== Transport and communications ==
The AONB is transversed by arterial A-roads, with the A55, North Wales Expressway passing through the AONB and cutting into the Clwydian Range, with a rock cut-through at Rhuallt Hill. The A5, a historically important and mainly scenic route today, passes through the Dee Valley in the South, and the A494 goes through the AONB at its centre, connecting Ruthin and Mold. Minor B and C roads provide the remaining connections to more remote areas of the AONB. There are no National Rail stations within the AONB, with the nearest being just outside its boundaries, at Chirk, Ruabon and Prestatyn. The Llangollen Railway, a heritage railway, operates along a former passenger route through the Vale of Llangollen along the River Dee. Bus services operate between the main towns within and next to, the AONB; such as the TrawsCymru T3 Dolgellau to Wrexham route which travels through Corwen and Llangollen along the Dee Valley.

== Economy ==
=== Tourism sector ===
A 2014 "State of the AONB" report estimated the total number of visitors to the AONB was 717,000, with revenue totalling £39.4 million. The report further stated that 6% of the population of the area is employed in the tourism sector, estimating a total of 715 people in the sector, compared to 4.9% in the agricultural and forestry sector. Total expenditure was estimated to be £131.81 million in rural Denbighshire, accounting for 42% of Denbighshire's entire expenditure of £314.20 million, with the remaining 58% being for coastal areas. Tourism expenditure in Flintshire and Wrexham is lower than Denbighshire in 2012, estimated to be £200.89 million and £92.67 million respectively, according to the Scarborough Tourism Economic Activity Monitor 2012. The overwhelming majority of visitors to rural Denbighshire are day visitors, accounting for 84% of the 2.4 million visitors. This is a slightly higher percentage of day visitors than coastal Denbighshire at 78%. The remaining 16% of overnight visitors are slightly more likely to accommodate in non-serviced accommodation over serviced accommodation, with the proportion of both accommodations being more balanced than in coastal Denbighshire, where non-serviced accommodation is used 270% more than serviced.

In 2012, the most visited site was Loggerheads Country Park with 164,536 visitors, followed by Moel Famau Country Park (140,000 visitors), Chirk Castle (133,268 visitors), and Llangollen Wharf (128,791 visitors). Sites numbering between 50 and 100,000 visitors are; Tŷ Mawr Country Park (73,592 visitors in 2011) and Llangollen Railway (70,000 visitors). The remaining sites recorded with less than 10,000 visitors include: Glassbobbery (13,815 visitors), Valle Crucis Abbey (8,632 visitors), Plas Newydd (9,319 in 2010), Llangollen Motor Museum (4,448 visitors), Rug Chapel (3,318 visitors), and Minera Country Park and Iron Works (2,220 visitors in 2010).

In 2018, an estimated 1.1 million people visited six key sites across the AONB, generating approximately £24.1 million to the Welsh economy, according to Natural Resources Wales. Concerns were raised over the "detrimental impact" the numbers could have on the landscape, with some sites described to be "too popular for their own good".

== Recreation and tourism ==
Notable outdoor activities in the AONB include: water-based activities (kayaking, whitewater rafting and others), hillclimbing and abseilling, paragliding, paintball, bushcraft, fishing, and archery. Accommodation in the AONB is mainly concentrated in the towns of Llangollen and Corwen, in addition to settlements just outside the AONB.

Mountain biking is popular for tourists and locals to the AONB. Coed Llandegla is regarded to be a national hub for mountain biking, with up to 150,000 visitors every year on its 44 km (27 mi) of bike paths. The NCN5, part of the National Cycle Network, just passes outside the AONB in Prestatyn on the north Wales coast.

The International Music Eisteddfod is held in Llangollen annually, occurring over 6 days in mid-July, the event attracts more than 50,000 people. Other cultural events in the AONB include three walking festivals, two food festivals, and other local outdoor events.

=== Hiking ===
The AONB is covered in an extensive network of public right of ways and permissive walking routes for tourists and locals to use for walks or hikes. According to Denbighshire County Council, there are 772.6 km (480.1 mi) of public rights of way and 324.4 km (201.6 mi) of "promoted routes".

Offa's Dyke National Trail passes through the AONB. From south to north, the northernmost section of the path spans 73 km (45 mi) in the AONB. It enters the AONB at Chirk Castle and Pontcysyllte Aqueduct, it continues past Trevor Hall, before becoming the Panorama Walk as it passes the Trevor and Eglwyseg rocks, with Castell Dinas Brân overlooking the path from a nearby hill. It then passes World's End and Craig y Forwyn, before cutting through Maesyrchen Mountain before reaching Llandegla Forest and Llandegla. The path then transverses across the Clwydian Range passing sites such as Moel Famau, before reaching Bodfari, where it crosses the River Wheeler. It continues along the range, crossing the A55 at Rhuallt, passing Cwm and Dyserth, before reaching Prestatyn and the Irish Sea. The path attracts 33,000 people annually, and its most popular section of the path is between the ridgeline of the Clwydian Range and the Jubilee Tower on Moel Famau.

Other named and waymarked footpaths passing through the AONB include the Dee Valley Way (between Corwen and Llangollen), the North Wales Pilgrims Way (passing at Tremeirchion), and the North Berwyn Way. Footpaths from outside the AONB connect with the towns of Corwen (where it meets the Brenig Way) and Prestatyn (which is on the Wales Coast Path).

Most paths in the AONB are described to be in good condition, with the AONB stating they aim to improve the conditions of paths that are in deteriorating condition.

There is an extensive bridleway network in the AONB, with its network regarded to be more extensive than in the local authorities overall, with part of Denbighshire's 183 km (114 mi) of bridleways in the AONB. The Sea Horse Ride horseriding route, part of the National Bridleroute Network, runs in the south of the AONB. It is 53 mi (85 km) long, with some parts on roads, and runs from Glyndyfrdwy in the Dee Valley to Talacre north of the AONB on the north Wales coast.
