= Laura Kyrke-Smith =

British politician (born 1983)

Laura Kyrke-Smith MP
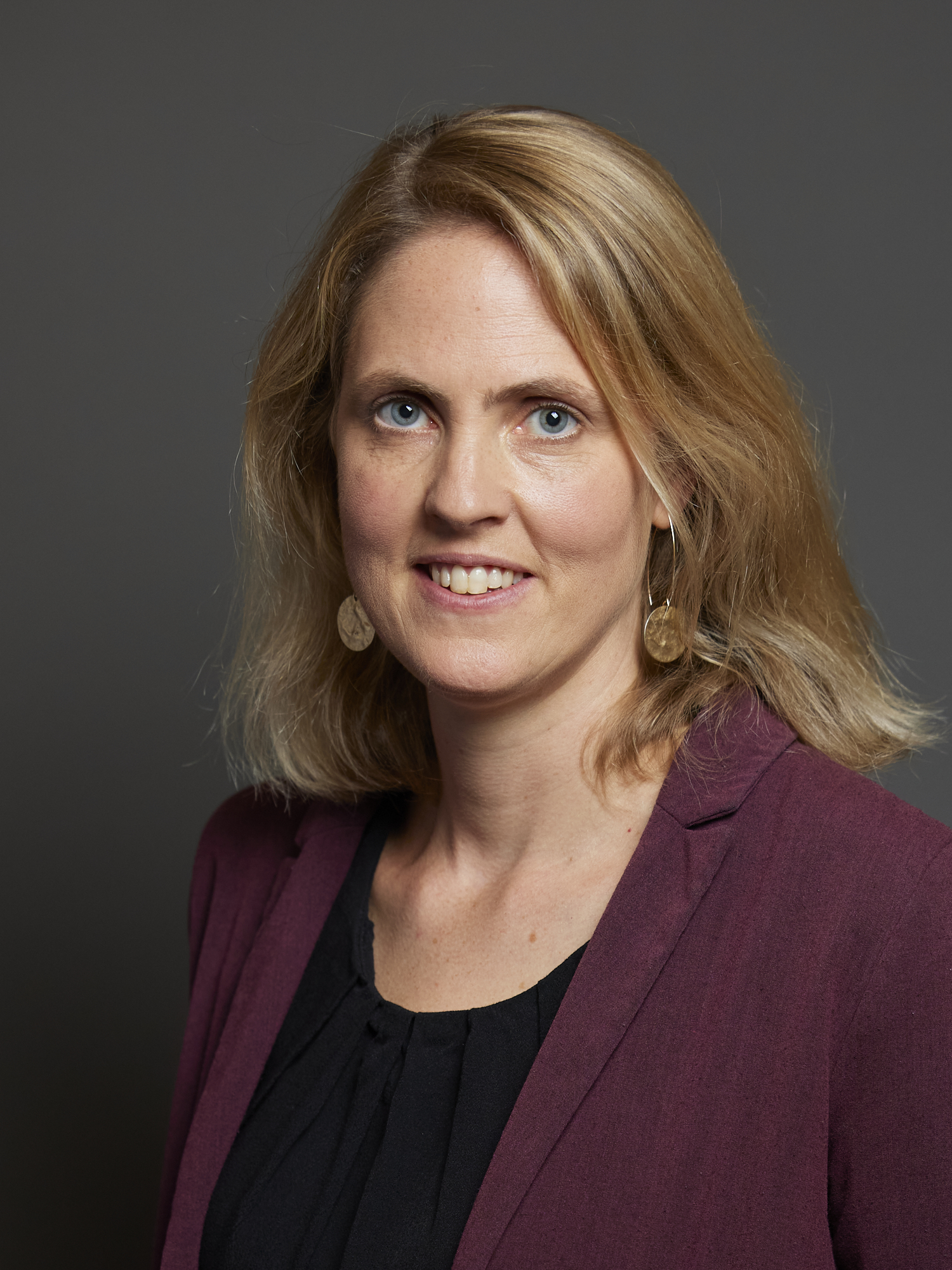
- Official portrait, 2024

Member of Parliament for Aylesbury
- Incumbent
- Assumed office 4 July 2024
- Preceded by: Rob Butler
- Constituency: Aylesbury
- Majority: 630 (1.3%)

Personal details
- Born: Laura Elizabeth Kyrke-Smith; 15 September 1983 (age 43)
- Party: Labour
- Education: Robinson College, Cambridge (BA); London School of Economics (MSc)
- Website: www.lauraforaylesbury.org

Laura Elizabeth Kyrke-Smith (born 15 September 1983) is a Labour politician, academic and charity worker who has been the Member of Parliament (MP) for Aylesbury since 2024. A member of the Labour Party, she is the first Labour MP for Aylesbury as well as the first female MP to represent Aylesbury in the House of Commons.

== Early life ==
Kyrke-Smith was born in September 1983 to Peter St. L Kyrke-Smith, son of BHS Kyrke-Smith of Penbedw estate near Nannerch in Wales, and to Lyndsay Madeleine Pelly, daughter of Peter Jeremy Pelly and his wife Dorothy Joan Hill..

Kyrke-Smith was state educated before attending Robinson College, Cambridge, from 2002 to 2005, where she read history and volunteered with the charity Student Action for Refugees. She then went on to study for an MSc in international relations at the London School of Economics (LSE), graduating in 2007.

She was chair of the socialist society Labour Campaign for International Development from 2013 to 2017, and also worked at Portland Communications and in the Foreign and Commonwealth Office as a policy analyst.

== Professional career ==
From 2016 to 2024 Kyrke-Smith worked for the International Rescue Committee. From 2021 to 2024 she was on the Board of the Disasters Emergency Committee (DEC).

== Political career ==
In the 2021 Buckinghamshire Council elections Kyrke-Smith stood for Labour in the Little Chalfont & Amersham Common ward coming 8th out of the eleven candidates with 448 votes.

In the 2024 general election, she gained the Aylesbury seat from Rob Butler, a member of the Conservative Party. Her victory ended a century-long streak of Conservative and Unionist MPs in Aylesbury, starting in the 1924 general election.

In September 2024, Kyrke-Smith was appointed to the role of Labour's National Health Mission Delivery Champion. In February 2025, she was appointed as a Parliamentary Private Secretary to Steve Reed, the Secretary of State for Environment, Food and Rural Affairs. In September 2025, she was appointed as a Parliamentary Private Secretary to Steve Reed MP, the Secretary of State for Housing, Communities and Local Government.

On 22 October 2025, Kyrke-Smith introduced 'Sophie's Law', a Private Members' Bill that advocated for more rigorous NHS mental health checks for mothers during pregnancy and after birth. Perinatal mental health has been a focus throughout Kyrke-Smith's parliamentary career, after the postpartum suicide of her close friend, Sophie Middlemiss.

On 20 May 2026, she was appointed Parliamentary Private Secretary to the Department of Health and Social Care.

== Select bibliography ==
- Kyrke-Smith, Laura (October 2007). Berry, Craig (ed.). "Information Intervention and the case of Kosovo: Realising the Responsibility to Protect" (PDF). Knowledge Politics Quarterly. 1 (1). Knowledge Politics. Archived from the original (PDF) on 6 October 2007.
- Kyrke-Smith, Laura (11 December 2007). ""Information intervention": A Test of Democratic Intent". Open Democracy. London.
- Kyrke, Laura, ed. (2007). "Kosovo: is the media wishing for war?; On the eve of something big in media; The view from the Nigerian newsroom; The future of African journalism". Development, governance and the media: The role of the media in building African society (PDF) (1st ed.). POLIS – Journalism and Society (London School of Economics and Political Science).
- Kyrke-Smith, Laura (June 2015). "Social Philanthropists". In Kyrke-Smith, Laura; Le Masson, Charlotte (eds.). Communicating Global Giving: The Power of Communications in the Era of Philanthropy (PDF) (1st ed.). Strand, London: Thinking Publications (Portland Communications). pp. 24–25. Archived (PDF) from the original on 8 July 2024.
- Kyrke-Smith, Laura (2017). "7 - Making the Case for Aid: Trump and International Development". In Kearns, Ian; Murray, Kate (eds.). The Age of Trump: Foreign Policy Challenges for the left (1st ed.). London: Fabian Society. pp. 49–57. ISBN 9780716341291.

Parliament of the United Kingdom
Preceded by Rob Butler	Member of Parliament for Aylesbury; 2024–present	Incumbent
