= David Lidington =

British politician (born 1956)

The Right Honourable Sir David Lidington KCB CBE
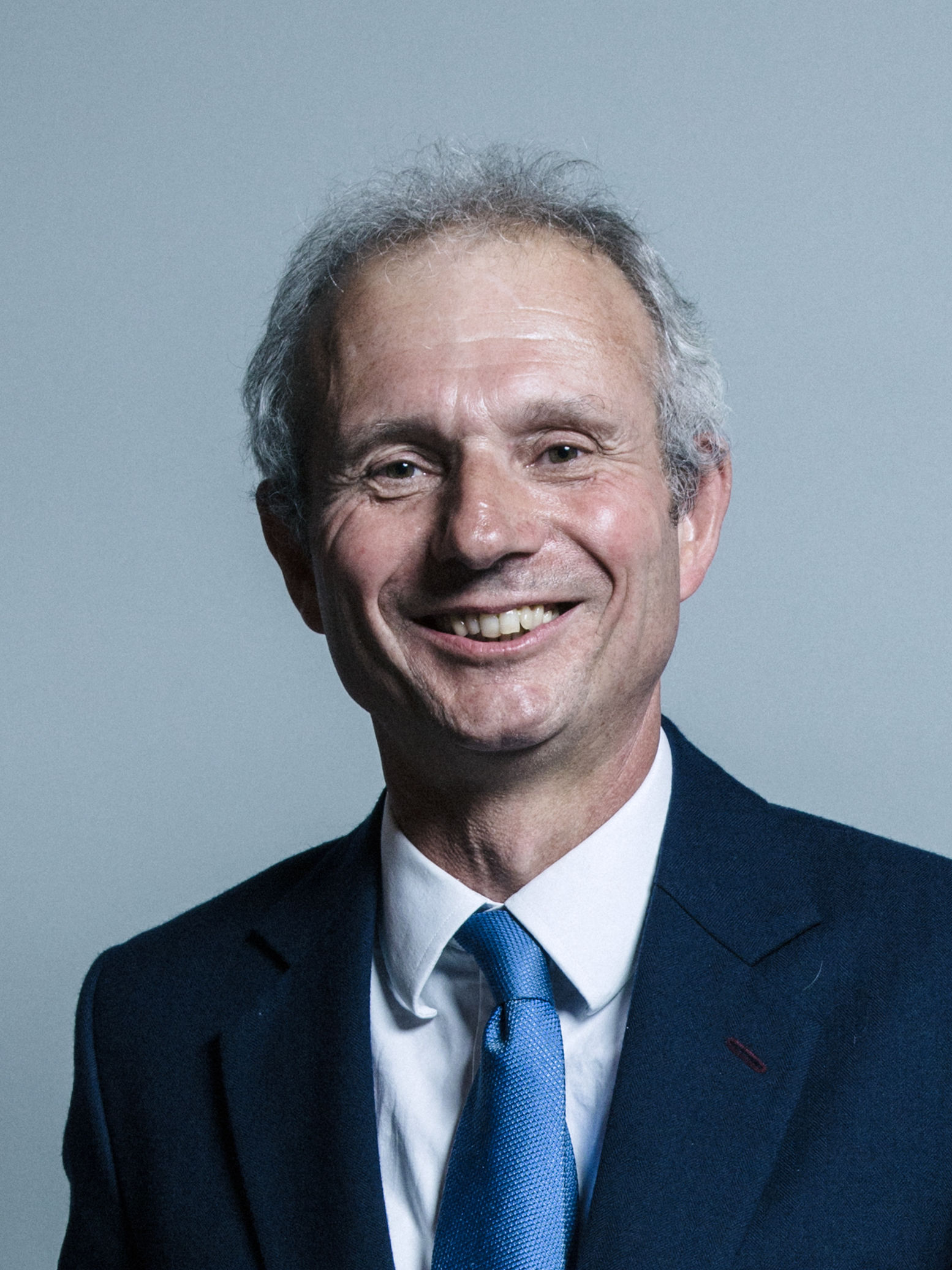
- Official portrait, 2017

Chancellor of the Duchy of Lancaster
- In office 8 January 2018 – 24 July 2019
- Prime Minister: Theresa May
- Preceded by: Patrick McLoughlin
- Succeeded by: Michael Gove

Minister for the Cabinet Office
- In office 8 January 2018 – 24 July 2019
- Prime Minister: Theresa May
- Preceded by: Damian Green
- Succeeded by: Oliver Dowden

Secretary of State for Justice; Lord Chancellor
- In office 11 June 2017 – 8 January 2018
- Prime Minister: Theresa May
- Preceded by: Liz Truss
- Succeeded by: David Gauke

Leader of the House of Commons Lord President of the Council
- In office 14 July 2016 – 11 June 2017
- Prime Minister: Theresa May
- Preceded by: Chris Grayling
- Succeeded by: Andrea Leadsom

Minister of State for Europe
- In office 12 May 2010 – 14 July 2016
- Prime Minister: David Cameron
- Preceded by: Chris Bryant
- Succeeded by: Alan Duncan
Shadow Cabinet posts
Shadow Secretary of State for Northern Ireland
In office 11 November 2003 – 2 July 2007
Leader	Michael Howard; David Cameron
Preceded by	Quentin Davies
Succeeded by	Owen Paterson
Shadow Secretary of State for Environment, Food and Rural Affairs
In office 23 July 2002 – 11 November 2003
Leader	Iain Duncan Smith
Preceded by	Peter Ainsworth
Succeeded by	Caroline Spelman (Environment)

Member of Parliament for Aylesbury
- In office 9 April 1992 – 6 November 2019
- Preceded by: Timothy Raison
- Succeeded by: Rob Butler

Personal details
- Born: David Roy Lidington; 30 June 1956 (age 70) Lambeth, London, England
- Party: Conservative
- Spouse: Helen Parry (m. 1989)
- Children: 4
- Education: Sidney Sussex College, Cambridge (BA, PhD)

Academic background
- Thesis: The enforcement of the penal statutes at the Court of Exchequer c. 1558 - c.1576. (1988)

Sir David Roy Lidington (born 30 June 1956) is a British former politician who was the Member of Parliament (MP) for Aylesbury from 1992 until 2019. A member of the Conservative Party, he served as Chancellor of the Duchy of Lancaster and Minister for the Cabinet Office from 2018 to 2019 and was frequently described as being Theresa May's de facto Deputy Prime Minister.

Between 2010 and 2016, he served as Minister of State for Europe holding the position for the entirety of David Cameron's premiership, a longer period than any of his predecessors. Theresa May appointed him to the cabinet for the first time in June 2016, where he held a number of roles including Leader of the House of Commons, and the joint title of Lord Chancellor and Secretary of State for Justice. He resigned from the government on 24 July 2019, in anticipation of the appointment of Boris Johnson as Prime Minister. He did not seek reelection in the 2019 general election.

== Early life and career ==
Born in Lambeth, Lidington was educated at Merchant Taylors' Prep School and later at Haberdashers' Aske's Boys' School. He studied Modern History at Sidney Sussex College, Cambridge. His PhD was entitled The Enforcement of the Penal Statutes at the Court of the Exchequer c. 1558 - c. 1576.

While at Cambridge, he was chairman of Cambridge University Conservative Association and Deputy President of the Cambridge University Students' Union. He was the Captain of the Sidney Sussex team that won the 1979 series of University Challenge. The team also won the 2002 University Challenge – Reunited "champion of champions" series for the show's 40th anniversary.

Lidington's early employment included posts with BP and the Rio Tinto Group before being appointed in 1987 as special adviser to the then Home Secretary Douglas Hurd. He moved to the Foreign and Commonwealth Office in 1989 when Hurd was appointed Foreign Secretary.

In the 1987 general election, Lidington stood unsuccessfully in the Vauxhall constituency.

== Parliamentary career ==
=== From 1992 to 2010 ===
Lidington was selected as the Conservative candidate for the safe seat of Aylesbury in December 1990. He became the constituency's member of parliament at the 1992 general election.

At Westminster, Lidington previously participated in the Education Select Committee and Conservative Backbench Home Affairs Committee. In 1994, he successfully promoted a Private Members Bill which became the Chiropractors Act 1994.

Lidington first joined the Conservative front bench team in August 1994, when he became Parliamentary private secretary to Home Secretary Michael Howard. In June 1997, with the Conservatives in opposition, he became Parliamentary private secretary to Leader of the Opposition William Hague. Two years later, in June 1999, he was promoted to become Shadow Home Affairs Minister (deputy to Ann Widdecombe). In September 2001, Lidington was promoted to become Shadow Financial Secretary to the Treasury.

==== Shadow Cabinet ====
Lidington became a member of the Shadow Cabinet in May 2002, replacing Ann Winterton as Shadow Minister of Agriculture, Fisheries and Food (later Shadow Secretary of State for Environment, Food and Rural Affairs) after she resigned. When Michael Howard was elected Conservative Party leader in November 2003, Lidington became Shadow Secretary of State for Northern Ireland, but was not included as a member of the Shadow Cabinet.

In May 2005, Howard enlarged the Shadow Cabinet, granting Lidington the right to attend it again. He continued to serve as the Shadow Secretary of State for Northern Ireland under David Cameron. On 2 July 2007, was appointed as a Shadow Minister of State for Foreign Affairs.

==== Expenses (2009) ====
In May 2009, The Daily Telegraph revealed Lidington had claimed nearly £1,300 for his dry cleaning and had also claimed for toothpaste, shower gel, body spray and vitamin supplements on his second home allowance. Lidington repaid the claims.

Lidington was also criticised by local newspaper The Bucks Herald for claiming £115,891 in expenses in one year, almost double his salary.

=== Since the 2010 general election ===
Following the 2010 general election, Lidington was appointed Minister for Europe. In August 2016 following the resignation of David Cameron, Lidington was appointed a CBE in the 2016 Prime Minister's Resignation Honours for his services to the government as European minister.

In November 2013, Lidington was criticised in an editorial of the local newspaper the Bucks Herald after he abstained on votes on the HS2 rail project which will run through his constituency.

On 7 December 2016, when he was serving as Leader of the House of Commons, Lidington deputised for Prime Minister Theresa May at PMQs questioned first-hand by the Shadow Foreign Secretary, Emily Thornberry who also deputised, as per custom, for Jeremy Corbyn on the day.

Under Prime Minister Theresa May, Lidington was appointed Leader of the House of Commons and Lord President of the Council. This was a position he held till 11 June 2017, when he was promoted to Justice Secretary and Lord Chancellor. His appointment was criticised due to his record on LGBT rights, having opposed scrapping the ban on 'promotion of homosexuality' in schools, as well as civil partnerships. During the debate on the legalisation of same-sex marriage he argued that "marriage was for the procreation of children" and that the "definition of marriage should not be changed without an extremely compelling case for doing so". He later said that he regretted voting against civil partnerships.

On 8 January 2018, during a cabinet reshuffle, Lidington became the Chancellor of the Duchy of Lancaster and Minister for the Cabinet Office. Several media outlets subsequently referred to Lidington as Theresa May's de facto Deputy Prime Minister and a candidate for her succession. Despite this, Lidington said that he had 'no wish' to become Prime minister, stating that Theresa May was 'doing a fantastic job'. On 24 July 2019, Lidington resigned as Cabinet Office Minister and Chancellor of the Duchy of Lancaster, and on 10 September, he was appointed a Knight Commander of the Order of the Bath in Theresa May's resignation honours "for political and public service".

During the 2019 Conservative leadership election, Lidington backed Matt Hancock and Rory Stewart. At the final stage of the leadership election, he supported Jeremy Hunt over Boris Johnson.

Writing in his local newspaper, The Bucks Herald, on 30 October 2019, Lidington said he was not planning to seek re-election at the next general election. Lidington officially stepped down as the MP for Aylesbury on 6 November 2019.

== Personal life ==
Lidington and his wife Helen have four sons. He was raised as a Congregationalist but is now an Anglican.

Parliament of the United Kingdom
Preceded by Timothy Raison	Member of Parliament for Aylesbury; 1992–2019	Succeeded by Rob Butler
Political offices
Preceded by Gary Streeter	Parliamentary Private Secretary to the Leader of the Opposition; 1997–1999	Succeeded by John Whittingdale
Preceded by Peter Ainsworth	Shadow Secretary of State for Environment, Food and Rural Affairs; 2002–2003	Succeeded by Caroline Spelman as Shadow Secretary of State for Environment
Preceded by Quentin Davies	Shadow Secretary of State for Northern Ireland; 2003–2007	Succeeded by Owen Paterson
Preceded by Chris Bryant	Minister of State for Europe; 2010–2016	Succeeded by Alan Duncan as Minister of State for Europe and the Americas
Preceded by Chris Grayling	Leader of the House of Commons; 2016–2017	Succeeded by Andrea Leadsom
Preceded by Chris Grayling	Lord President of the Council; 2016–2017	Succeeded by Andrea Leadsom
Preceded by Liz Truss	Secretary of State for Justice; 2017–2018	Succeeded by David Gauke
Preceded by Liz Truss	Lord High Chancellor of Great Britain; 2017–2018	Succeeded by David Gauke
Preceded by Sir Patrick McLoughlin	Chancellor of the Duchy of Lancaster; 2018–2019	Succeeded by Michael Gove
Preceded by Damian Green	Minister for the Cabinet Office; 2018–2019	Succeeded by Oliver Dowden
