= Bryn Alyn =

Hill and SSSI in Denbighshire, Wales

Coordinates: 53.1213°N 3.2010°W

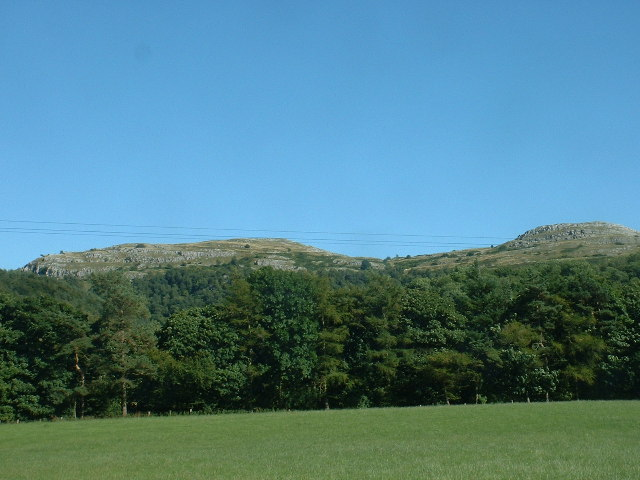
Bryn Alyn

Bryn Alyn is a hill and Site of Special Scientific Interest in Denbighshire, North Wales, and forms part of the Clwydian Range and Dee Valley Area of Outstanding Natural Beauty. Bryn Alyn lies in the community of Llanarmon-yn-Iâl, to the east of the River Alyn, with the valley of Dyffryn Alyn separating it from the main range of the Clwydian hills. At just 408m, Bryn Alyn's significance is not in its height, but in the dramatic west-facing limestone cliffs, which can be seen from the nearby A494 trunk road and from many of the walking routes in the southern Clwydian hills. Areas of natural limestone pavement can be found throughout the upper parts of the hill. The main points of access to Bryn Alyn are from the nearby villages of Llanferres and Eryrys. A nature information board for Bryn Alyn can be found in the layby on the A494 just south of Llanferres, at grid reference SJ188600.
