= Moel y Gaer, Llantysilio =

Hillfort in Denbighshire, Wales

Moel y Gaer
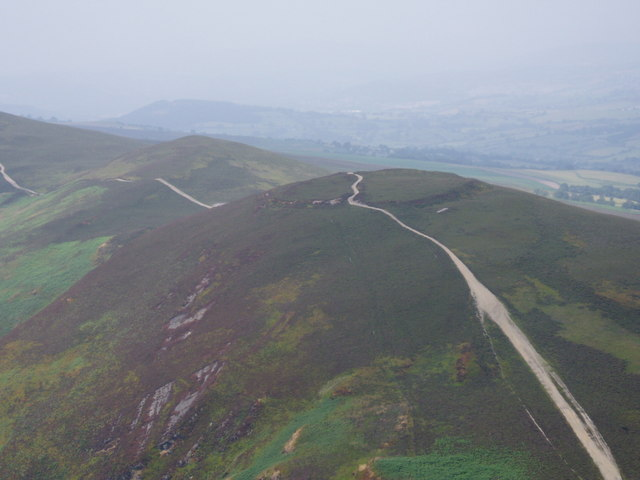
- Moel y Gaer, Llantysilio

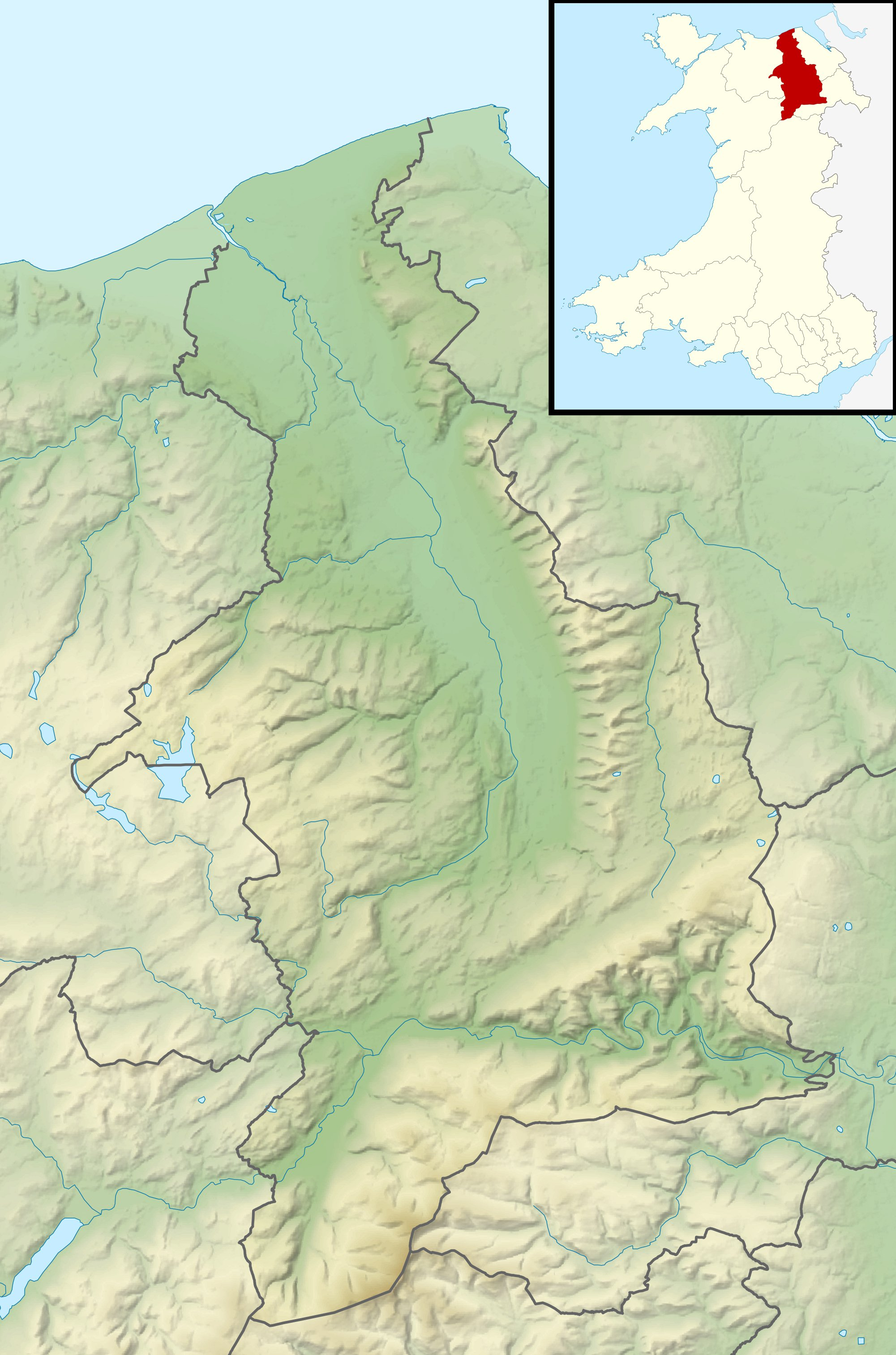
- Location in Denbighshire
- 53.0081°N 3.2428°W
- Type: hillfort
- Location: Denbighshire, Wales
- OS grid reference: SJ 16705 46365

Site notes
- Elevation: 504 metres (1,654 ft)

Scheduled monument
- Official name: Moel y Gaer, Cefn
- Reference no.: DE126
- Community: Bryneglwys

Moel y Gaer (Welsh for "bald hill of the fortress") is an Iron Age hillfort on a summit of Llantysilio Mountain, northwest of the town of Llangollen, Denbighshire, Wales. The site is a scheduled monument classified as a prehistoric defensive hillfort.

The hillfort is also protected and managed as part of the Heather and Hillforts Project. The project includes six hillforts: the four most southerly of the hillforts in the Clwydian Range (Penycloddiau, Moel Arthur, Moel y Gaer Llanbedr, and Moel Fenlli), this hillfort and Caer Drewyn.

== Description ==
The defensive works at Moel y Gaer comprise a roughly oval area measuring about 140 metres (460 ft) east-west by 100 metres (330 ft), enclosing approximately 0.95 hectares (2.3 acres), and consist of a single rampart and a discontinuous ditch, with a single entrance on the eastern side. The stone bank is up to 3.1 metres (10 ft) high externally and 0.6 metres (2.0 ft) internally, and the ditch to the north is 10 metres (33 ft) wide. The summit reaches 503.5 metres (1,652 ft) above sea level. A track crossing the site from east to west, used by pedestrians and drivers of off-road vehicles, presents a threat to the archaeological remains.

== Excavations and surveys ==
As part of the Heather and Hillforts Project a topographic survey was commissioned, which took place between December 2006 and January 2007. The survey recorded the remains of 11 roundhouse platforms within the enclosure, concentrated on the eastern side. A geophysical survey followed in 2009, which identified more possible roundhouses, along with possible internal tracks and two potential rectangular structures.

In 2010 an archaeological excavation identified two roundhouses of about 7 metres (23 ft) diameter from different periods of occupation, and the results showed preservation of significant archaeological deposits in the interior of the hillfort, but also the fragile nature of the resource.

== See also ==
- List of hillforts in Wales
