= Dee Valley Way =

Hiking trail in north Wales

Dee Valley Way / Llwybr Dyffryn Dyfrdwy
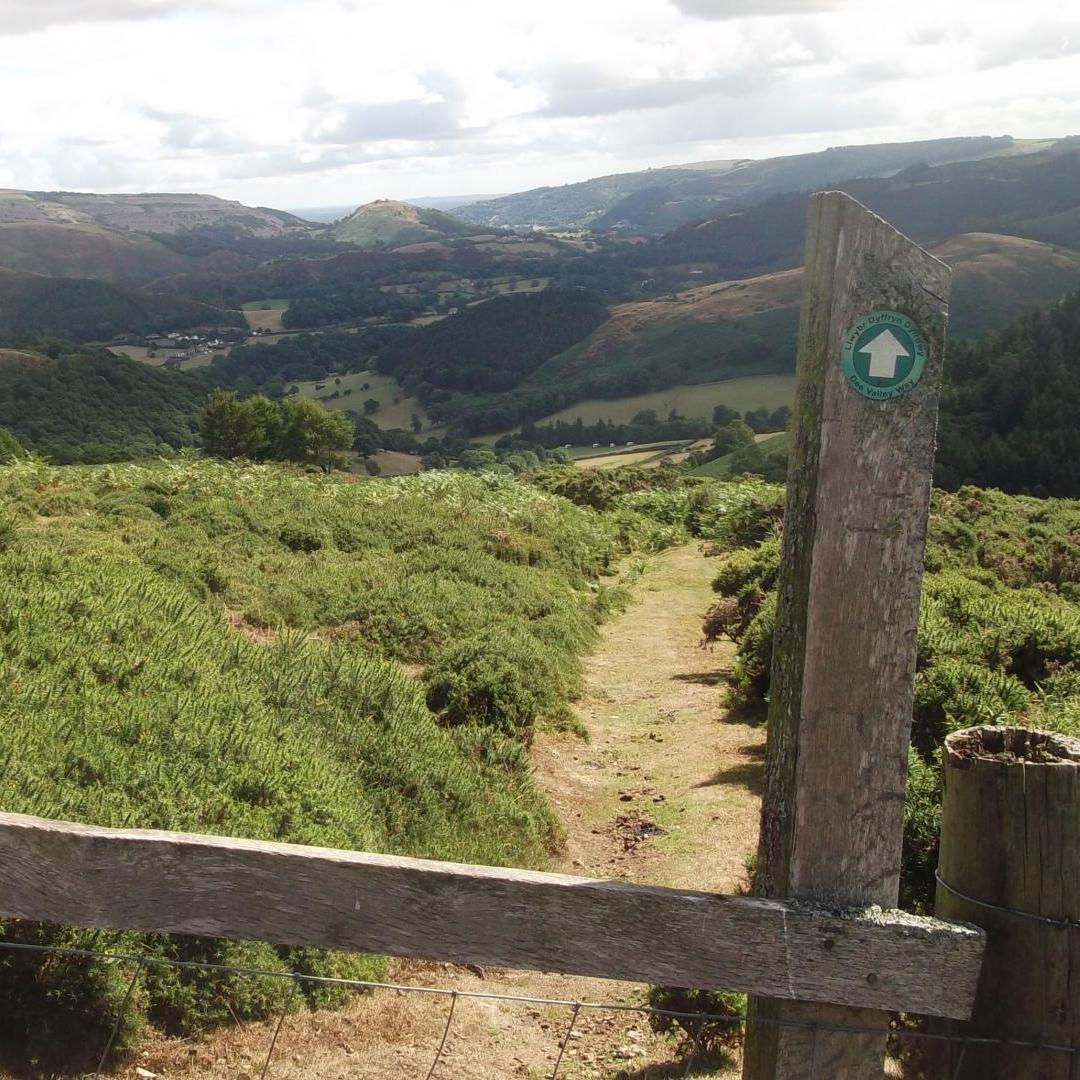
- Stile on slope of Moel Morfydd
- Length: 21 km (13 mi)
- Location: Denbighshire, Wales
- Trailheads: Corwen, Llangollen
- Use: Hiking
- Highest point: Bwlch y Groes, 414 m (1,358 ft)
- Lowest point: Llangollen
- Difficulty: Medium
- Season: All
- Hazards: Stiles

The Dee Valley Way (Welsh: Llwybr Dyffryn Dyfrdwy) is a Hiking Trail that runs between Corwen and Llangollen in north Wales. The Way is 21 km (13 miles) long. The guide splits it into five sections that are accessible by road.

== Route ==
The exact route has changed over the years but has always followed the N side of the valley. From Corwen it crosses the Dee and detours up to Caer Drewyn hillfort before returning to the river at Carrog. About 1km out of Carrog the route heads up the hillside to join a track in the wood emerging in uplands. It then heads NE up to the moorland of Bwlch y Groes, meeting the minor road which goes over the pass. Next it skirts the head of Cwm Tydi before descending to the river at Rhewl. A further detour through Landynan avoids the road before reaching Horseshoe Falls, from where the canal is followed into Llangollen.
