= Eryrys =

Village in Denbighshire, Wales

Coordinates: 53.112°N 3.190°W

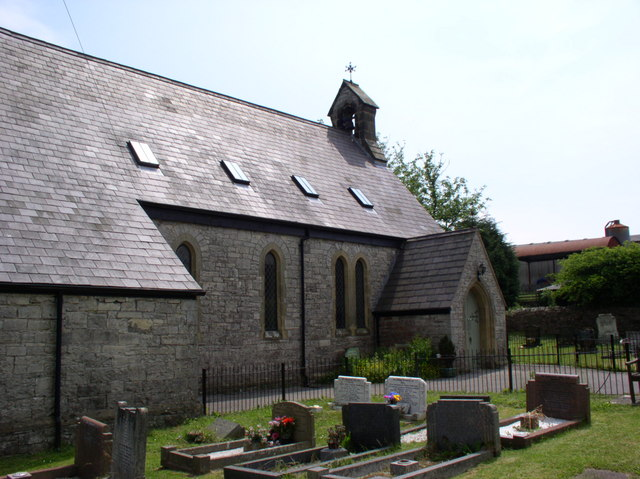
- St David's church (probably a design by Thomas Henry Wyatt), which closed in the 1980s and is now a community centre.

- Location within Denbighshire
- OS grid reference: SJ203578
- Community: Llanarmon-yn-Ial
- Principal area: Denbighshire
- Preserved county: Clwyd
- Country: Wales
- Sovereign state: United Kingdom
- Post town: Mold
- Postcode district: CH7
- Dialling code: 01824
- Police: North Wales
- Fire: North Wales
- Ambulance: Welsh
- UK Parliament: Clwyd East
- Senedd Cymru – Welsh Parliament: Clwyd West

Eryrys (Welsh pronunciation: [ɛˈrərɪs]; alternate spelling Erryrys) is a village in Denbighshire, Wales, located at approximate grid reference SJ203578, five miles south of Mold. The village is built on the limestone formation of Bryn Alyn and many limestone outcrops can be seen close by. At 355m above sea level, Eryrys is one of a number of villages with a valid claim to be the highest in Wales; others include Bwlchgwyn, Wrexham (341m, but has a still-active church, which Eryrys does not), and Garn-yr-Erw, Torfaen (390m, but has no church or pub).

A number of sources suggested that the name is derived from the Welsh Erw Yrys, or the "acre (erw) of Gyrys", sometimes linked with the "Hen Gyrys o Iâl" identified as the author of early Welsh collections of proverbs. Given the similarity of the place-name to the Welsh word eryres, meaning "a flock of eagles", it has also been suggested that the name refers to eagles once frequenting the high ground and prominent outcrops of the area.

There are several limestone quarries close to the village, some now closed but others still actively serving the local cement industry. Eryrys was formerly a lead-mining community, with the remains of several mines still visible nearby, although lead-mining in the area ceased in the late 19th century. The land around Eryrys is now primarily used for sheep-grazing, with also some dairy farming. Eryrys lies on the edge of the Clwydian Range and Dee Valley Area of Outstanding Natural Beauty and many walking routes go through or around the village.

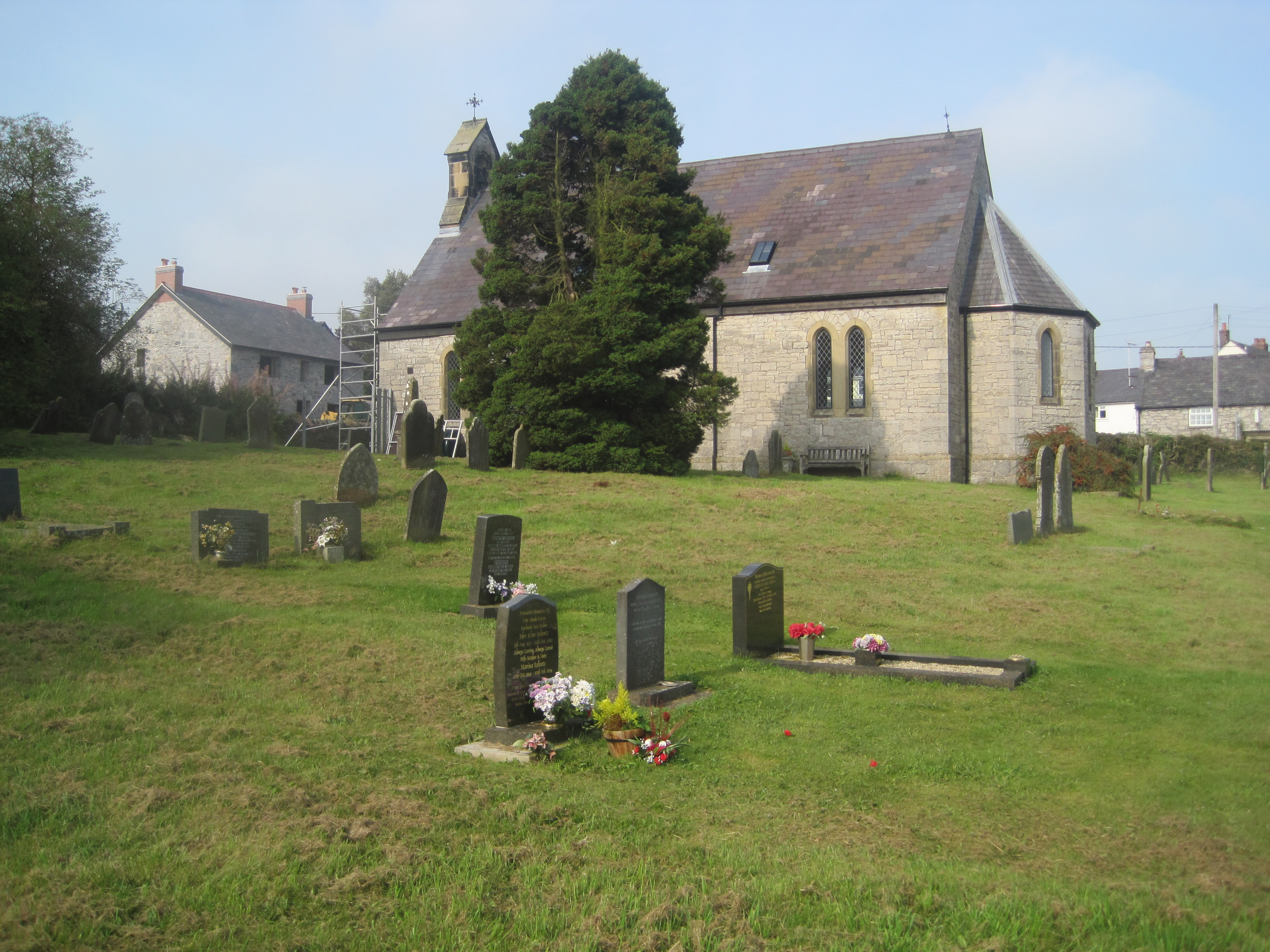

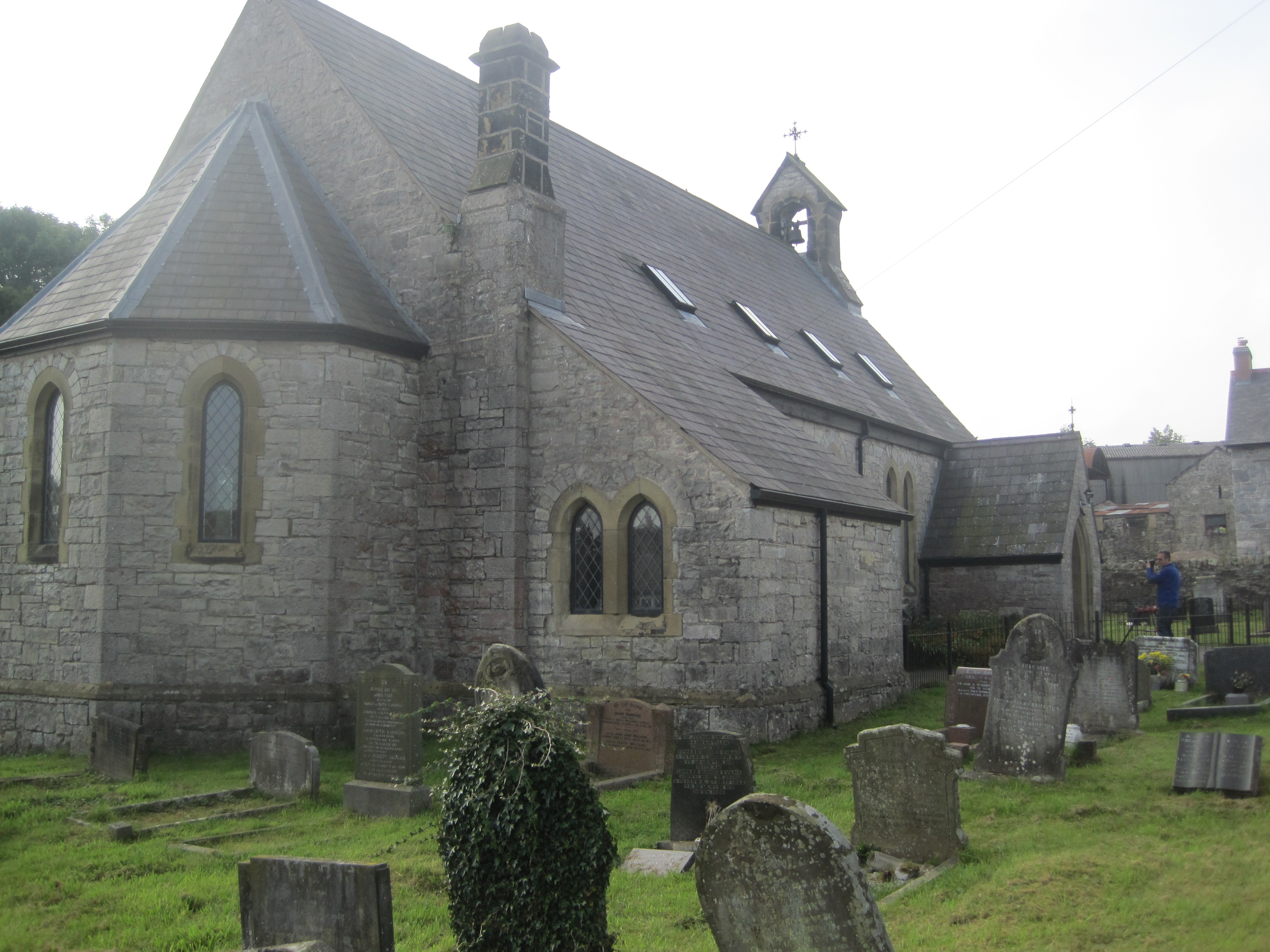

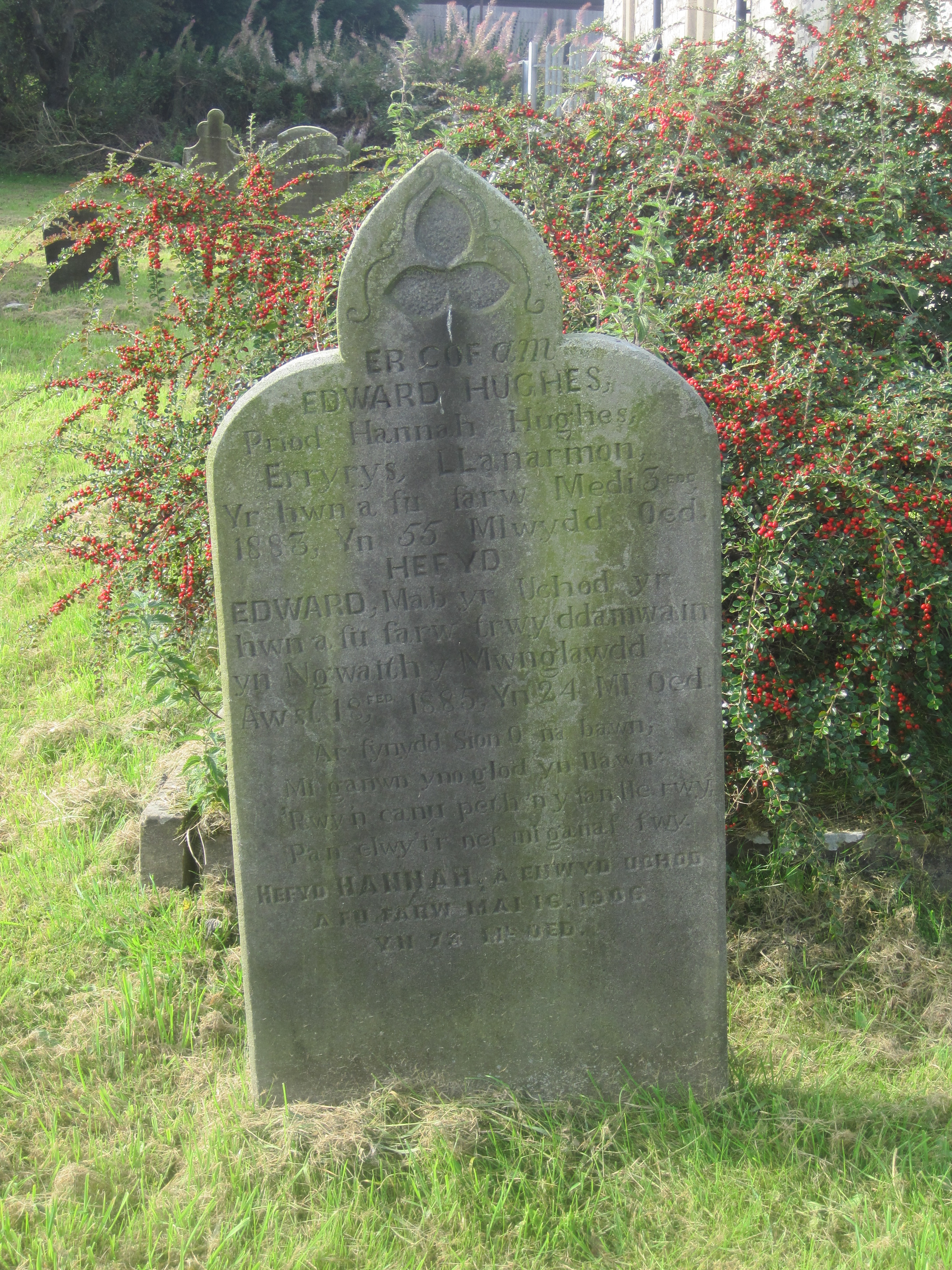

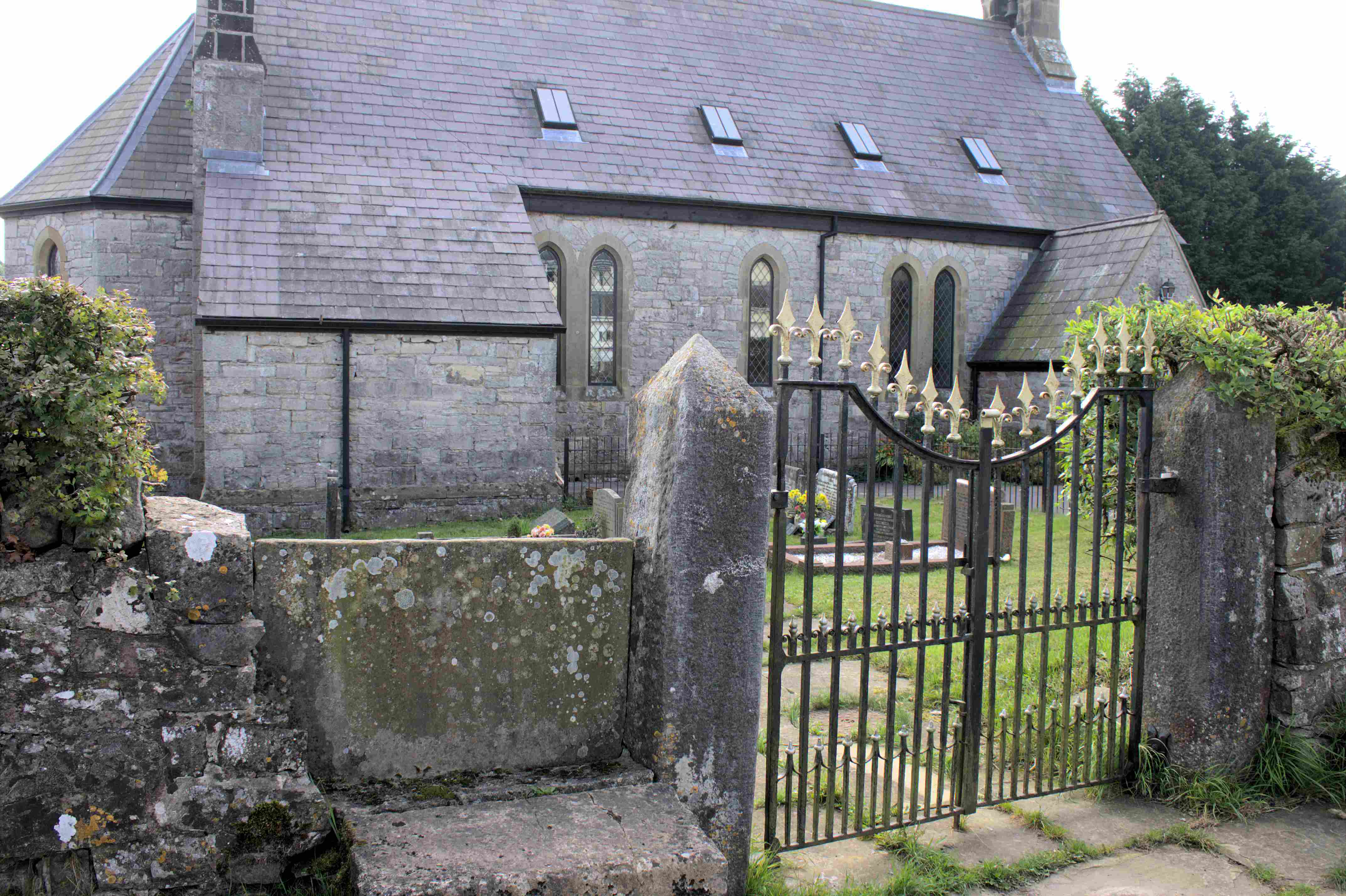
