= Rob Butler (politician) =

British politician (born 1967)

Rob Butler OBE
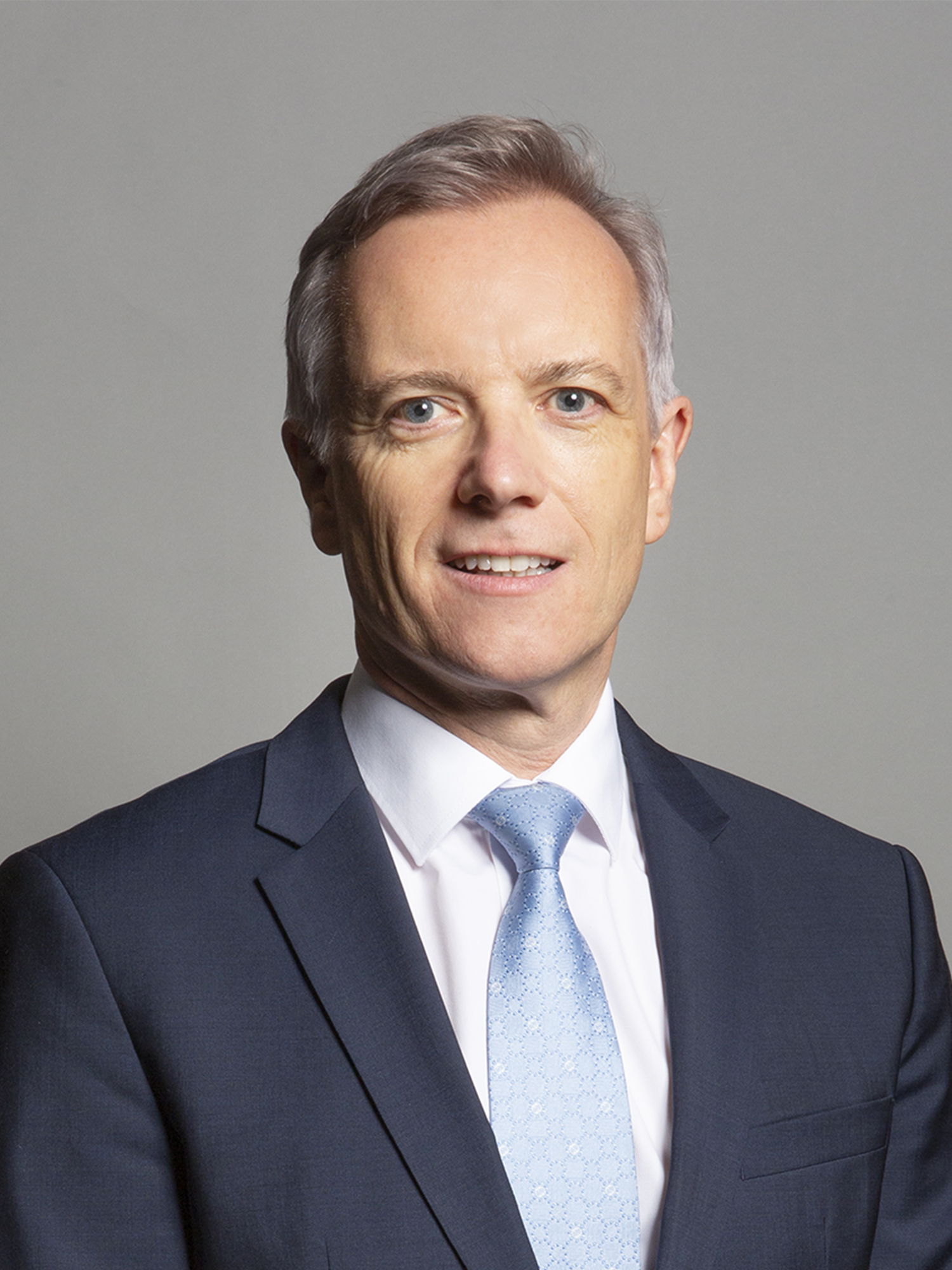
- Official portrait, 2019

Parliamentary Under-Secretary of State for Prisons and Probation
- In office 20 September 2022 – 27 October 2022
- Leader: Liz Truss
- Preceded by: Stuart Andrew
- Succeeded by: Damian Hinds

Member of Parliament for Aylesbury
- In office 12 December 2019 – 30 May 2024
- Preceded by: David Lidington
- Succeeded by: Laura Kyrke-Smith

Personal details
- Born: Robert Butler; 19 June 1967 (age 59) Aylesbury, Buckinghamshire, England
- Party: Conservative
- Education: University of Sheffield

Robert Butler (born 19 June 1967) is a British Conservative Party politician who was the Member of Parliament (MP) for Aylesbury from 2019 to 2024. He served as Parliamentary Under-Secretary of State for Prisons and Probation between September and October 2022.

== Early life and education ==
Robert Butler was born in Aylesbury, Buckinghamshire. His earliest years were spent in Bedgrove, until his family moved to Bicester. He attended the University of Sheffield, where he studied French and Economics.

== Early career ==
Butler's career began as a TV presenter at the BBC and later Channel 5, where he presented that channel's lunchtime news from its launch in 1997 until the end of 2004. In 2005, he founded a communication and lobbying consultancy, which worked with large and small companies around the world, such as the private healthcare company Bupa.

In 2010, he joined the lobbying firm Pagefield at its launch, as an associate partner and was still listed as a specialist partner in their senior advisory team at the time of the 2019 election. During that time Pagefield worked with many clients including tobacco giants British American Tobacco, Philip Morris International, arms manufacturer and systems advisors BAE Systems, and the government of Azerbaijan, while its sister company Pagefield Global Counsel provides public relations services to clients such as the Kingdom of Saudi Arabia in relation to the Saudi Arabian-led intervention in Yemen.

Prior to his election to Parliament, Butler was also a director of His Majesty's Prison and Probation Service.

== Parliamentary career ==
At the 2019 general election, Butler was elected as MP for his hometown of Aylesbury with 54% of the vote and a majority of 17,373.

While never opposing it in votes or other action, Butler criticised the HS2 project in words, calling it an "unwanted and ludicrously expensive railway". Butler served on the Justice Select Committee from March 2020 and was a member of the Armed Forces Parliamentary Scheme for 2020 to 2022.

On 13 June 2022, Butler was appointed Parliamentary private secretary to Liz Truss, the Foreign Secretary. He resigned from this position on 7 July 2022 amid the July 2022 United Kingdom government crisis.

Butler contested the Aylesbury seat in the 2024 general election, but was defeated by the Labour Party candidate, Laura Kyrke-Smith.

== Post-parliamentary career ==
Since his defeat at the 2024 general election, Butler has worked as a freelance political advisor.

== Honours ==
Butler was appointed Officer of the Order of the British Empire (OBE) on 29 December 2023 in Truss's resignation honours list.

Parliament of the United Kingdom
Preceded by David Lidington	Member of Parliament for Aylesbury; 2019–2024	Succeeded by Laura Kyrke-Smith
