= Moel y Gamelin =

Hill in Denbighshire, Wales

- The cairn atop Moel y Gamelin, with Moel y Gaer and Moel Morfydd in the background

Highest point
- Elevation: 577 m (1,893 ft)
- Prominence: 382 m (1,253 ft)
- Listing: Marilyn
- Coordinates: 53°00′35″N 3°13′44″W

Geography
- Location within Wales
- Location: Denbighshire, North Wales
- Parent range: Clwydian Range
- OS grid: SJ176465

Both Llantysilio Mountain and Maesyrchen Mountain re-direct here.

Moel y Gamelin is a hill in Denbighshire, North Wales, to the northwest of the town of Llangollen. It is the highest summit of a range which stretches eastwards from near the village of Carrog to the Horseshoe Pass (Welsh: Bwlch yr Oernant) traversed by the A542 road, and reaches an elevation of 577 metres (1,893 ft) above sea level. The western part of the range is known as Llantysilio Mountain whilst the eastern end is referred to as Maesyrchen Mountain. At its top is a round cairn, of unknown date, measuring about 30 metres (100 ft) in diameter and 1.8 metres (6 ft) high. It is in the Clwydian Range and Dee Valley Area of Outstanding Natural Beauty.

Drone footage of the impact of a fire on Llantysilio Mountain during the summer of 2018
