= Chwarel Pant Glas =

Protected area in Clwyd, Wales

- Site of Special Scientific Interest
- Location within Wales
- Location of Chwarel Pant Glas.
- Area of search: Clwyd
- Grid reference: SJ2147047740
- Coordinates: 53.02117°N 3.1721723°W
- Interest: Geology
- Area: 0.65 ha (1.6 acres)
- Notification date: 1 June 1990

Chwarel Pant Glas is a Site of Special Scientific Interest in the preserved county of Clwyd, north Wales.

== See also ==
- List of Sites of Special Scientific Interest in Clwyd
