= The Bucks Herald =

- Type: Weekly newspaper
- Format: Compact
- Owner(s): National World
- Publisher: Premier Newspapers Ltd
- Editor: Hayley O'Keeffe
- Founded: 1832
- Language: English
- Headquarters: Aylesbury, Buckinghamshire
- Circulation: 798 (as of 2024)
- Website: bucksherald.co.uk

The Bucks Herald is a weekly newspaper, published every Wednesday and covering Aylesbury and its surrounding villages in the Aylesbury Vale area of Buckinghamshire, England. It was first published on 7 January 1832.

== History ==
At its launch the full title of the newspaper was The Bucks Herald, Farmers' Journal and Advertisers' Chronicle for Bucks, Beds, Herts, Berks, Oxon, Northamptonshire. It also incorporated the Windsor and Eton Journal. The front page of the newspaper carried only advertisements, a tradition which continued for over one hundred years. Politically it was explicitly stated to be the only newspaper in the County of Buckingham which supported the Conservative Party, a position reinforced in its editorial when it came under new management in 1856. The price in that year was reduced to 4½d. In 1872 the Management of the Herald further reduced its price to 2d having taken over two local competitors, the Bucks Gazette and the Buckinghamshire, Bedfordshire and Hertfordshire Chronicle. By 1912 the Herald was selling at just 1d.

Historical copies of the Bucks Herald, dating back to 1833, are available to search and view in digitised form at The British Newspaper Archive.

== Present day ==
The paper covers local news, features, leisure and sport. The following facsimile shows front page spread of the paper in 1971. The sport section features extensive coverage of Aylesbury FC the town's football club.

In May 2012 the paper changed from broadsheet format to compact.

Alongside the main Bucks Herald paper, the group used to publish the free Bucks Advertiser every Friday but this closed in 2019.
