= Llangollen Motor Museum =

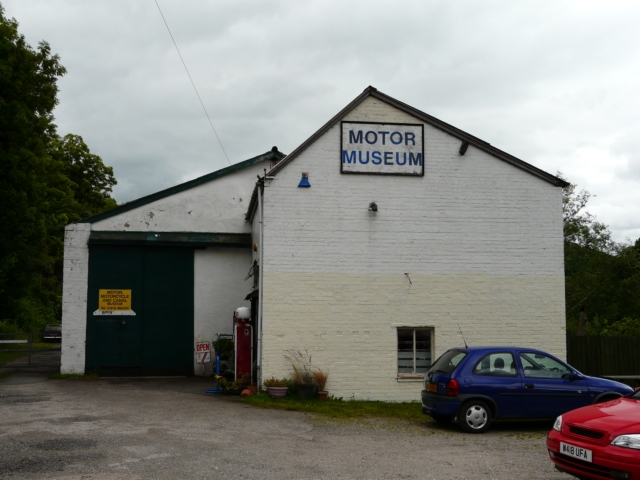
- Established: 1986; 40 years ago
- Location: Llangollen, Denbighshire, Wales
- Coordinates: 52.98388°N 3.18360°W
- Type: Transport museum
- Parking: On-site (free)
- Website: www.llangollenmotormuseum.co.uk

The Llangollen Motor Museum is a small museum and autojumble source near Llangollen, Wales established in 1986.

== Collection ==
The museum has a collection of motoring memorabilia which includes more than sixty cars and motorcycles.
