= Penbedw =

Country estate in Flintshire, Wales

Coordinates: 53.210°N 3.257°W

- Location within Flintshire
- OS grid reference: SJ 16145 68830
- Principal area: Flintshire
- Preserved county: Flintshire
- Country: Wales
- Sovereign state: United Kingdom
- Post town: Mold
- Postcode district: CH7 5RS
- Dialling code: 01352
- Police: North Wales
- Fire: North Wales
- Ambulance: Welsh

Penbedw is a country estate near Nannerch, Flintshire, Wales. Penbedw Hall was demolished by developers some time after 1969.

Its parks and gardens are listed as Grade II* in the Cadw/ICOMOS Register of Parks and Gardens of Special Historic Interest in Wales.
