= Caer Drewyn =

Hillfort in Denbighshire, Wales

Coordinates: 52°59′21″N 3°21′38″W

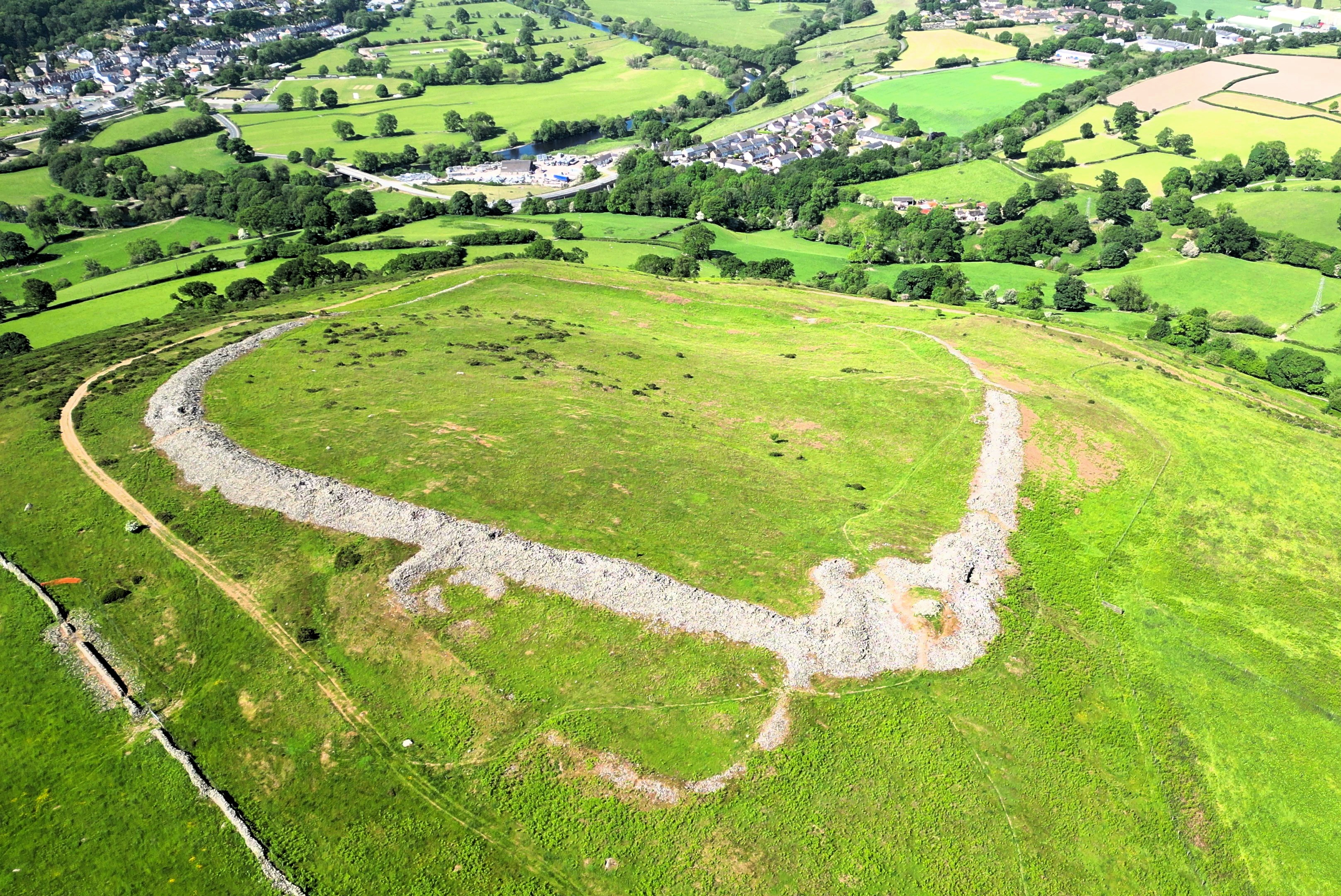
Caer Drewyn Iron Age Hillfort near Corwen. Aerial view from the east.

Caer Drewyn is an early Iron Age hillfort to the north of the town of Corwen, Denbighshire (Grid reference SJ 08769 44411). It has a large stone rampart with entrances on the west and north sides; there is a guard chamber within the north-east entrance, and it has a deep defensive ditch.

== The site ==
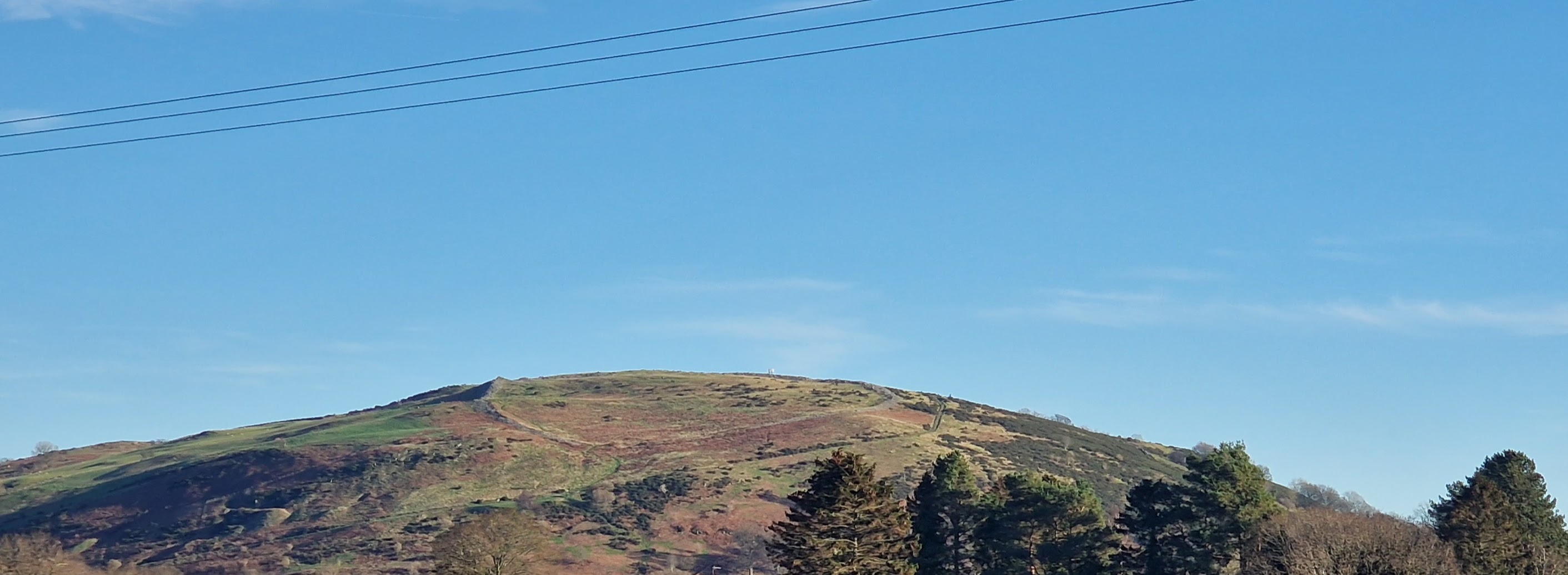
Caer Drewyn from the west

Caer Drewyn is the most southerly hillfort in the Clwydian Range and Dee Valley Area of Outstanding Natural Beauty. It is situated on the spur of a hill between Llangollen and Corwen, commanding the valley junction and fertile plain at the confluence of the River Dee and the River Alwen.

The main entrance is at the summit, and the site slopes to the west. The earliest structure was a small enclosure built against a natural rock outcrop. Today this structure is only visible as the remains of a grass-covered bank. A later, larger fortress was surrounded by a dry-stone wall, probably derived from the abundant scree in the area, and does not have the earthen ramparts of other local hillforts. It may have been built in sections by gangs; the eastern rampart shows lengths of smaller and of larger stones. The smooth outer face of the wall may have stood some 4.6 metres above its base, with a walkway 1.5 metres wide at the top. The rampart has collapsed and the smooth outer face of the wall is now visible in only one small spot.

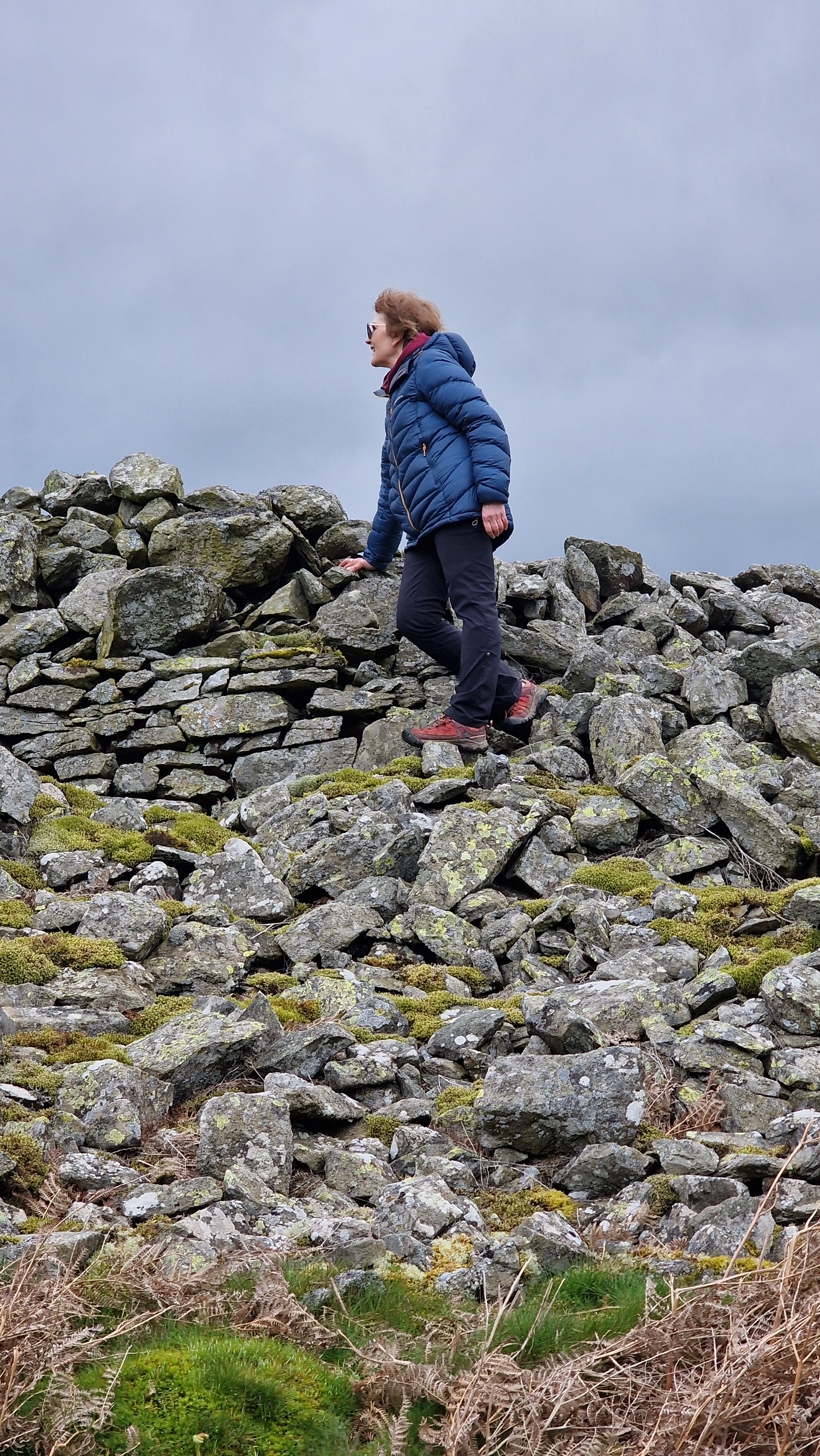
Caer Drewyn's wall is made of dry stone and has almost all collapsed; the original smooth face is visible only at this point

The area of the site is about three hectares. There are two in-turned entrances, one at the highest point, with the possible remains of a guardhouse beside it, and the other on the west side adjoining the remains of a rectangular building. There is a further enclosure outside that contains stone foundations of what may have been a hut platform.

== History ==
Caer Drewyn is an Iron Age fort dating back to about 500 BC, however it was in use as a defensive position long after this. Legend states that Owain Gwynedd occupied it while Henry II of England was invading Gwynedd in 1165 via a southerly route, and Owain Glyndŵr is believed to have gathered his troops here in 1400 after his followers proclaimed him Prince of Wales. The Welsh antiquarian Edward Lhuyd mentioned Caer Drewyn in the late seventeenth century as "a place where they kept their cattle in war time".

== See also ==
- List of hillforts in Wales
