= Iorwerth Goch ap Maredudd =

Prince and nobleman of Powys

Iorwerth Goch ap Maredudd (c. 1110 – c. 1171), a minor prince and nobleman of the Kingdom of Powys, was the illegitimate son of Maredudd ap Bleddyn and Cristin ferch Bledrus. The appellation "Goch", meaning red, probably referred to the colour of his hair.

Iorwerth married Maud de Manly, who gave him two sons, Gruffydd Fychan (c. 1150), and Hywel ap Iorwerth He had one brother, Hywel ap Maredudd, and two half-brothers, Madog ap Maredudd and Gruffydd ap Maredudd.

Iorwerth is known to have taken Tomen y Rhodwydd (castle of Yale) in 1157, situated in Llandegla, Denbighshire, Wales. The castle was initially built by Owain Gwynedd in 1149, and was burnt down by Iorwerth.

The Dream of Rhonabwy in the Mabinogion mentions Iorwerth:

"[T]his brother, Iorwerth son of Maredudd, was extremely agitated and distressed at seeing the honour and power that Madog enjoyed, while he himself had nothing. He sought out his comrades and foster-brothers for advice, and they decided that some of them should go to Madog and ask for maintenance for Iorwerth. Madog offered to make his brother head of his troops, with equal rank, honours, arms and horses..."
