= Ty Mawr Reservoir =

Reservoir in Wales

- Cronfa Ty Mawr (Welsh)
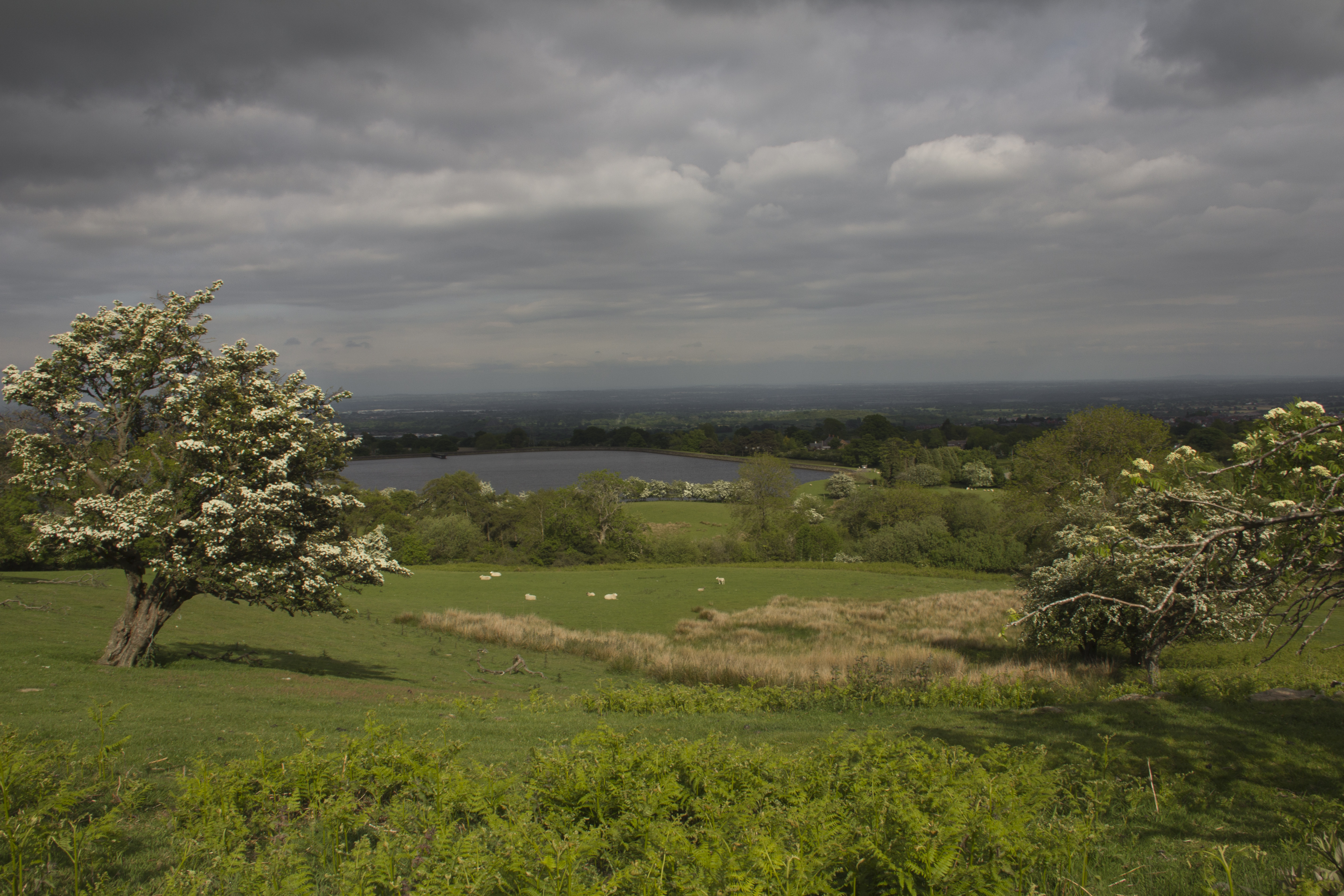
- Overlooking the reservoir

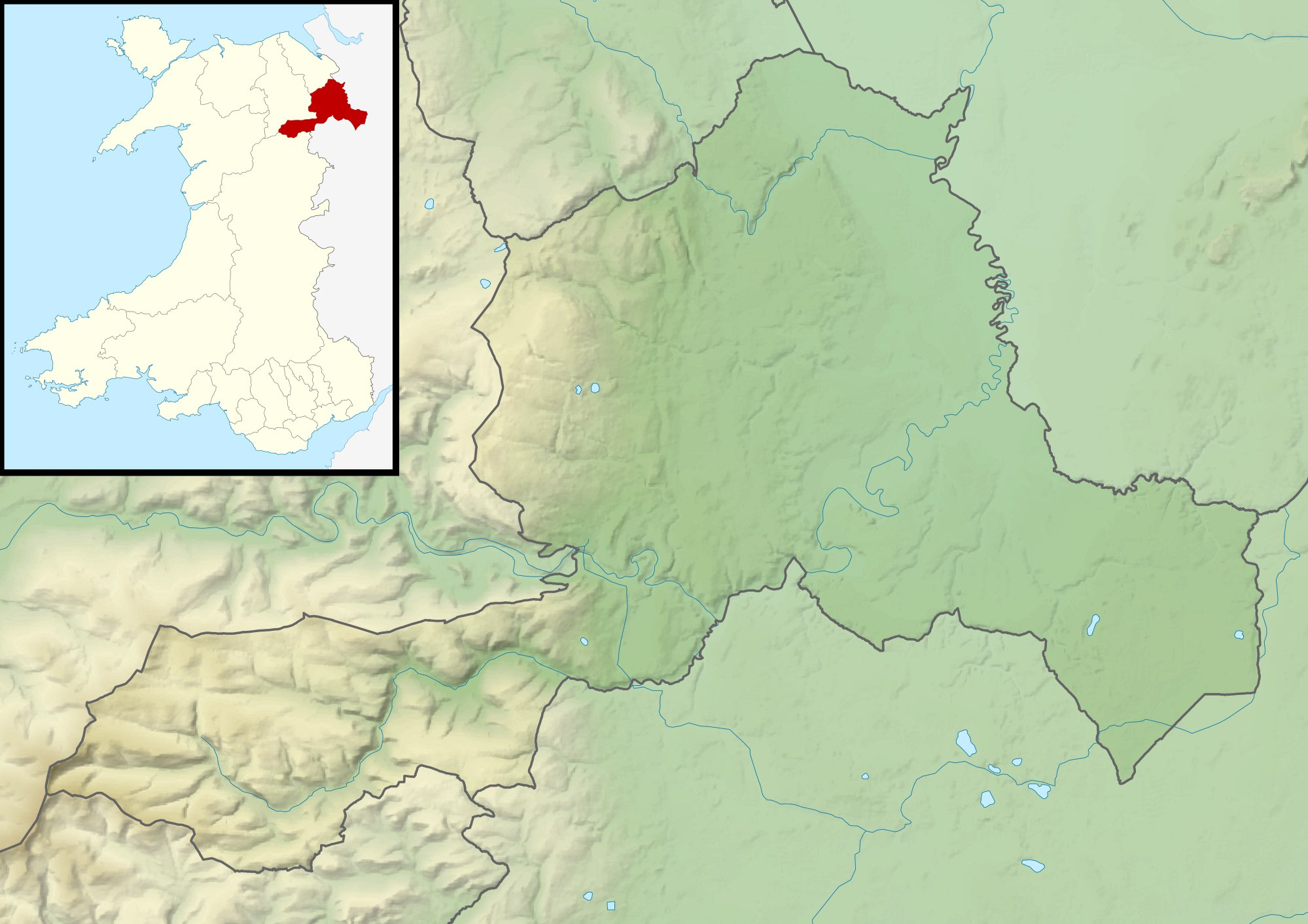
- Location in Wrexham County Borough
- Location: Wrexham, Wales
- Coordinates: 53.02420044°N 3.08161472°W
- Type: Artificial pumped-storage inland raw water reservoir
- Primary inflows: Esclusham Mountain, Eglwyseg Mountain and Cae Llwyd Reservoir
- River sources: Pentre-bychan Brook catchment
- Catchment area: 19 hectares (0.19 km^{2})
- Surface area: 8.6 hectares (86,000 m^{2})
- Average depth: 10 metres (33 ft) (mean)
- Water volume: 593,000 m^{3} (130,000,000 imp gal)
- Salinity: moderate alkalinity
- Shore length^{1}: 1.102 kilometres (0.685 mi)
- Surface elevation: 245 metres (804 ft)
- Settlements: Wrexham, Rhosllanerchrugog, Chirk
- ^{1} Shore length is not a well-defined measure.

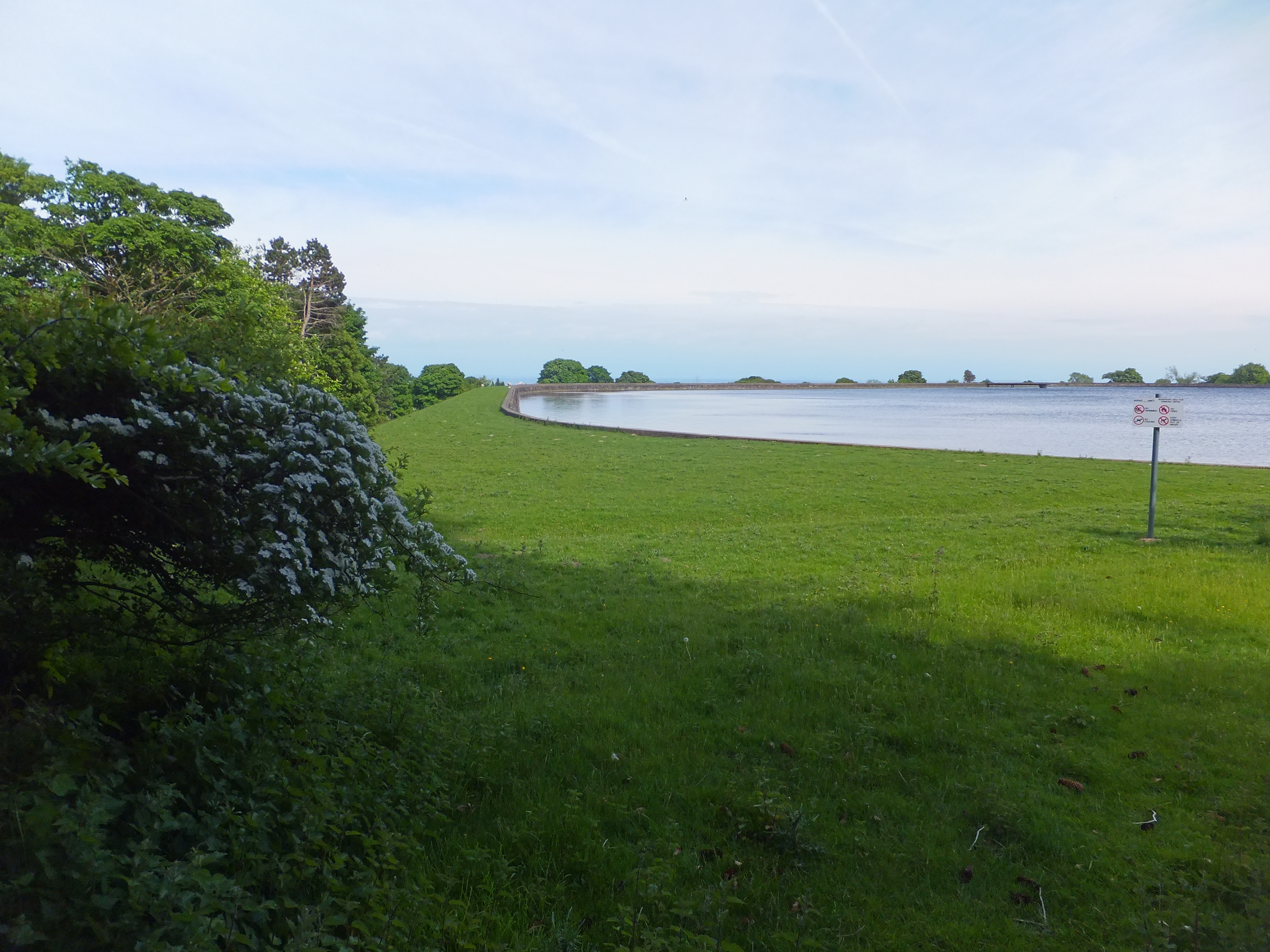
The dam wall of Ty Mawr Reservoir

Ty Mawr is a reservoir located between Llwyneinion and the Ruabon Moors in Wrexham County Borough, Wales. It is next to Cae Llwyd Reservoir.

== Description ==
The reservoir opened in 1908, and is operated today by Hafren Dyfrdwy on behalf of Severn Trent. It is 8.6 hectares (21 acres) in area, of moderate alkalinity, humic and a shallow reservoir of a mean depth of 10 metres (33 ft). It is part of a system of several small reservoirs including the Cae Llwyd Reservoir and Pen-y-Cae Reservoirs. The water of the lake is sourced from the drainage basin of the Pentre-bychan Brook and the Cae Llwyd Reservoir located at a higher elevation to the west of the reservoir. The catchment area of the lake is 19 hectares (47 acres). It holds the greatest continuous embankment length (600 metres (2,000 ft)) of any of the reservoirs operated by Severn Trent, and the embankment is made of a clay core. It can hold a capacity of 593,000 m^{3} (130 million imperial gallons).

The reservoir supplies Wrexham, Chester and surrounding areas, with it notably popular as a venue for anglers.

== See also ==
- List of lakes of Wales
