= Llandegla Forest =

Forest in Denbighshire, Wales

Llandegla Forest Coed Llandegla (Welsh)
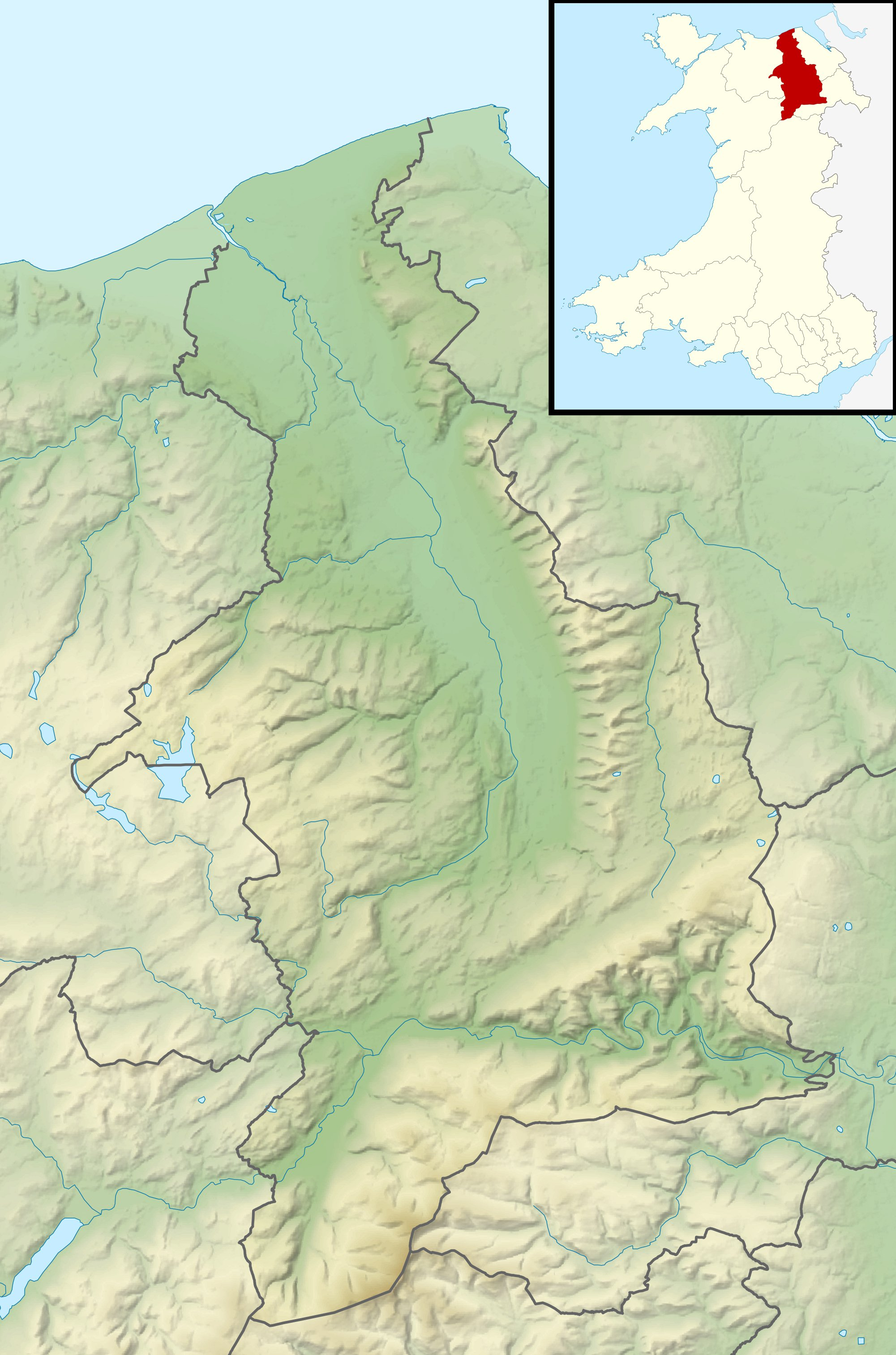
- Location within Denbighshire
- Interactive map of Llandegla Forest

Geography
- Location: Denbighshire, Wales
- Coordinates: 53.058°N 3.142°W

Llandegla Forest (Welsh: Coed Llandegla) is a forest of planted conifers covering 2.5 sq miles (6.5 km^{2}) in Denbighshire, north-east Wales. It is situated to the south-east of the village of Llandegla at the north-western edge of Ruabon Moors. Only 20 miles from Chester (in England) and 7 miles west of Wrexham, easily accessed via the A525 towards Ruthin. The forest is owned by UPM Tilhill and planting began in the early 1970s. The trees are mostly Sitka Spruce with a smaller area of larch.

In the middle of the forest lies Pendinas Reservoir (Welsh: Llyn Pendinas). It was constructed in the late 19th century by Brymbo Water Company to provide water for the local area. It is currently managed by Dee Valley Water.

The forest is used for a range of recreational activities including mountain-biking and walking. The Offa's Dyke Path, a long-distance footpath, passes through the forest. Fishing activity takes place at the reservoir.

The forest and adjacent moorland are important habitats for the Black Grouse which is declining in many parts of England and Wales. The birds are increasing here due to a programme of special land management. A bird hide has been constructed overlooking the birds' lekking to allow visitors to watch them.
