= Oernant Tramway =

Horse-drawn tramway in Wales

Oernant Tramway refers to a horse-drawn tramway which connected slate quarries located to the North-West of Llangollen with the Pentrefelin canal wharves at Llantysilio. It is simply referred to as "the tramway" in contemporary publications and appears to have been entirely owned by the Llangollen Slate and Slab Company. The tramway was built in the 1850s, reaching a maximum length approaching seven miles by 1857, and was used until about 1892. It had gravity-worked inclines, and was horse drawn on the level sections.

== History of the line ==
The arrival of the canal in Llantysilio in 1806 offered a way to transport slate from the slate mines in the hills above Llantysilio to most of England. There are records of slate being quarried at Oernant dating back to 1715, and in 1810 the freehold of the Oernant slate rocks came up for sale, stating that the slates produced there are equal if not superior for size and durability to any in the United Kingdom, and stating they were within just 2 miles of the Llangollen Canal. Transport to the canal was by road, initially by the early turnpike road which ran directly up the valley to the pass. In 1811 a new turnpike was created which followed the side of the valley and became known as the Horseshoe Pass. The Clogau Quarry (now known as the Berwyn Quarry) used an incline to bring slate down to this road.

Next to the slate wharves, on the canal at Pentrefelin, a slate and slab mill was built and was in operation in the late 1840s, and was refitted with better equipment in 1848. In 1849 agents were being appointed to sell the products of the Llangollen Slate and Flagstone Company which produced roofing slates, slate slabs, and flagstones (as used on the floor of Chester railway station). The slate and slab mill was water powered using water from the Dee, and was at a lower level than the canal wharves, with an overhead gantry to allow the movement of slate and products between the mill and the canal slate wharves.

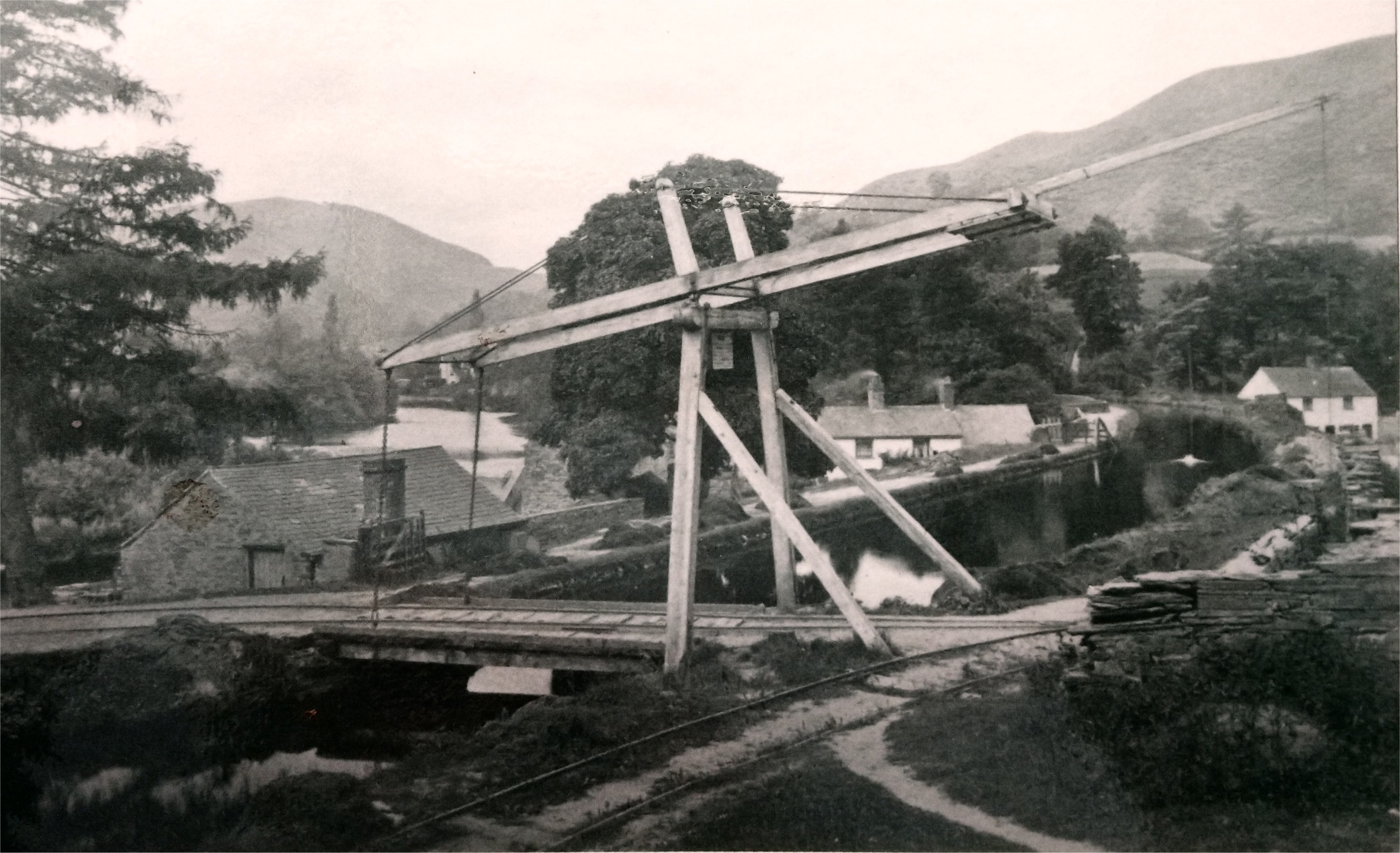
The bridge carrying the slate tramway over the Canal at Pentrefelin c1895

The tramway was designed by Henry Dennis for John Taylor & Son (owner of the slate and slab mill) around the time the slate and slab mill was built. This involved laying tracks either side of the canal at the slate wharves with a lifting bridge to allow the line to cross the canal. Building the tramway also involved building a viaduct (which still exists) over the Eglwyseg river, as well as the 650m long Maes-yr-ychen incline, and miles of nearly level track before it could connect with the base of the incline at the Clogau Quarry. The tramway was later continued from the top of the Clogau quarry incline to the pass over the mountain (close to the current road) where it swung West to connect to the Moel-y-Faen quarry, which it reached in 1857.

The extension of the line to Moel-y-Faen quarry may be due to the fact both quarries were merged under the ownership of the Llangollen Slab and Slate Company, which in 1855 announced it was supplying slab and slate from the quarries formerly worked separately by the Llangollen Flag-stone Company and the Llantysilio Slate Company. The latter company had been in financial trouble in 1854, but wasn't formerly put into liquidation until 1883, suggesting it struck a deal that retained some financial interest in the slate production.

At a meeting of the shareholders of the Llangollen Slab and Slate Company in 1860, the company was described as "under the management of the celebrated firm of Messrs John Taylor & Sons, the great mining engineers". Apart from a tour of the slate and slab works (which by now used both steam and water power) the shareholders visited each quarry travelling on "their own railway (5 miles long) in carriages temporarily fitted for the occasion". This shows the railway was wholly owned by the Llangollen Slab and Slate Company, and the ability to carry the shareholders suggests it may have had some capacity for carrying workmen as well as slate.

When it was proposed to build a standard gauge railway to Llangollen in 1859, a strong case was made to continue the line for a further 2 miles to provide access to the slate works at Pentrefelin. At this time the slate tramway was described as approaching 7 miles in length. The railway reached Llangollen in 1862, and construction was continued towards Corwen with a siding laid to the Pentrefelin Slate Mill.

The 1860s and 1870s were the heyday for slate production in the area, with many thousands of tons shipped out each year and agents operating all around the country. However in the late 1870s a global economic downturn known as the Long Depression impacted the business. In 1883 the directors provisionally resolved to wind up operations, however this did not occur, but in the years that followed workers suffered from shorter hours and back pay being owed for many weeks.

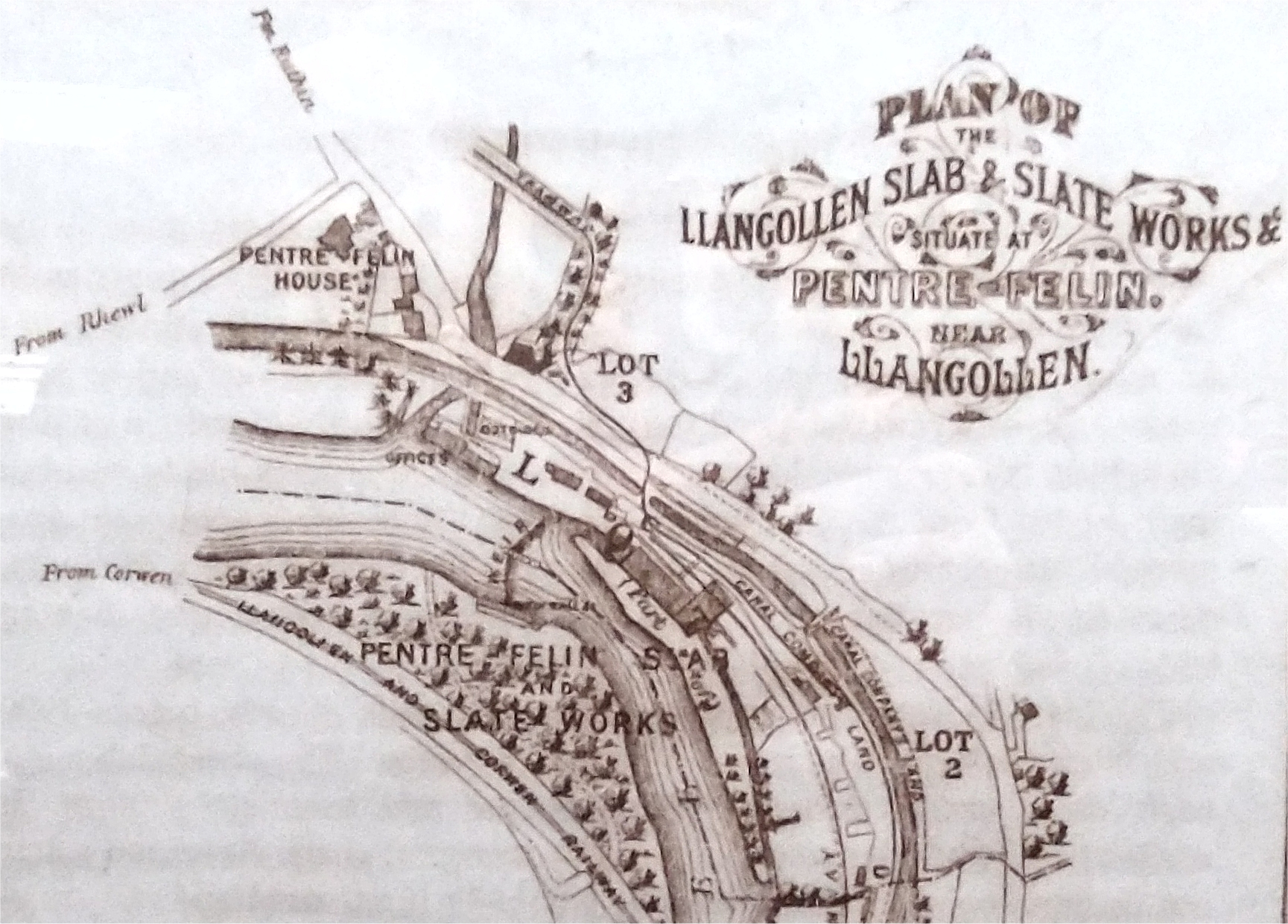
A plan made of Pentrefelin Slab and Slate Works prior to sale in 1897

In November 1889 there was a strike at Moel-y-Faen Quarry and Pentrefelin in a dispute about pay, and in 1890 it was reported to the Llangollen District Highway Board that the Maesynychain incline was in a dangerous state, and it was resolved to draw this to the attention of the Llangollen Slate and Slab Company. This appears indicative of the perilous state of the finances of the Llangollen Slab and Slate Company, as in March 1892 the directors decided to wind up the company and a sale was announced by order of the liquidator of the following :

- The lease of the land upon which stands the Moel-y-Faen Slate Quarry
- The lease of the land upon which stands the Clogau Slab and Flagstone Quarry
- The Llangollen Slate and Slab Works at Pentrefelin
- Pentrefelin House and Farm, Maes yr Ychan Farm, Tai Newyddion Cottages
- The company's interest and rights in tramways, sidings, wharves, etc
- The valuable plant at the foregoing quarries and works.

For whatever reason the works at Pentrefelin did not sell in 1892 and in September 1897 the company's Slate and Slab works complete with machinery, buildings, land and cottages were re-auctiond and sold under order of the liquidator to a Mr W.H.Bolton of Surbiton for £1275.

The tramway probably fell out of use following the sale of the quarries in 1892. Ordnance survey maps updated in 1898 show much of the tramway in situ, though the Llangollen map from 1898 shows the slate works as disused and no longer shows the tramroad sidings along the canal wharves. The 1910 ordnance survey shows most of the track to have been lifted.

== Accidents and incidents ==
There was a fatality at Pentrefelin in 1867, when John Jones was unloading the trollies at Penterfelin Slab and Slate Works. In the inquest the unloading of the wagons that come from the quarries was described, and the fact they didn't brake the trollies as the place was quite level. In this instance the trolley moved allowing a 3 cwt flagstone to tip and injure the man, who died some time later. It was said the deceased had been working at Pentrefelin for some 21 years, suggesting the works was there as early as 1846.

There was another death at Pentrefelin Slate Works in 1877, when John Williams (foreman) was killed when the beam of the travelling crane operating on the wharf snapped. There being no obvious defect in the beam it was thought that a jerk caused by a small stone may have caused the beam failure.

== Oernant Tramway Post ==
A web page has claimed that stamps were issued for the carriage of mail by the tramway, however it has a disclaimer that 'none of this may be true', which appears to be the case due to the lack of supporting evidence. Furthermore the tramway, quarries, and slab and slate works were all owned by the same company so it seems unlikely they would have created and issued stamps to themselves for the carriage of their own letters.

== See Also ==
The Deeside Tramway further up the valley at Glyndyfrdwy was built about the same date as the main line railway, and in the next valley the Glyn Valley Tramway was built which served several quarries including Cambrian and Wynne Slate quarries. For an overview of slate railways see British narrow-gauge slate railways.
