= Craig y Forwyn =

Craig y Forwyn may refer to:

- Craig y Forwyn (Conwy), a limestone crag near the village of Llanddulas in Wales
- Craig y Forwyn (Denbighshire), a limestone crag near the town of Llangollen in Wales
