= World's End, Denbighshire =

Narrow vale in Denbighshire, Wales

Coordinates: 53°1′19″N 3°8′43″W

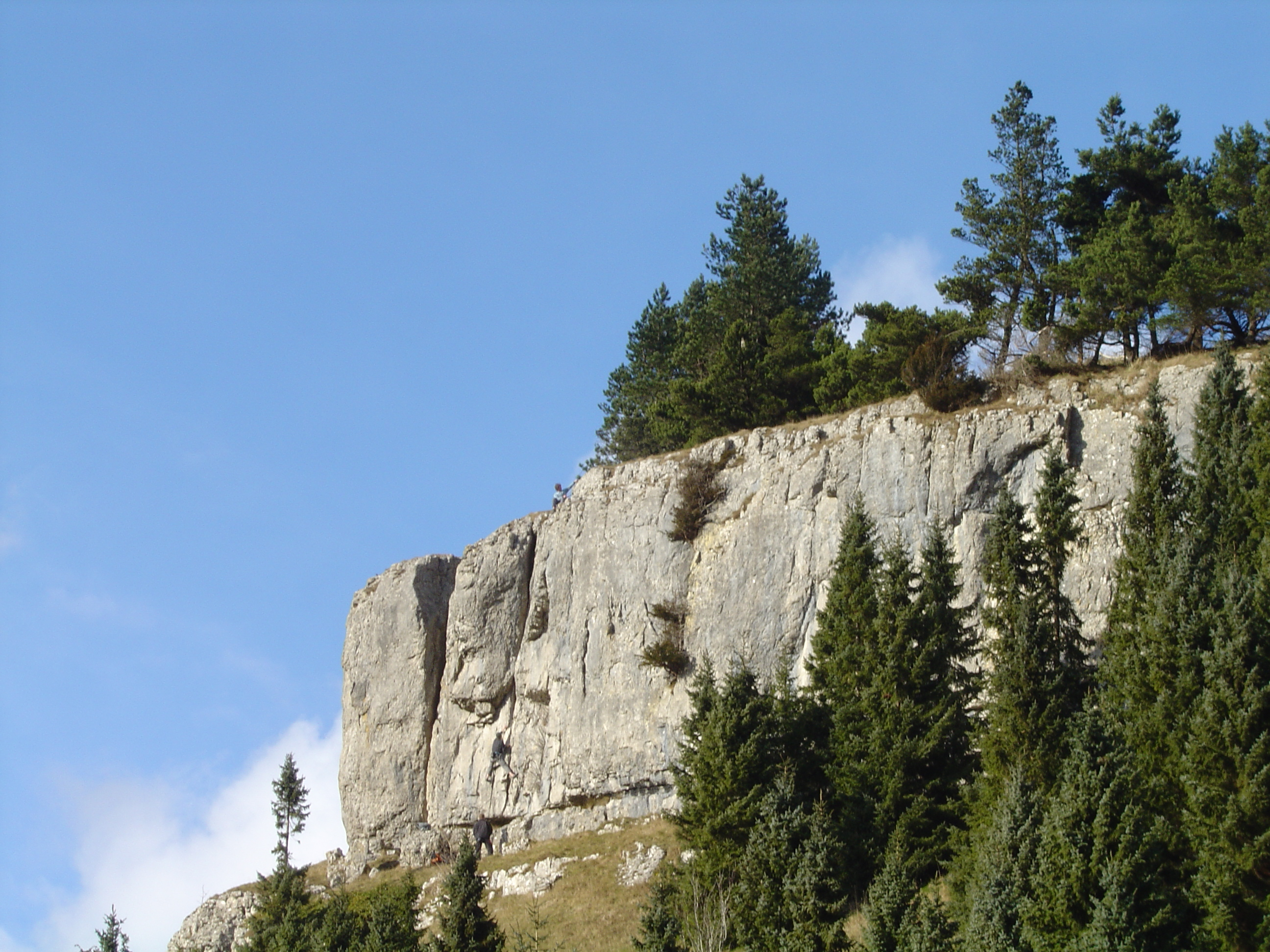
Cliffs at World's End

World's End (Welsh: Pen Draw'r Byd) is a narrow vale located between Wrexham and Llangollen in Denbighshire, Wales. It lies at the head of the Eglwyseg Valley, enclosed by the cliffs of Craig y Forwyn, Craig y Cythraul, and Craig yr Adar.

The area is popular with walkers, cyclists and tourists. The Offa's Dyke Path passes through World's End.

World's End lies on a single track road from the small village of Minera near Wrexham, which crosses Esclusham Mountain and the Ruabon Moors to a public car park at the top of the Eglwyseg valley. The road crosses the Eglwyseg River by a ford, then goes on towards Pentre Dŵr, under the Horseshoe Pass, leading eventually to Llangollen or onto the Panorama in Trevor.

Near World’s End is the manor house Plas Ucha yn Eglwyseg, built in 1563. It was for a time the home of John Jones Maesygarnedd, one of the signatories of the death warrant for Charles I of England. The building is said to stand on the site of a hunting lodge of Owain ap Cadwgan, prince of Powys, where Owain carried Nest (daughter of Rhys ap Tewdwr) when he stole her away from her husband Gerald de Windsor in 1109.

There are a number of small limekilns at World's End, probably dating from the later 18th- or early 19th-century, and there are also traces of a short-lived lead and silver mine in operation between the 1860s and 1880s.
