= Cae Llwyd Reservoir =

Reservoir in Wales

- Cronfa Cae Llwyd (Welsh)
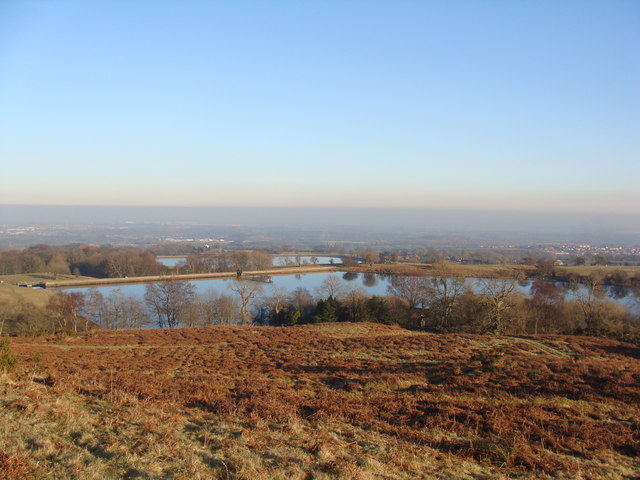
- Cae Llwyd in the foreground, with Ty Mawr in the background.

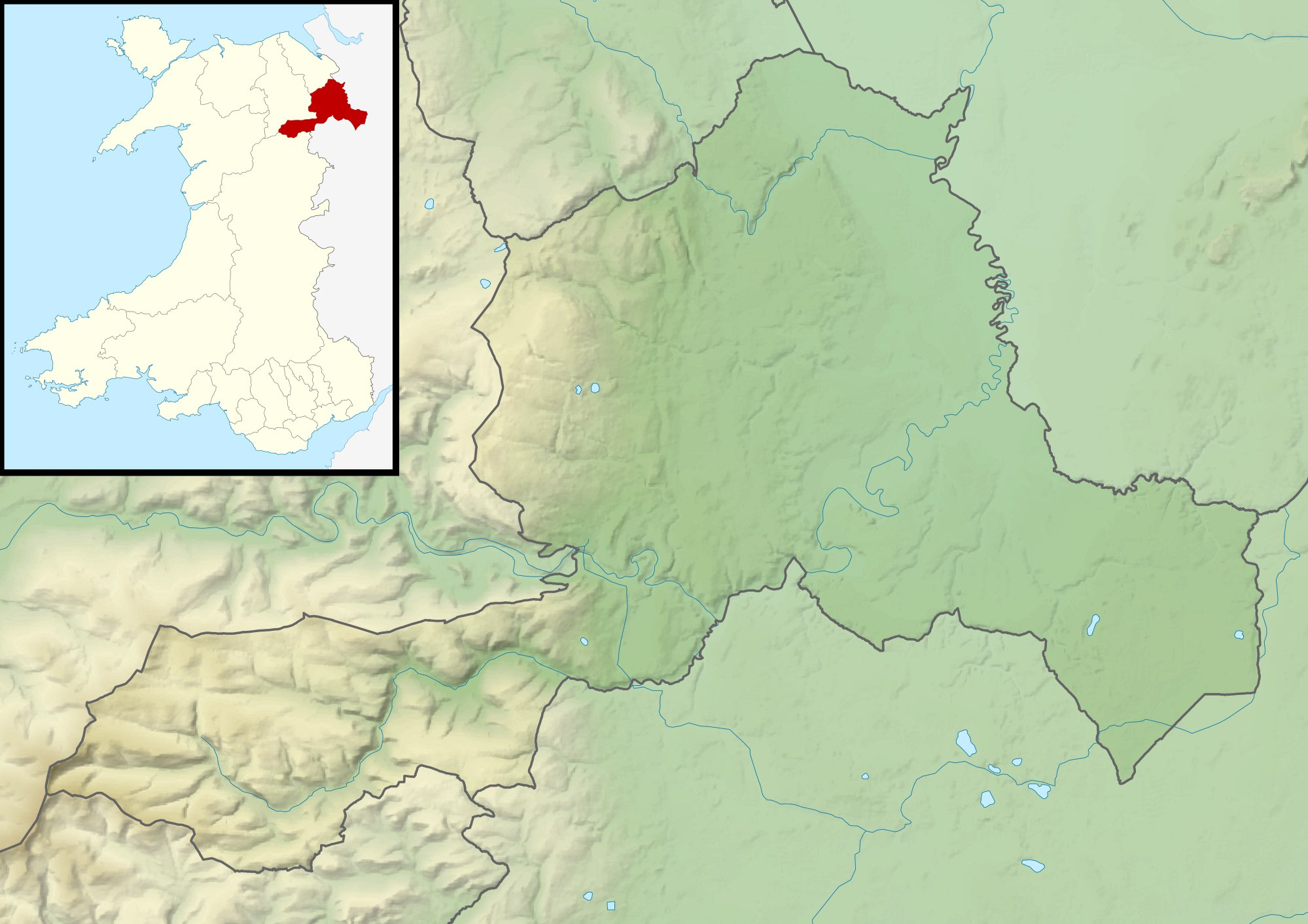
- Location in Wrexham County Borough
- Location: Wrexham, Wales
- Coordinates: 53.023°N 3.090°W
- Type: Inland Water reservoir
- Built: 1878
- Water volume: 177,000 m^{3} (39,000,000 imp gal)
- Settlements: Wrexham, Rhosllanerchrugog, Chirk

Cae Llwyd is a reservoir located between Llwyneinion and the Ruabon Moors in Wrexham County Borough, Wales.

== Description ==
The reservoir is an impounded lake holding raw water. It is dammed with a soil embankment consisting of a puddle clay core. It rises up to 15 metres (49 ft), holds a total water capacity of 177,000 m^{3} (39,000,000 imp gal).

The contract to build the reservoir was signed in 1875, with a cost of 605565. The plans are described to be "commendably brief", only containing seven items. One of the drawings was later found in 1984 to have been drawn on the back of a print for various Mersey crossing proposals including a suspension bridge and two tunnels. The reservoir was constructed in 1878 by the Wrexham Waterworks Company, it is operated by Hafren Dyfrdwy on behalf of Severn Trent.

The reservoir is part of the Ty Mawr/Cae Llwyd/Pen-y-Cae Reservoir System, one of the two reservoir systems by Hafren Dyfrdwy to supply the Wrexham Resource Zone.

There is a Scouting site located next to the reservoir.

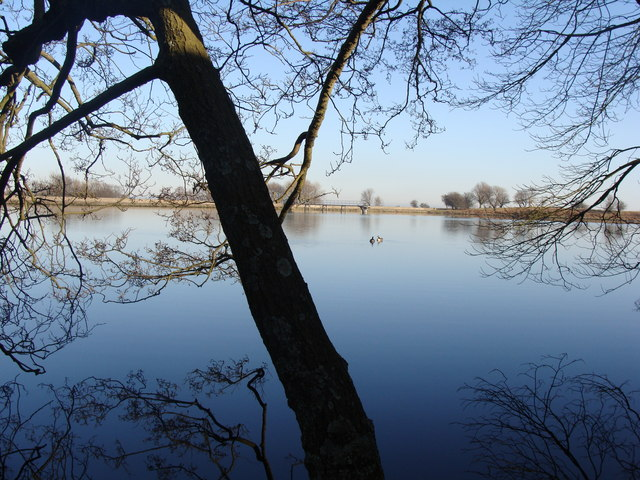
The reservoir in winter

== See also ==
- List of lakes of Wales
