= Craig y Forwyn (Denbighshire) =

Cliff near Llangollen, Denbighshire, Wales

Coordinates: 53.0223°N 3.1439°W

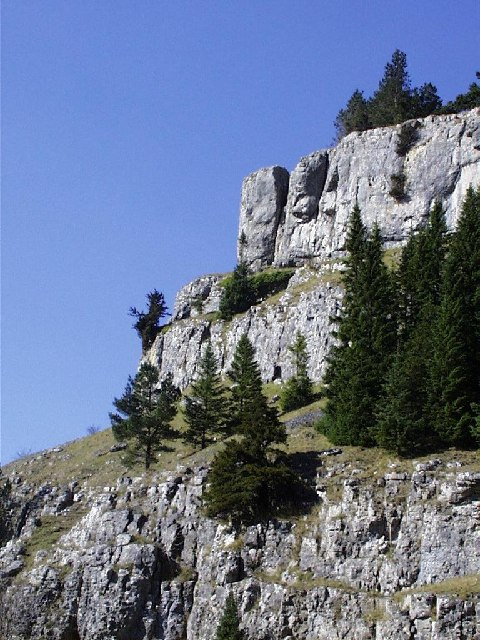
Craig y Forwyn

Craig y Forwyn ("Maiden's Crag") is a crag that encloses the northern side of World's End, near the town of Llangollen in Denbighshire, Wales. It is part of the limestone escarpment that separates the Eglwyseg Valley from the higher Ruabon Moors and, along with nearby Craig Arthur, is a popular site for rock climbing. Evidence of lead and silver mining is found just to the west. The Offa's Dyke Path runs along its foot.

The crag is mentioned in George Borrow's Wild Wales. Borrow, while walking from Llangollen to Wrexham, notices "an enormous crag of a strange form rising to the very heavens". When a local tells him that it is called Craig y Forwyn, he asks about the origin of the name, receiving the response, "I do not know sir; some people say that it is called so because its head is like that of a woman, others because a young girl in love leaped from the top of it and was killed."
