= Henry Dennis (industrialist) =

- Born: 1825; Bodmin, Cornwall, United Kingdom
- Died: June 24, 1906 (aged 80–81); Bodmin, United Kingdom
- Occupation: Engineer
- Known for: Manager of mining and railway companies in North Wales
- Children: 3, Henry Dyke Dennis, Walter Pen Dennis, and Susan Dennis

Henry Dennis (1825–24 June 1906) was a British civil engineer. He was born and died in Bodmin, Cornwall but spent much of his working life in North Wales where he was involved in railways and coal mines, usually as managing director.

He was an alderman, and a justice of the peace, and sat on several professional bodies, including being president of the Mining Association of Great Britain.

== Early life ==
Dennis was born in Bodmin, and after leaving school was articled to the borough surveyor.

== Career ==
At the conclusion of his training he joined the Cornwall Railway which at the time was still at the planning stage. He was engaged by the mining engineers John Taylor & Son (John Taylor had for a long time been a key figure in the Cornish mining industry and had built the Redruth and Chasewater Railway to move ore from his mines to the port of Devoran).

Around 1850 John Taylor sent Dennis to North Wales to oversee the design and construction of the Oernant Tramway. In the early 1850s he spent some time in Spain, where John Taylor & Son had three lucrative lead mining projects (the Linares Lead Mining Co, The Fortuna Co, and the Allaminos Co), before returning to North Wales where he was involved with several of John Taylor's companies before setting himself up with his brother-in-law as surveyors and mining engineers.

=== Mining interests ===
Dennis' mining interests were extensive, the early appointments arising from his employment by John Taylor & Son including:

- Managing director of the Bryn-yr-Owen colliery at Ruabon from 1858 to 1867 (and a partner in the colliery company headed by John Taylor & Son) The new manager was Mr H.H.Oakes.
- Managing director of the Minera Mining Company (a lead mining company formed by John Taylor & Son in 1845)
- Managing director of the Snailbeach lead mine, Shropshire
- Chairman and managing director of the Westminster Colliery
- Manager of the Wrexham and Acton Colliery (also known as Rhosddu colliery)
- Managing director of the Ruabon Coal and Coke company (which he formed in 1865 along with Henry Robertson and Sir Daniel Gooch). This company opened the Hafod Colliery in 1867 (closed down in 1968).

He was also managing director of the Terra Cotta company, the Hafod Brickworks (renamed Dennis Ruabon Ltd from 1878), and director or works engineer for several gas and water companies including Ruabon Water Works, Brymbo Water Works, Rhos Gas Works, and Barmouth Gas Works.

=== Railway interests ===
Dennis' railway interest largely focussed on using minor railways to move materials from mines in remote locations to the main transport networks. His involvement in the design of the Oernant Tramway (which moved slate from quarries to the slate mills at Llantisilio) was followed by becoming managing director of the Glyn Valley Tramway Company (which served many quarries in the valley as well as providing a passenger service), and chairman and managing director of the Snailbeach District Railway Company, which served both passengers and the lead mines. He was also a director of the Wrexham District Tramways Company.

=== Other interests ===
Dennis was for a long time chairman of the North Wales Coalowners Association, and was a member of the Institution of Civil Engineers. During the 1893 Miners' Strike, Dennis was selected to represent the North Wales colliery proprietors at the coal miners and owners conference in London headed by Lord Rosebery. In 1904 he was elected president of the Mining Association of Great Britain.

He was elected one of the first aldermen on the newly formed (1889) Denbighshire County Council, and was a justice of the peace for the Ruabon bench.

Dennis was also a keen farmer, and a prominent breeder of Shropshire sheep, winning many prizes at various shows.

== Personal life, death ==
He had three children, two sons, Henry Dyke Dennis and Walter Pen Dennis, and a daughter, Susan.

Active until his death, Dennis travelled back to Bodmin in 1906 where he became ill and died within a few days. A greatly respected man, the funeral procession of Dennis from New Hall, Ruabon to Wrexham in 1906 had the largest attendance ever seen in the district, with nearly 100 carriages and 6,000 attendees. He was buried in Wrexham Cemetery.
