= Tomen y Rhodwydd =

Motte and bailey castle in Denbighshire, Wales

- south-west of Llandegla, Denbighshire in Wales, United Kingdom
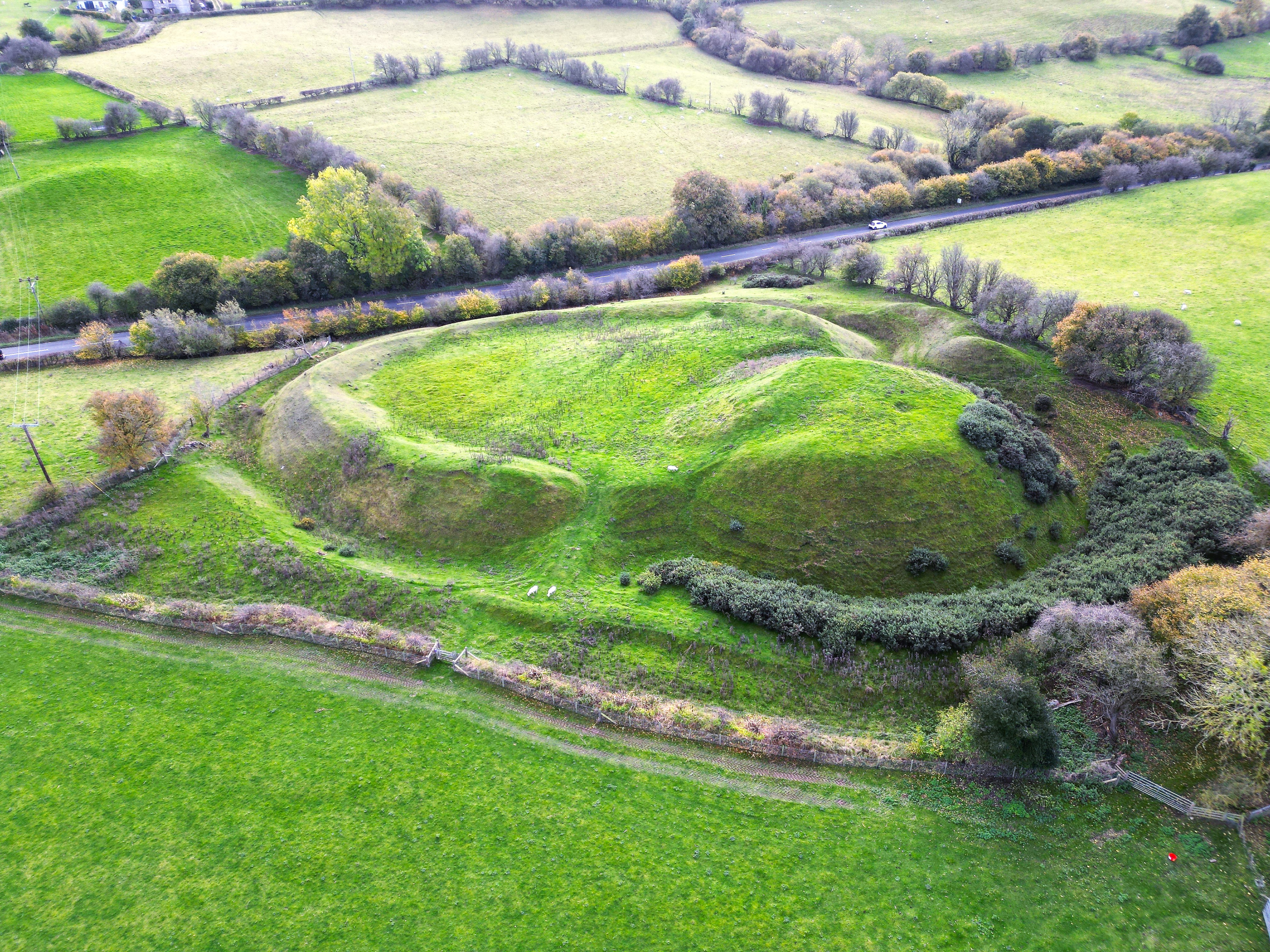

Site information
- Type: motte-and-bailey castle
- Owner: Private
- Open to the public: No

Location
- Coordinates: 53.0554°N 3.2295°W
- Grid reference: SJ1769651606

Site history
- Built: 1149

Tomen y Rhodwydd is a motte-and-bailey castle built by Owain Gwynedd to protect the borders of Gwynedd Is Conwy. It stands in an area of fields and low hills to the south of Llandegla-yn-Iâl (today's south-east Denbighshire), Wales.

This, it seems, was the 'Castell yn Iâl' (castle of Yale) built by Owain Gwynedd in 1149, according to the Chronicle of the Princes, when he seized the hundred of Ial from the kings of Powys. That first castle stood until 1157 when it was burnt down by Iorwerth Goch ap Maredudd (Iorwerth Goch) of Powys following a raid by Henry II of England on Gwynedd. There is another record in an English document from 1212 which refers to the repair of 'Yale castle', but it is likely that another castle in the same area is meant, namely Tomen y Faerdre, 3 miles down the valley near Llanarmon-yn-Iâl.

An aerial view of Castell y Rhodwydd

The castle stands on private land but can be seen from the A525 road between Wrexham and Ruthin, about a mile and a half south-west of Llandegla.
