= Hafren Dyfrdwy =

Water company of England and Wales

Hafren Dyfrdwy Cyfyngedig
- Formerly: Chester Waterworks plc (13 March 1998); Dee Valley Water plc (1998–2018); Hafren Dyfrdwy Limited (June–November 2018); Dee Valley Water Limited (January–June 2018)
- Type: Limited company
- Industry: Water industry
- Predecessor: Dee Valley Water; Severn Trent
- Founded: 1 July 2018; 8 years ago
- Headquarters: Rhostyllen, Wrexham, Wales
- Area served: North East Wales
- Products: Drinking water; Recycled wastewater
- Parent: Severn Trent plc (LSE: STW)
- Website: hdcymru.co.uk

Hafren Dyfrdwy Cyfyngedig (Welsh for 'Severn Dee Limited', after the two main rivers in its region, plus the Welsh incorporation type) is a water company providing water and wastewater treatment services, operating in north east and mid Wales. It provides water only in Wrexham and parts of Denbighshire and Flintshire and both water and wastewater in northern Powys. It previously served north east Wales and parts of North West England as Dee Valley Water until June 2018. Its parent entity, Dee Valley Group plc had shares listed on the FTSE Fledgling Index on the London Stock Exchange, but was purchased by Severn Trent in February 2017.

The company is regulated under the Water Industry Act 1991.

On 1 July 2018, all of the water service area of Dee Valley Water and Severn Trent lying in Wales became part of the Dee Valley Water company, which was granted a new wastewater appointment and renamed as Hafren Dyfrdwy (Welsh for 'Severn Dee'). The remainder of Dee Valley Water, lying in England (at Chester), was taken over by sister company Severn Trent Water.

== History ==
=== Wrexham Waterworks Company ===
After Wrexham achieved its charter of incorporation in 1857, attentions turned to a proper water supply for the then town, as residents relied on wells and the River Gwenfro for their water supply, which contained trade effluence from the many breweries, leatherworks and brickworks present. The Wrexham Waterworks Company was established by the Wrexham Waterworks Act 1864 (27 & 28 Vict. c. lxxxv) with the aim of pumping water from nearby Pentrebychan, west enough of the town to not be influenced by pollution. The first works, opened in the same year, were primitive, with only a reservoir and slow sand filter for water treatment, these were made obsolete by the construction of an impounding reservoir further upstream in 1878, this reservoir, named Cae Llwyd, has a capacity of 42,000 thousand m^{3} (9,200 million imp gal).

In 1904, demand had again increased, and the company now supplied parts of Cheshire as well as Wrexham. To meet this increased demand, a new, larger reservoir was built, named Ty Mawr, which opened in 1907. The same act of Parliament that allowed the construction also authorised the name change of Wrexham Waterworks Company to the Wrexham and East Denbighshire Water Company. The construction of these works also enabled the construction and expansion of the treatment works at Legacy in 1921, as well as the construction of Legacy water tower by 1934. Pumps had also been installed at disused mines, notably at Minera Lead Mines, to extract water in times of drought.

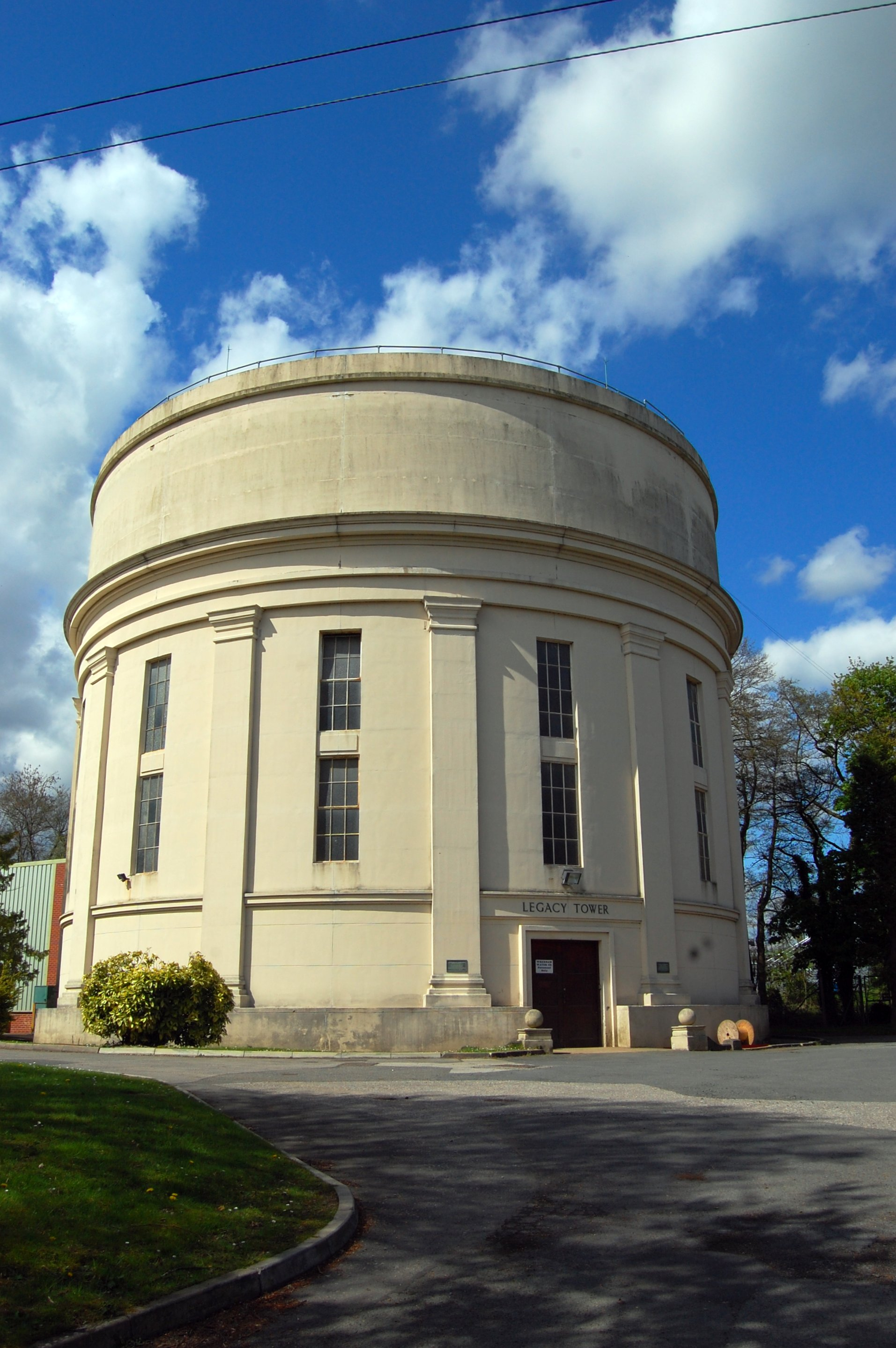
Legacy Water Tower

During the 1950s, there was a period of consolidation. The company acquired several other local water supply companies, including those at nearby Ruabon and Brymbo, as well as undertakings previously run by district councils. The company also took possession of the large water extraction works at Sesswick built by the Ministry of Works to supply ROF Wrexham during World War II. In 1983, the expansion of the company dictated that larger offices were required. The headquarters at Egerton Street were sold and the company moved to new, purpose-built offices at Packsaddle, Rhostyllen.

=== Chester Waterworks Company ===
A water supply system has been present in Chester since Roman times with water taken from the River Dee and small local sources. There certainly appears to have been a well at Christleton to the east of the city in the 14th century and by 1537 records reveal a conduit being built from Broughton to convey water into the city.

The City of Chester Waterworks Company was established by the Chester Water Act 1826 (7 Geo. 4. c. cx), inheriting an intake at the causeway – now called Chester Weir. The Chester Weir intake was used until 2015.

The Chester Waterworks Company (Constitution and Regulation) Order 1998 (SI 1998/281) reorganised the Chester Waterworks Company into Chester Waterworks plc.

=== Merger ===
In 1994, the Wrexham and East Denbighshire Water Company (Constitution and Regulation) Order 1994 (SI 1994/2205) reorganised the Wrexham and East Denbighshire Water Company into Wrexham Water plc, and the new parent company Dee Valley Group was established to act as a holding company to the new company.

In 1997, the Dee Valley Group purchased Chester Waterworks, and over the next year, combined operations from both entities into Dee Valley Water. In 2002, Dee Valley Group was listed on the London Stock Exchange with the ticker code DVW.

=== Montgomeryshire area ===
In 1974 the functions of Montgomeryshire Water Board and local authority wastewater functions in Montgomeryshire became part of Severn Trent Water Authority. Upon privatisation in 1989 these were transferred to the licensed water and sewerage company Severn Trent Water. This area is now part of Powys.

=== 2016 takeover bids ===
In October 2016 the board of Dee Valley Water announced that they had agreed a takeover of the company by Ancala Fornia Limited. This offer would have allowed the company to remain as an independent water company. Three weeks later the board announced that they were now recommending a 10% higher offer from Severn Trent Water. Several local MPs expressed concern about the potential impact on jobs and local services arising from the proposed Severn Trent takeover. Ancala subsequently increased their offer to 1p per share above Severn Trent, and two days later Severn Trent further increased their offer by a further 7.3%. The takeover by Severn Trent was completed in February 2017.
