= Llandegla =

Village in Denbighshire, Wales

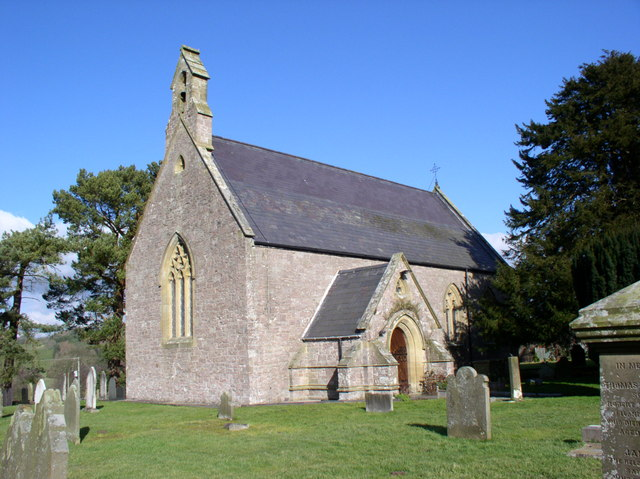
- Church dedicated to St. Tecla

- Location within Denbighshire
- Population: 567 (2011)
- OS grid reference: SJ196524
- Community: Llandegla
- Principal area: Denbighshire
- Preserved county: Clwyd
- Country: Wales
- Sovereign state: United Kingdom
- Post town: Wrexham
- Postcode district: LL11
- Dialling code: 01978
- Police: North Wales
- Fire: North Wales
- Ambulance: Welsh
- UK Parliament: Clwyd East
- Senedd Cymru – Welsh Parliament: Clwyd West
- List of places UK Wales Denbighshire 53.063°N 3.200°W Map of the community

Llandegla (Welsh pronunciation) or Llandegla-yn-Iâl (Welsh pronunciation) is a village and community in the county of Denbighshire in Wales. In the 2011 census, the community had a population of 567.

== Name ==
The village's name is Welsh for the "Parish of Saint Tecla", which honours the patron saint of the parish church. This was most probably originally dedicated to a Welsh virgin named Tegla Forwyn ("Thecla the Virgin") – not the more famous Thecla who is known as "Tecla" in several Romance languages. However, the Welsh saint is obscure and Llandegla's Patronal Festival has been held on the feast of the foreign saint since at least the early 20th century.

Llandegla-yn-Iâl distinguishes the community as "St Tegla's in Yale". Yale's own name meant the "fertile hill country"; it was a Welsh commote and English hundred. The estate of Plas yn Iâl in the village was the seat of the Iâl family, whose most well-known member is Elihu Yale, a governor of the British East India Company. Elihu made a substantial gift towards the founding of an educational institution in New Haven, Connecticut (United States). This sponsorship led to the college becoming known as Yale College and later Yale University. Yale is buried in nearby Wrexham.

== Location ==
Llandegla is located 253 m (830 ft) above sea level in the upper valley of the River Alyn just off the A525 road between Ruthin and Wrexham. The boundaries of the community include both the village of Llandegla itself and the neighbouring village of Pen-y-stryt. Notably the village boundary includes Llandegla Forest, or Coed Llandegla, a famous mountain biking centre, which attracts tens of thousands of visitors every year. To the east rises the Nant-y-Ffrith stream.

== History ==
St Tecla's church is likely to have been an early-mediaeval foundation, and by the 13th century was recorded as a chapelry of Valle Crucis Abbey. The fabric of the building was, however, heavily rebuilt in 1866, probably to a design by John Gibson.

The village was located on one of the main drovers' roads from the north-west coast of Wales to the markets of England, and the cattle trade was central to its economy. Thomas Pennant wrote that it was "noted for its vast fairs for black cattle", and there were formerly several inns in the village to cater for the drovers and cattle-dealers. George Borrow, in his travelogue Wild Wales, recorded meeting a hog-dealer on the road above Eglwyseg taking a large herd of pigs across the mountain from "Llandeglo" towards Wrexham.

As the droving trade tailed off in the later 19th century, due to the construction of the railways, many of Llandegla's residents worked in quarrying.

== Local customs and traditions ==
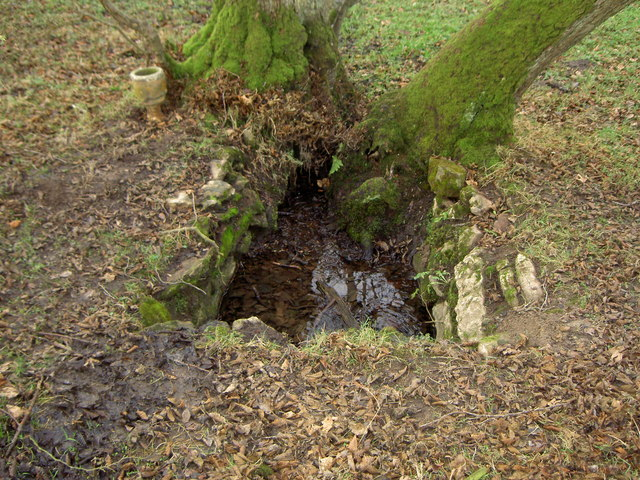
St Tecla's well. Its use was discouraged by the church after the 19th century

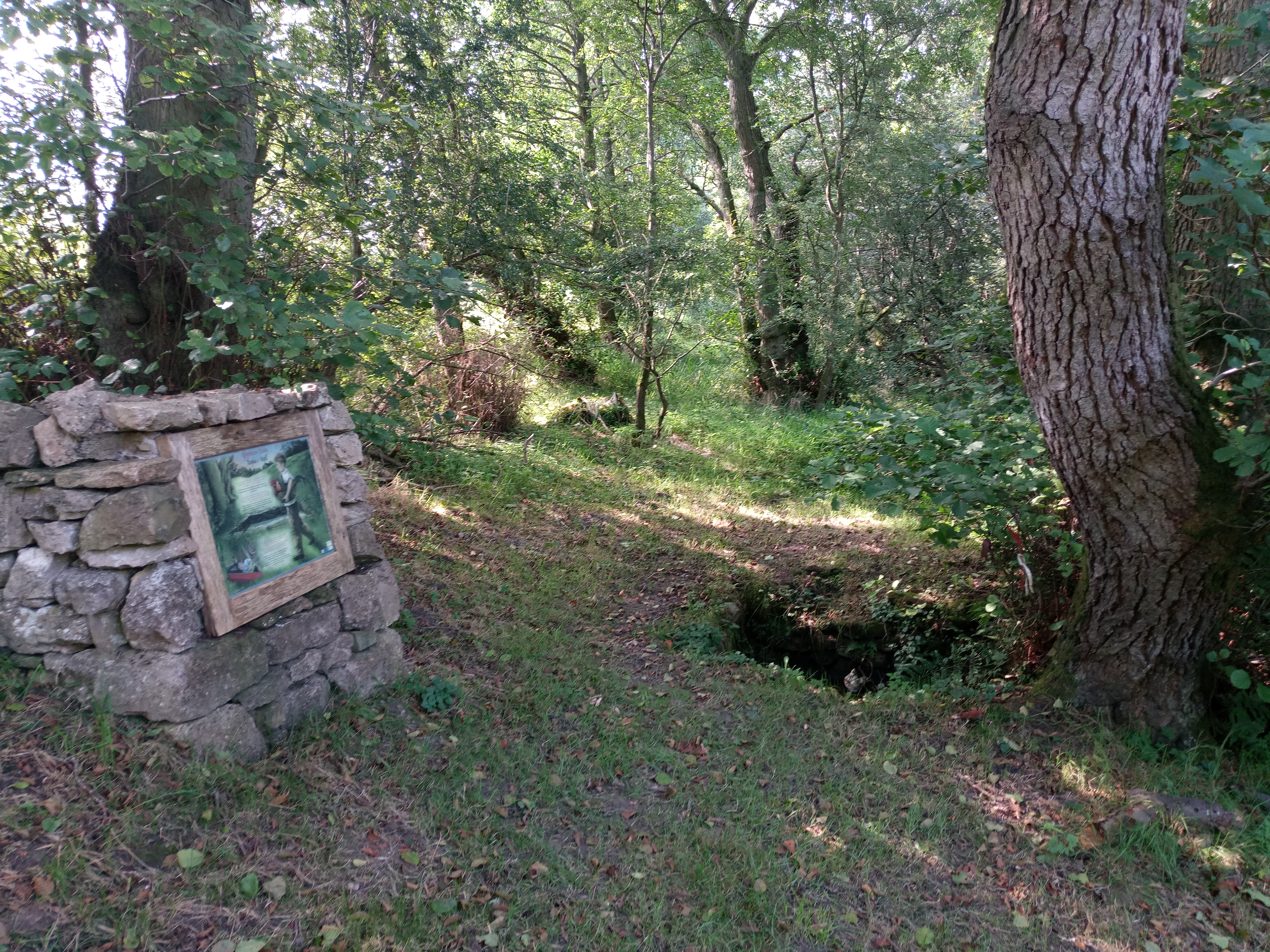
St Tecla's well with information board

Pennant recorded the Christian pilgrimage traditions, believed to date from the time of the Celtic Church, connected with St Tecla's Well, a holy well located in a field close to the church. Sufferers of what were known as Clwyf Tecla, "St Tecla's disease", washed themselves in the well after sunset and walked around it three times sunwise, leaving an offering of fourpence, afterwards spending the night inside the parish church.

The nineteenth-century folklorist Elias Owen recorded a tale about a "wicked Ghost" which haunted the rectory at Llandegla and was eventually exorcised by a man named Griffiths from Graianrhyd. The spirit was said to have been buried in a box under a large stone in the River Alyn close to Llandegla's bridge.

The village has an annual Summer Fate festival, which involves vegetable growing, and artwork competitions, as well sports races for the local children.

== Amenities ==
Natural features in the area include the Clwydian Range to the north-west of the village, Llandegla Forest to the south-east and the Horseshoe Pass to the south. The Offa's Dyke Path and Clwydian Way long-distance walking routes pass through the village. Llandegla also has a mountain bike centre located in the forest.

Notable people who have lived in the village include the author Edward Tegla Davies and the hymn-writer and poet Ehedydd Iâl (né William Jones).
