= Ruabon Moors =

Moorland in north Wales

Coordinates: 53.033°N 3.137°W

The Ruabon Moors are an area of upland moorland in Wales to the west of Ruabon and Wrexham. They lie partly within Wrexham County Borough and partly within Denbighshire.

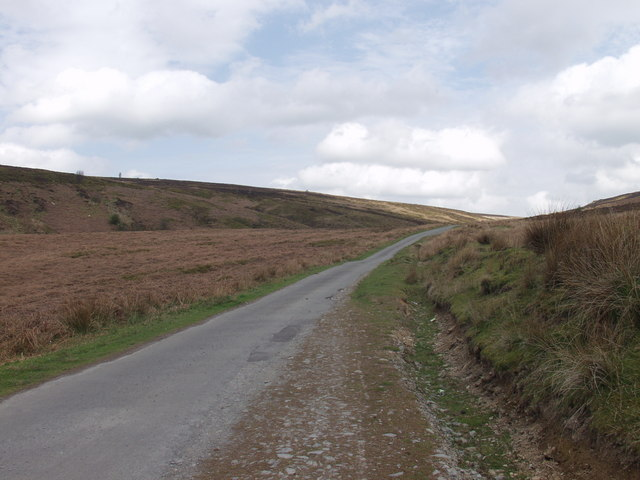
Road across Esclusham Mountain

In the northern part of the moors are the areas known as Minera Mountain and Esclusham Mountain. Further south are Ruabon Mountain and Eglwyseg Mountain. In the west the moors reach their greatest height at Cyrn-y-Brain, 565 metres (1,854 ft) above sea level.

To the north and north-east, the moors are bounded by Minera Limeworks and the Clywedog valley. In the east they slope down to the villages of Rhosllannerchrugog and Ruabon. There are several small reservoirs in this area. At the southern edge of the moors the cliffs of Eglwyseg Rocks overlook the River Dee and the Vale of Llangollen. On the western side there are more cliffs at World's End while the Horseshoe Pass separates the moors from Llantysilio Mountain. Llandegla Forest, a large conifer plantation, covers the north-western side.

Ruabon Moors are part of the Clwydian Range and Dee Valley Area of Outstanding Natural Beauty and a Site of Special Scientific Interest, hosting a wide variety of plant and animal life. Large parts of the moors are covered with heather. Where there are outcrops of limestone on the surface a number of scarce plants can be found such as prickly sedge, dark red helleborine and rigid buckler-fern.

The moors are managed for red grouse shooting. Huge numbers were shot in the past (an average of 4658 per year from 1900 to 1913) but numbers have now decreased dramatically. The area is also home to black grouse and a major conservation programme has caused their population to increase in recent years. Other birds which can be seen include peregrine falcon, merlin, hen harrier, short-eared owl and ring ouzel.

The area has been modified by human activity since prehistoric times when people built cairns and cleared the original forest. Mining has taken place in the area since Roman times and there are still many shafts of disused lead, zinc, silver and coal mines dotting the area. During the Second World War bombs were dropped on the moors by German planes heading to and from Liverpool and a number of bomb craters can still be seen today.

The area is popular with walkers and rock-climbers and the Offa's Dyke Path crosses the region.
