= Horseshoe Pass =

Mountain pass in Denbighshire, Wales

- Welsh: Bwlch yr Oernant
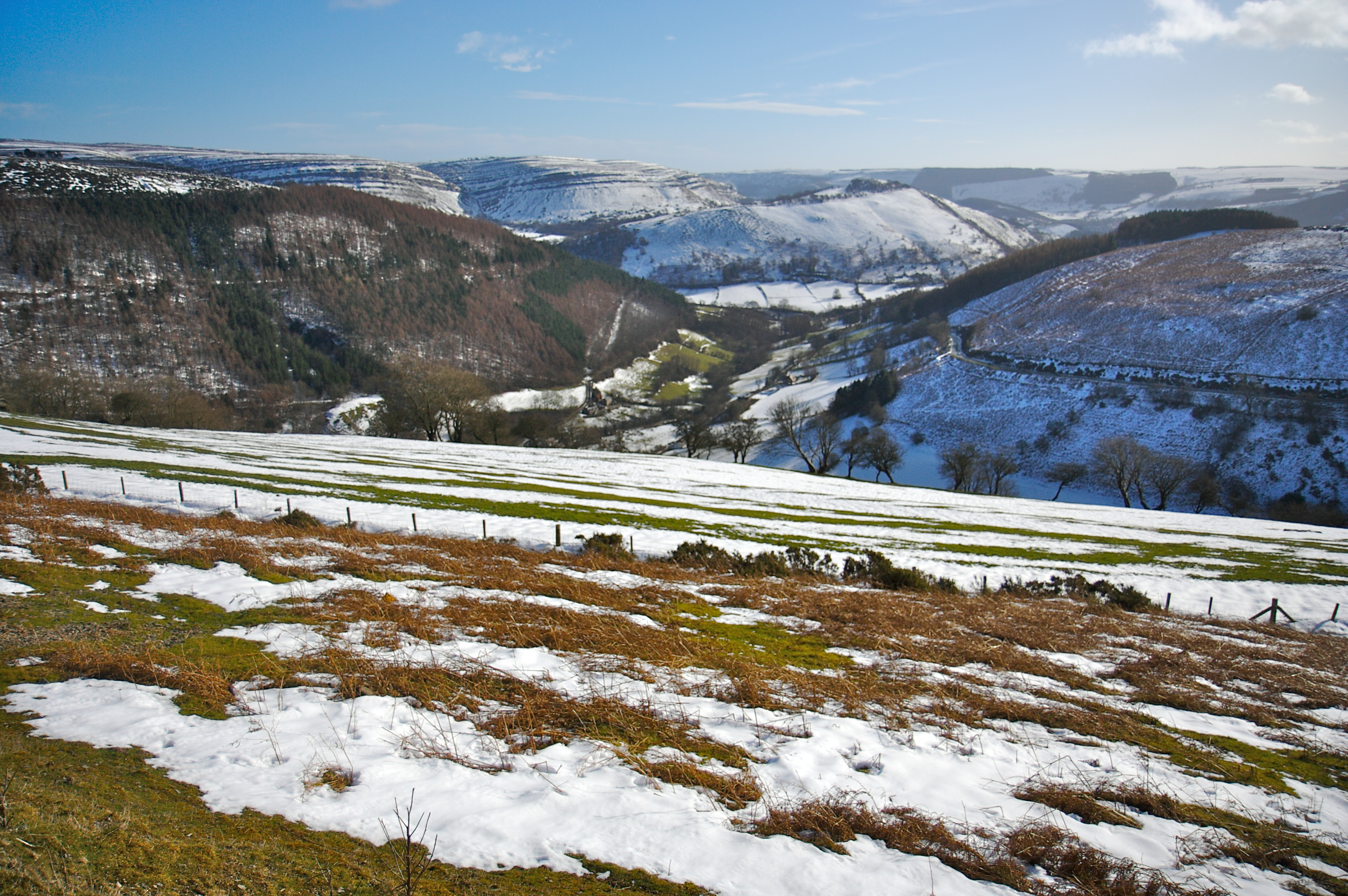
- Interactive map of Horseshoe Pass
- Elevation: 417 metres (1,368 ft)

Third Approach
- Location: Denbighshire, north-east Wales
- Coordinates: 53.0135°N 3.2162°W

The Horseshoe Pass (Welsh: Bwlch yr Oernant, "Pass of the Cold Stream") is a mountain pass in Denbighshire, north-east Wales. It separates Llantysilio Mountain to the west from the 565 metre (1,854 feet) mountain and Marilyn Cyrn-y-Brain to the east. The A542 road from Llandegla to Llangollen runs through the pass, reaching a maximum height of 417 metres (1,368 ft). The road travels in a horseshoe shape around the sides of a valley, giving the pass its English name. In 2022, a proposal for a 40 mph speed limit on the Horseshoe Pass was approved after a lengthy campaign by Llangollen's county councillors.

This route dates from 1811, when a turnpike road was constructed across the area. As with the rest of the roads in the Clwydian Range, it is not uncommon for sheep to gather in the road, sometimes causing problems for drivers. The road is also frequently closed in winter due to snowfall or landslides.

The Pass is well known for the Ponderosa cafe at its highest point and the scenic views along the road. Both the cafe and the pass itself are extremely popular with cyclists and motorcyclists. There are many walks and routes in the immediate area that are popular with hikers, and there are a number of campsites nearby. The Ponderosa café closed in 2025.

The area was devastated by wildfires in 2018 which broke out 19 July, and continued until 25 September, damaging 715 acres of land.

== Gallery ==
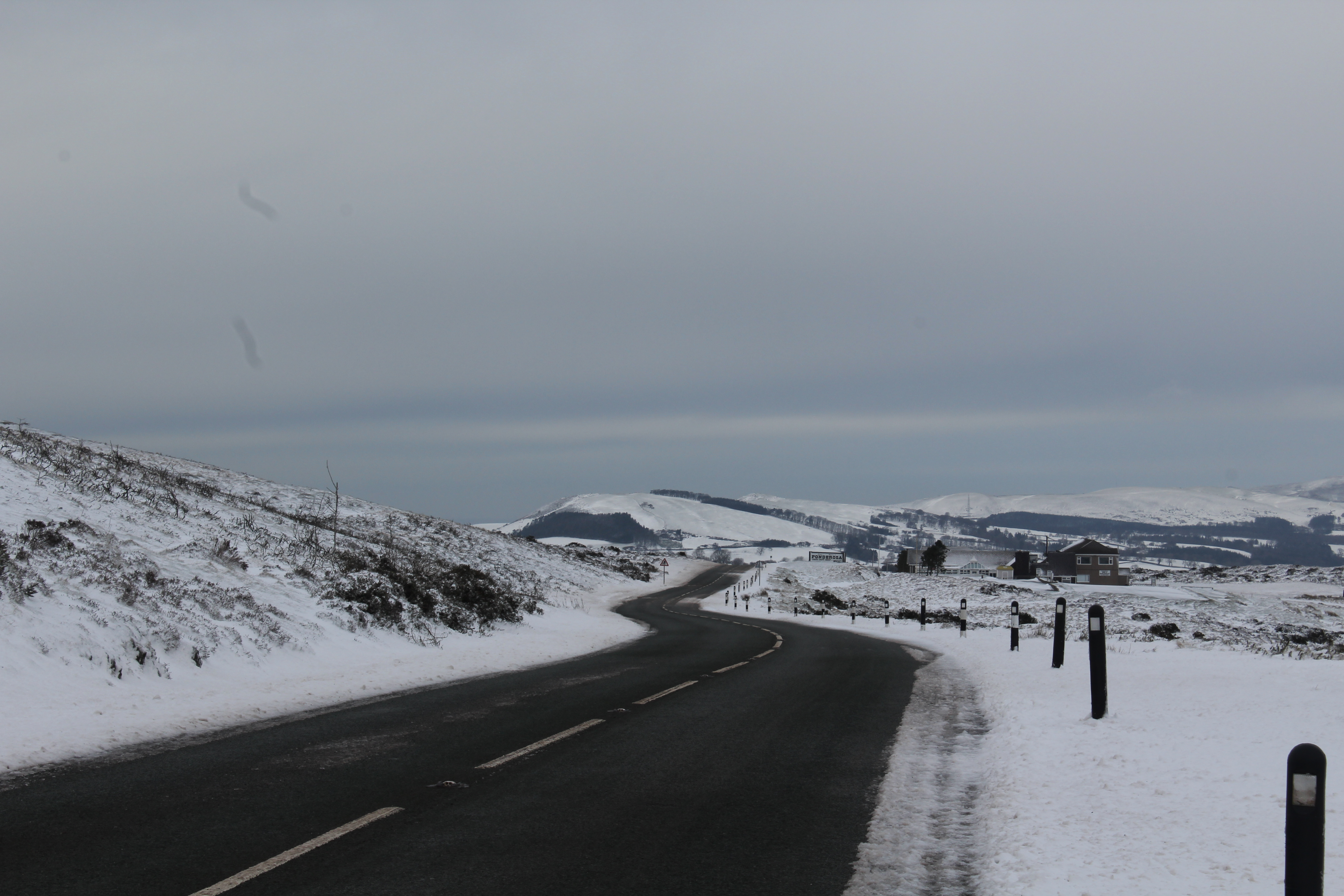
View of pass and the Ponderosa Cafe

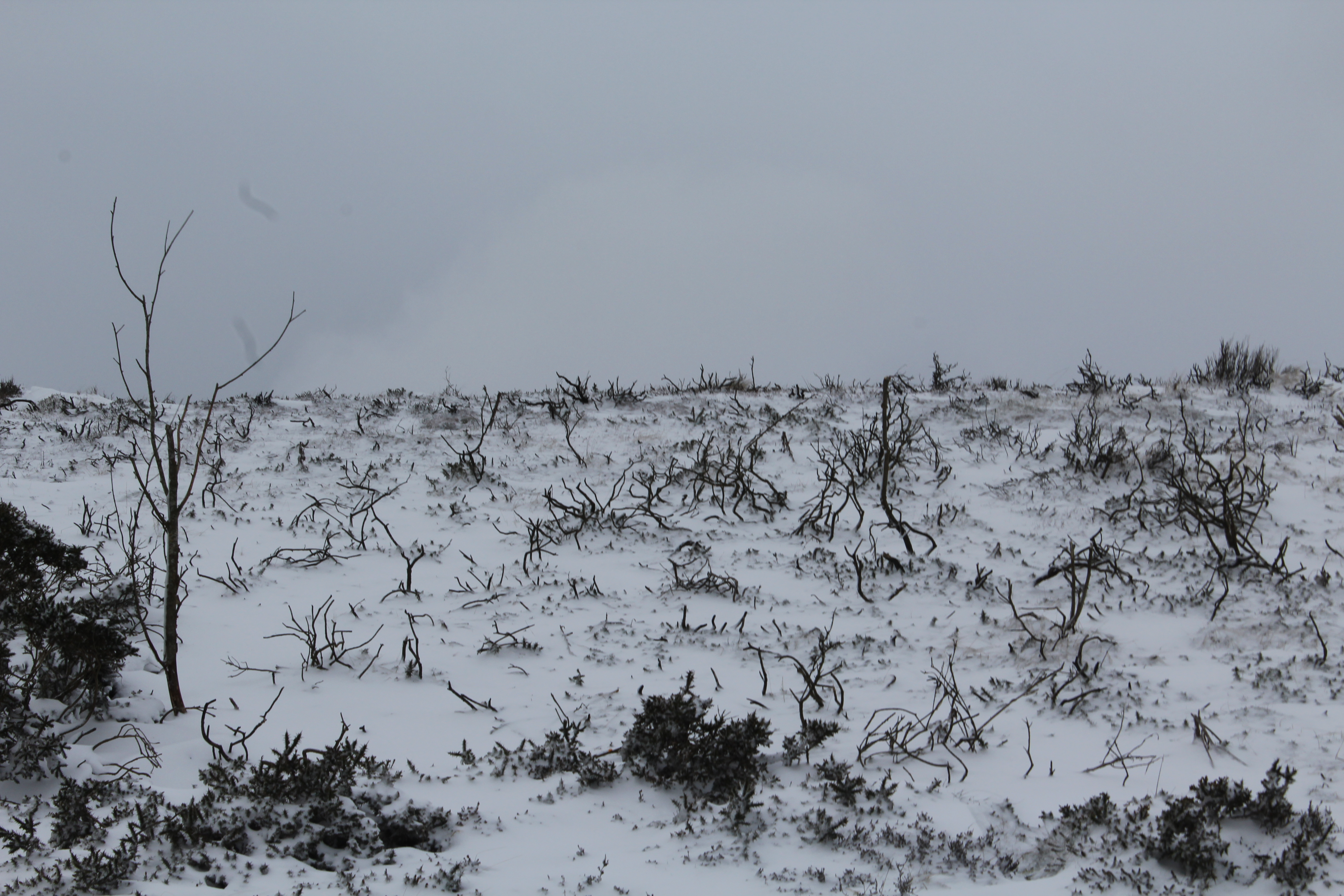
Scrubland under snow

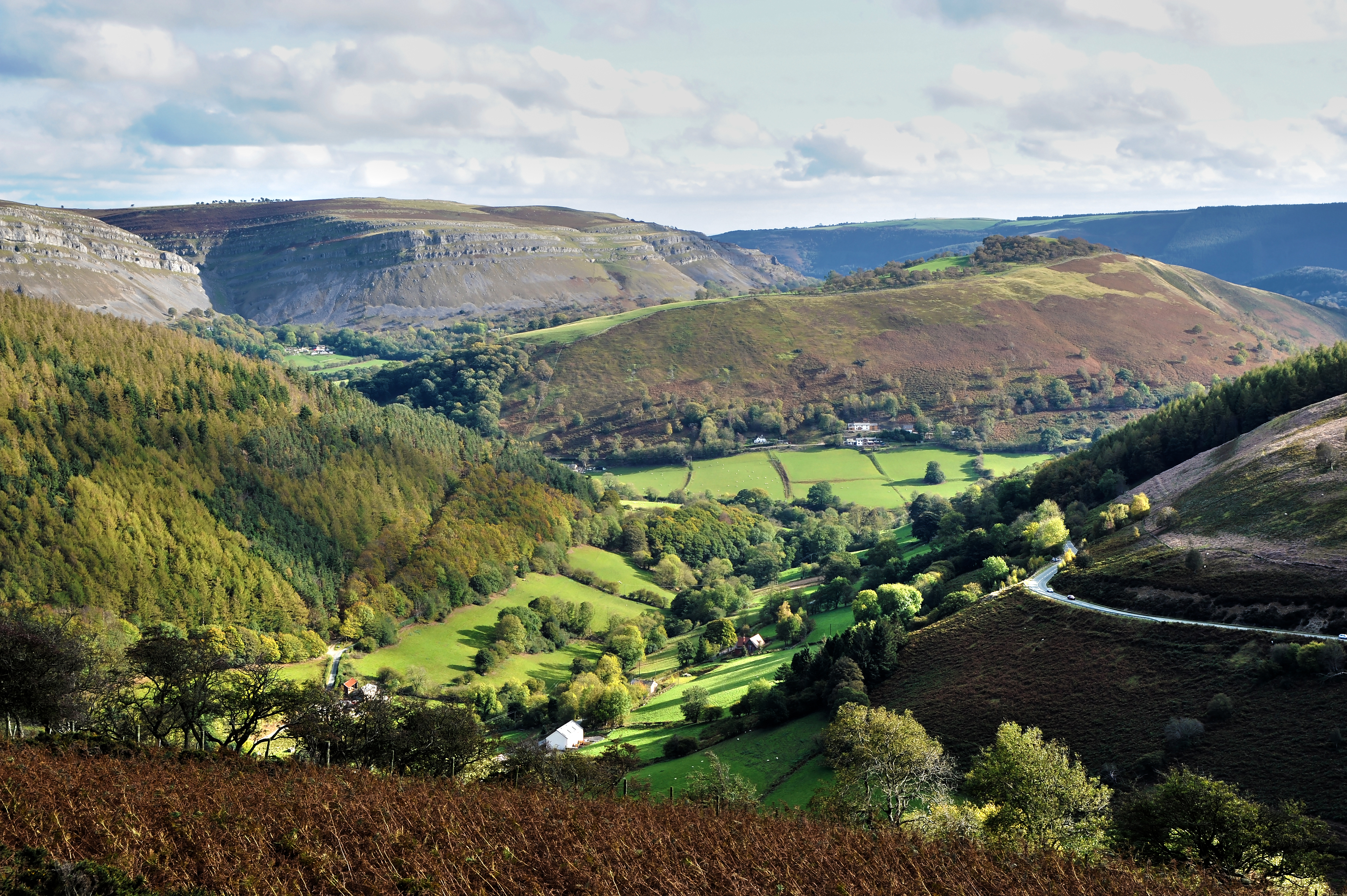
Eglwyseg valley from Horseshoe Pass

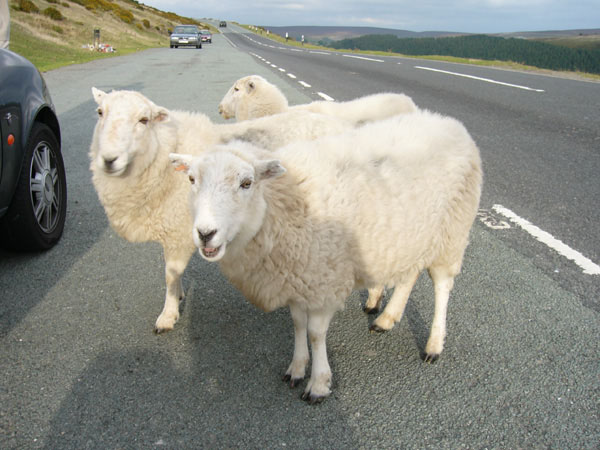
Sheep in a lay-by

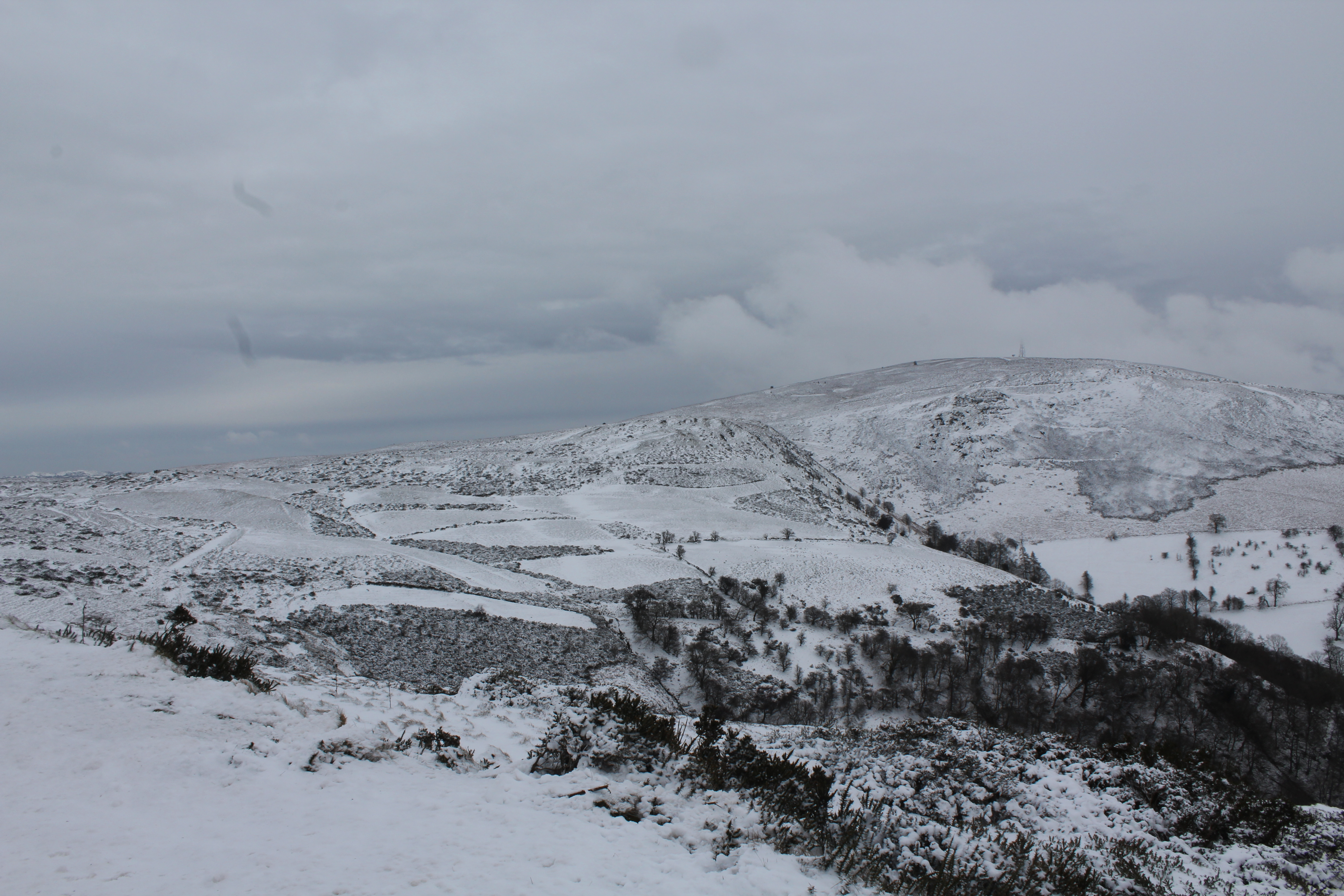
View north-east from pass

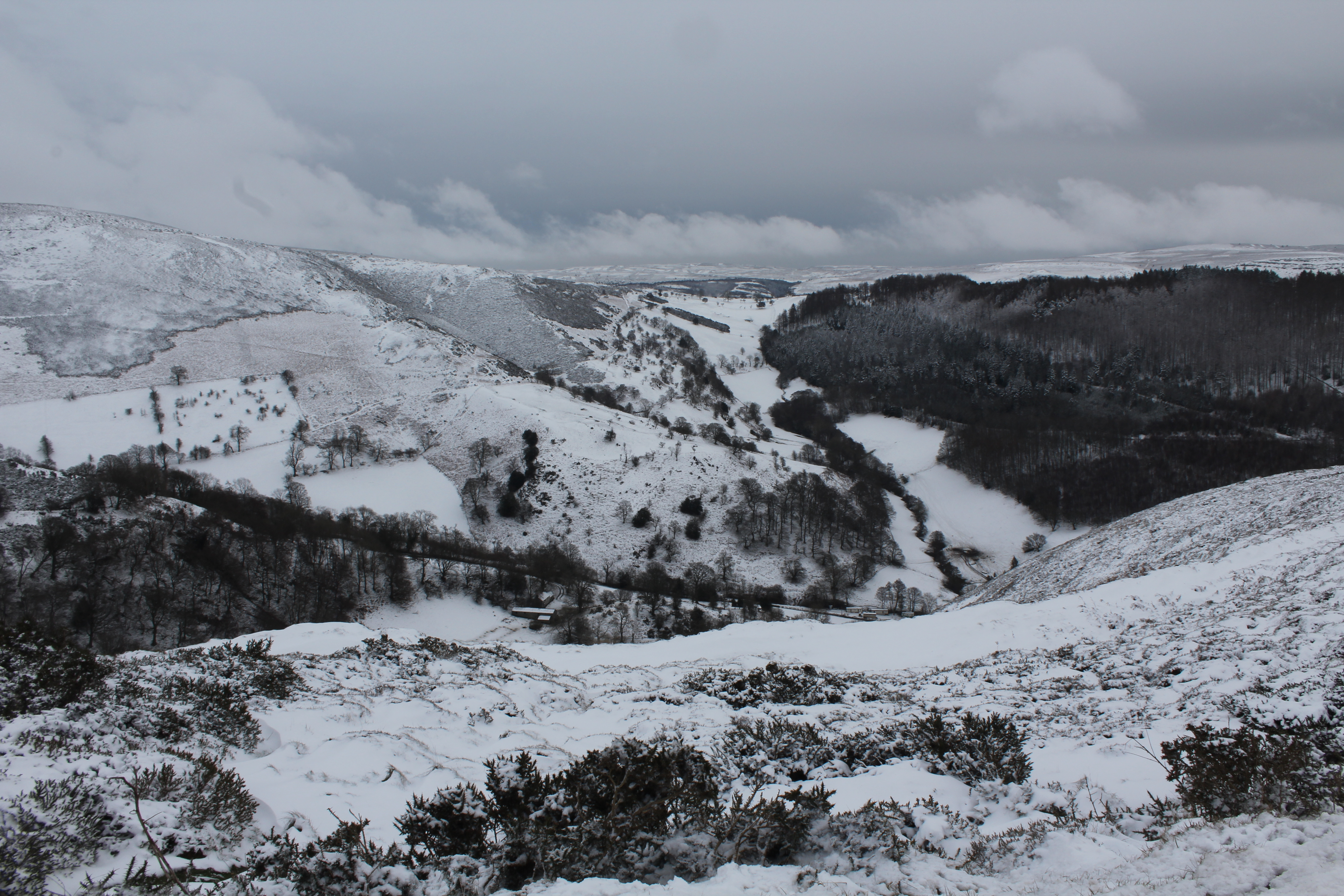
View south-east from pass
