= Eglwyseg =

Valley in Denbighshire, Wales

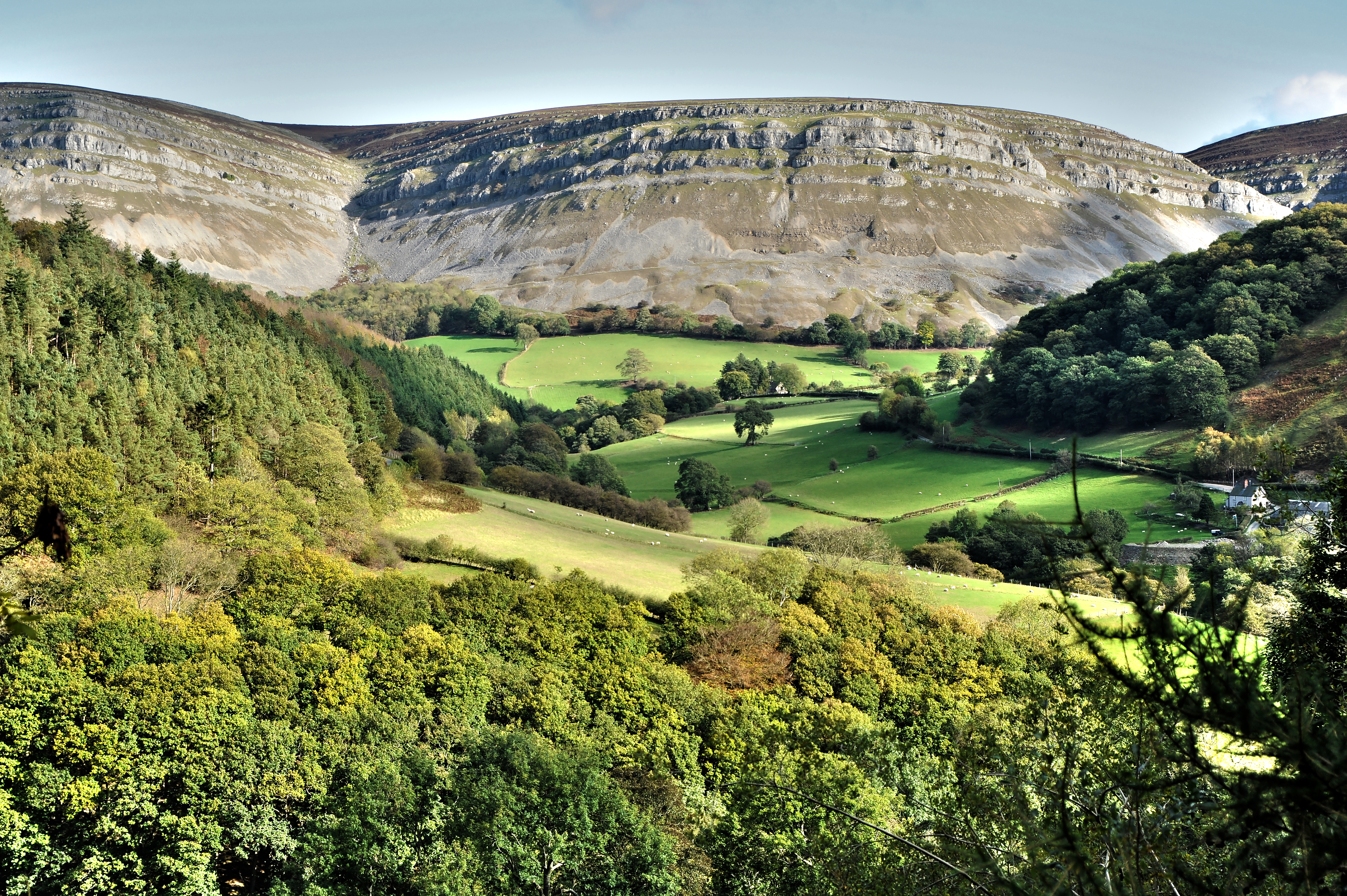
Eglwyseg valley

The Eglwyseg valley is an area to the north east of Llangollen in Denbighshire, Wales; it is within the boundaries of Llantysilio Community. The name also refers to a widely scattered hamlet in the valley.

Formerly the old township of Eglwysegl or Eglwysegle, the area is now best known for its dramatic rock formations and unspoiled historic landscape.

== Topography ==
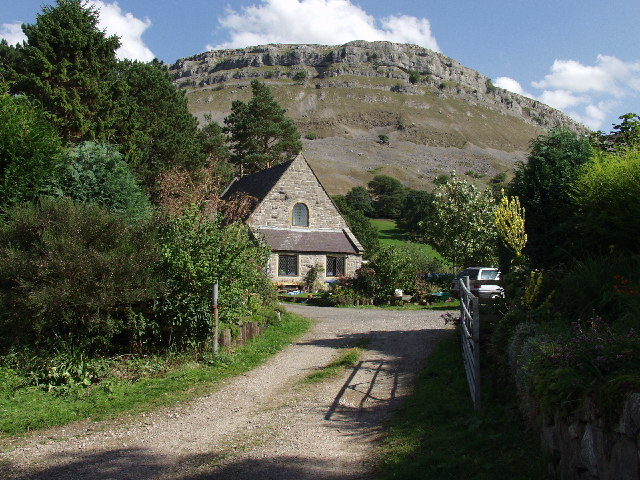
The former St Mary's church, beneath the tiered limestone crags of the Eglwyseg Rocks.

The area is best known for the prominent Lower Carboniferous Limestone escarpment, the Eglwyseg Rocks, (Welsh: Creigiau Eglwyseg, 52.998°N 3.164°W), which runs north–south for around 4.5 miles (7.2 km). The high point of the area is at 513 metres (1,683 ft) on Mynydd Eglwyseg (Eglwyseg Mountain, 53.0089°N 3.1471°W). Various parts of the escarpment have specific names; these include Craig y Forwyn (maiden's rock), Craig Arthur (Arthur's rock), Tair Naid y Gath (the three leaps of the cat) and Craig y Cythraul (Devil's rock). The Afon Eglwyseg (Eglwyseg River) flows through the valley, joined by a number of tributary streams such as the Nant Elli and Nant Craig y Moch.

The head of the valley is known as World's End, and is a popular spot with walkers, cyclists and tourists. The lower end of the valley joins the Vale of Llangollen, the Eglwyseg River flowing into the River Dee near Pentrefelin.

== History ==
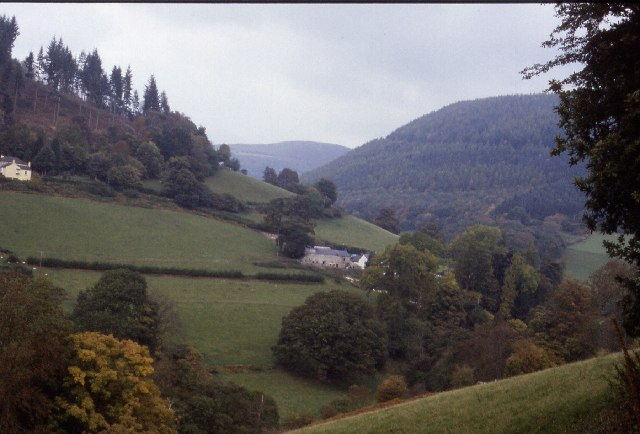
The lower part of the Eglwyseg valley, near Hendre, showing its characteristic landscape of woods and steeply sloping pastures.

The entire valley has been designated a Site of Special Scientific Interest and Landscape of Special Historic Interest. The upland moors have several Bronze Age burial mounds, and there is evidence of agricultural use of the area from the Bronze Age onwards, with the higher pastures being used for summer grazing and the valleys for winter grazing and as arable land, the latter indicated by remaining lynchets. Historically, the crags have been quarried for limestone, and there are also several disused lead mines; the land use is currently a mixture of heather moorland managed for black grouse, improved sheep pasture and oak woodland, with conifer plantations dating from the second half of the twentieth century. In 2000 an insect infestation meant that the entire moorland was sprayed to kill off the insects. This was successful and soon after sheep were allowed to graze in the moorland.

The ancient township of Eglwysegl (also spelt "Eglwysegle" or "Egloysegle", and the root of the modern name Eglwyseg) occupied part of the area. Some antiquaries, such as Edward Lhuyd and Thomas Pennant, speculated that it may have taken its name from Eliseg (Elisedd ap Gwylog), a historical king of Powys. It is, however, more likely that the name Eglwysegl was in fact derived from the Latin ecclesicula, a diminutive of ecclesia - a "churchlet or chapel".

The relatively remote area continued to be farmed under freehold tenure; Pennant alluded to this when, writing around 1778, he described the valley:

Long and narrow, bounded on the right by astonishing precipices, divided into numberless parallel strata of white limestone, often giving birth to vast yew-trees [...] this valley is chiefly inhabited (happily) by an independent race of warm and wealthy yeomanry, undevoured as yet by the great men of the country.

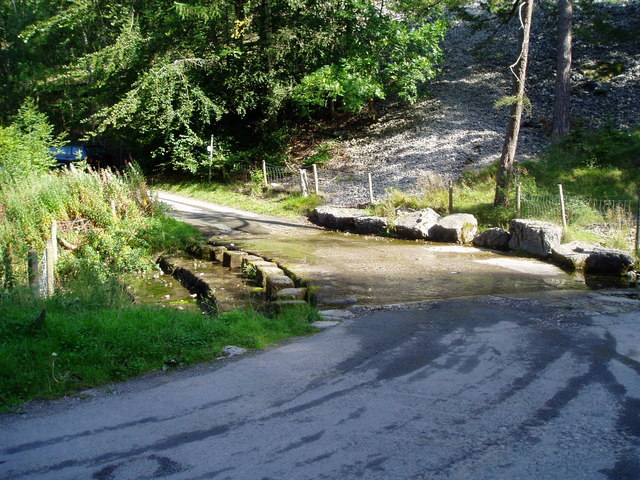
Ford across the river at World's End, beneath Craig y Forwyn

A medieval church, perhaps the chapel referred to in the name Eglwysegl, was marked on Speed and Saxton's 17th-century maps of the valley, but it had disappeared by 1808. The school church of St Mary's, built on land donated by Sir Watkin Williams-Wynn, was opened in 1871; it held its last service in 1985 and has now been converted to residential use. The valley also contained a nonconformist (Calvinistic Methodist) chapel, built in 1856, closed in 1930, and now ruinous. Until the early 20th century, when they were culverted, there were many fords across Eglwyseg's numerous streams (the road from Esclusham Mountain still fords the river at World's End), and there are also a number of 18th-century stone bridges.

The limestone cliffs were quarried in the past for building stone, and lime kilns were used to convert limestone to lime. This had uses as lime mortar as well as to improve soil. At the top of the valley, at Craig y Forwyn (near World's End) there was a lead and silver mine which operated in the mid 19th century. Also near the head of the valley, but on the Western side, was the Pant Glas slate quarry. After several years prospecting in the valley by John Jones and George Evans a body of slate was discovered there in 1883. With the backing of a Mr George Roper of London the Pant Glas Slate and Slab Company was formed in 1883. An incline was built that year, and there were plans to build a tramway to carry the slate to Llangollen (much like the nearby Oernant Tramway), but this was never built. There was a tragedy in 1886 when three men were killed in the quarry by the sudden collapse of 1000 tons of overhanging rock. The Pant Glas slate company was put into voluntary liquidation in 1892, the same year that the Llangollen Slab and Slate Company was wound up with closure of its quarries and the Pentrefelin slate and slab mill.

== Folklore ==
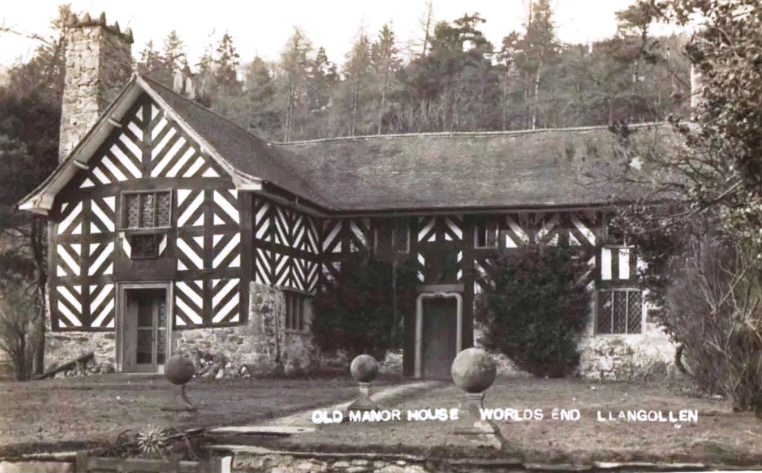
Plas Uchaf (Plas Ucha) manor house, World's End.

Eglwyseg was the setting for a popular legend of St. Collen, who was supposed to have killed a giantess called Cares y Bwlch, despite her call for aid from Arthur, another giant who had made his home in the Eglwyseg Rocks. The legend, related by Sabine Baring-Gould, was recorded at Corwen, amongst other localities.

The manor house of Plas Uchaf yn Eglwyseg [Grid reference SJ 22828 47942] was said to stand on the site of a hunting lodge belonging to Owain ap Cadwgan, a prince of Powys: a story related that it was the place to which Owain took Nest ferch Rhys, when he abducted her and her children from Gerald de Windsor, her husband, in 1109. There was also a local tradition that a Prince Llewelyn had once hidden in a cave in the rocks near Plas Uchaf (there were several Welsh princes of this name). Plas Uchaf was later the home of John Jones Maesygarnedd, a prominent Republican in the Wars of the Three Kingdoms, and one of the regicides of Charles I.

== Today ==
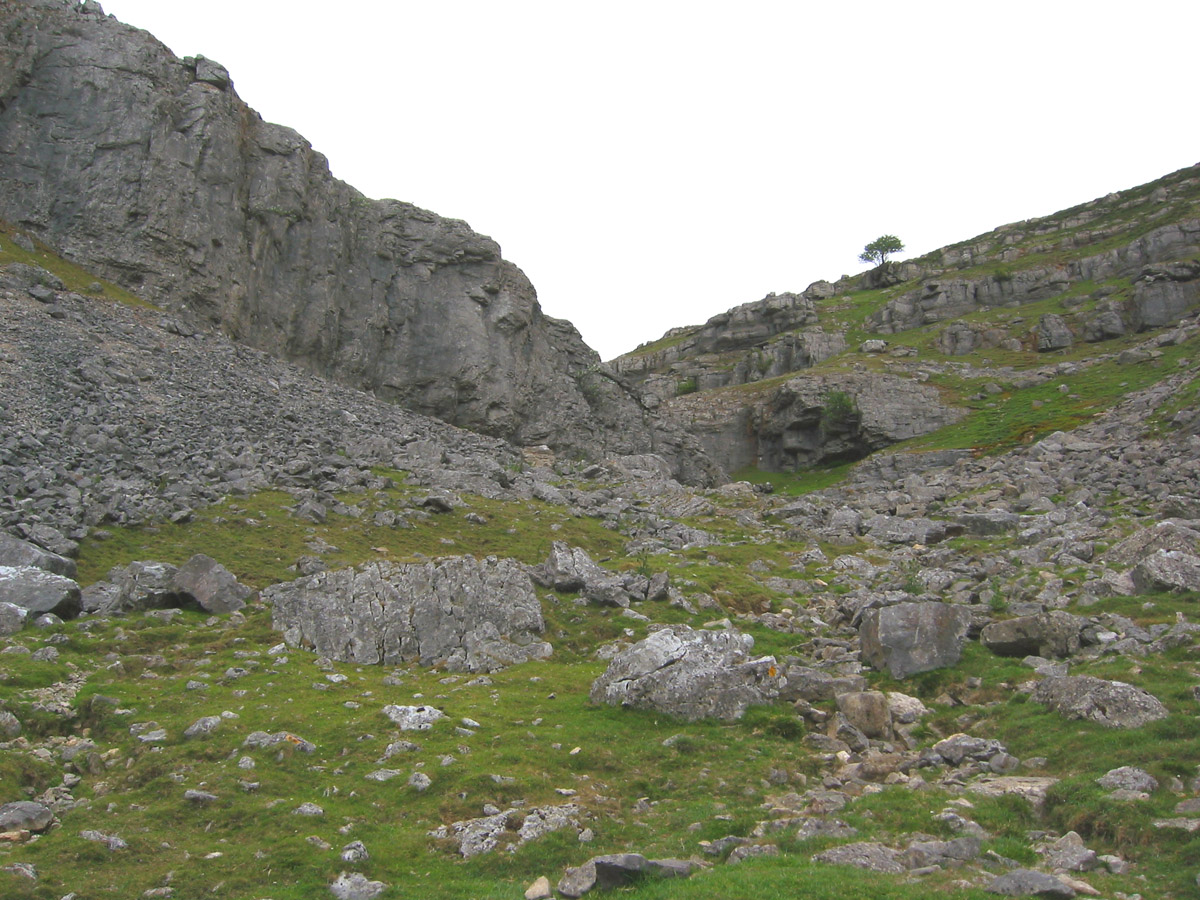
Creigiau Eglwyseg, where several nationally rare plants can be found.

Offa's Dyke Path passes through the area, and Eglwyseg is also popular with rock climbers, with around 800 routes, both sport and traditional.

The 'Panorama Walk' starts at the westernmost junction of Blackwood Road (Garth Mountain) [Grid reference SJ 2481 4310], accessed from the A539 Ruabon-Llangollen main road either via Tower Hill in Acrefair or Garth Road, Trevor. From Blackwood Road the Walk (or drive) proceeds SSE to the sharp right turn to head westwards along the Vale of Llangollen. Approximately 100m beyond the cattle grid is a small parking area from which a pathway leads to the stone memorial [Grid reference SJ 24589 42874] erected for local Welsh poet, I. D. Hooson. At the next clear bend [Grid reference SJ 2409 4295] the 'Walk' joins the Offa's Dyke Path and affords magnificent views of the Dee Valley, Castell Dinas Brân and the mountains beyond, and Trevor Rocks (with quarry) which marks the easternmost outcrop of the main Eglwyseg Escarpment. The junction with Dinbren Road [Grid reference SJ 2170 4463], which leads to Llangollen town centre, is where the Panorama walk officially ends; the Offa's Dyke Path continues onwards to World's End and beyond.

Eglwyseg is one of the few sites where the Whitebeam Sorbus anglica is known to grow, and one of only three sites where the Welsh Hawkweed (Heiracium cambricum) has been recorded. The rare Limestone Oak Fern Gymnocarpium robertianum and Rigid Buckler-Fern Dryopteris submontana have also been recorded here.
