= List of places in Denbighshire =

Map of places in Denbighshire compiled from this list
See the list of places in Wales for places in other principal areas.

This is a list of towns and villages in the principal area of Denbighshire, Wales.

== A ==
- Aberwheeler

== B ==
- Berwyn, Denbighshire
- Betws Gwerfil Goch
- Bodelwyddan
- Bodfari
- Bontuchel
- Bryneglwys
- Bylchau

== C ==
- Carrog
- Castell, Denbighshire
- Cefnmeriadog
- Cerrigydrudion
- Chirk
- Clocaenog
- Corwen
- Crogen
- Cwm, Denbighshire
- Cyffylliog
- Cynwyd

== D ==
- Denbigh
- Derwen
- Druid, Denbighshire
- Dyserth

== E ==
- Efenechtyd

== G ==
- Garth, Denbighshire
- Gellifor
- Gellioedd
- Glasfryn
- Glyndyfrdwy
- Gronant
- Gwaenysgor
- Gwyddelwern

== H ==
- Henllan
- Hirwaen

== L ==
- Llanarmon-yn-Iâl
- Llanbedr-Dyffryn-Clwyd
- Llandegla
- Llandrillo
- Llandyrnog
- Llannefydd
- Llanelidan
- Llanferres
- Llanfwrog
- Llangollen
- Llangwyfan
- Llangyhafal
- Llanrhaeadr-yng-Nghinmeirch
- Llanychan
- Llanynys
- Llwynmawr

== M ==
- Maerdy, Denbighshire
- Maeshafn
- Meliden

== N ==
- Nantglyn

== P ==
- Prestatyn
- Prion
- Pentrecelyn

Peniel

== R ==
- Rhewl (on the River Clywedog)
- Rhewl (on the River Dee)
- Rhewl (near the Nant Mawr)
- Rhuallt
- Rhuddlan
- Rhyl
- Ruthin

== S ==
- Saron
- St. Asaph

== T ==
- Tafarn Y Gelyn
- Trefnant
- Trelawnyd
- Tremeirchion

== See also ==
- List of places in Denbighshire (categorised)
- List of places in Wales
