= 2012 Denbighshire County Council election =

Welsh local election

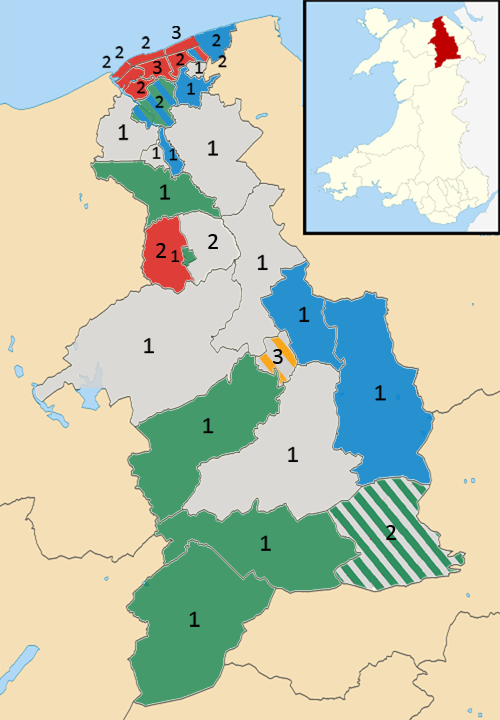
2012 election results map, showing numbers of councillors per ward and their party affiliations

The 2012 Denbighshire County Council election took place in Denbighshire, Wales, on 3 May 2012 to elect members of Denbighshire Council. This was the same day as other 2012 United Kingdom local elections. The previous elections took place in 2008 and the next all-council elections took place in 2017.

== Background ==
Labour Party and Independent candidates were hoping to take seats from the governing Conservatives. Topical issues included the county's Local Development Plan and redevelopment of Rhyl's seafront, as well as the usual funding pressures and unemployment. Four of the 30 electoral wards were uncontested, while in the Ruthin ward there were 12 candidates competing for the 3 seats.

== Results ==
=== Overview ===
The 39.1% turnout was even lower than the turnout in 2008 (42%), despite the weather being sunny. It was particularly low in areas of social deprivation, such as Rhyl West.

Denbighshire County Council election 2012
Party	Seats	Gains	Losses	Net gain/loss	Seats %	Votes %	Votes	+/−
Labour	19			+12	40.4	29.2	8,293	+13.2
Conservative	8			-10	17.0	27.2	7,745	-1.8
Independent	12			-1	25.5	25.4	7,217	-6.4
Plaid Cymru	7			-1	14.9	11.5	3,270	-3.6
Liberal Democrats	1			0	2.1	5.0	1,418	-2.2
Green	0			0	0.0	1.0	274	New
Socialist Labour	0			0	0.0	0.4	122	New
UKIP	0			0	0.0	0.3	85	-0.2
BNP	-	-	-	-	-	-	-	-0.4

=== Election error ===
In the Prestatyn North ward, the incorrect councillor was declared the winner, due to his similar surname. Conservative councillor Allan Pennington became councillor for the ward, after 265 votes for the Labour candidate, Paul Penlington, were allocated to him. Penlington was not able to take his rightful seat until 14 February 2013, after a court case involving three High Court judges.

== Ward results ==
=== Bodelwyddan (one seat) ===
Bodelwyddan 2012 ^{(a)}
Party	Candidate	Votes	%	±%
Independent	Elizabeth Jones *	294	48.9	
Labour	Stephen Ellison	223	37.1	
Conservative	Nan Jones	84	14.0	
Majority		71		
Turnout			37.4	
Registered electors		1,616		
Independent hold		Swing		

=== Corwen (one seat) ===
Corwen 2012
Party	Candidate	Votes	%	±%
Plaid Cymru	Huw Jones *	unopposed		
Registered electors		1,862		
Plaid Cymru hold		Swing		

=== Denbigh Central (one seat) ===
Denbigh Central 2012
Party	Candidate	Votes	%	±%
Plaid Cymru	Gwyneth Kensler *	288	48.7	
Independent	Peter Jones	191	32.3	
Independent	Robert Parkes	87	14.7	
Conservative	Anton Sampson	25	4.2	
Majority		97		
Turnout			37.7	
Registered electors		1,584		
Plaid Cymru hold		Swing		

=== Denbigh Lower (two seats) ===
Denbigh Lower 2012
Party	Candidate	Votes	%	±%
Independent	John Bartley *	977	60.7	
Independent	Richard Davies	579		
Independent	Mark Young	504		
Plaid Cymru	Jean Gwynn	386	23.8	
Independent	Keith Stevens	204		
Liberal Democrats	William Williams	138	8.5	
Conservative	Diane Highton	118	7.3	
Majority		398		
Turnout			45.5	
Registered electors		3,583		
Independent hold		Swing		
Independent gain from Plaid Cymru		Swing		

=== Denbigh Upper/Henllan (two seats) ===
Denbigh Upper/Henllan 2012
Party	Candidate	Votes	%	±%
Labour	Colin Hughes *	504	55.8	
Labour	Geraint Lloyd-Williams	392		
Conservative	Diane Highton *	246	27.2	
UKIP	Jean Gwynn	85	9.4	
Liberal Democrats	William Williams	69	7.6	
Majority		146		
Turnout			34.4	
Registered electors		2,336		
Labour hold		Swing		
Labour gain from Conservative		Swing		

=== Dyserth (one seat) ===
Dyserth 2012
Party	Candidate	Votes	%	±%
Conservative	Peter Owen *	369	50.7	
Labour	Peter Newell	275	37.8	
Liberal Democrats	Heather Prydderch	84	11.5	
Majority		94		
Turnout			39.2	
Registered electors		1,890		
Conservative hold		Swing		

=== Efenechtyd (one seat) ===
Efenechtyd 2012
Party	Candidate	Votes	%	±%
Plaid Cymru	Eryl Williams *	unopposed		
Registered electors		1,306		
Plaid Cymru hold		Swing		

=== Llanarmon-Yn-Lal/Llandelga (one seat) ===
Llanarmon-Yn-Lal/Llandelga 2012
Party	Candidate	Votes	%	±%
Conservative	Martyn Holland	523	50.2	
Independent	Peter Rees	281	27.0	
Socialist Labour	Robert English	122	11.7	
Independent	Robert Barton	115	11.0	
Majority		242		
Turnout			53.6	
Registered electors		1,968		
Conservative gain from Independent		Swing		

=== Llanbedr Dyffryn Clwyd (one seat) ===
Llanbedr Dyffryn Clwyd 2012
Party	Candidate	Votes	%	±%
Conservative	Huw Williams	348	60.3	
Independent	Julie Masters	129	22.4	
Labour	Mary Chaffé	100	17.3	
Majority		219		
Turnout			47.2	
Registered electors		1,226		
Conservative hold		Swing		

=== Llandrillo (one seat) ===
Llandrillo 2012
Party	Candidate	Votes	%	±%
Plaid Cymru	Cefyn Williams *	unopposed		
Registered electors		941		
Plaid Cymru hold		Swing		

=== Llandyrnog (one seat) ===
Llandyrnog 2012
Party	Candidate	Votes	%	±%
Independent	Thomas Parry	377	50.1	
Independent	Christopher Denman	192	25.5	
Labour	John McGuire	85	11.3	
Plaid Cymru	John McCabe	73	9.7	
Liberal Democrats	Robin Hill	25	3.3	
Majority		185		
Turnout			44.6	
Registered electors		1,694		
Independent hold		Swing		

=== Llanfair Dyffryn Clwyd Gwyddelwern (one seat) ===
Llanfair Dyffryn Clwyd Gwyddelwern 2012
Party	Candidate	Votes	%	±%
Independent	Hugh Evans *	unopposed		
Registered electors		1,816		
Independent hold		Swing		

=== Llangollen (two seats) ===
Llangollen 2012
Party	Candidate	Votes	%	±%
Plaid Cymru	Trefor Hughes *	678	36.4	
Independent	Stuart Davies	459	24.7	
Labour	John Palmer	427	22.9	
Plaid Cymru	Jonathan Haddy	217		
Independent	Michael Edwards	212		
Conservative	Paul Firth	206	11.1	
Green	Robert Spalding	91	4.9	
Majority		32		
Turnout			39.2	
Registered electors		3,362		
Plaid Cymru hold		Swing		
Independent hold		Swing		

=== Llanrhaeadr-yng-Nghinmeirch (one seat) ===
Llanrhaeadr-yng-Nghinmeirch 2012
Party	Candidate	Votes	%	±%
Independent	Joseph Welch	254	38.2	
Plaid Cymru	Hefin Edwards	219	32.9	
Conservative	Gregory Wynne	146	22.0	
Green	Dominic Oakes	46	6.9	
Majority		35		
Turnout			44.0	
Registered electors		1,524		
Independent hold		Swing		

=== Prestatyn Central (two seats) ===
Prestatyn Central 2012
Party	Candidate	Votes	%	±%
Labour	Peter Duffy *	611	47.9	
Conservative	Hugh Irvine	578	45.3	
Labour	Sherayne Edwards	551		
Conservative	June Cahill *	487		
Green	Kay Roney	87	6.8	
Majority		27		
Turnout			44.5	
Registered electors		2,822		
Labour gain from Independent		Swing		
Conservative hold		Swing		

=== Prestatyn East (two seats) ===
Prestatyn East 2012
Party	Candidate	Votes	%	±%
Conservative	James Davies *	524	41.6	
Conservative	Julian Thompson-Hill *	463		
Labour	Caroline Holliday	364	28.9	
Labour	Kenneth Wells	341		
Independent	Julie Peters	322	25.6	
Independent	Leanne Knapp	300		
Green	John Roney	50	4.0	
Majority		99		
Turnout			39.2	
Registered electors		3,220		
Conservative hold		Swing		
Conservative hold		Swing		

=== Prestatyn Meliden (one seat) ===
Prestatyn Meliden 2012
Party	Candidate	Votes	%	±%
Independent	Peter Evans	264	44.2	
Conservative	Gerald Frobisher	174	29.1	
Labour	Robert Paterson	159	26.6	
Majority		90		
Turnout			39.1	
Registered electors		1,549		
Independent hold		Swing		

=== Prestatyn North (three seats) ===
Prestatyn North 2012
Party	Candidate	Votes	%	±%
Labour	Carys Guy-Davies	633	41.3	
Labour	Paul Penlington ^{b}	606		
Labour	Jason McLellan	598		
Independent	Michael German	557	36.4	
Independent	Isobel German	538		
Independent	George Flynn	472		
Independent	Gwynn Clague	438		
Conservative	Allan Pennington ^{b} *	341	22.3	
Conservative	Michael Eckersley *	325		
Conservative	Michelle Pope	314		
Majority		41		
Turnout			39.9	
Registered electors		4,717		
Labour gain from Conservative		Swing		
Labour gain from Conservative		Swing		
Labour gain from Conservative		Swing		

=== Prestatyn South West (two seats) ===
Prestatyn South West 2012
Party	Candidate	Votes	%	±%
Labour	Robert Murray	586	57.0	
Labour	Gareth Sandilands	562		
Conservative	Glyn Jones *	442	43.0	
Conservative	Sharon Frobisher *	424		
Majority		120		
Turnout			37.9	
Registered electors		2,856		
Labour gain from Conservative		Swing		
Labour gain from Conservative		Swing		

=== Rhuddlan (two seats) ===
Rhuddlan 2012
Party	Candidate	Votes	%	±%
Conservative	Janet Davies *	665	43.3	
Plaid Cymru	Arwel Roberts	419	27.3	
Independent	John Jones	382	24.9	
Conservative	Nathan Lamb	222		
Independent	William Jones	221		
Liberal Democrats	Kenneth Prydderch	71	4.6	
Majority		37		
Turnout			41.9	
Registered electors		2,936		
Conservative hold		Swing		
Plaid Cymru gain from Independent		Swing		

=== Rhyl East (two seats) ===
Rhyl East 2012
Party	Candidate	Votes	%	±%
Labour	Barry Mellor	667	47.7	
Labour	David Simmons	562		
Conservative	John Bellis *	464	33.2	
Conservative	Diana Hannam *	362		
Independent	Hugh Jones	267	19.1	
Majority		98		
Turnout			35.0	
Registered electors		3,796		
Labour gain from Conservative		Swing		
Labour gain from Conservative		Swing		

=== Rhyl South (two seats) ===
Rhyl South 2012
Party	Candidate	Votes	%	±%
Labour	Jeanette Chamberlain-Jones *	733	56.3	
Labour	Cheryl Williams	508		
Conservative	David Lee *	361	27.7	
Conservative	Melanie Jones	337		
Plaid Cymru	Alun Edwards	208	16.0	
Majority		98		
Turnout			39.5	
Registered electors		3,022		
Labour hold		Swing		
Labour gain from Conservative		Swing		

=== Rhyl South East (three seats) ===
Rhyl South East 2012
Party	Candidate	Votes	%	±%
Labour	Brian Blakeley *	1,180	56.1	
Labour	Winifred Mullen-James	984		
Labour	William Tasker	972		
Conservative	Ian Gunning *	641	30.5	
Conservative	Peter Jackson	506		
Conservative	Anthony Thomas	452		
Independent	Daniel Murray	284	13.5	
Majority		331		
Turnout			34.2	
Registered electors		6,025		
Labour hold		Swing		
Labour gain from Conservative		Swing		
Labour gain from Conservative		Swing		

=== Rhyl South West (two seats) ===
Rhyl South West 2012
Party	Candidate	Votes	%	±%
Labour	Patricia Jones	797	68.2	
Labour	Margaret McCarrol	647		
Independent	David Thomas *	184	15.8	
Independent	Glyn Williams *	141		
Conservative	Harold Bennett	116	9.9	
Conservative	William Dawson	96		
Liberal Democrats	David Dear	71	6.1	
Majority		463		
Turnout			30.8	
Registered electors		3,725		
Labour hold		Swing		
Labour hold		Swing		

Previous Labour councillors stood as Independents.

=== Rhyl West (two seats) ===
Rhyl West 2012
Party	Candidate	Votes	%	±%
Labour	Joan Butterfield *	378	50.3	
Labour	Ian Armstrong *	361		
Independent	David Thomas	142	18.9	
Plaid Cymru	Norman Shone	125	16.6	
Conservative	Michael Espley	106	14.1	
Conservative	Paul Sumner	99		
Majority		219		
Turnout			20.0	
Registered electors		3,510		
Labour hold		Swing		
Labour hold		Swing		

=== Ruthin (three seats) ===
Ruthin 2012
Party	Candidate	Votes	%	±%
Independent	Huw Hilditch-Roberts	805	27.4	
Liberal Democrats	Robina Feeley *	804	27.4	
Independent	David Smith *	634		
Plaid Cymru	Hywel Richards	510	17.4	
Labour	Alun Pugh	473	16.1	
Independent	Patricia Astbury	426		
Plaid Cymru	Peter Ryder	346		
Conservative	Carole Roberts	342	11.7	
Independent	Richard Thomas	271		
Independent	Roger Parry	268		
Plaid Cymru	Shane Brennan	256		
Conservative	Joan Benton	178		
Conservative	John Broughton	119		
Majority		124		
Turnout			49.9	
Registered electors		4,366		
Independent gain from Plaid Cymru		Swing		
Liberal Democrats hold		Swing		
Independent hold		Swing		

=== St Asaph East (one seat) ===
St Asaph East 2012
Party	Candidate	Votes	%	±%
Conservative	Dewi Owens *	252	45.2	
Independent	John Smith	160	28.7	
Liberal Democrats	Linda Linaker	146	26.2	
Majority		92		
Turnout			40.0	
Registered electors		1,400		
Conservative hold		Swing		

=== St Asaph West (one seat) ===
St Asaph West 2012
Party	Candidate	Votes	%	±%
Independent	William Cowie *	181	46.8	
Labour	Richard Gumm	98	25.3	
Conservative	John Horden	98	25.3	
Liberal Democrats	Sean Hagan	10	2.6	
Majority		83		
Turnout			29.4	
Registered electors		1,326		
Independent hold		Swing		

=== Trefnant (one seat) ===
Trefnant 2012
Party	Candidate	Votes	%	±%
Plaid Cymru	Meirick Davies *	364	53.8	
Conservative	Leslie Rees	312	46.2	
Majority		52		
Turnout			43.8	
Registered electors		1,572		
Plaid Cymru hold		Swing		

=== Tremeirchion (one seat) ===
Tremeirchion 2012
Party	Candidate	Votes	%	±%
Independent	Barbara Smith *	313	54.2	
Conservative	Hugh Hughes	264	45.8	
Majority		49		
Turnout			44.2	
Registered electors		1,325		
Independent hold		Swing		

(a) Election Centre/Andrew Teale source also compares the percentage vote of the lead candidate for each party in the ward

(b) Prestatyn North result corrected by election petition

* = sitting ward councillor prior to election
