= List of places in Denbighshire (categorised) =

This is a categorised list of places in the principal area of Denbighshire, north Wales. See the list of places in Wales for places in other principal areas.

== Administrative divisions ==
=== Electoral wards ===
See the article on electoral wards for an explanation of this list.

- Bodelwyddan
- Corwen
- Denbigh Central
- Denbigh Lower
- Denbigh Upper/Henllan
- Dyserth
- Efenechtyd
- Llanarmon-yn-Ial/Llandegla
- Llanbedr Dyffryn Clwyd/Llangynhafal
- Llandrillo
- Llandyrnog
- Llanfair Dyffryn Clwyd/Gwyddelwern
- Llangollen
- Llanrhaeadr-yng-Nghinmeirch
- Prestatyn Central
- Prestatyn East
- Prestatyn Meliden
- Prestatyn North
- Prestatyn South West
- Rhuddlan
- Rhyl East
- Rhyl South
- Rhyl South East
- Rhyl South West
- Rhyl West
- Ruthin
- St Asaph East
- St Asaph West
- Trefnant
- Tremeirchion

=== Communities ===
This is a list of local communities:

- Aberwheeler
- Betws Gwerfil Goch
- Bodelwyddan
- Bodfari
- Bryneglwys
- Cefn Meiriadog
- Clocaenog
- Corwen
- Cwm
- Cyffylliog
- Cynwyd
- Denbigh
- Derwen
- Dyserth
- Efenechtyd
- Gwyddelwern
- Graianrhyd
- Henllan
- Llanarmon-yn-Ial
- Llanbedr Dyffryn Clwyd
- Llandegla
- Llandrillo
- Llandyrnog
- Llanelidan
- Llanfair Dyffryn Clwyd
- Llanferres
- Llangollen
- Llangynhafal
- Llanrhaeadr-yng-Nghinmeirch
- Llantysilio
- Llanynys
- Nantglyn
- Prestatyn
- Rhuddlan
- Rhyl
- Ruthin
- St Asaph
- Tafarn Y Gelyn
- Trefnant
- Tremeirchion
- Waen

== See also ==
- List of places in Denbighshire
