= 2008 Denbighshire County Council election =

Welsh local election

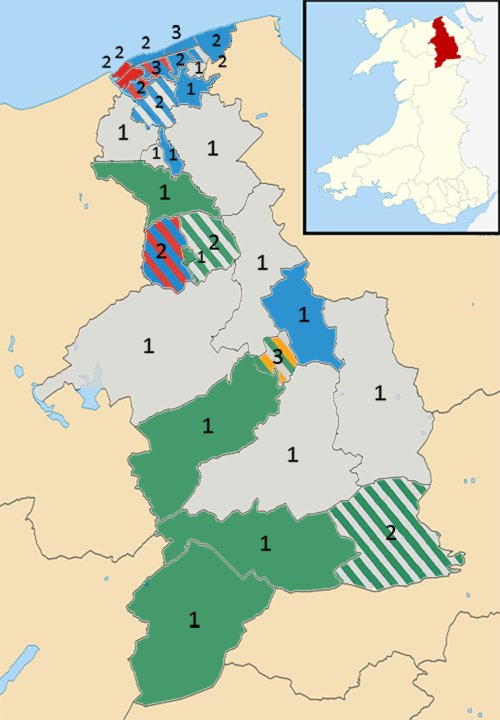
2008 election results map, showing numbers of councillors per ward and their party affiliations

The 2008 Denbighshire County Council election took place in Denbighshire, Wales, on 1 May 2008 to elect members of Denbighshire Council. This was the same day as other 2008 United Kingdom local elections. The previous elections took place in 2004 and the next all-council elections took place in 2012.

== Background ==
Six months before the election, the Independent council leader, Rhiannon Hughes, and her entire cabinet had been voted out of their positions, following the release of a critical schools report.

Contests in May 2008 took place in all of the 30 electoral wards.

== Results ==
=== Overview ===
The Conservatives became the largest group on the council after taking new seats, largely from Independent councillors.

Denbighshire County Council election 2008
Party	Seats	Gains	Losses	Net gain/loss	Seats %	Votes %	Votes	+/−
Conservative	18	11		+11	38.2	29.0	10,053	+11.5
Independent	13	1	8	-7	27.6	31.8	11,023	-5.0
Plaid Cymru	8	1		+1	17.0	15.1	5,237	-0.6
Labour	7		1	-1	14.9	16.0	5,548	-3.8
Liberal Democrats	1	1	2	-1	2.1	7.2	2,479	-0.3
DAW	0		3	-3	0.0	N/A	0	-2.7
UKIP	0			0	0.0	0.5	162	New
BNP	0	0	0	0	0.0	0.4	138	New

== Ward results ==
=== Bodelwyddan (one seat) ===
Bodelwyddan 2008 ^{(a)}
Party	Candidate	Votes	%	±%
Independent	Elizabeth Jones *	246	45.6	
Conservative	Nan Jones	190	35.2	
Independent	James Warner	104	19.3	
Majority		56		
Turnout			33.5	
Registered electors		1,628		
Independent hold		Swing		

=== Corwen (one seat) ===
Corwen 2008
Party	Candidate	Votes	%	±%
Plaid Cymru	Huw Jones	531	55.2	
Independent	Nigel Roberts *	311	32.3	
Conservative	John Broughton	77	8.0	
Independent	Anthony Dilworth	43	4.5	
Majority		220		
Turnout			51.2	
Registered electors		1,883		
Plaid Cymru gain from Independent		Swing		

=== Denbigh Central (one seat) ===
Denbigh Central 2008
Party	Candidate	Votes	%	±%
Plaid Cymru	Gwyneth Kensler *	256	45.0	
Independent	Peter Glynn	141	24.8	
Labour	Graham Maudsley	77	13.5	
Independent	Robert Parkes	62	10.9	
Liberal Democrats	Mary Young	33	5.8	
Majority		115		
Turnout			40.8	
Registered electors		1,410		
Plaid Cymru hold		Swing		

=== Denbigh Lower (two seats) ===
Denbigh Lower 2008
Party	Candidate	Votes	%	±%
Independent	John Bartley *	993	41.6	
Plaid Cymru	Neville Jones *	664	27.8	
Conservative	Dilwyn Edwards	471	19.7	
Labour	Robert Roberts	261	10.9	
Majority		193		
Turnout			41.8	
Registered electors		3,430		
Independent hold		Swing		
Plaid Cymru hold		Swing		

=== Denbigh Upper/Henllan (two seats) ===
Denbigh Upper/Henllan 2008
Party	Candidate	Votes	%	±%
Labour	Colin Hughes *	266	26.8	
Conservative	Jane Yorke	236	23.7	
Labour	Keith Stevens	219		
Independent	Jennifer Rowley-Williams	197	19.8	
Plaid Cymru	Jean Gwynn	193	19.4	
Plaid Cymru	Philip Williams	129		
Independent	Robb Jenkins	119		
Liberal Democrats	Colin L. Hughes *	102	10.3	
Liberal Democrats	John Larsen	96		
Majority		17		
Turnout			36.5	
Registered electors		2,484		
Labour hold		Swing		
Conservative gain from Liberal Democrats		Swing		

=== Dyserth (one seat) ===
Dyserth 2008
Party	Candidate	Votes	%	±%
Conservative	Peter Owen *	327	46.1	
Independent	Hugh Hughes	181	25.5	
Labour	Richard Gumm	87	12.3	
Liberal Democrats	Kenneth Prydderch	58	8.2	
Plaid Cymru	Arwel Roberts	56	7.9	
Majority		146		
Turnout			38.0	
Registered electors		1,881		
Conservative gain from Independent		Swing		

Peter Owen was previously elected as an independent, in 2004.

=== Efenechtyd (one seat) ===
Efenechtyd 2008
Party	Candidate	Votes	%	±%
Plaid Cymru	Eryl Williams *	397	54.9	
Independent	John Price	326	45.1	
Majority		71		
Turnout			55.9	
Registered electors		1,303		
Plaid Cymru hold		Swing		

=== Llanarmon-Yn-Lal/Llandelga (one seat) ===
Llanarmon-Yn-Lal/Llandelga 2008
Party	Candidate	Votes	%	±%
Independent	Christine Evans	514	47.5	
Liberal Democrats	Robert Barton *	285	26.3	
Conservative	Donald Holder	283	26.2	
Majority		229		
Turnout			57.1	
Registered electors		1,908		
Independent gain from Liberal Democrats		Swing		

=== Llanbedr Dyffryn Clwyd (one seat) ===
Llanbedr Dyffryn Clwyd 2008
Party	Candidate	Votes	%	±%
Conservative	Pauline Dobb	297	43.8	
Independent	Huw Williams	258	38.1	
Independent	Gwynfor Evans	87	12.8	
Labour	Mary Chaffé	36	5.3	
Majority		39		
Turnout			56.1	
Registered electors		1,209		
Conservative hold		Swing		

=== Llandrillo (one seat) ===
Llandrillo 2008
Party	Candidate	Votes	%	±%
Plaid Cymru	Cefyn Williams *	405	78.3	
Independent	David Robinson	93	18.0	
Conservative	Richard Wishart	19	3.7	
Majority		312		
Turnout			54.6	
Registered electors		962		
Plaid Cymru hold		Swing		

=== Llandyrnog (one seat) ===
Llandyrnog 2008
Party	Candidate	Votes	%	±%
Independent	Gwilym Evans *	469	56.5	
Liberal Democrats	Mark Young	361	43.5	
Majority		108		
Turnout			49.6	
Registered electors		1,678		
Independent hold		Swing		

=== Llanfair Dyffryn Clwyd Gwyddelwern (one seat) ===
Llanfair Dyffryn Clwyd Gwyddelwern 2008
Party	Candidate	Votes	%	±%
Independent	Hugh Evans *	690	69.9	
Independent	Dewi Jones	297	30.1	
Majority		393		
Turnout			53.6	
Registered electors		1,846		
Independent hold		Swing		

=== Llangollen (two seats) ===
Llangollen 2008
Party	Candidate	Votes	%	±%
Plaid Cymru	Trefor Hughes *	671	33.8	
Independent	Lucy Morris	613	30.9	
Independent	Stuart Davies *	491		
Conservative	Mark Pendlebury	383	19.3	
Labour	John Palmer	319	16.1	
Plaid Cymru	Jonathan Haddy	154		
Independent	Janet Wakefield	129		
Majority		32		
Turnout			46.6	
Registered electors		3,342		
Plaid Cymru hold		Swing		
Independent gain from Independent		Swing		

=== Llanrhaeadr-yng-Nghinmeirch (one seat) ===
Llanrhaeadr-yng-Nghinmeirch 2008
Party	Candidate	Votes	%	±%
Independent	Paul Marfleet *	455	56.5	
Plaid Cymru	Huw Williams	351	43.5	
Majority		104		
Turnout			53.1	
Registered electors		1,523		
Independent hold		Swing		

=== Prestatyn Central (two seats) ===
Prestatyn Central 2008
Party	Candidate	Votes	%	±%
Independent	Peter Duffy *	564	39.9	
Conservative	June Cahill	504	35.6	
Independent	Neville Jones *	450		
Conservative	Margaret Horobin	442		
Labour	Robert Kelly	180	12.7	
Liberal Democrats	Paul Penlington	167	11.8	
Independent	Colin Hall	124		
Majority		54		
Turnout			48.7	
Registered electors		2,736		
Independent hold		Swing		
Conservative gain from Independent		Swing		

=== Prestatyn East (two seats) ===
Prestatyn East 2008
Party	Candidate	Votes	%	±%
Conservative	James Davies *	847	72.6	
Conservative	Julian Thompson-Hill *	739		
Labour	Alan Marsden	320	27.4	
Majority		419		
Turnout			39.1	
Registered electors		3,100		
Conservative hold		Swing		
Conservative hold		Swing		

=== Prestatyn Meliden (one seat) ===
Prestatyn Meliden 2008
Party	Candidate	Votes	%	±%
Independent	Rhiannon Hughes *	307	44.7	
Conservative	Gerald Frobisher	210	30.6	
Labour	Peter Newell	154	22.4	
Liberal Democrats	Peter Newell	16	2.3	
Majority		97		
Turnout			44.7	
Registered electors		1,552		
Independent hold		Swing		

=== Prestatyn North (three seats) ===
Prestatyn North 2008
Party	Candidate	Votes	%	±%
Conservative	George Green	741	40.7	
Conservative	Allan Pennington	709		
Conservative	Michael Eckersley	696		
Independent	Michael German *	684	37.6	
Independent	Isobel German *	634		
Independent	David Cooper *	476		
Labour	Velma Wilshaw-Cryer	396	21.7	
Labour	Patricia Dawson	391		
Labour	Amanda Wiggan	366		
Majority		12		
Turnout			39.1	
Registered electors		4,695		
Conservative gain from DAW		Swing		
Conservative gain from DAW		Swing		
Conservative gain from DAW		Swing		

In 2008 the DAW councillors stood as Independents

=== Prestatyn South West (two seats) ===
Prestatyn South West 2008
Party	Candidate	Votes	%	±%
Conservative	Glyn Jones *	559	46.0	
Conservative	Sharon Frobisher *	524		
Labour	Paul Roberts	425	35.0	
Labour	Adrian West	385		
Liberal Democrats	Jonathon Bentley	232	19.1	
Majority		99		
Turnout			41.8	
Registered electors		2,820		
Conservative hold		Swing		
Conservative hold		Swing		

=== Rhuddlan (two seats) ===
Rhuddlan 2008
Party	Candidate	Votes	%	±%
Conservative	Janet Davies	671	47.0	
Independent	Selwyn Thomas *	497	34.8	
Independent	Gareth Rowlands *	422		
Independent	Stephen Rafferty	325		
Conservative	Melanie Jones	318		
Labour	George Williams	261	18.3	
Majority		75		
Turnout			49.4	
Registered electors		2,915		
Conservative gain from Independent		Swing		
Independent hold		Swing		

=== Rhyl East (two seats) ===
Rhyl East 2008
Party	Candidate	Votes	%	±%
Conservative	John Bellis	756	49.6	+49.6
Conservative	Diana Hannam *	581		
Labour	Margaret McCarroll	410	26.9	−16.9
Independent	Susan Roberts *	358	23.5	−32.7
Labour	William Tasker	353		
Majority		171		
Turnout			40.0	
Registered electors		3,721		
Conservative gain from Independent		Swing		
Conservative gain from Independent		Swing		

Councillor Hannam was previously elected as an independent.

=== Rhyl South (two seats) ===
Rhyl South 2008
Party	Candidate	Votes	%	±%
Conservative	David Lee	674	45.1	+19.8
Labour	Jeanette Chamberlain-Jones *	574	38.4	+4.4
Conservative	Lynette Edwards	568		
Labour	Brian Moylan	386		
Plaid Cymru	Alun Edwards	248	16.6	−1.4
Majority		6		
Turnout			43.8	
Registered electors		3,083		
Conservative hold		Swing		
Labour hold		Swing		

=== Rhyl South East (three seats) ===
Rhyl South East 2008
Party	Candidate	Votes	%	±%
Conservative	Ian Gunning	826	38.7	+38.7
Labour	Brian Blakeley *	823	38.6	−12.4
Conservative	Carl Davies	766		
Labour	Glyn Pickering *	746		
Conservative	Paul Sumner	714		
Labour	Barry Mellor	673		
Plaid Cymru	Stephen Marlor	247	11.6	+11.6
Independent	Hugh Jones *	238	11.2	−37.8
Independent	Martin Gibson	121		
Majority		20		
Turnout			33.8	
Registered electors		5,935		
Conservative gain from Labour		Swing		
Labour hold		Swing		
Conservative gain from Independent		Swing		

=== Rhyl South West (two seats) ===
Rhyl South West 2008
Party	Candidate	Votes	%	±%
Labour	David Thomas *	587	59.2	−4.9
Labour	Glyn Williams *	532		
Conservative	Christopher Geddes	267	26.9	+26.9
Conservative	Maria Espley	266		
BNP	Ian Si'ree	138	13.9	+13.9
Majority		265		
Turnout			29.9	
Registered electors		3,560		
Labour hold		Swing		
Labour hold		Swing		

=== Rhyl West (two seats) ===
Rhyl West 2008
Party	Candidate	Votes	%	±%
Labour	Joan Butterfield *	276	35.6	−23.7
Labour	Ian Armstrong	236		
Independent	Colin Jones	195	25.1	−15.6
Independent	Mark Webster *	188		
Conservative	Michael Espley	175	22.6	+22.6
Conservative	Linda Gordon	163		
Liberal Democrats	Columbus McCormack	130	16.8	+16.8
Majority		41		
Turnout			23.5	
Registered electors		3,494		
Labour hold		Swing		
Labour hold		Swing		

Mark Webster had been elected as a Labour councillor in 2004.

=== Ruthin (three seats) ===
Ruthin 2008
Party	Candidate	Votes	%	±%
Independent	David Smith	992	26.1	
Liberal Democrats	Robina Feeley	978	25.7	
Plaid Cymru	Morfudd Jones *	887	23.3	
Independent	Elwyn Edwards *	861		
Conservative	Richard Costain	789	20.7	
UKIP	Warwick Nicholson	162	4.3	
Majority		26		
Turnout			49.9	
Registered electors		4,197		
Independent hold		Swing		
Liberal Democrats gain from Independent		Swing		
Plaid Cymru hold		Swing		

=== St Asaph East (one seat) ===
St Asaph East 2008
Party	Candidate	Votes	%	±%
Conservative	Dewi Owens *	333	58.3	
Independent	David Roberts	145	25.4	
Independent	Charles Leach	93	16.3	
Majority		288		
Turnout			42.4	
Registered electors		1,348		
Conservative hold		Swing		

=== St Asaph West (one seat) ===
St Asaph West 2008
Party	Candidate	Votes	%	±%
Independent	William Cowie	209	46.4	
Independent	John Smith *	128	28.4	
Conservative	John Horden	113	25.1	
Majority		81		
Turnout			33.9	
Registered electors		1,337		
Independent gain from Independent		Swing		

=== Trefnant (one seat) ===
Trefnant 2008
Party	Candidate	Votes	%	±%
Plaid Cymru	Meirick Davies *	331	45.2	
Conservative	David Dudley	305	41.7	
Labour	Stephen Ellison	96	13.1	
Majority		26		
Turnout			48.4	
Registered electors		1,525		
Plaid Cymru hold		Swing		

=== Tremeirchion (one seat) ===
Tremeirchion 2008
Party	Candidate	Votes	%	±%
Independent	Barbara Smith	309	47.5	
Independent	Robert Williams *	224	34.5	
Liberal Democrats	Rhodri Jones	117	18.0	
Majority		85		
Turnout			51.1	
Registered electors		1,280		
Independent gain from Independent		Swing		

(a) Election Centre/Andrew Teale source also compares the percentage vote of the lead candidate for each party in the ward

* = sitting councillor in this ward prior to election
