= Denbighshire County Council =

Local government authority in central north Wales

Denbighshire County Council Cyngor Sir Ddinbych (Welsh)

Type
- Type: Principal council of Denbighshire

History
- Founded: 1 April 1996
- Preceded by: Clwyd County Council; Rhuddlan; Glyndŵr (part); Colwyn (part)

Leadership
- Chair: Bobby Feeley, Liberal Democrat since 13 May 2026
- Leader: Hugh Evans, Independent since 8 September 2026
- Chief Executive: Helen White since 19 January 2026

Structure
- Seats: 48 councillors
- Graph of the party split among 44 seats.
- Political groups: Administration (19) Independent (10) Conservative (8) Liberal Democrats (1) Other parties (25) Labour (13) Plaid Cymru (7) Green (2) Reform (1) Independent (2)
- Length of term: 5 years

Elections
- Voting system: First-past-the-post
- First election: 4 May 1995
- Last election: 5 May 2022
- Next election: 6 May 2027

Meeting place
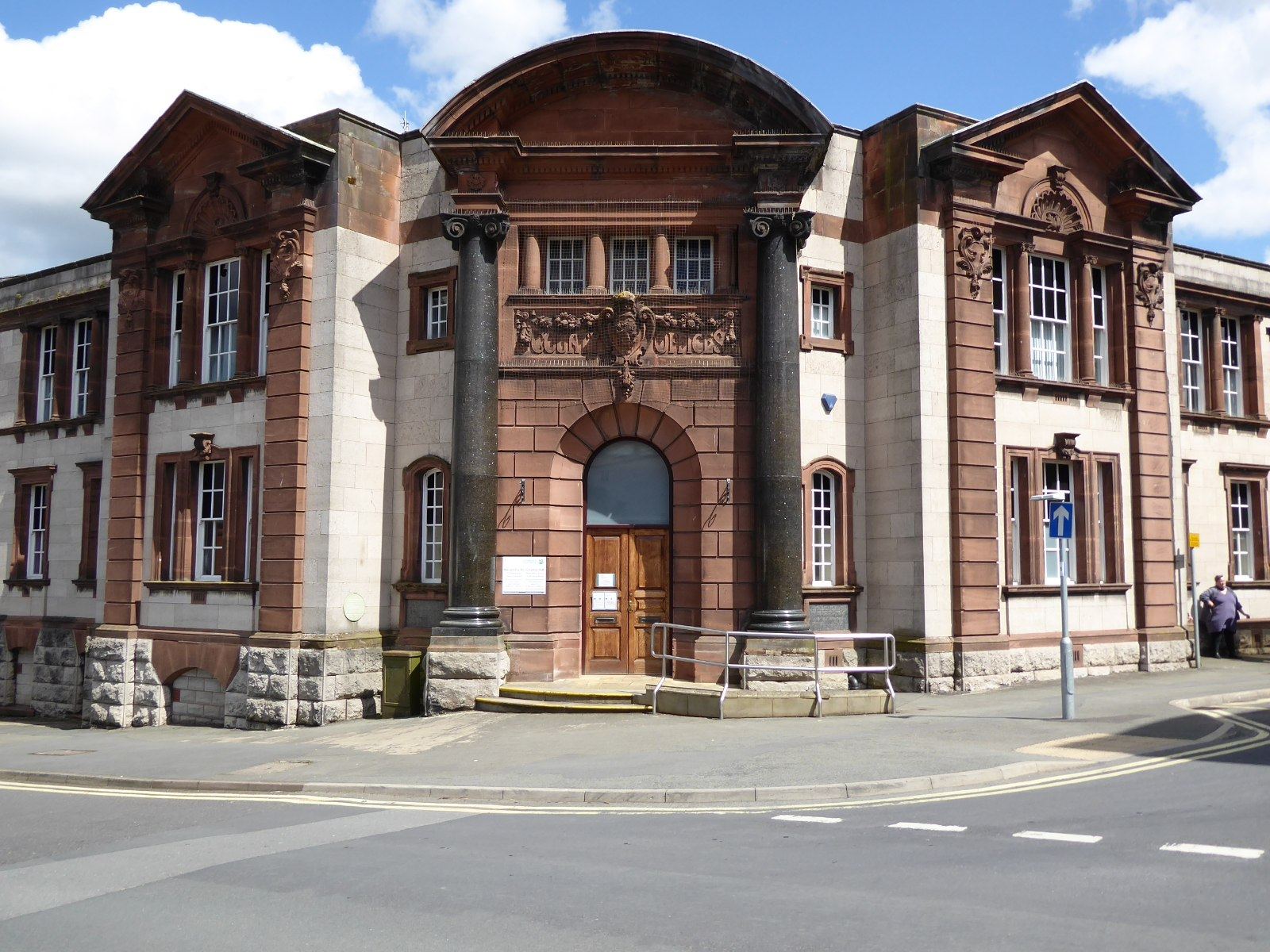
- County Hall, Wynnstay Road, Ruthin, LL15 1YN

Website
- www.denbighshire.gov.uk

Denbighshire County Council (Welsh: Cyngor Sir Ddinbych) is the local authority for the county of Denbighshire, one of the principal areas of Wales. The council is based at County Hall in Ruthin. There have been two bodies called Denbighshire County Council. The first existed from 1889 until 1974, and the current one was created in 1996.

Elections take place every five years. The last election was on 5 May 2022. The council is under no overall control. Since September 2026 it has been led by independent councillor Hugh Evans, with a cabinet comprising independent councillors, Conservatives, and a Liberal Democrat.

== History ==
Elected county councils were established in 1889 under the Local Government Act 1888, taking over administrative functions previously performed by unelected magistrates at each county's quarter sessions. County boundaries were adjusted at the same time such that each urban sanitary district which straddled county boundaries was placed entirely in the county which had the majority of the district's population. There were two such districts on Denbighshire's borders; Denbighshire gained the part of Colwyn Bay which had been in Caernarfonshire, but ceded a small part of Rhyl to Flintshire.

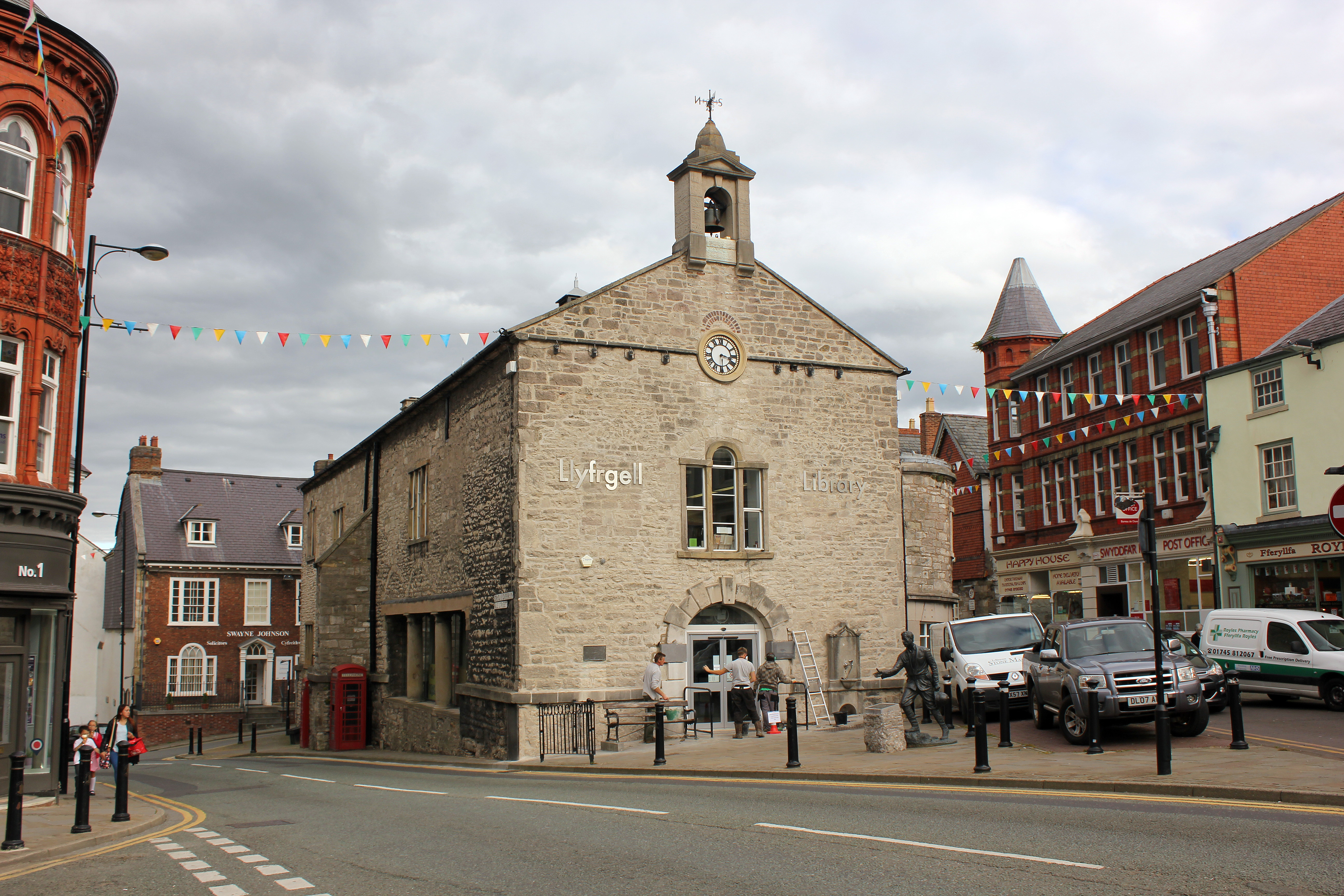
County Hall, Denbigh: One of the first County Council's meeting places

The first elections were held in January 1889. The council formally came into being on 1 April 1889, on which day it held its first meeting at the County Buildings, Wrexham, one of the county's courthouses. Thomas Gee, a Liberal, was the first chairman of the council. At that first meeting, the council debated where future meetings should be held. It was decided that the county council would meet alternately at Denbigh and Wrexham. When meeting in Denbigh, the council met at the County Hall there, another of the county's courthouses (built 1572).

At a subsequent meeting in 1891, the council decided to hold its meetings in rotation at Denbigh, Ruthin and Wrexham. Colwyn Bay was added to the cycle of places where the council met in 1900. The council then held its regular meetings in rotation at Denbigh, Colwyn Bay, Ruthin and Wrexham until the abolition of the first incarnation of the county council in 1974. Although the council held its meetings in multiple towns, it decided to consolidate its main offices in a central location. It therefore built the County Offices at Ruthin, which opened in 1909.

That county council and the administrative county of Denbighshire were abolished in 1974, when the area merged with neighbouring Flintshire to become the new county of Clwyd, except for six parishes on the western edge of Denbighshire in the Conwy valley, which went instead to the Aberconwy district of Gwynedd. The remainder of the former administrative county of Denbighshire was split between three of the six districts of Clwyd: Colwyn, Glyndŵr, and Wrexham Maelor.

Under the Local Government (Wales) Act 1994, Clwyd County Council and the county's constituent districts were abolished, being replaced by principal areas, whose councils perform the functions which had previously been divided between the county and district councils. A new principal area and county of Denbighshire was created with effect from 1 April 1996, covering most of Glyndŵr, two communities from Colwyn, and all of Rhuddlan (the latter having been created in 1974 from areas in Flintshire rather than Denbighshire). The new Denbighshire County Council created in 1996 therefore covers a different area to the pre-1974 county.

== Political control ==
The council has been under no overall control since its creation in 1996. A Labour and Plaid Cymru coalition formed to run the council following the May 2022 election. That coalition broke down in August 2026 and the Labour leader of the council, Jason McLellan, resigned. In September 2026, independent councillor Hugh Evans was appointed the new leader of the council, having previously held the role between 2007 and 2022. He subsequently appointed a cabinet comprising independent councillors, Conservatives and the council's one Liberal Democrat. (Note: The Liberal Democrat councillor, Bobby Feeley, sits in the Independent Group.)

The first election to the new council was held in 1995. It initially operated as a shadow authority alongside the outgoing authorities until coming into its powers on 1 April 1996. Political control of the council since 1996 has been as follows:

Party in control	Years
No overall control	1996–present

=== Leadership ===
The leaders of the council since 2000 have been:

Councillor	Party	From	To
Elwyn Edwards	Independent	6 Jun 2000	14 May 2002
Eryl Williams	Plaid Cymru	14 May 2002	24 Jun 2004
Rhiannon Hughes	Independent	24 Jun 2004	22 Oct 2007
Hugh Evans	Independent	6 Nov 2007	May 2022
Jason McLellan	Labour	24 May 2022	28 Aug 2026
Hugh Evans	Independent	8 Sep 2026	

From April 2022 the council leader was paid a salary of £53,550.

=== Composition ===
Following the 2022 election and subsequent by-elections and changes of allegiance up to October 2026, the composition of the council was:

Party	Seats
Labour	13
Conservative	8
Plaid Cymru	7
Green	2
Liberal Democrats	1
Reform	1
Independent	12
Total	44

The Liberal Democrat and nine of the independent councillors sit together as the 'Independent Group'. Another four independent councillors form the 'Denbighshire Independent Alliance' group, and the other three independents are not aligned to any group. Cabinet positions are held by Conservatives, members of the Independent Group (including the Liberal Democrat) and one of the non-aligned independents. The next election is due in 2027.

One seat (Alyn Valley, Con) was elected unopposed at the 2022 election.

== Elections ==
The last council-wide election was held on 5 May 2022, when the number of councillors elected increased from 47 to 48.

Summary of the council composition after council elections, click on the year for full details of each election.

Year	Seats	Labour	Independent	Plaid Cymru	Conservative	Green	Liberal Democrats	Notes
1995	49	**20**	19	7	0	0	3	
1999	47	13	**23** (Note: Includes five candidates elected to represent the Democratic Alliance of Wales.)	8	2	0	1	New ward boundaries.
2004	47	8	**23** (Note: Includes three candidates elected to represent the Democratic Alliance of Wales.)	7	7	0	2	
2008	47	7	13	8	**18**	0	1	
2012	47	**18**	12	7	9	0	1	
2017	47	13	8	9	**16**	0	1	
2022	48	**19**	12	8	6	2	1	New ward boundaries.

Party with the most elected councillors in bold. Coalition agreements in notes column.

== Premises ==
The council is based at County Hall in Ruthin. The building was originally built in 1909 as offices for the old Denbighshire County Council, and was initially called County Offices. Between 1974 and 1996 the building served as the headquarters of Glyndŵr District Council. Most of the building was demolished in 2002 and a modern building called County Hall built behind the retained frontage of the 1909 original, with the rebuilt headquarters being completed in 2004. The council also has offices at Russell House on Churton Road in Rhyl, which had been built in 1991 for the former Rhuddlan Borough Council.

== Electoral divisions ==
The county borough is divided into 29 electoral wards returning 48 councillors. Few communities in Denbighshire are coterminous with electoral wards. The following table lists council wards, communities and associated geographical areas based on the 2017 election:

Ward	County Councillors	Communities (and community wards)	
Bodelwyddan ^{c}	1	Bodelwyddan (town) *	
Corwen ^{c}	1	Corwen (town) *	
Denbigh Central	1	Denbigh (town)	(Central ward)
Denbigh Lower	2	Denbigh (town)	(Lower ward)
Denbigh Upper/Henllan	2	Denbigh (town)	(Upper ward)
Denbigh Upper/Henllan	2	Henllan	
Dyserth ^{c}	1	Dyserth *	
Efenechtyd	1	Betws Gwerfil Goch *; Clocaenog *; Derwen *; Efenechtyd *	
Llanarmon-yn-Ial/Llandegla	1	Llanarmon-yn-Ial *; Llandegla *; Llanferres *	
Llanbedr Dyffryn Clwyd/Llangynhafal	1	Llanbedr Dyffryn Clwyd *; Llangynhafal *	
Llandrillo	1	Cynwyd *; Llandrillo *	
Llandyrnog	1	Aberwheeler *; Llandyrnog *; Llanynys *	
Llanfair Dyffryn Clwyd/Gwyddelwern	1	Bryneglwys *; Gwyddelwern *; Llanelidan *; Llanfair Dyffryn Clwyd *	
Llangollen	2	Llangollen (town) *; Llantysilio *	
Llanrhaeadr-yng-Nghinmeirch	1	Cyffylliog *; Llanrhaeadr-yng-Nghinmeirch*; Nantglyn *	
Prestatyn Central	2	Prestatyn (town)	(Central ward)
Prestatyn East	2	Prestatyn (town)	(East ward)
Prestatyn Meliden	1	Prestatyn (town)	(Meliden ward)
Prestatyn North	3	Prestatyn (town)	(North and North West wards)
Prestatyn South West	2	Prestatyn (town)	(South West ward)
Rhuddlan ^{c}	2	Rhuddlan (town)	
Rhyl East	2	Rhyl (town)	(East ward)
Rhyl South	2	Rhyl (town)	(South ward)
Rhyl South East	3	Rhyl (town)	(South East ward)
Rhyl South West	2	Rhyl (town)	(South West ward)
Rhyl West	2	Rhyl (town)	(West ward)
Ruthin ^{c}	3	Ruthin (town)	
St. Asaph East	1	St. Asaph (town)	(East ward)
St. Asaph West	1	St. Asaph (town)	(West ward)
Trefnant	1	Cefn Meiriadog *; Trefnant *	
Tremeirchion	1	Bodfari *; Cwm; Tremeirchion *; Waen *	

* = Communities which elect a community council
^{c} = Ward coterminous with community of the same name

== Democratic Alliance of Wales ==
The Democratic Alliance of Wales (DAW) was a political party partly comprising former Labour Party members,

The DAW stood 14 candidates in the 1999 Denbighshire Council election, with five winning seats in Prestatyn. The three successful DAW candidates in Prestatyn North—Michael German, Isobel German and Jeff Hughes—had been elected as Labour councillors at the 1995 elections. One of the DAW founders, Gwynn Clague, was elected as a county councillor for Prestatyn South West, and became mayor of Prestatyn Town Council. He was particularly known for his criticisms of the county council's performance, as well as the town council's finances. By October 2003, he had left DAW and was unaligned.

At the 2004 all-council election, the three DAW councillors in the Prestatyn North ward stood for re-election, retaining their seats.

Following the rejection of Denbighshire council leader Rhiannon Hughes in October 2007, DAW group leader Mike German was touted as a possible successor.

At the 2008 all-council election, the three remaining DAW councillors stood as independents, losing to the Conservatives.
