= 2022 Denbighshire County Council election =

Welsh local election

- 5 May 2022

All 48 seats to Denbighshire County Council 25 seats needed for a majority

	First party	Second party	Third party
Party	Labour	Independent	Plaid Cymru
Seats won	19	12	8
Seat change	▲3	▲4	Steady
	Fourth party	Fifth party	Sixth party
Party	Conservative	Green	Liberal Democrats
Seats won	6	2	1
Seat change	▼9	▲2	Steady
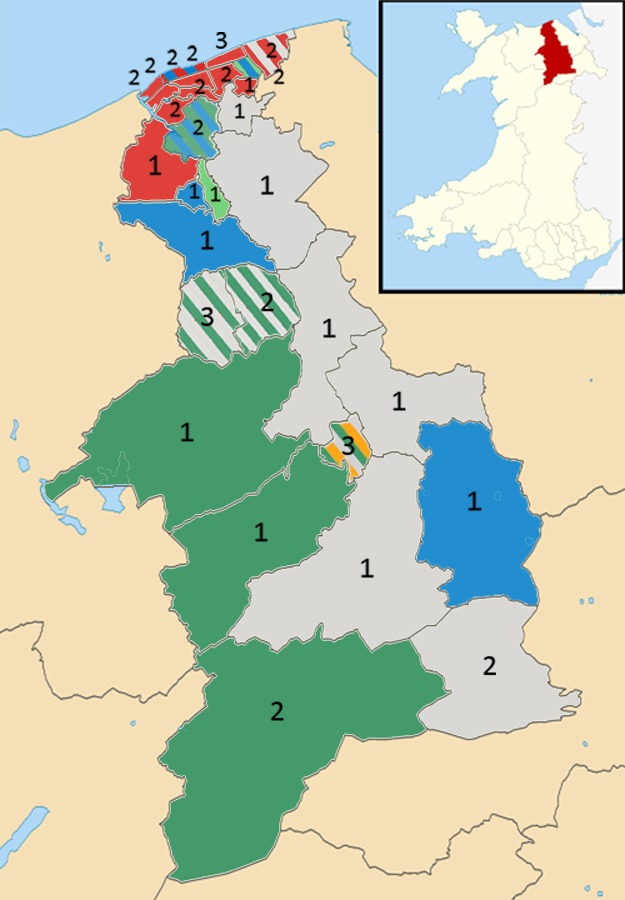
- 2022 election results map, showing numbers of councillors per ward and their party affiliations. Striped wards show mixed representation.

The 2022 election to Denbighshire County Council took place on 5 May 2022 as part of the 2022 Welsh local elections. The previous elections took place in May 2017 and the next are scheduled to happen in 2027

== Ward changes ==
Following a ward boundary review by the Local Democracy and Boundary Commission for Wales, the number of Denbighshire County Council wards was reduced from 30 to 29, while the number of councillors increased from 47 to 48. Twenty three wards saw no change, though other wards had their boundaries redrawn and/or their names changed.

== Results ==
No party gained an overall majority, though the Labour Party became the largest group. The Conservative Party lost nine seats, including that of their Group leader, Julian Thompson-Hill. The council gained its first ever representatives from the Green Party, who won seats in Prestatyn Central and St Asaph East. The overall turnout was 38.6%.

Results
Party	Seats	Change
Labour Party	19	▲3
Independents	12	▲4
Plaid Cymru	8	Steady
Conservative Party	6	▼9
Green Party	2	▲2
Liberal Democrats	1	Steady

== Ward results ==
* = denotes councillor elected to this ward at the 2017 elections

Denbighshire Council results per ward also give the number of registered electors

=== Alyn Valley (one seat) ===
Alyn Valley 2022
Party	Candidate	Votes	%	±%
Conservative	Terry Mendies	unopposed		
Registered electors				
Conservative win (new seat)				

Mendies stood unsuccessfully in the Trefnant ward in 2017. Alyn Valley is a new ward, formerly part of the Llanarmon-yn-Ial/Llandegla ward.

=== Bodelwyddan (one seat) ===
Bodelwyddan 2022
Party	Candidate	Votes	%	±%
Labour	Raj Metri	384	57.4	
Conservative	Abigail Mainon	285	42.6	
Registered electors		1,653		
Labour gain from Conservative		Swing		

=== Denbigh Caledfryn Henllan (three seats) ===
Denbigh Caledfryn Henllan 2022
Party	Candidate	Votes	%	±%
Independent	Pauline Edwards	630		
Plaid Cymru	Delyth Jones	531		
Independent	Geraint Lloyd-Williams	513		
Independent	Keith Stevens	513		
Plaid Cymru	Sian Vaughan Jones	497		
Conservative	Lara Pritchard	191		
Conservative	Gerry Frobisher	172		
Conservative	Ben Stanley	142		
Registered electors		3,759		
Independent win (new seat)				
Plaid Cymru win (new seat)				
Independent win (new seat)				

The former wards of Denbigh Central and Denbigh Upper/Henllan were merged, following the local government boundary review, becoming Denbigh Caledfryn Henllan. The ward retained the overall number of three councillors. Lloyd-Williams had been elected as a Labour councillor for Denbigh Upper/Henllan at the 2017 elections.

=== Denbigh Lower (two seats) ===
Denbigh Lower 2022
Party	Candidate	Votes	%	±%
Independent	Mark Young *	992		
Plaid Cymru	Rhys Thomas *	886		
Conservative	Gwynn Jones	329		
Conservative	Maxime Boucknooghe	286		
Registered electors		3,654		
Independent hold		Swing		
Plaid Cymru hold		Swing		

=== Dyserth (one seat) ===
Dyserth 2022
Party	Candidate	Votes	%	±%
Independent	David Williams *	534	79.1	
Conservative	Alan Pennington	141	20.9	
Registered electors		2,025		
Independent hold		Swing		

=== Efenechdyd (one seat) ===
Efenechdyd 2022
Party	Candidate	Votes	%	±%
Plaid Cymru	Eryl Williams *	426	79.0	
Conservative	Glen Vernon	113	21.0	
Registered electors		1,345		
Plaid Cymru hold		Swing		

Ward boundaries remained the same, but the official name of the ward was changed from Efenechtyd to Efenechdyd.

=== Edeirnion (two seats) ===
Edeirnion 2022
Party	Candidate	Votes	%	±%
Plaid Cymru	Alan Hughes	821		
Plaid Cymru	Gwyneth Ellis	719		
Labour	Gordon Hughes	365		
Conservative	Judith Hickey	143		
Conservative	Helen Jones	111		
Registered electors		2,785		
Plaid Cymru win (new seat)				
Plaid Cymru win (new seat)				

Formed from the merger of the former Corwen and Llandrillo wards.

=== Llandyrnog (one seat) ===
Llandyrnog 2022
Party	Candidate	Votes	%	±%
Independent	Merfyn Parry *	556	70.1	
Independent	John McGuire	152	19.2	
Conservative	Nicholas Garnett	85	10.7	
Registered electors		1,791		
Independent hold		Swing		

=== Llanfair Dyffryn Clwyd Gwyddelwern (one seat) ===
Llanfair Dyffryn Clwyd Gwyddelwern 2022
Party	Candidate	Votes	%	±%
Independent	Hugh Evans *	591	67.2	
Conservative	Philip Spencer Brelsford	146	16.6	
Green	Alex Collins	143	16.3	
Registered electors		1,911		
Independent hold		Swing		

=== Llangollen (two seats) ===
Llangollen 2022
Party	Candidate	Votes	%	±%
Independent	Karen Edwards	626		
Independent	Paul Keddie	623		
Green	Sarah Marshall	543		
Independent	Stuart Davies	445		
Conservative	Dawn Butters	130		
Conservative	Roger Jarvis	106		
Registered electors		3,355		
Independent gain from Labour		Swing		
Independent hold		Swing		

=== Llanrhaeadr-yng-Nghinmeirch (one seat) ===
Llanrhaeadr-yng-Nghinmeirch 2022
Party	Candidate	Votes	%	±%
Plaid Cymru	Huw Elfed Williams	497	69.4	
Conservative	David Murfitt	219	30.6	
Registered electors		1,509		
Plaid Cymru gain from Independent		Swing		

=== Moel Famau (one seat) ===
Moel Famau 2022
Party	Candidate	Votes	%	±%
Independent	Huw Williams	588	67.1	
Conservative	Pat Astbury	288	32.9	
Registered electors		1,807		
Independent win (new seat)				

Moel Famau was a new ward, formed by the merger of the former Llanbedr Dyffryn Clwyd/Llangynhafal ward and the community of Llanferres. Huw Williams had been elected as a Conservative councillor for Llanbedr Dyffryn Clwyd/Llangynhafal at the 2017 elections.

=== Prestatyn Central (two seats) ===
Prestatyn Central 2022
Party	Candidate	Votes	%	±%
Green	Jon Harland	806		
Conservative	Hugh Irving *	387		
Labour	Bob Murray	386		
Conservative	Elizabeth Tina Jones *	328		
Green	Robert Spalding	289		
Independent	Rory Fraser	64		
Registered electors		2,871		
Green gain from Conservative		Swing		
Conservative hold		Swing		

=== Prestatyn East (two seats) ===
Prestatyn East 2022
Party	Candidate	Votes	%	±%
Independent	Andrea Myatt Tomlin	597		
Labour	Elen Heaton	563		
Conservative	Anthon Sampson *	462		
Conservative	Julian Thompson-Hill *	396		
Registered electors		3,207		
Independent gain from Conservative		Swing		
Labour gain from Conservative		Swing		

=== Prestatyn Meliden (one seat) ===
Prestatyn Meliden 2022
Party	Candidate	Votes	%	±%
Labour	Julie Matthews	320	60.7	
Conservative	Carol Lloyd Evans	207	39.3	
Registered electors		1,556		
Labour gain from Independent		Swing		

=== Prestatyn North (three seats) ===
Prestatyn North 2022
Party	Candidate	Votes	%	±%
Labour	Kelly Clewett	733		
Labour	Jason McLellan	696		
Labour	Gill German	682		
Conservative	Tony Flynn *	507		
Conservative	Rachel Flynn *	470		
Conservative	Sharon Frobisher	405		
Plaid Cymru	Paul Penlington *	380		
Other	Peter Duffy	344		
Other	Mike German	310		
Plaid Cymru	Sonia Penlington	278		
Other	Helen Marsden-Duffy	255		
Plaid Cymru	Robert Niven Forrest	250		
Registered electors		4,809		
Labour gain from Conservative		Swing		
Labour gain from Conservative		Swing		
Labour hold		Swing		

Paul Penlington was elected in 2017 for the Labour Party.

=== Prestatyn South West (two seats) ===
Prestatyn South West 2022
Party	Candidate	Votes	%	±%
Labour	Gareth Sandilands	691		
Labour	Carol Holliday	657		
Conservative	Gary Brockbanks	423		
Conservative	Eddy Oko-Jaja	317		
Registered electors		2,895		
Labour gain from Conservative		Swing		
Labour hold		Swing		

=== Rhuddlan (two seats) ===
Rhuddlan 2022
Party	Candidate	Votes	%	±%
Conservative	Ann Davies *	586		
Plaid Cymru	Arwel Roberts *	512		
Labour	Val Simmons	385		
Conservative	Ivor Beech	329		
Plaid Cymru	Bleddyn Rhys	209		
Independent	Dave Farrall	164		
Registered electors		3,073		
Conservative hold		Swing		
Plaid Cymru hold		Swing		

=== Rhyl East (two seats) ===
Rhyl East 2022
Party	Candidate	Votes	%	±%
Labour	Barry Mellor *	591		
Conservative	Justine Evans	497		
Conservative	Tony Thomas *	492		
Labour	Jacqueline McAlpine	472		
Independent	Michael Joseph Jones	184		
Registered electors		3,656		
Labour hold		Swing		
Conservative hold		Swing		

=== Rhyl South (two seats) ===
Rhyl South 2022
Party	Candidate	Votes	%	±%
Labour	Jeanette Chamberlain-Jones *	661		
Labour	Ellie Chard *	605		
Conservative	David Thomas	395		
Conservative	Gloria Lambert	394		
Registered electors		2,914		
Labour hold		Swing		
Labour hold		Swing		

=== Rhyl South West (two seats) ===
Rhyl South West 2022
Party	Candidate	Votes	%	±%
Labour	Diane King	529		
Labour	Peter Prendergast *	492		
Conservative	Matt Bamber	246		
Conservative	Lee Bowen	241		
Independent	James Alexander Ball	122		
Registered electors		3,787		
Labour hold		Swing		
Labour hold		Swing		

=== Rhyl Trellewellyn (two seats) ===
Rhyl Trellewellyn 2022
Party	Candidate	Votes	%	±%
Labour	Win Mullen-James	453	47.8	
Labour	Michelle Walker	445		
Independent	Rich Kendrick	333		
Conservative	Matthew Woodfine	199	29.8	
Conservative	Leslie Clark Peake	192		
Plaid Cymru	John Hughes-Jones	142		
Registered electors		3,087		
Labour win (new seat)				
Labour win (new seat)				

The former ward of Rhyl South East was divided, following the local government boundary review, into Rhyl Trellewellyn and Rhyl Ty Newydd, with an overall increase of councillors from three to four. The two wards match the boundaries of the Trellewellyn and Ty Newydd wards to Rhyl Town Council.

=== Rhyl Ty Newydd (two seats) ===
Rhyl Ty Newydd 2022
Party	Candidate	Votes	%	±%
Labour	Brian Blakeley	682		
Labour	Cheryl Williams	612		
Conservative	Brian Jones	465		
Conservative	Noel Martin	396		
Registered electors		3,348		
Labour win (new seat)				
Labour win (new seat)				

Jones had previously been a councillor for the former Rhyl South East ward and had also been a cabinet member in the Conservative administration. Blakeley and Williams were also previously councillors for Rhyl South East.

=== Rhyl West (two seats) ===
Rhyl West 2017
Party	Candidate	Votes	%	±%
Labour	Joan Butterfield *	420		
Labour	Alan James *	389		
Conservative	Matthew Lambert	104		
Conservative	Jason Humphreys	98		
Independent	Trevor Tyrie	76		
Registered electors		3,187		
Labour hold		Swing		
Labour hold		Swing		

=== Ruthin (three seats) ===
Ruthin 2022
Party	Candidate	Votes	%	±%
Independent	Huw Hilditch-Roberts *	1,488		
Plaid Cymru	Emrys Wynne *	1,396		
Liberal Democrats	Bobby Feeley *	999		
Independent	Gavin Harris	931		
Green	Ted Stacey	282		
Conservative	Rachel Ryland	207		
Conservative	Curtis Wheaver	112		
Conservative	Joseph Furnival	108		
Registered electors		4,437		
Independent hold		Swing		
Plaid Cymru hold		Swing		
Liberal Democrats hold		Swing		

=== St Asaph East (one seat) ===
St Asaph East 2022
Party	Candidate	Votes	%	±%
Green	Martyn James Hogg	310	53.4	
Conservative	Linda Nelson	270	46.6	
Registered electors		1,546		
Green gain from Conservative		Swing		

=== St Asaph West (one seat) ===
St Asaph West 2022
Party	Candidate	Votes	%	±%
Conservative	Peter Scott	222	61.4	
Independent	Peter Morton	139	38.6	
Registered electors		1,276		
Conservative hold		Swing		

=== Trefnant (one seat) ===
Trefnant 2022
Party	Candidate	Votes	%	±%
Conservative	James Elson	330	50.9	
Plaid Cymru	Meirick Davies *	318	41.1	
Registered electors		1,538		
Conservative gain from Plaid Cymru		Swing		

=== Tremeirchion (one seat) ===
Tremeirchion 2022
Party	Candidate	Votes	%	±%
Independent	Chris Evans	272	39.7	
Independent	Mike Pritchard	209	30.5	
Conservative	Ceri Elizabeth Mearns	204	29.8	
Registered electors		1,365		
Independent gain from Conservative		Swing		

== Changes 2022–2027 ==
=== Affiliation changes ===
- Jeanette Chamberlain-Jones, elected as a Labour councillor for Rhyl South ward, left the party in Summer 2022.

=== By-elections ===
Rhyl Ty Newydd by-election, 9 February 2023
Party	Candidate	Votes	%	±%
Conservative	Brian Jones	337	40.1	
Labour	Jacqueline Lynda McAlpine	326	38.8	
Plaid Cymru	John Hughes-Jones	101	12.0	
Independent	Simon Rowlands	72	8.6	
Liberal Democrats	Keith Richard Kirwan	5	0.6	
Registered electors		3,290		
Conservative gain from Labour		Swing		

The Rhyl Ty Newydd by-election was triggered by the death of Labour councillor Brian Blakeley.

Rhyl South West by-election, 7 December 2023
Party	Candidate	Votes	%	±%
Labour	James May	236	51.3	
Independent	David Lee Thomas	153	33.3	
Conservative	Leslie Peake	71	15.4	
Registered electors		3,725		
Labour hold				

By-election triggered by the death of Labour councillor Pete Prendergast.

Rhyl Trellewelyn: 26 September 2024
Party	Candidate	Votes	%	±%
Conservative	Will Price	188	50.8	+33.1
Labour	Mike Blackwell	127	34.3	–5.9
Plaid Cymru	Bleddyn Rhys	36	9.7	–2.9
Liberal Democrats	Andrew Morris	19	5.1	N/A
Majority		61	16.5	N/A
Turnout		370	11.5	
Registered electors		3,213		
Conservative gain from Labour		Swing	▲19.5	

By-election triggered by the death of Labour councillor Win Mullen-James.

Prestatyn North by-election, 24 October 2024
Party	Candidate	Votes	%	±%
Conservative	Anton Sampson	295	25.9	
Independent	Tony Flynn	221	19.4	
Reform	Gerry Frobisher	218	19.2	
Labour	Neil Gibson	212	18.6	
Plaid Cymru	Paul Penlington	169	14.9	
Liberal Democrats	Keith Richard Kirwan	23	2.0	
Registered electors		4,762		
Conservative gain from Labour		Swing		

By-election triggered by the resignation of Labour councillor Gill German.
