= 2017 Denbighshire County Council election =

Welsh local election

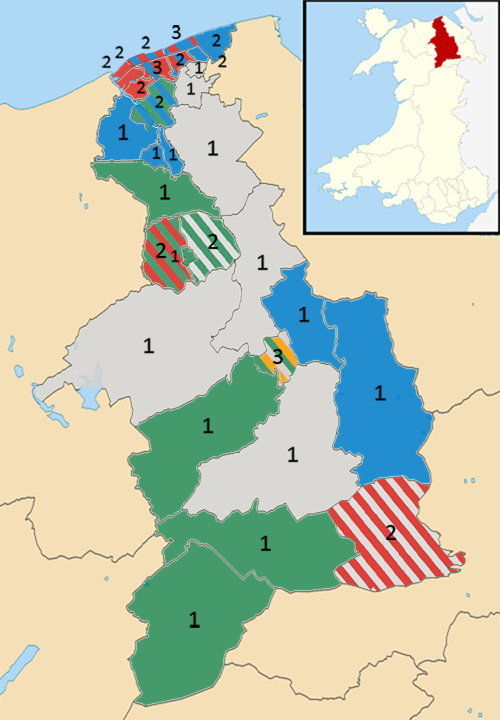
2017 election results map, showing numbers of councillors per ward and their party affiliations

The 2017 Denbighshire County Council election took place in Denbighshire, Wales, on 4 May 2017 to elect members of Denbighshire Council. This was the same day as other 2017 United Kingdom local elections. The previous elections took place in 2012 and the next all-council elections took place in 2022.

== Background ==
Though the Labour Party had ended up as the largest group, following the previous elections in 2012, they had chosen not to lead the council. The leading coalition of Conservatives, Plaid Cymru and Independents were faced with making big cost savings and there were battles over potential closure of rural schools, as well as a proposed merger between Denbighshire and Conwy county councils.

Contests took place in all except three of the 30 electoral wards.

== Results ==
=== Overview ===
The Conservatives became the largest group on the council again, after taking seats largely from the Labour Party.

Denbighshire County Council election 2017
Party	Seats	Gains	Losses	Net gain/loss	Seats %	Votes %	Votes	+/−
Conservative	16	9	1	+8	34.0	31.6	9,797	+4.4
Labour	13	1	7	-6	27.6	21.9	6,786	-7.3
Independent	8	1	5	-4	17.0	26.4	8,181	+1.0
Plaid Cymru	9	3	1	+2	19.1	12.8	3,959	+1.3
Liberal Democrats	1	0	0	0	2.1	6.3	1,964	+1.3
Green	0			0	0.0	0.8	263	-0.2
Socialist Labour	0			0	0.0	0.3	92	-0.1
UKIP	0			0	0.0	N/A	0	-0.3

== Ward results ==
* = denotes councillor elected to this ward at the 2012 elections

(a) Election Centre/Andrew Teale source also compares the percentage vote of the lead candidate for each party in the ward

(b) Denbighshire Council results per ward also give the % turnout and numbers of registered electors

=== Bodelwyddan (one seat) ===
Bodelwyddan 2017 ^{(a)}^{(b)}
Party	Candidate	Votes	%	±%
Conservative	Richard Mainon	244	40.9	+26.9
Labour	Jo Hall	150	25.1	−12.0
Independent	Raymond Beech	146	24.5	−24.4
Plaid Cymru	David Wyatt	57	9.5	+9.5
Majority		94		
Turnout			38.0	
Registered electors		1,592		
Conservative gain from Independent		Swing		

=== Corwen (one seat) ===
Corwen 2017
Party	Candidate	Votes	%	±%
Plaid Cymru	Huw Jones *	unopposed		
Registered electors		1,852		
Plaid Cymru hold		Swing		

=== Denbigh Central (one seat) ===
Denbigh Central 2017
Party	Candidate	Votes	%	±%
Plaid Cymru	Gwyneth Kensler *	378	70.3	
Independent	Paul Smith	160	29.7	
Majority		218		
Turnout			35.0	
Registered electors		1,560		
Plaid Cymru hold		Swing		

=== Denbigh Lower (two seats) ===
Denbigh Lower 2017
Party	Candidate	Votes	%	±%
Independent	Mark Young	936	47.4	
Plaid Cymru	Rhys Thomas	730	37.0	
Independent	Roy Tickle	554		
Conservative	Mari Jackson-Jones	309	15.6	
Conservative	Lara Pritchard	308		
Majority		176		
Turnout			45.0	
Registered electors		3,555		
Independent hold		Swing		
Plaid Cymru gain from Independent		Swing		

=== Denbigh Upper/Henllan (two seats) ===
Denbigh Upper/Henllan 2017
Party	Candidate	Votes	%	±%
Labour	Geraint Lloyd-Williams *	317	33.2	
Plaid Cymru	Glenn Swingler	261	27.4	
Conservative	John Bellis	244	25.6	
Labour	Gillian Audley	198		
Conservative	Paul Smith	176		
Independent	Keith Stevens	132	13.8	
Independent	Richard Crowther	87		
Independent	Colin Hughes *	87		
Majority		17		
Turnout			38.0	
Registered electors		2,349		
Labour hold		Swing		
Plaid Cymru gain from Labour		Swing		

Colin Hughes had been elected for Labour in 2012.

=== Dyserth (one seat) ===
Dyserth 2017
Party	Candidate	Votes	%	±%
Independent	David Williams	412	62.0	
Conservative	Peter Owen *	156	23.5	
Liberal Democrats	Stephen Thomas	97	14.6	
Majority		256		
Turnout			35.0	
Registered electors		1,909		
Independent gain from Conservative		Swing		

=== Efenechtyd (one seat) ===
Efenechtyd 2017
Party	Candidate	Votes	%	±%
Plaid Cymru	Eryl Williams *	407	53.2	
Independent	Sharon Newell	358	46.8	
Majority		49		
Turnout			57.0	
Registered electors		1,339		
Plaid Cymru hold		Swing		

=== Llanarmon-Yn-Lal/Llandelga (one seat) ===
Llanarmon-Yn-Lal/Llandelga 2017
Party	Candidate	Votes	%	±%
Conservative	Martyn Holland *	884	85.5	+35.3
Socialist Labour	Robert English	92	8.9	−1.8
Independent	Robert Barton	58	5.6	−5.4
Majority		792		+550
Turnout			52.0	
Registered electors		2,016		
Conservative hold		Swing		

=== Llanbedr Dyffryn Clwyd/Llangynhafal (one seat) ===
Llanbedr Dyffryn Clwyd/Llangynhafal 2017
Party	Candidate	Votes	%	±%
Conservative	Huw Williams *	unopposed		
Registered electors		1,188		
Conservative hold		Swing		

=== Llandrillo (one seat) ===
Llandrillo 2017
Party	Candidate	Votes	%	±%
Plaid Cymru	Rhodri ap Gwynfor	unopposed		
Registered electors		956		
Plaid Cymru hold		Swing		

=== Llandyrnog (one seat) ===
Llandyrnog 2017
Party	Candidate	Votes	%	±%
Independent	Thomas Parry *	655	74.3	
Liberal Democrats	William Williams	226	25.7	
Majority		429		
Turnout			51.0	
Registered electors		1,718		
Independent hold		Swing		

=== Llanfair Dyffryn Clwyd Gwyddelwern (one seat) ===
Llanfair Dyffryn Clwyd Gwyddelwern 2017
Party	Candidate	Votes	%	±%
Independent	Hugh Evans *	725	79.5	
Conservative	Barbara Hughes	187	20.5	
Turnout			51.0	
Registered electors		1,807		
Independent hold		Swing		

=== Llangollen (two seats) ===
Llangollen 2017
Party	Candidate	Votes	%	±%
Labour	Graham Timms	659	41.7	
Independent	Thomas Mile	658	41.6	
Independent	Stuart Davies *	657		
Green	Robert Spalding	263	16.6	
Majority		1		
Turnout			43.0	
Registered electors		3,317		
Labour gain from Independent		Swing		
Independent gain from Independent		Swing		

=== Llanrhaeadr-yng-Nghinmeirch (one seat) ===
Llanrhaeadr-yng-Nghinmeirch 2017
Party	Candidate	Votes	%	±%
Independent	Joseph Welch *	403	51.1	
Plaid Cymru	Cheow-Lay Wee	197	25.0	
Conservative	David Murfitt	188	23.9	
Majority		206		
Turnout			53.0	
Registered electors		1,490		
Independent hold		Swing		

=== Prestatyn Central (two seats) ===
Prestatyn Central 2017
Party	Candidate	Votes	%	±%
Conservative	Hugh Irving *	544	37.2	
Conservative	Elizabeth Jones	484		
Independent	Peter Duffy *	469	32.1	
Independent	Michael German	395		
Labour	Sonia Penlington	376	25.7	
Labour	David Lloyd	374		
Liberal Democrats	Keith Kirwan	74	5.1	
Majority		15		
Turnout			49.0	
Registered electors		2,878		
Conservative hold		Swing		
Conservative gain from Labour		Swing		

Peter Duffy was elected for the Labour Party in 2012.

=== Prestatyn East (two seats) ===
Prestatyn East 2017
Party	Candidate	Votes	%	±%
Conservative	Anthon Sampson	676	45.6	+4.0
Conservative	Julian Thompson-Hill *	621		
Labour	Caroline Holliday	486	32.8	+3.9
Liberal Democrats	Gavin Scott	320	21.6	+21.6
Majority		135		
Turnout			40.0	
Registered electors		3,205		
Conservative hold		Swing		
Conservative hold		Swing		

=== Prestatyn Meliden (one seat) ===
Prestatyn Meliden 2017
Party	Candidate	Votes	%	±%
Independent	Peter Evans *	308	53.6	+9.4
Conservative	Gerald Frobisher	221	38.4	+9.3
Liberal Democrats	Kenneth Prydderch	46	8.0	+8.0
Majority		90		
Turnout			38.0	
Registered electors		1,528		
Independent hold		Swing		

=== Prestatyn North (three seats) ===
Prestatyn North 2017
Party	Candidate	Votes	%	±%
Conservative	George Flynn	940	53.6	
Conservative	Rachel Flynn	892		
Labour	Paul Penlington *	814	46.4	
Labour	Jason McLellan *	812		
Conservative	Angelina Muraca	746		
Labour	Janet Szabo	733		
Majority		2		
Turnout			41.0	
Registered electors		4,751		
Conservative gain from Labour		Swing		
Conservative gain from Labour		Swing		
Labour hold		Swing		

=== Prestatyn South West (two seats) ===
Prestatyn South West 2017
Party	Candidate	Votes	%	±%
Conservative	Gareth Davies	505	41.1	
Labour	Robert Murray *	498	40.6	
Labour	Gareth Sandilands *	482		
Conservative	William Davies	427		
Independent	David Cooper	225	18.3	
Independent	Allan Pennington	156		
Majority		16		
Turnout			43.0	
Registered electors		2,834		
Conservative gain from Labour		Swing		
Labour hold		Swing		

=== Rhuddlan (two seats) ===
Rhuddlan 2017
Party	Candidate	Votes	%	±%
Conservative	Janet Davies *	808	48.5	+5.2
Plaid Cymru	Arwel Roberts *	577	34.6	+7.3
Conservative	Heather Ellis	385		
Labour	Jacqueline McAlpine	281	16.9	+16.9
Majority		192		
Turnout			44.0	
Registered electors		2,896		
Conservative hold		Swing		
Plaid Cymru hold		Swing		

=== Rhyl East (two seats) ===
Rhyl East 2017
Party	Candidate	Votes	%	±%
Labour	Barry Mellor *	658	47.7	0
Conservative	Tony Thomas	579	42.0	+8.8
Labour	David Simmons *	542		
Conservative	Stewart Harris	524		
Independent	Diana Hannam	143	10.4	−8.7
Majority		57		
Turnout			38.0	
Registered electors		3,716		
Labour hold		Swing		
Conservative gain from Labour		Swing		

=== Rhyl South (two seats) ===
Rhyl South 2017
Party	Candidate	Votes	%	±%
Labour	Jeanette Chamberlain-Jones *	684	54.1	
Labour	Ellie Chard	601		
Conservative	Justine Evans	580	45.9	
Conservative	Daniel Murray	570		
Majority		21		
Turnout			47.0	
Registered electors		2,941		
Labour hold		Swing		
Labour hold		Swing		

=== Rhyl South East (three seats) ===
Rhyl South East 2017
Party	Candidate	Votes	%	±%
Labour	Brian Blakeley *	1,160	47.8	
Labour	Cheryl Williams	743		
Conservative	Brian Jones	722	29.8	
Labour	Stephen Ellison	715		
Conservative	Ellie Jones	650		
Conservative	Curtis Shea	578		
Independent	Winifred Mullen-James *	438	18.1	
Independent	William Tasker *	264		
Independent	Hugh Jones	250		
Liberal Democrats	David Dear	105	4.3	
Majority		7		
Turnout			36.0	
Registered electors		6,092		
Labour hold		Swing		
Labour hold		Swing		
Conservative gain from Labour		Swing		

Win Mullen-James and Bill Tasker had been sitting Labour councillors, but Mullen-James was deselected by her party prior to the election.

=== Rhyl South West (two seats) ===
Rhyl South West 2017
Party	Candidate	Votes	%	±%
Labour	Patricia Jones *	703	65.7	
Labour	Peter Prendergast	559		
Conservative	Dawn Butters	367	34.3	
Majority		192		
Turnout			28.0	
Registered electors		3,763		
Labour hold		Swing		
Labour hold		Swing		

=== Rhyl West (two seats) ===
Rhyl West 2017
Party	Candidate	Votes	%	±%
Labour	Joan Butterfield *	unopposed		
Labour	Alan James	unopposed		
Registered electors		3,473		
Labour hold		Swing		
Labour hold		Swing		

=== Ruthin (three seats) ===
Ruthin 2017
Party	Candidate	Votes	%	±%
Independent	Huw Hilditch-Roberts *	1,237	33.7	
Plaid Cymru	Emrys Wynne	1,089	29.6	
Liberal Democrats	Robina Feeley *	832	22.6	
Plaid Cymru	Hywel Richards	783		
Independent	Patricia Astbury	655		
Conservative	John Hughes	516	14.0	
Independent	Geraint Woolford	397		
Independent	Ian Lewney	247		
Conservative	Aileen Wynn	190		
Majority		49		
Turnout			54.0	
Registered electors		4,327		
Independent hold		Swing		
Plaid Cymru gain from Independent		Swing		
Liberal Democrats hold		Swing		

=== St Asaph East (one seat) ===
St Asaph East 2017
Party	Candidate	Votes	%	±%
Conservative	David Thomas	391	60.3	
Liberal Democrats	Heather Prydderch	173	30.7	
Majority		92		
Turnout			39.0	
Registered electors		1,445		
Conservative hold		Swing		

=== St Asaph West (one seat) ===
St Asaph West 2017
Party	Candidate	Votes	%	±%
Conservative	Peter Scott	201	47.6	
Independent	John Wynne-Jones	171	40.5	
Independent	Peter Morton	50	11.8	
Majority		30		
Turnout			33.0	
Registered electors		1,288		
Independent hold		Swing		

=== Trefnant (one seat) ===
Trefnant 2017
Party	Candidate	Votes	%	±%
Plaid Cymru	Meirick Davies *	263	36.3	
Conservative	Terence Mendies	242	33.4	
Independent	Dennis Williams	219	30.2	
Majority		21		
Turnout			47.0	
Registered electors		1,545		
Plaid Cymru hold		Swing		

=== Tremeirchion (one seat) ===
Tremeirchion 2017
Party	Candidate	Votes	%	±%
Conservative	Christine Marston	293	44.3	−1.5
Independent	Barbara Smith *	184	27.8	−26.6
Independent	Peter Scott	94	14.2	
Liberal Democrats	Penelope Mawdsley	91	13.7	+13.7
Majority		109		
Turnout			50.0	
Registered electors		1,338		
Conservative gain from Independent		Swing		

== By-elections 2017 to 2021 ==
=== Corwen ===
Corwen by-election: 18 March 2021
Party	Candidate	Votes	%	±%
Plaid Cymru	Alan Hughes	480	65.6	N/A
Labour	Gordon Hughes	148	20.2	N/A
Liberal Democrats	Lisa Davies	104	14.2	N/A
Majority		332		
Plaid Cymru hold		Swing		

The by-election was called after the death of Plaid Cymru councillor, Huw "Chick" Jones. He had died in early 2020 but the by-election was delayed considerably because of the Covid-19 pandemic.

=== Llandrillo ===
Llandrillo: 11 November 2021
Party	Candidate	Votes	%	±%
Plaid Cymru	Gwyneth Ellis	179	44.0	N/A
Independent	David Robinson	140	34.4	N/A
Conservative	Julian Sampson	88	21.6	N/A
Majority		39	9.6	
Turnout		407		
Plaid Cymru hold		Swing		
