= William Roberts (bishop of Bangor) =

Welsh bishop of Bangor

William Roberts (1585–1665) was a Welsh bishop of Bangor. A royalist, he suffered deprivation of his benefices after the First English Civil War.

== Life ==
According to local tradition he was born at Plas Bennett, in the parish of Llandyrnog, Denbighshire, and belonged to the Roberts family that long resided there. He was educated at Queens' College, Cambridge, of which he became a fellow, and in 1619 he held the office of proctor of the university. In 1629 he was appointed to the sub-deanery of Wells, which he resigned on his promotion, through the interest of William Laud, to the see of Bangor. His consecration took place in September 1637. He held, in commendam with his bishopric, the rectory of Llandyrnog and the sinecure rectory of Llanrhaiadr in Cimmerch (both of which continued to be so held by his successors until 1859), together with the archdeaconries of Bangor and Anglesea (which were held by occupants of the see between 1574 and 1685).

He was deprived of his See by Parliament on 9 October 1646, as episcopacy was abolished for the duration of the Commonwealth and the Protectorate. He is said to have suffered much for his adherence to the king during the civil war. In 1649 his temporal estates were sequestrated, and the manor of Gogarth was sold on 18 July 1650. He is mentioned in a list of those whose estates were declared forfeited for treason by an act of 18 October 1652; but all his property was restored to him in 1660. In the following year he recommenced services in the cathedral and settled the orders of preaching.

He died on 12 August 1665 at the rectory, Llandyrnog, near Denbigh, and was buried in the chancel of that church. By his will he made bequests to Bangor Cathedral, Queens' College, Cambridge, Jesus College, Oxford, and the poor of Westminster and St. Giles's, London, which were visited by the bubonic plague.
