= Prestatyn North =

Electoral ward of Prestatyn, Wales

Coordinates: 53.335°N 3.427°W

- Location within Denbighshire
- Population: 5,716 (2011 Census)
- OS grid reference: SJ065825
- Community: Prestatyn
- Principal area: Denbighshire
- Preserved county: Clwyd
- Country: Wales
- Sovereign state: United Kingdom
- Post town: PRESTATYN
- Postcode district: LL19
- Dialling code: 01745
- UK Parliament: Clwyd East
- Senedd Cymru – Welsh Parliament: Vale of Clwyd
- Councillors: 3 (County); 5 (Town Council)

Prestatyn North is the name of one of the electoral wards of the town of Prestatyn, Denbighshire, Wales. It covers the northwest part of the town, either side of Victoria Road close to the beach. Prestatyn East ward lies to the east, while Rhyl East lies to the west.

According to the 2011 UK Census the population of the ward was 5,716 (with 4,624 of voting age).

	(Liverpool Bay)
Rhyl East	Prestatyn North	Prestatyn East
Rhyl South East	Prestatyn South West / Prestatyn Central

== County council elections ==
The ward elects three county councillors to Denbighshire County Council. At the May 2017 election, the seats were won by two Welsh Conservative candidates and one from Welsh Labour, with wins for one Conservative and two Labour candidates in May 2022. In the past the ward has changed hands between Labour (who held the ward between 2012 and 2017), Conservatives and Independent councillors.

Prestatyn North became newsworthy in May 2012 when two candidates with similar names, Labour candidate Paul Penlington and Conservative Allan Pennington, were mixed up by the returning officer. A block of Penlington's votes were allocated to Pennington in error, with the latter being declared winner of the third council seat. Losing independent councillor, Mike German, demanded the election be re-run. After a costly legal dispute in the High Court, Penlington took his rightful seat, on 14 February 2013. All three seats were then held by the Welsh Labour Party.

== Prestatyn Town Council ==
For elections to Prestatyn Town Council the town is divided into six wards, with Prestatyn North county ward being subdivided into North and North West. Five of the eighteen town councillors are elected from the North and North West wards.

== See also ==
- List of places in Denbighshire (categorised)
