= Llanrhaeadr =

Llanrhaeadr (historically also the anglicised spelling Llanrhaiadr) could be:

- Llanrhaeadr-ym-Mochnant, a village in Powys, Wales (historically in Denbighshire until 1974)
- Llanrhaeadr-yng-Nghinmeirch, a village in Denbighshire, Wales
