= Dibleys Nurseries =

Plant grower in Wales

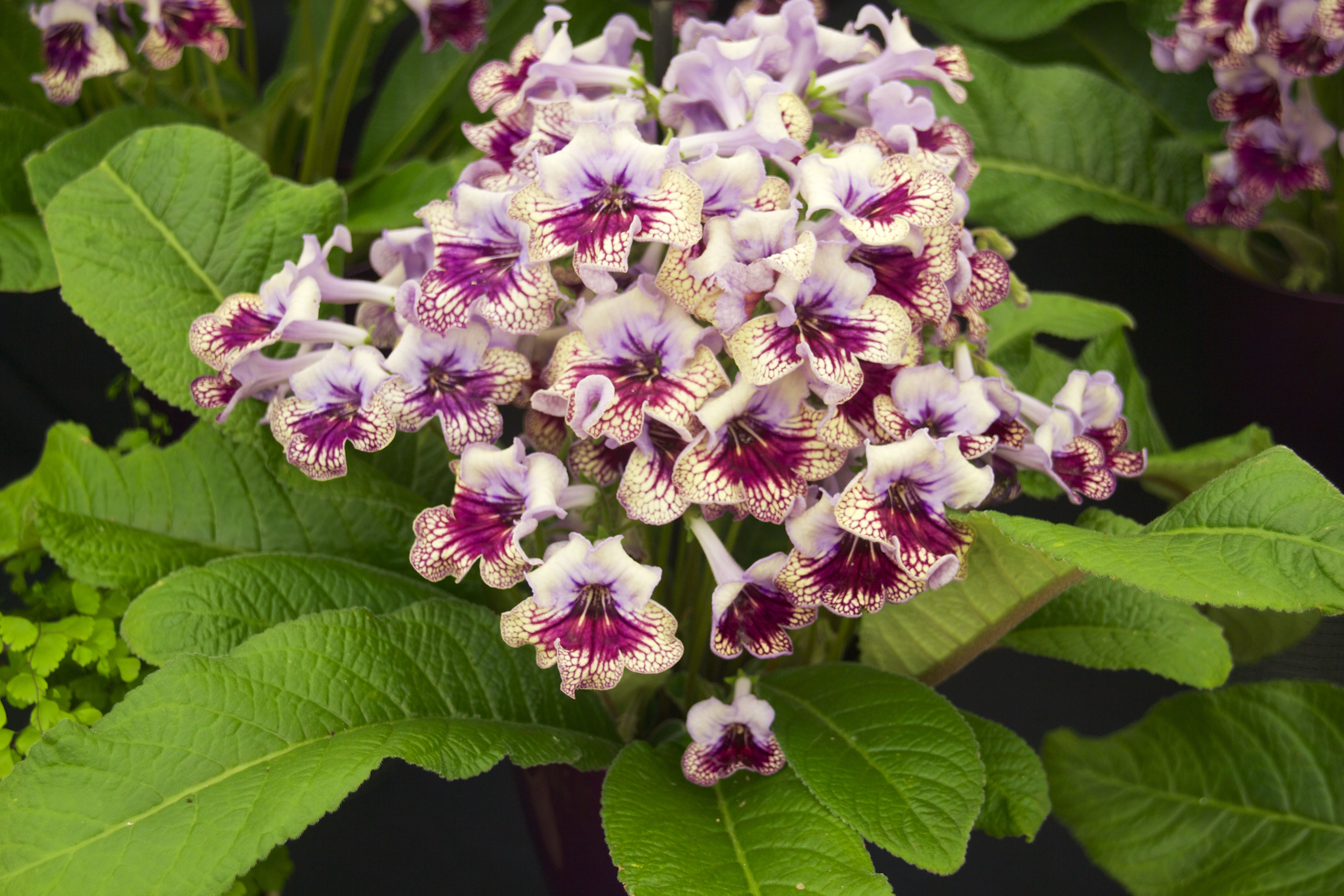
Streptocarpus 'Harlequin Lace', a Dibleys hybrid

Dibleys Nurseries is a grower of Streptocarpus plants. The nursery is based in Llanelidan, Denbighshire, north-east Wales.

In 2021, Dibleys Nurseries won their 31st Gold Medal at the RHS Chelsea Flower Show, bringing their tally of RHS Gold medals to a total of over 200.

Dibleys' Streptocarpus 'Harlequin Blue' was named RHS Plant of the Year at the 2010 Chelsea Flower Show.

== History ==
Rex Dibley started the nursery in 1976 and originally called it 'Efenechtyd Nurseries', taking the name of the nearby village of Efenechtyd at the time. The Welsh name proved difficult for some, so the nursery's name was changed to 'Dibleys Nurseries' after the family name. In 1984, Rex Dibley's son, Gareth Dibley, joined the business, having recently graduated with a degree in horticulture from Reading University.

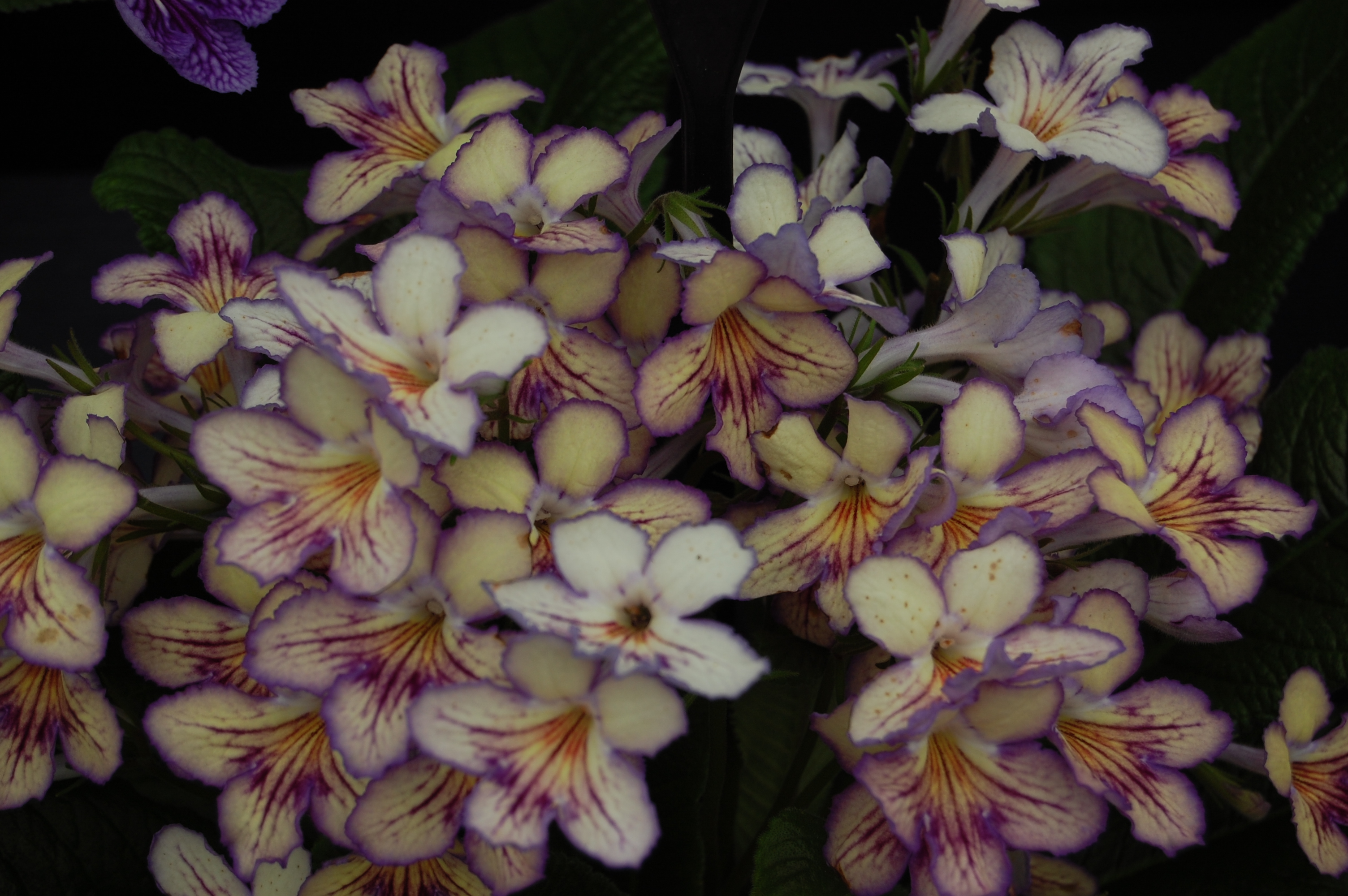
Streptocarpus 'Seren', a Dibleys hybrid, displayed at a RHS flower show
