= Pwllglas =

Village in Denbighshire, Wales

Coordinates: 53.083°N 3.316°W

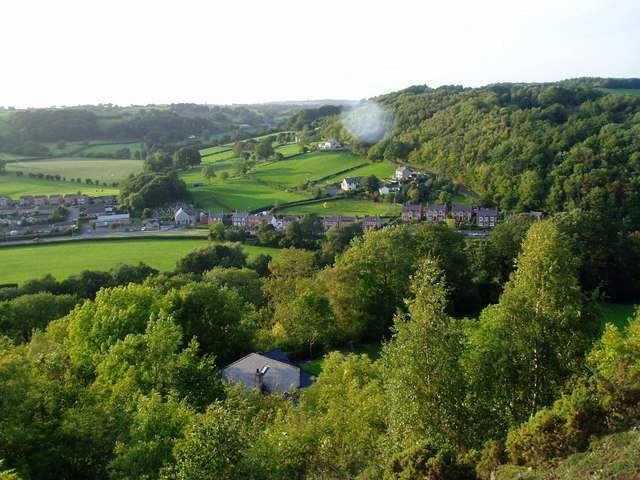
- Pwllglas

- Location within Denbighshire
- Population: 238
- OS grid reference: SJ117546
  - Cardiff: 159 mi (256 km)
  - London: 172 mi (277 km)
- Community: Efenechtyd
- Principal area: Denbighshire
- Country: Wales
- Sovereign state: United Kingdom
- Post town: RUTHIN
- Postcode district: LL15
- Dialling code: 01824
- Police: North Wales
- Fire: North Wales
- Ambulance: Welsh
- UK Parliament: Bangor Aberconwy
- Senedd Cymru – Welsh Parliament: Clwyd West

Pwllglas (or Pwll-glâs) is a village in Denbighshire, Wales, near the town of Ruthin, and in the community of Efenechtyd.

Pwllglas is on the A494, which runs through the middle of the village, and contains three cul-de-sacs: Erw Las, Dyffryn and Tan y Bryn. The nearby village of Bryn Saith Marchog is four miles away.

Pwllglas has a thriving local community centred on the village hall, and 2013 saw the reinstatement of a village shop in the hall, which won the "Village shop / Post office" category in the Countryside Alliance awards in February 2016. There is also a public house in the village, named The Fox and Hounds, and the nine-hole Ruthin-Pwllglas Golf Club lies just outside the village towards Ruthin.
