= Leah Owen =

Welsh singer, conductor and teacher (1953–2024)

- Born: 13 October 1953; Bangor, Gwynedd, Wales
- Died: 4 January 2024 (aged 70); Denbigh, Denbighshire, Wales
- Occupation: singer

Leah Owen (13 October 1953 – 4 January 2024) was a Welsh singer, conductor and music coach who came to prominence when she won four first prizes at the Ammanford Eisteddfod in 1970. She won the Sir T.H. Parry-Williams Medal in 2010.

She was born in Bangor and grew up in Rhosmeirch on Anglesey. She went to Bangor University graduating with a Bachelor of Music in 1974. After that she taught at Ysgol Hirael, Bangor, Ysgol Uwchradd Denbigh, Ysgol Twm o'r Nant, Denbigh, and Denbighshire Cooperative Music and Sir Language Center Denbigh.

As a teacher she taught hundreds of children. Those she taught included singers Steffan Rhys Hughes and Mared Williams. She also taught actress and television personality Amber Davies.

Owen recorded several solo albums herself for Recordiau Sain between 1975 and 2001. She served as a guest vocal soloist and conductor for various choirs. She also presented her own show on BBC Radio Cymru.

She received an honorary Doctor of Music degree from Bangor University in December 2023. At the ceremony she gave a speech, talking about her enjoyment of training hundreds of children and young people.

== Personal life ==
She lived in the Prion area of Denbigh, with her husband Eifion Lloyd Jones. They had four children together - Angharad, Elysteg, Ynyr and Rhys. Owen was a Welsh language speaker.

Leah Owen died at her home in Y Gelli, aged 70, after a period of illness. A funeral was held by her immediate family on 18 January 2024, before a public service of thanks in Y Capel Mawr, Denbigh.
