= Plas Bennett =

Building in Denbighshire, Wales

- Location within Wales

General information
- Status: Completed
- Location: Llandyrnog, Denbighshire, Wales
- Coordinates: 53.173375°N 3.345367°W

Website
- Cadw

References
- Cadw 758

Plas Bennett is a Grade II listed building in the community of Llandyrnog, Denbighshire, Wales, which dates back to the 18th century. It was listed by Cadw (Reference Number 758). Plas Bennett is an early 18th century house, with a reported datestone of 1710. It is a 2-storey 5-window house with a slate roof. The sides and the rear of the house are rendered, with a dormer window at the back of the house. There is a reconstructed parapet, which partly conceals the roof at the front.

== Location ==
This building is south-west of the village of Llandyrnog, with former farm buildings to the rear.
