= Prion, Denbighshire =

Village in Denbighshire, Wales

Coordinates: 53.149834°N 3.4175°W

Prion
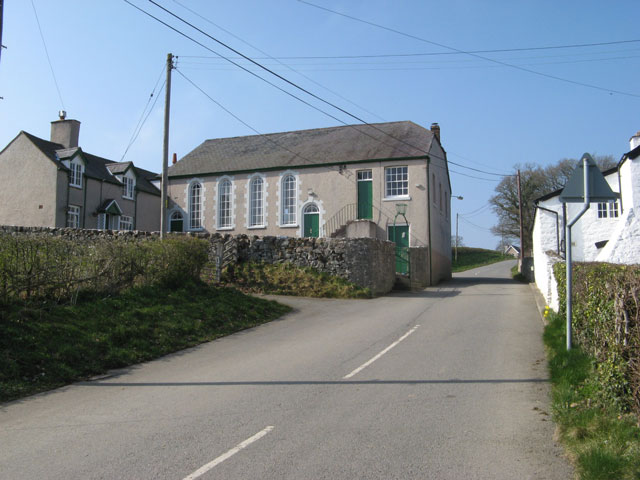
- Chapel and house in 2009

- Location within Denbighshire
- OS grid reference: SJ053663
- Community: Denbigh
- Principal area: Denbighshire
- Preserved county: Clwyd
- Country: Wales
- Sovereign state: United Kingdom
- Post town: DENBIGH
- Postcode district: LL16
- Dialling code: 01745
- Police: North Wales
- Fire: North Wales
- Ambulance: Welsh
- UK Parliament: Clwyd North
- Senedd Cymru – Welsh Parliament: Vale of Clwyd
- Website: denbightowncouncil.gov.uk

Prion is a village in the Vale of Clwyd, and is located in the community of Llanrhaeadr-yng-Nghinmeirch in Denbighshire, Wales, about two miles south of the town of Denbigh and on the northern border of the Denbigh Moors. There is no centre for the village, just a collection of scattered houses and farms. Ysgol Pantpastynog primary school, Capel Prion (Presbyterian) and Saint James' Church (closed in 2008) are in the village.

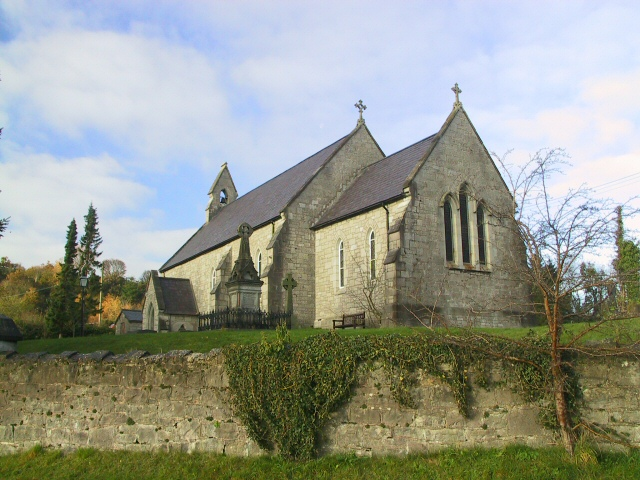
Prion Church.

== The origin of the name ==
According to the Dictionary of the Place-Names of Wales , the name means 'tir Pereu'.

== Notable people ==
- Edward Jones, hymnist
- Leah Owen, singer
