= Hugh Evans (politician) =

Welsh politician and farmer

Hugh Evans OBE

Leader of Denbighshire County Council
- In office 2007–2022

Personal details
- Born: 1961 (age 64–65)
- Party: Independent

Hugh Evans OBE (born c. 1961) is a farmer and county councillor in Denbighshire, Wales, who was leader of Denbighshire County Council between 2007 and 2022.

== Background ==
Evans is a dairy farmer from Llanelidan, Denbighshire. He was first elected to Denbighshire County Council as an independent councillor for the ward of Llanfair Dyffryn Clwyd/Gwyddelwern in 2004. He became leader of the council in November 2007 after the previous leader, Rhiannon Hughes, had resigned in October following damning reports into the county's education services. Evans was the only person nominated and was backed by all five political groups on the council. He immediately took on the role of the council's education leader himself and announced he'd be reducing the size of the council's cabinet.

He was re-elected as leader following the May 2008 local elections. A Conservative councillor stood against him.

Evans was awarded an OBE in the 2012 New Years Honours, for services to local government.

Evans was re-elected as leader following the May 2017 elections, taking on the Economy, Planning and Regulation portfolio.

Evans is Welsh Local Government Association (WLGA) Independent Group Leader.
