= Rhyl West =

Electoral ward in Denbighshire, Wales

Coordinates: 53.318°N 3.494°W

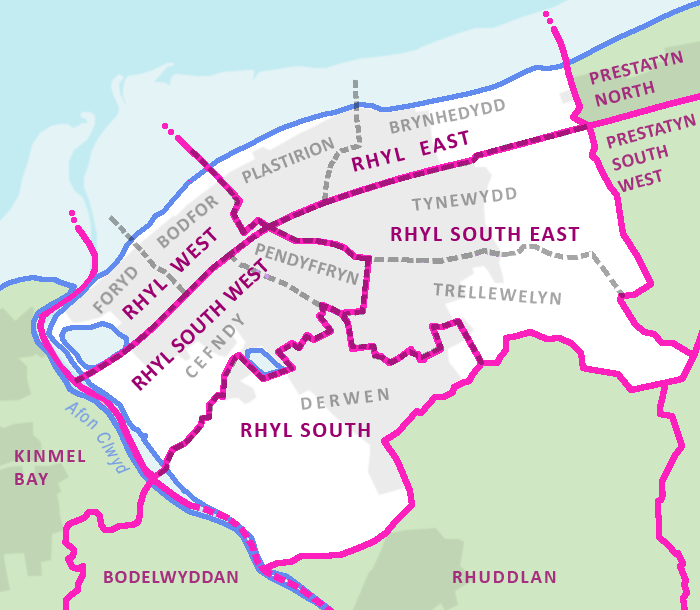
- Electoral wards in and surrounding Rhyl

- Location within Denbighshire
- Population: 4,386 (2011)
- OS grid reference: SJ015815
- Community: Rhyl
- Principal area: Denbighshire
- Preserved county: Clwyd
- Country: Wales
- Sovereign state: United Kingdom
- Post town: RHYL
- Postcode district: LL18
- Dialling code: 01745
- UK Parliament: Clwyd North
- Senedd Cymru – Welsh Parliament: Vale of Clwyd
- Councillors: 2 (County); 4 (Town Council)

Rhyl West is the name of one of the electoral wards of the town of Rhyl, Denbighshire, Wales. It covers the northwest part of the town, including the town centre at one end and as far as Marine Lake and the Marina Quay on the western edge. Rhyl East ward lies to the east, Rhyl South West to the south and Conwy County Borough's Kinmel Bay ward to the west.

== Description ==
Rhyl West includes Rhyl town centre and the area of the town to the southwest. According to the 2011 UK Census the population of the ward was 4,386 (with 3,369 of voting age).

In 2008 Rhyl West was measured as the most deprived ward in Wales, according to the Welsh Index of Multiple Deprivation. According to a 2002 article in The Guardian, "many guest houses on the west side of town where the posh people once lived have been converted into cheap bedsits, homes for locals and incomers united by poverty and sometimes drugs". In 2008 the town was earmarked for help with regeneration, from the Welsh Government. In October Rhyl West councillors Ian Armstrong and Joan Butterfield joined local MP, Chris Ruane, to paint out a notorious derelict shop sign which read "Rhyl's Biggest Receiver Of Stolen Goods". Men in the ward had the second lowest life expectancy at birth, 68.3 years, of any ward in England and Wales in 2016.

== County council elections ==
The ward elects two county councillors to Denbighshire County Council and at the May 2017 and May 2022 elections both seats were won by Welsh Labour. The ward has consistently elected Labour councillors since 1995.

== Rhyl Town Council ==
For elections to Rhyl Town Council the town is divided into nine community wards, with Rhyl West county ward being subdivided into two community wards, Foryd and Bodfor. Four of the twenty two town councillors are elected from the Foryd and Bodfor wards.

== See also ==
- List of places in Denbighshire (categorised)
