= Clocaenog =

Village in Denbighshire, Wales

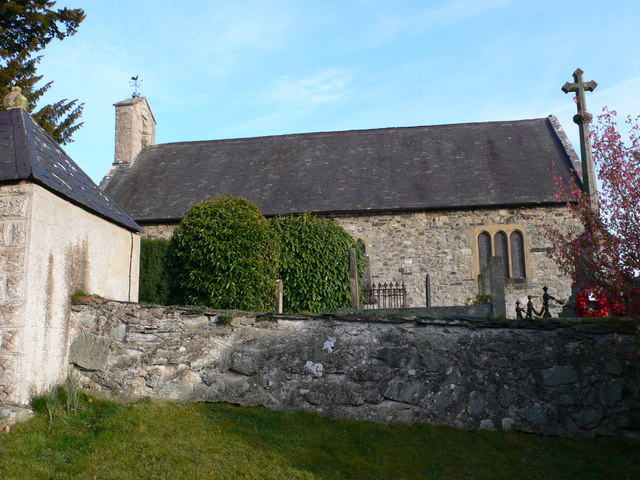
- Clocaenog Church

- Location within Denbighshire
- Population: 254 (2011)
- OS grid reference: SJ082542
  - Cardiff: 110.6 mi (178.0 km)
  - London: 174.7 mi (281.2 km)
- Community: Clocaenog
- Principal area: Denbighshire
- Country: Wales
- Sovereign state: United Kingdom
- Post town: RUTHIN
- Postcode district: LL15
- Dialling code: 01824
- Police: North Wales
- Fire: North Wales
- Ambulance: Welsh
- UK Parliament: Bangor Aberconwy
- Senedd Cymru – Welsh Parliament: Clwyd West
- List of places UK Wales Denbighshire 53.075°N 3.370°W Map of the community

Clocaenog is a village and community in Denbighshire, north-east Wales. It lies on the outskirts of Ruthin and the Clocaenog Forest. The forest near the village has many walks of varying length and is one of the venues for the Wales Rally GB.

== Church of St Foddhyd (Meddvyth) ==
This neat and well-kept church stands on a hill – ‘Clocaenog’ means ‘mossy knoll’ – above the village. Dedicated to St Foddhyd (Meddvyth), ancient records show that its patron was ‘St Meddvyth the Virgin’, daughter of St. Idloes of Llanidloes in Powys. The restored interior is dominated by a fine ‘rood screen’ (see Derwen), its top rail intricately carved with trailing foliage and its lower panels with ‘candle-flame’ motifs. These date to about 1538, the date once inscribed in the big east window above the altar. The window now displays fragments of its original stained glass, including heads of men and angels and (in the topmost left-hand light) the nail-pierced feet of a crucified Christ. The roof is also late medieval, as may be the massive dug-out chest hewn from a single tree trunk. Later treasures include the pulpit of 1695 and an elaborate wooden chandelier with beast-head decoration, dated 1725.

Church open by arrangement. Please see Church notice board. Further information and opening times from Diocesan Office, High Street, St Asaph, LL17 0RD Phone number: 01745 582245

== Listed buildings nearby ==
Grade II*

- Maes Caenog: Farm Building at Plas Clocaenog

Grade II

- Hen Blas, Plas Clocaenog Farmhouse with attached outbuildings, Sundial in Churchyard, Triple Stable at Plas Clocaenog, Ty Isa, Maes, Tyn-y-mynydd, Kitchen Garden at Pool Park including Former Gardeners' Bothy and War Memorial in St Foddhyd's Churchyard.

== Demographics ==
Clocaenog's population was 254, according to the 2011 census; a 9.48% increase since the 232 people noted in 2001.

The 2011 census showed 54.4% of the population could speak Welsh, a rise from 47.6% in 2001.
