= Efenechtyd =

Hamlet in Denbighshire, Wales

Efenechtyd: Welsh: Efenechdyd
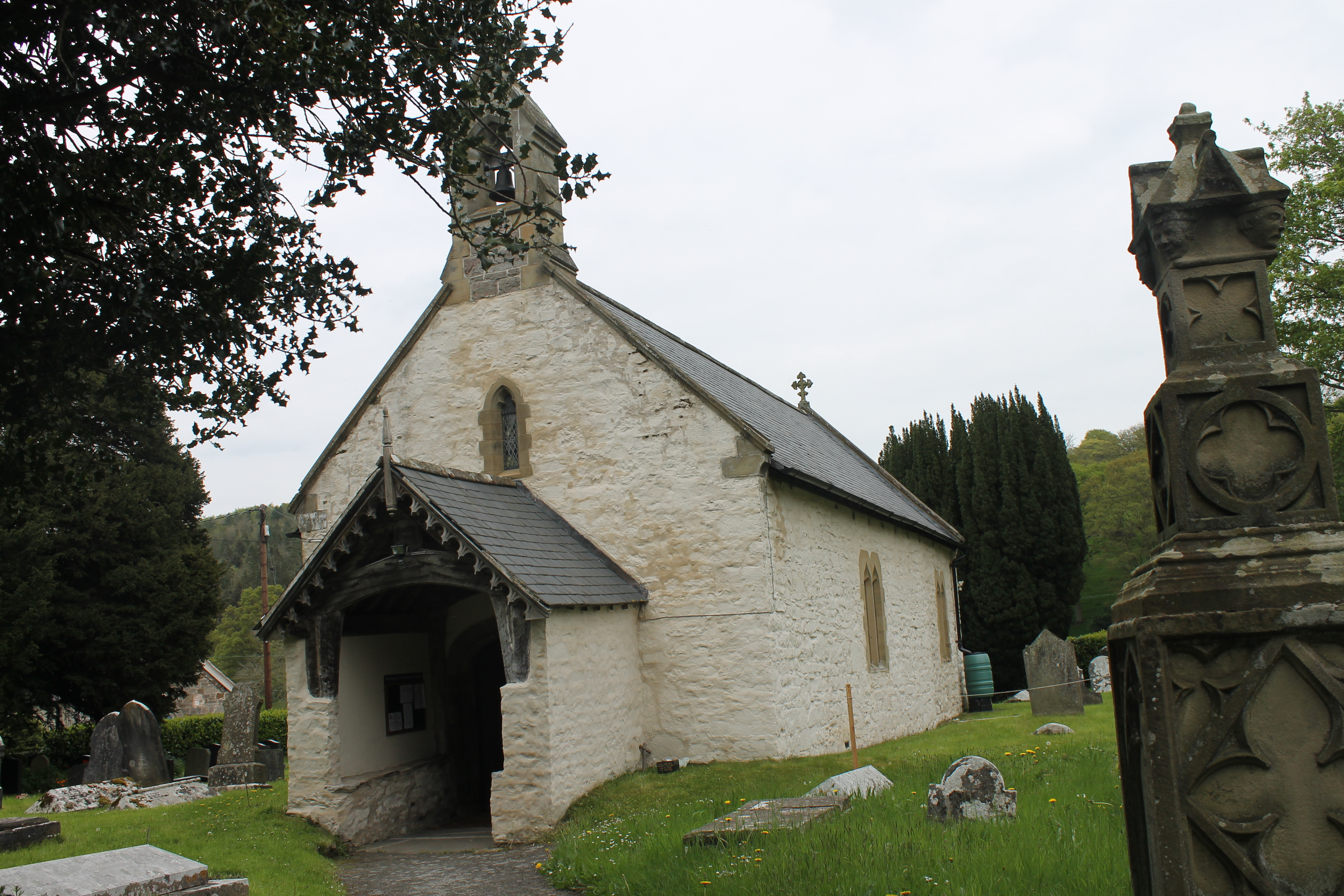
- St Michael and All Angels

- Location within Denbighshire
- Population: 655 (2011)
- OS grid reference: SJ115555
- Community: Efenechtyd
- Principal area: Denbighshire
- Country: Wales
- Sovereign state: United Kingdom
- Post town: RUTHIN
- Postcode district: LL15
- Dialling code: 01824
- Police: North Wales
- Fire: North Wales
- Ambulance: Welsh
- UK Parliament: Clwyd West
- Senedd Cymru – Welsh Parliament: Clwyd West
- List of places UK Wales Denbighshire 53.091°N 3.328°W Map of the community

Efenechtyd (Welsh: Efenechdyd) is a hamlet and community in a deep valley in Denbighshire, Wales which contains the Church of St Michael and All Angels. The community includes the village of Pwllglas. Efenechtyd is also the name of an electoral division.

== Governance ==
The Efenechtyd electoral division elects a county councillor to Denbighshire County Council. This ward stretches to the south-west of Efenechtyd with a total population taken at the 2011 census of 1,686, the community population being 655.

== Church of St Michael and All Angels ==
St Michael's is the tiny church of Efenechtyd. At twenty feet wide, St Michael's is the second smallest church in the Church in Wales diocese of St Asaph.

The circular churchyard suggests Celtic origins. The church may have been founded by monks from St Saeran's at Llanynys and probably dates from the 13th century. The east window probably dates from c. 1400.

The church's most notable feature is its rare medieval wooden font, probably of 15th- or 16th-century origin, similar to the stone fonts fashionable at that time. It is made from a single circular oak block with fourteen facets over a ring of beading. Similarly the battlemented rail near the altar is also late medieval and part of a rood screen. Another notable feature includes a fragment of a Welsh wall-painted Ten Commandments, probably Elizabethan or Jacobean. Monuments include a painted timber memorial to Catherine Lloyd (1810) and a Georgian monument to Joseph Conway of Plas-yn-Llan, near the churchyard gate.

The church was extensively restored in 1873.

The rounded stone by the font is the ‘Maen Camp’, formerly used at the local ‘campau’ (‘Sports’) on St. Michael's Day, 29 September. Village Samsons strove to hurl it backwards over their heads. The custom of throwing the Feat Stone has been revived in recent years and takes place at the Harvest Festival celebrations.

Church of St Michael and All Angels

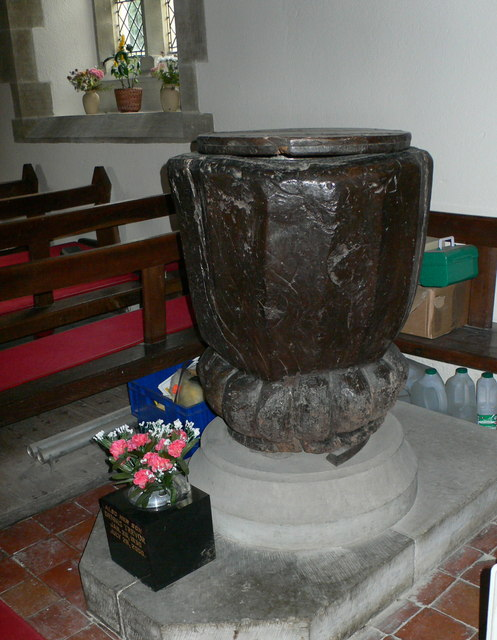
Font, carved from one piece of wood

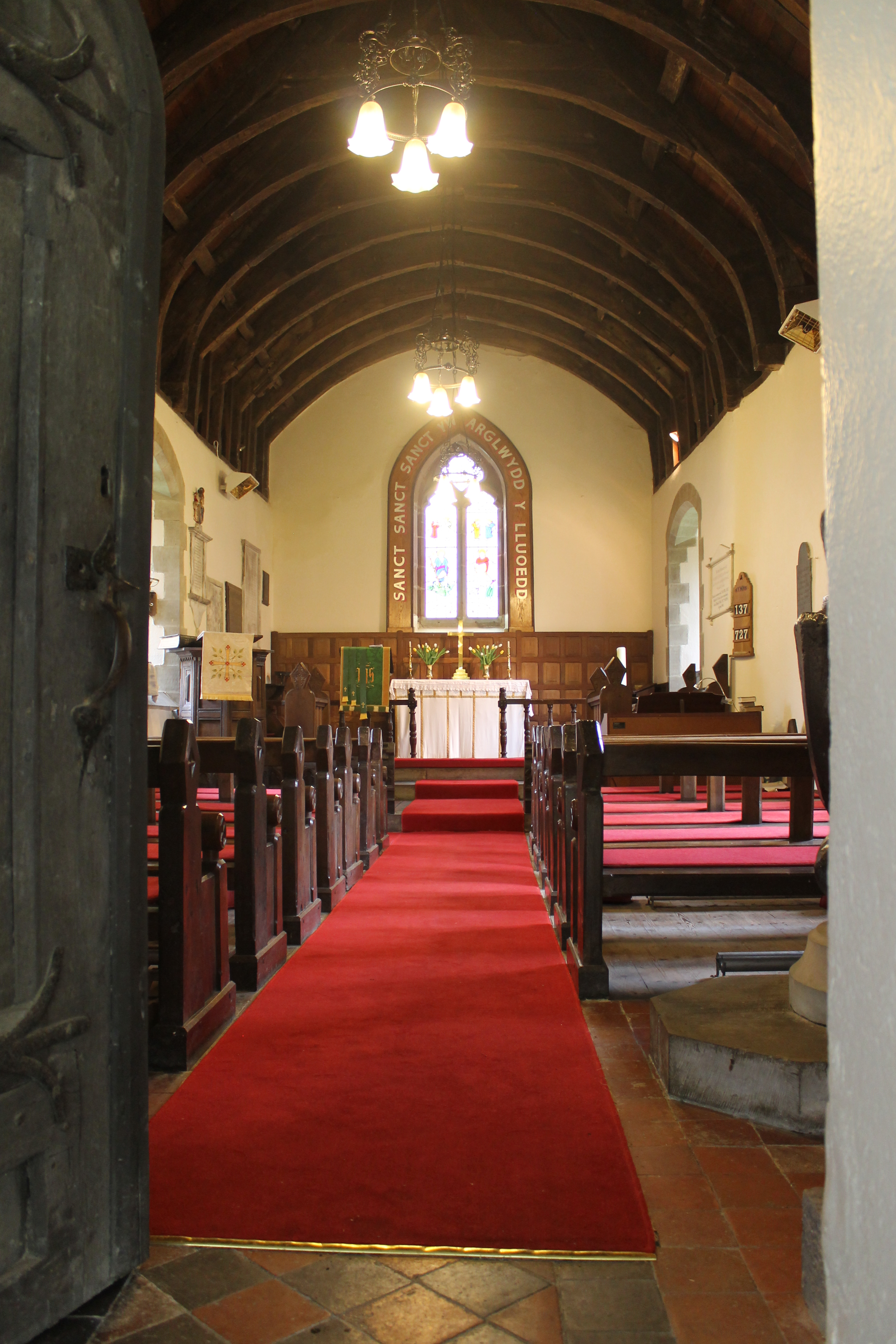
Interior, looking towards the altar

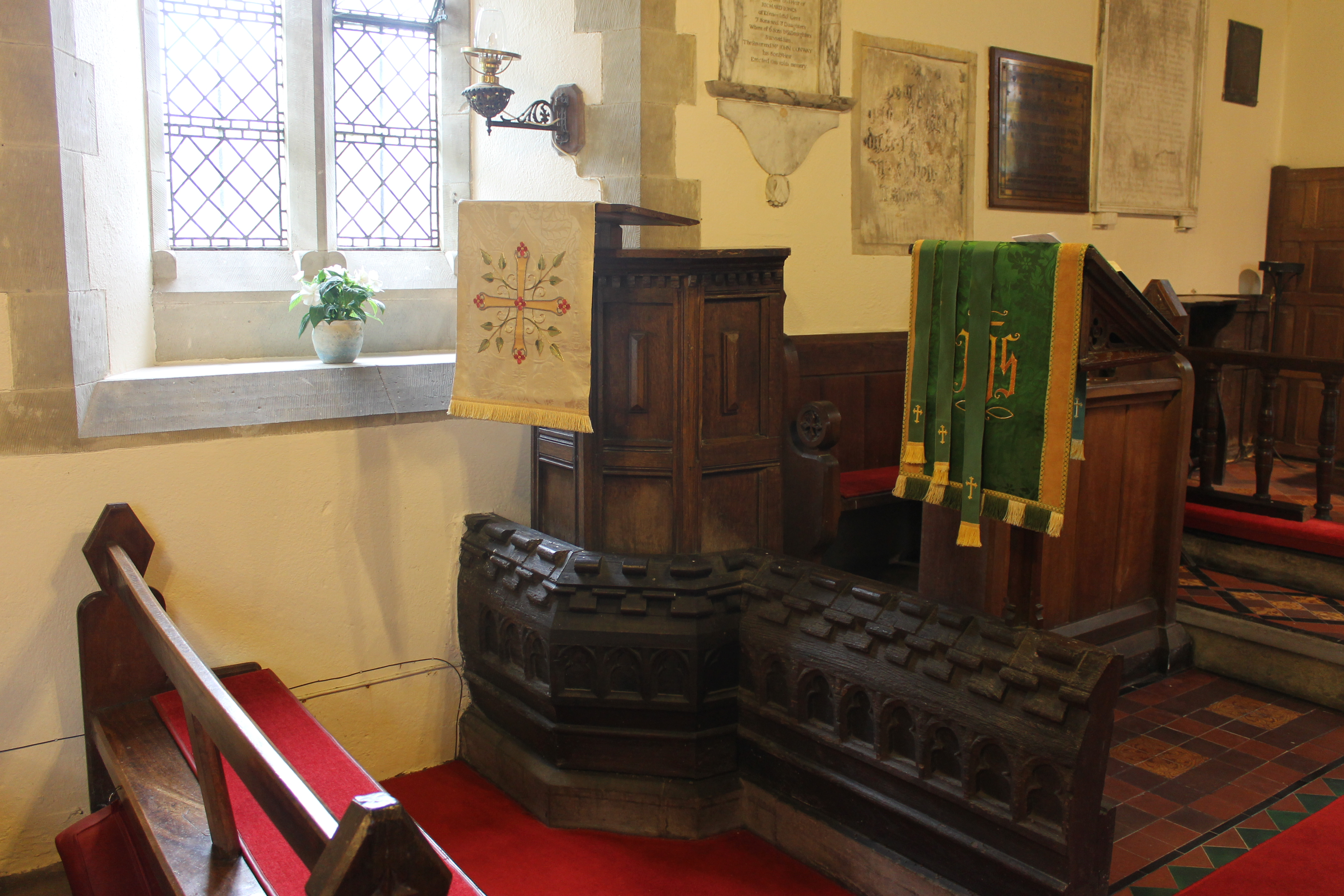
Carved rood and pulpit

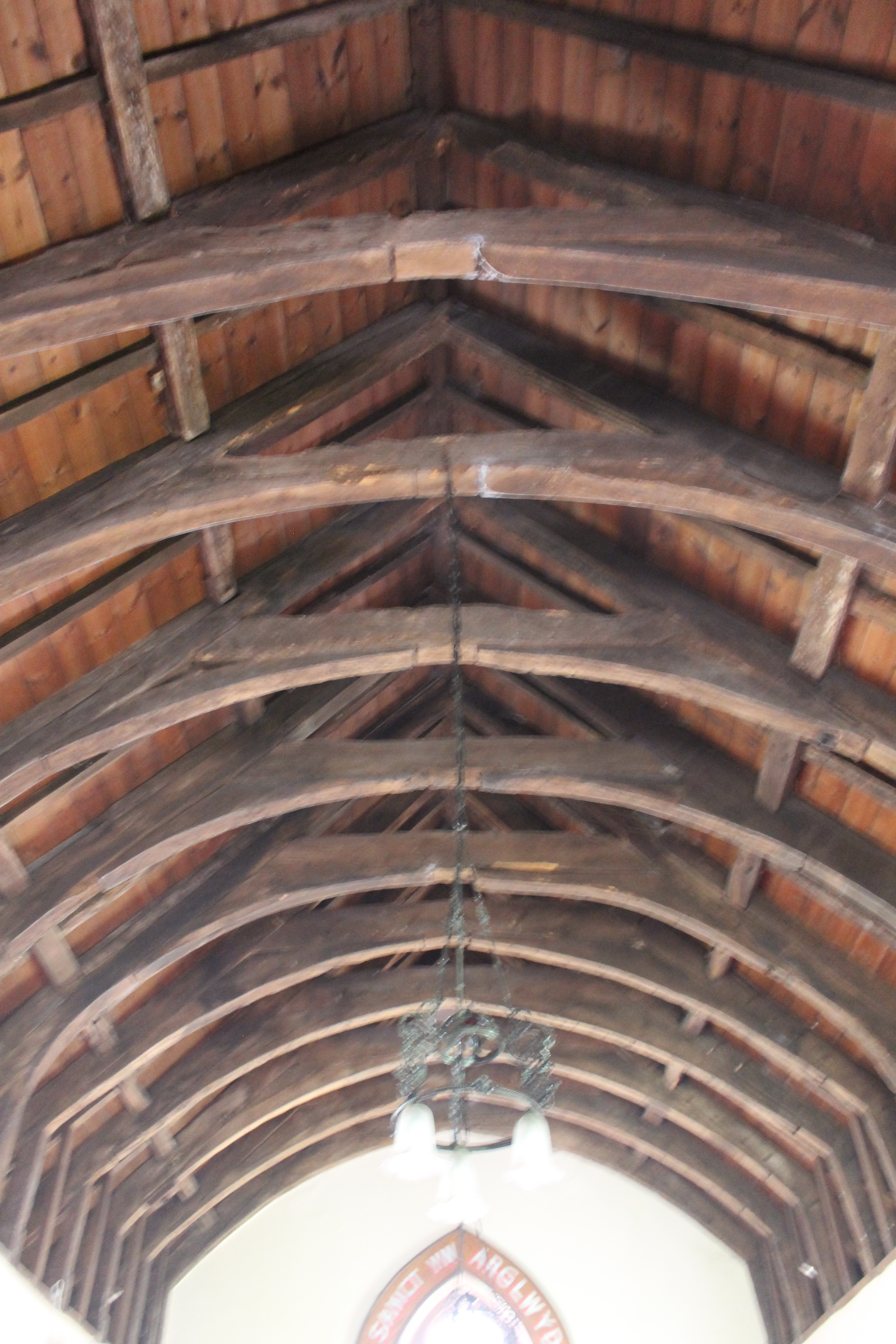
Roof beams

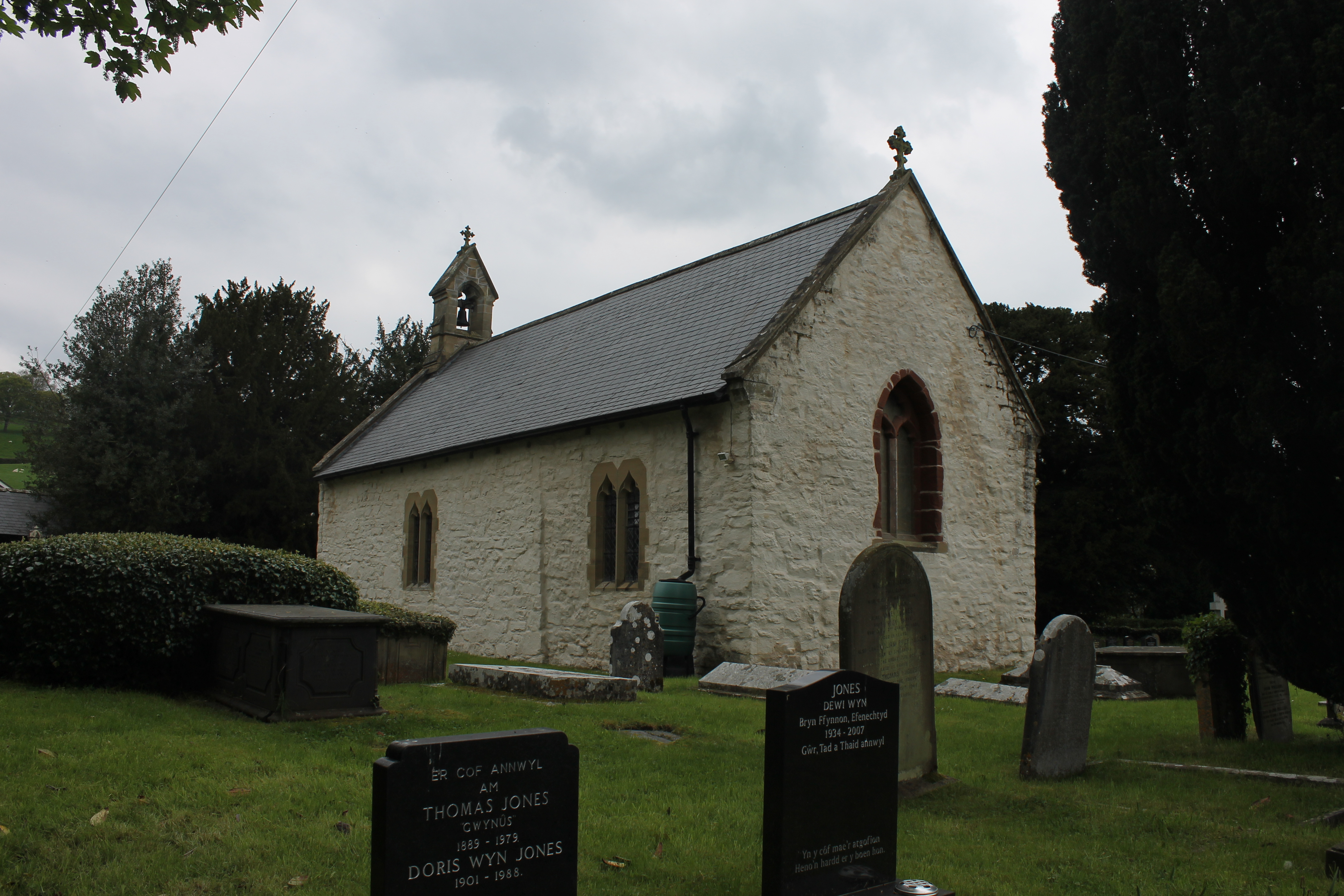
Back of church
