= Llandyrnog =

Village in Denbighshire, Wales

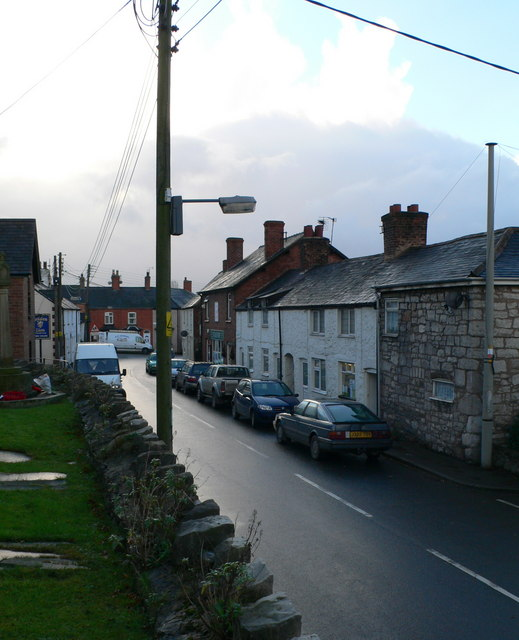
- Llandyrnog village

- Location within Denbighshire
- Population: 1,096 (2011)
- OS grid reference: SJ107650
- Community: Llandyrnog
- Principal area: Denbighshire
- Preserved county: Clwyd
- Country: Wales
- Sovereign state: United Kingdom
- Post town: DENBIGH
- Postcode district: LL16
- Dialling code: 01824
- Police: North Wales
- Fire: North Wales
- Ambulance: Welsh
- UK Parliament: Clwyd East
- Senedd Cymru – Welsh Parliament: Vale of Clwyd
- List of places UK Wales Denbighshire 53.175°N 3.337°W Map of the community

Llandyrnog is a large village and community in Denbighshire, Wales lying in the valley of the River Clwyd, about 3 miles (4.8 km) from Denbigh and 5 miles (8.0 km) from Ruthin. The village has good road links to Denbigh and the main A541 road at Bodfari, and is served by buses number 76 and 53. The village contains the Church of St. Tyrnog's is a Grade II* listed building, and has a notable creamery on the outskirts and former hospital. The community includes the settlements of Waen, Ffordd-las and Llangwyfan.

== Landmarks ==
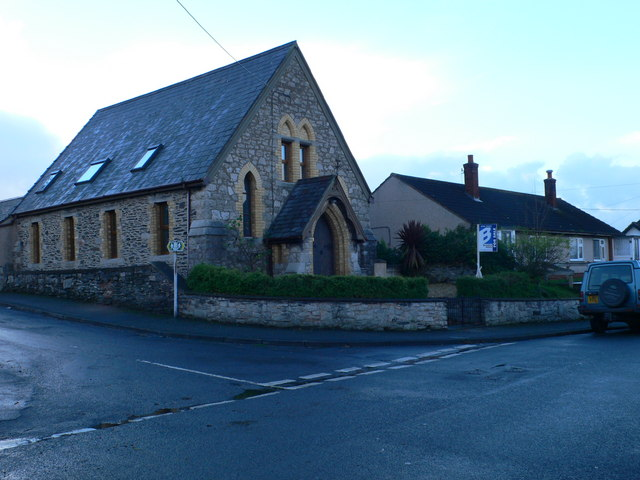
Converted chapel in Llandyrnog

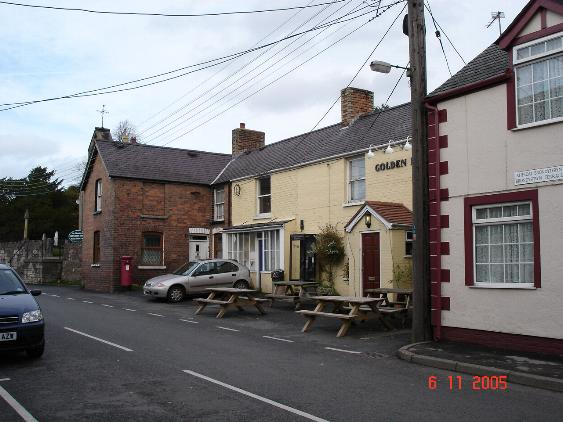
The Golden Lion

The Church of St. Tyrnog's, a small Welsh-language chapel, is a Grade II* listed building in the village. The church was first mentioned in 1254, though the current building dates to the late 15th century. The church was extensively studied by Glynne in 1847 and Lloyd-Williams and Underwood in 1872 before being renovated in 1876–8 by W E Nesfield.

The area is home to the Kinmel Arms, The White Horse and the Golden Lion public houses. The Golden Lion is the spiritual home of Llandyrnog United football club. The club was founded here in 1975 and has a Golden Lion on the club crest, they play their home games at Cae Nant. In the heart of the village there is a small butchers' shop and a general store which includes a post office. Llandyrnog also has a small primary school, Ysgol Bryn Clwyd, which teaches through the medium of English. 1 mile (1.6 km) away at Llangwyfan is what was Colwyn Bay/Abergele Sanatorium. It became Abergele Chest Hospital in 1955 and went on to become centre for ophthalmology in April 2012.

The main employer is the ACC Llandyrnog Creamery on the outskirts of the village, which mostly produces hard pressed and cheddar cheese. The creamery's chief investor since 2014 has been Arla Foods.

== Governance ==
An electoral ward in the same name exists. This stretches both north and south of Llandyrnog. It had a total population of 2,156 at the 2011 census.

== Notable people ==
- William Roberts: according to local tradition he was born at Plas Bennett, in the parish of Llandyrnog, Denbighshire, and belonged to the Roberts family that long resided there. He died at the rectory of Llandyrnog, and was buried in the chancel of that church.
- Hafina Clwyd, journalist; raised on a farm at Llandyrnog.
- Gwen ferch Ellis: The earliest person convicted and executed for witchcraft in Wales.
- Sharleen Spiteri, lead singer of Texas and celebrity chef Bryn Williams married at St Tynon's church in 2018.
