= Llanrhaeadr-yng-Nghinmeirch =

Village and community in Denbighshire, Wales

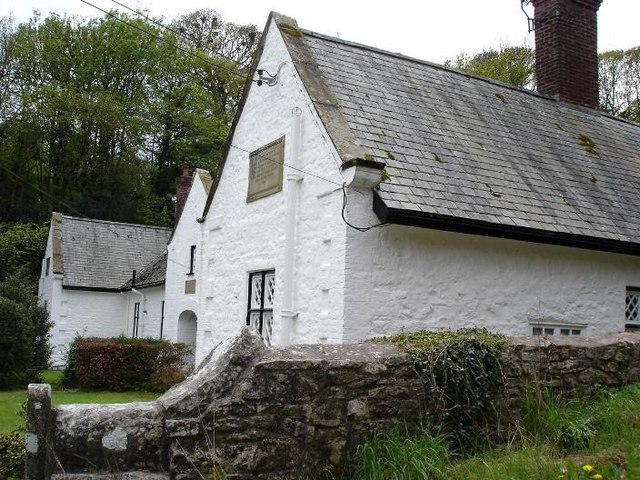
- Almshouses in Llanrhaeadr. The inscription reads that Lord Bagot, great great nephew of the foundress, repaired and improved the houses in 1820.

- Location within Denbighshire
- Population: 1,038 (2011)
- OS grid reference: SJ080634
- Community: Llanrhaeadr-yng-Nghinmeirch
- Principal area: Denbighshire
- Country: Wales
- Sovereign state: United Kingdom
- Post town: DENBIGH
- Postcode district: LL16
- Dialling code: 01745
- Police: North Wales
- Fire: North Wales
- Ambulance: Welsh
- UK Parliament: Clwyd West
- Senedd Cymru – Welsh Parliament: Clwyd West
- List of places UK Wales Denbighshire 53.160°N 3.375°W Map of the community

Llanrhaeadr-yng-Nghinmeirch is a village and local government community in Denbighshire, Wales, including the villages of Prion, Llanrhaeadr and Pentre Llanrhaeadr and several hamlets, including Saron, Pant Pastynog, Prion, Peniel and part of Mynydd Hiraethog. It lies in the Vale of Clwyd near the A525 road between Denbigh and Ruthin. It was also known under the anglicised spellings of Llanrhaiadr in Kinmerch in the nineteenth century, and Llanrhaiadr yn Cinmerch, officially until 6 September 1968. The Community population taken at the 2011 census was 1,038.

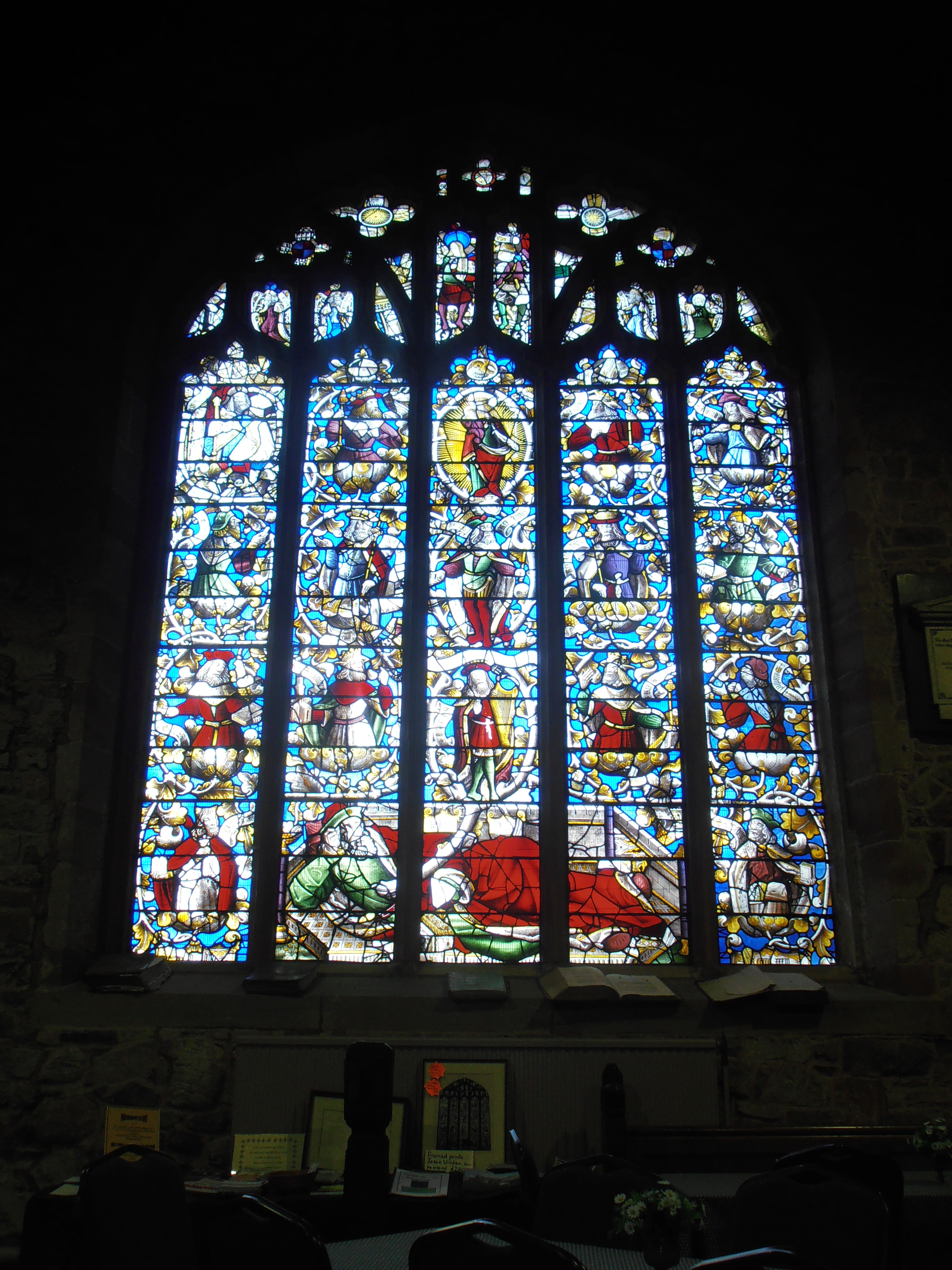
The Tree of Jesse stained glass window in St Dyfnog's Church

The medieval parish church of St Dyfnog contains a Tree of Jesse window, dating from 1533, described as "the finest glass window in all Wales, exceeded by few in England", which was originally part of Basingwerk Abbey near Holywell. Nearby is St Dyfnog's Well, once a destination for pilgrims.

There is a primary school in a comparatively modern building, and the 16th-century King's Head public house in the village centre.

Llanrhaiadr railway station served the village between 1862 and 1953.

== Governance ==
An electoral ward in the same name exists. This ward stretches south with a total population at the 2011 census of 1,856.
