= List of scheduled monuments in Denbighshire =

The county of Denbighshire is in north-east Wales, occupying the Vale of Clwyd and the uplands to the west, east and south. There are 168 scheduled monuments in the county. The oldest is from 225,000 years ago, the oldest inhabited site in Wales. A further three limestone cave systems also have Paleolithic deposits. Three chambered tombs date to the Neolithic. The moorlands in particular are home to many of the 100 Bronze Age and Iron Age, the vast majority of which are burial mounds. There are some 21 hill forts and other enclosure sites, and several stone circles. There are only three sites from the Roman period, and none dating to Early Medieval times. From the Medieval period itself on the other hand, there are 40 sites, including castles, town walls, chapels, crosses, domestic buildings, defensive buildings, bridges and monastic sites. There are 18 post-medieval sites, being a very diverse mix of site types and dates. Most notable is the World Heritage Site at Pontcysyllte Aqueduct. The modern county of Denbighshire bears only slight alignment with the historic county of the same name. The modern county includes parts of historic Merionethshire and Flintshire.

Scheduled monuments have statutory protection. It is illegal to disturb the ground surface or any standing remains. The compilation of the list is undertaken by Cadw Welsh Historic Monuments, which is an executive agency of the National Assembly of Wales. The list of scheduled monuments below is supplied by Cadw with additional material from RCAHMW and Clwyd-Powys Archaeological Trust.

== Scheduled monuments in Denbighshire ==
Image	Name	Site type	Community	Location	Details	Historic elisounty	Period	SAM No & Refs
	Bontnewydd Cave	Cave	Cefnmeiriadog	53.2271°N 3.4763°W, SJ015710	Cave excavated in 1985, which found Neanderthal jaw and teeth remains dated to 225,000 years ago, along with stone tools. These are the oldest hominid remains in Wales.	Denbighshire	Prehistoric (palaeolithic)	DE116
	Cefn Caves	Cave	Cefnmeiriadog	53.2227°N 3.4685°W, SJ020705	Network of caves first excavated in the 1830s, finding fragments of stone tools along with numerous animal bones over a wide period, probably accumulated in the caves by water action.	Denbighshire	Prehistoric (palaeolithic and later)	DE115
	Cae Gwyn Cave	Cave	Tremeirchion	53.2414°N 3.3722°W, SJ085724	Cave with worked flint tools. Dated to 16,000BC.	Flintshire	Prehistoric (palaeolithic)	FL070
Ffynnon Beuno cave	Ffynnon Beuno Cave	Cave	Tremeirchion	53.241°N 3.3719°W, SJ085724	Limestone cave, where flint tools and animal bones have been found.	Flintshire	Prehistoric (palaeolithic)	FL069
	Branas-Uchaf Round Barrow	Chambered tomb	Llandrillo	52.926°N 3.4723°W, SJ011375	Chambered tomb with central chamber still in situ, but no capstone.	Merionethshire	Prehistoric (Neolithic)	ME070
	Tyddyn Bleiddyn Burial Chamber	Chambered long cairn	Cefnmeiriadog	53.2399°N 3.4889°W, SJ007724	Two cairns excavated in the mid-19th century. They found numerous crouched inhumations in two cists, with passageways.	Denbighshire	Prehistoric (Neolithic)	DE007
	Tan-y-Coed Burial Chamber	Chambered long cairn	Llandrillo	52.9455°N 3.4188°W, SJ047396		Merionethshire	Prehistoric (Neolithic)	ME048
	Round Barrow 135m SE of Lodge Farm	Round barrow	Bodfari	53.2375°N 3.3423°W, SJ105720		Flintshire	Prehistoric	FL034
	Gribin Oernant Cairn	Round barrow	Bryneglwys	53.0122°N 3.2281°W, SJ177468		Denbighshire	Prehistoric	DE271
	Pant y Maen Round Barrow	Round barrow	Bryneglwys	53.0207°N 3.2558°W, SJ158477		Denbighshire	Prehistoric	DE034
	Rhos Lydan Round Barrows	Round barrow	Bryneglwys	53.0367°N 3.2519°W, SJ161495		Denbighshire	Prehistoric	DE035
	Ty Mawr Round Barrows	Round barrow	Bryneglwys	53.0248°N 3.2531°W, SJ160482		Denbighshire	Prehistoric	DE033
	Bedd Emlyn	Round barrow	Clocaenog	53.068°N 3.4155°W, SJ052532		Denbighshire	Prehistoric	DE201
	Bryn Beddau Round Barrows	Round barrow	Clocaenog	53.0648°N 3.4203°W, SJ049528	Group of Bronze Age barrows in Clocaenog Forest discovered when forest roads were built in the 1960s. One of the barrows may be a stone circle. The site includes 'Bedd Emlyn' which had an early medieval ogham stone, removed in 1813 and now in the National Museum of Wales.	Denbighshire	Prehistoric (Bronze Age)	DE040
	Bryn Beddau Stone Circle	Stone circle	Clocaenog	53.0619°N 3.4232°W, SJ047525	Prehistoric stone circle of at least 19 stones, within Clocaenog Forest, in a heather-covered clearing.	Denbighshire	Prehistoric	DE245
	Maen Llwyd Standing Stone	Standing stone	Clocaenog	53.0601°N 3.4219°W, SJ048523	Massive stone, 3.4m long, now lying down. It is within Clocaenog Forest.	Denbighshire	Prehistoric	DE255
	Plas Perthi Burial Mound	Round barrow	Clocaenog	53.0769°N 3.3499°W, SJ096541		Denbighshire	Prehistoric	DE192
	Rug Mound	Round barrow	Corwen	52.9839°N 3.4075°W, SJ056438		Merionethshire	Prehistoric	ME019
	Two Cairns North of Plasnewydd	Round cairn	Corwen	52.9616°N 3.2947°W, SJ131412		Denbighshire	Prehistoric	DE272
	Wilderness Round Barrows	Round barrow	Corwen, (also Llangollen), (also Llansantffraid Glyn Ceiriog), (see also Wrexham)	52.9539°N 3.2298°W, SJ174403		Denbighshire	Prehistoric	DE092
	Round Barrow 400m SE of Tai Marian	Round barrow	Cwm	53.2836°N 3.3876°W, SJ075771		Flintshire	Prehistoric	FL041
	Three Round Barrows in Cwm Wood	Round barrow	Cwm	53.2785°N 3.3866°W, SJ076766		Flintshire	Prehistoric	FL192
	Capel Hiraethog Earth Circles	Ring cairn	Cyffylliog	53.0801°N 3.4402°W, SJ036546		Denbighshire	Prehistoric	DE043
	Capel Hiraethog Round Barrow	Round barrow	Cyffylliog	53.0789°N 3.4455°W, SJ032544		Denbighshire	Prehistoric	DE042
	Moel yr Henfaes Cairn Cemetery	Round cairn	Cynwyd	52.9428°N 3.3894°W, SJ067392		Merionethshire	Prehistoric	DE301
	Moel yr Henfaes Ring Cairn	Ring cairn	Cynwyd	52.9377°N 3.3781°W, SJ074387		Merionethshire	Prehistoric	DE299
	Nant Croes-y-wernen Stone Circle	Stone circle	Cynwyd	52.9414°N 3.3435°W, SJ098390		Merionethshire	Prehistoric	DE300
	Garw Fynydd Cairn	Platform Cairn	Derwen	53.0479°N 3.4134°W, SJ053510		Denbighshire	Prehistoric	DE274
	Coed Plas Round Barrow	Round barrow	Henllan	53.2067°N 3.4498°W, SJ032687		Denbighshire	Prehistoric	DE050
	Old Foxhall Round Barrow	Round barrow	Henllan	53.1948°N 3.4481°W, SJ033673		Denbighshire	Prehistoric	DE052
	Plas Heaton Round Barrow	Round barrow	Henllan	53.2055°N 3.4496°W, SJ032685		Denbighshire	Prehistoric	DE049
	Plas-Meifod Round Barrow	Round barrow	Henllan	53.2019°N 3.4573°W, SJ027681		Denbighshire	Prehistoric	DE051
	Moel y Plas Round Barrow	Round barrow	Llanarmon-yn-Ial	53.0897°N 3.2404°W, SJ170554		Denbighshire	Prehistoric	DE062
	Tyn-y-Mynydd Round Barrow	Round barrow	Llanarmon-yn-Ial	53.0934°N 3.2435°W, SJ168558		Denbighshire	Prehistoric	DE061
	Moel Eithinen Round Barrow	Round barrow	Llanbedr Dyffryn Clwyd	53.1224°N 3.2595°W, SJ158591		Denbighshire	Prehistoric	DE280
	Moel Gyw Round Barrow	Round barrow	Llanbedr Dyffryn Clwyd	53.1086°N 3.2391°W, SJ171575		Denbighshire	Prehistoric	DE063
	Mynydd Cricor Barrow	Round barrow	Llanbedr Dyffryn Clwyd	53.0435°N 3.2738°W, SJ146503		Denbighshire	Prehistoric	DE266
	Abersychnant Cairn	Round barrow	Llandegla	53.0385°N 3.143°W, SJ234496		Denbighshire	Prehistoric	DE264
	Cas-Gan-Ditw Round Barrow	Round barrow	Llandegla	53.0637°N 3.1469°W, SJ232524		Denbighshire	Prehistoric	DE169
	Cefn y Cist Cairn	Round barrow	Llandegla	53.0297°N 3.1366°W, SJ238486		Denbighshire	Prehistoric	DE269
	Cefn y Gader Round Barrows	Round barrow	Llandegla, (also Penycae), (also Minera), (see also Wrexham)	53.0393°N 3.1384°W, SJ237497		Denbighshire	Prehistoric	DE070
	Craig-y-Forwyn Cairn	Round cairn	Llandegla	53.0246°N 3.139°W, SJ236480		Denbighshire	Prehistoric	DE267
	Cryn-y-Brain Round Barrow	Round barrow	Llandegla	53.0303°N 3.1523°W, SJ228487		Denbighshire	Prehistoric	DE270
	Cyrn y Brain Round Barrows	Round barrow	Llandegla	53.0384°N 3.1747°W, SJ213496		Denbighshire	Prehistoric	DE065
	Llyn Cyfnwy Round Barrow	Round barrow	Llandegla	53.0842°N 3.1745°W, SJ214547		Denbighshire	Prehistoric	DE064
	Maes Maelor Round Barrow	Round barrow	Llandegla	53.0653°N 3.1466°W, SJ232526		Denbighshire	Prehistoric	DE056
	Rhos-Ddigre Caves	Cave	Llandegla	53.0737°N 3.2135°W, SJ187536	Group of 5 caves with Bronze Age burials	Denbighshire	Prehistoric (Bronze Age)	DE119
	Blaen Llynor Round Cairn	Round cairn	Llandrillo	52.9203°N 3.3622°W, SJ085367		Merionethshire	Prehistoric	DE302
	Cader Bronwen Round Barrow	Round barrow	Llandrillo	52.9014°N 3.3729°W, SJ077346		Denbighshire	Prehistoric	DE060
	Cairns, Settlements & Field Systems of Prehistoric & Medieval date at Pennant above Nant Esgeiriau	Ring cairn	Llandrillo	52.8884°N 3.4175°W, SJ047332		Merionethshire	Prehistoric	ME146
	Carnedd y Ci Barrow	Round cairn	Llandrillo	52.8945°N 3.405°W, SJ055339		Denbighshire	Prehistoric	DE260
	Cefn Penagored Cairn and Ring Cairn	Kerb cairn	Llandrillo	52.8914°N 3.4298°W, SJ038336		Denbighshire	Prehistoric	DE257
	Cefn Penagored Ridge Cairns	Kerb cairn	Llandrillo	52.891°N 3.4267°W, SJ041335		Denbighshire	Prehistoric	DE256
	Moel Sych Round Barrow	Round barrow	Llandrillo, (also Llanrhaeadr-ym-Mochnant), (see also Powys)	52.8761°N 3.3887°W, SJ066318		Denbighshire	Prehistoric	DE067
	Moel Ty-Uchaf Circles	Stone circle	Llandrillo	52.9232°N 3.4051°W, SJ056371	A circle of 43 stones, probably representing the kerbs of a burial mound. A central hollow could be a robbed-out grave.	Merionethshire	Prehistoric	ME013
	Nant Esgeiriau Cairn	Round cairn	Llandrillo	52.8856°N 3.4221°W, SJ044329		Denbighshire	Prehistoric	DE259
	Nant Gwyn Round Cairns	Round cairn	Llandrillo	52.9234°N 3.3737°W, SJ077371		Merionethshire	Prehistoric	DE305
	Pennant Cairns	Round barrow	Llandrillo	52.889°N 3.4241°W, SJ042333		Denbighshire	Prehistoric	DE258
	Ring Cairn E of Ffridd Camen	Ring cairn	Llandrillo	52.8992°N 3.4175°W, SJ047344		Merionethshire	Prehistoric	ME147
	Two Ring Cairns West of Cwm Tywyll	Ring cairn	Llandrillo	52.8939°N 3.4269°W, SJ041338		Merionethshire	Prehistoric	ME145
	Tyfos Stone Circle	Stone circle	Llandrillo	52.9374°N 3.447°W, SJ028388	Thirteen recumbent stones define the kerb of a cairn	Merionethshire	Prehistoric (Bronze Age)	ME024
	Tom Dongen Round Barrow	Round barrow	Llanelidan	53.0315°N 3.3229°W, SJ113490		Denbighshire	Prehistoric	DE072
	Cefn Coch Tumulus	Round barrow	Llanfair Dyffryn Clwyd	53.1022°N 3.2839°W, SJ141568		Denbighshire	Prehistoric	DE265
	Moel Llech Round Barrow	Round barrow	Llanfair Dyffryn Clwyd	53.0935°N 3.2438°W, SJ168558		Denbighshire	Prehistoric	DE108
	Ffynnon-Las Wood Round Barrow	Round barrow	Llangollen	52.9603°N 3.1988°W, SJ195409		Denbighshire	Prehistoric	DE091
	Circular Platforms North West of Hen Ddinbych	Platform Cairn	Llanrhaeadr-yng-Nghinmeirch	53.0967°N 3.5102°W, SH989565		Denbighshire	Prehistoric	DE087
	Twr yr Hill Round Barrow	Round barrow	Llanrhaeadr-yng-Nghinmeirch	53.1117°N 3.479°W, SJ010581		Denbighshire	Prehistoric	DE088
	Craig Arthur Kerb Cairn	Kerb cairn	Llantysilio	53.0153°N 3.1593°W, SJ223470		Denbighshire	Prehistoric	DE262
	Creigiau Eglwyseg Cairn	Round cairn	Llantysilio	52.992°N 3.1608°W, SJ221444		Denbighshire	Prehistoric	DE261
	Creigiau Eglwyseg Round Barrow	Round barrow	Llantysilio	52.9988°N 3.1496°W, SJ229452		Denbighshire	Prehistoric	DE079
	Creigiau Eglwyseg Round Barrows & Earth Circle	Round barrow	Llantysilio	52.9962°N 3.1598°W, SJ222449		Denbighshire	Prehistoric	DE081
	Creigiau Eglwyseg Stone Circle	Stone circle	Llantysilio	52.9979°N 3.1515°W, SJ228451	Possible stone circle, or kerbs of a cairn.	Denbighshire	Prehistoric	DE080
	Eglwyseg Mountain Round Barrow	Round barrow	Llantysilio, (also Penycae), (see also Wrexham)	53.0086°N 3.147°W, SJ231463		Denbighshire	Prehistoric	DE066
Eliseg's illar	Eliseg's Pillar	Round barrow with inscribed pillar	Llantysilio	52.9921°N 3.1893°W, SJ202445	Erected by Cyngen ap Cadell (died 855), king of Powys in honour of his great-grandfather Elisedd ap Gwylog. The form Eliseg found on the pillar is thought to be a mistake by the carver of the inscription. The pillar stands on a Bronze Age burial mound.	Denbighshire	Prehistoric	DE015
	Moel Gamelin Round Barrow	Round barrow	Llantysilio	53.0096°N 3.2291°W, SJ176465		Denbighshire	Prehistoric	DE068
	Rhewl Round Barrows	Round barrow	Llanynys	53.1329°N 3.3261°W, SJ113603		Denbighshire	Prehistoric	DE167
	Bwlch-Du Round Barrow	Round barrow	Nantglyn	53.11°N 3.5114°W, SH989580		Denbighshire	Prehistoric	DE085
	Gorsedd Bran Round Barrows	Platform Cairn	Nantglyn	53.1296°N 3.5351°W, SH973602		Denbighshire	Prehistoric	DE168
	Round Barrow at Coed Bell, Gronant	Round barrow	Prestatyn	53.3351°N 3.3718°W, SJ087828		Flintshire	Prehistoric	FL188
	Round Barrow West of Ty Draw	Round barrow	Prestatyn	53.319°N 3.3976°W, SJ069811		Flintshire	Prehistoric	FL112
	Castle Farm Round Barrow	Round barrow	Ruthin	53.1126°N 3.3075°W, SJ125580		Denbighshire	Prehistoric	DE105
	Criafol Round Barrow	Round barrow	Tremeirchion	53.2742°N 3.3614°W, SJ093761		Flintshire	Prehistoric	FL170
	Round Barrow 270m NW of Traveller's Inn	Round barrow	Tremeirchion	53.2727°N 3.335°W, SJ110759		Flintshire	Prehistoric	FL047
	Round Barrow 800m NE of Criafol Farm	Round barrow	Tremeirchion	53.2797°N 3.3492°W, SJ101767		Flintshire	Prehistoric	FL048
	Two Round Barrows on Moel Maen Efa	Round barrow	Tremeirchion	53.2583°N 3.3703°W, SJ086743		Flintshire	Prehistoric	FL049
	Coed Clwyd Cairns	Round barrow	Waen	53.1424°N 3.2576°W, SJ159613		Denbighshire	Prehistoric	DE248
	Dinas Melin-y-Wig	Hillfort	Betws Gwerfil Goch	53.0312°N 3.4193°W, SJ049491		Merionethshire	Prehistoric	ME014
	Mynydd Rhyd Ddu Enclosure	Hillfort	Betws Gwerfil Goch	53.0187°N 3.4104°W, SJ054477		Denbighshire	Prehistoric	DE252
	Moel y Gaer	Hillfort	Bodfari	53.2265°N 3.3568°W, SJ095707		Flintshire	Prehistoric	FL073
Moel y Gaer, Llantysilio	Moel y Gaer, Cefn	Hillfort	Bryneglwys	53.0081°N 3.2428°W, SJ167463		Denbighshire	Prehistoric	DE126
Footpath up Bedd y Cawr	Bedd-y-Cawr Hillfort	Hillfort	Cefnmeiriadog	53.2364°N 3.4799°W, SJ013720	Hillfort on natural inland promontory with ditch and bank and an area of 0.8 hectares (2.0 acres)	Denbighshire	Prehistoric	DE037
	Pont Petryal Caerau Circles	Enclosure	Clocaenog	53.0581°N 3.429°W, SJ043521		Denbighshire	Prehistoric	DE041
	Bwrdd y Tri Arglwydd Boundary Stone	Boundary stone	Corwen	53.011°N 3.3364°W, SJ104468	Possible remnant of a cromlech, or a medieval boundary stones. It is at the junction of four parishes.	Merionethshire	Prehistoric	ME025
	Caer Drewen Camp	Hillfort	Corwen	52.9892°N 3.3601°W, SJ087444		Merionethshire	Prehistoric	ME012
	Moel Fodig Camp	Hillfort	Corwen	53.0007°N 3.3482°W, SJ096456		Merionethshire	Prehistoric	ME051
	Y Garth Camp	Enclosure	Cyffylliog	53.1174°N 3.3751°W, SJ080586		Denbighshire	Prehistoric	DE103
	Gwerclas Mound	Mound	Cynwyd	52.9682°N 3.4101°W, SJ053421		Merionethshire	Prehistoric	ME069
	Y Gaerwen Enclosure, Llangar	Enclosure	Cynwyd	52.9547°N 3.4498°W, SJ027406		Merionethshire	Prehistoric	ME091
	Moel Hiraddug Hillfort	Hillfort	Dyserth	53.2937°N 3.4057°W, SJ064783		Flintshire	Prehistoric	FL012
	Craig Adwywynt Camp	Hillfort	Efenechtyd	53.0793°N 3.3129°W, SJ121543		Denbighshire	Prehistoric	DE073
	Pen-y-Gaer Camp	Hillfort	Efenechtyd	53.0832°N 3.3364°W, SJ105548		Denbighshire	Prehistoric	DE045
	Moel Fenlli Camp	Hillfort	Llanbedr Dyffryn Clwyd	53.1314°N 3.2523°W, SJ163600		Denbighshire	Prehistoric	DE009
View of Moel y Gaer from the south	Moel-y-Gaer Camp	Hillfort	Llanbedr Dyffryn Clwyd	53.146°N 3.2742°W, SJ148617	An oval Iron Age hillfort overlooking the Vale of Clwyd.	Denbighshire	Prehistoric	DE010
	Craig yr Uchain	Enclosure	Llandrillo	52.9179°N 3.4523°W, SJ024366		Denbighshire	Prehistoric	DE230
	Platform Settlement by Clochnant E of Cadwst	Unenclosed hut circle	Llandrillo	52.9058°N 3.4186°W, SJ046352		Merionethshire	Prehistoric	ME148
	Moel Arthur Camp	Hillfort	Llandyrnog, (also Nannerch), (see also Flintshire)	53.1846°N 3.2806°W, SJ145660		Flintshire	Prehistoric	FL010
	Pen-y-Cloddiau Camp	Hillfort	Llandyrnog, (also Ysceifiog), (see also Flintshire)	53.1986°N 3.3054°W, SJ128676		Flintshire	Prehistoric	FL009
	Prestatyn Roman Site	Settlement	Prestatyn	53.3253°N 3.4104°W, SJ061818		Flintshire	Roman	FL094
	Blaen-y-Cwm Inscribed Stone (Now in Llandrillo Church)	Inscribed stone	Llandrillo	52.9223°N 3.4379°W, SJ034370		Merionethshire	Roman	ME066
	Plas-newydd Romano-British temple cropmark	Temple	Llanfair Dyffryn Clwyd	53.0919°N 3.2901°W, SJ137557		Denbighshire	Roman	DE289
	Ffynnon Fair (Well), Cefn	Holy Well	Cefnmeiriadog	53.2278°N 3.4557°W, SJ029710		Denbighshire	Medieval	DE038
	Corwen Churchyard Cross	Cross	Corwen	52.98°N 3.3736°W, SJ079433		Merionethshire	Medieval	ME052
Owain Glyndwrs Mount	Owain Glyndwr's Mount	Motte	Corwen	52.9781°N 3.3046°W, SJ125431		Merionethshire	Medieval	ME017
	Coed Llynor Long Hut	Deserted Rural Settlement	Cynwyd	52.9242°N 3.3851°W, SJ069372		Merionethshire	Medieval	DE304
All Saints' Church, Llangar	Llangar Old Parish Church	Church	Cynwyd	52.9712°N 3.3959°W, SJ063424		Merionethshire	Medieval	ME093
	Coed Clattwn Moated Site	Moated Site	Denbigh	53.2076°N 3.431°W, SJ045687		Denbighshire	Medieval	DE234
Denbigh Castle	Denbigh Castle and Medieval Town	Castle	Denbigh	53.1806°N 3.4206°W, SJ051657		Denbighshire	Medieval	DE156
Denbigh Friary	Denbigh Friary	Friary	Denbigh	53.1878°N 3.4091°W, SJ059665		Denbighshire	Medieval	DE023
Denbigh fortified town wall	Denbigh Medieval Town (North - Eastern Corner)	Town	Denbigh	53.1816°N 3.4191°W, SJ052658		Denbighshire	Medieval	DE225
Burgess Gate, DenbighTown Walls	Denbigh Town Walls	Town defences	Denbigh	53.1808°N 3.4191°W, SJ052657		Denbighshire	Medieval	DE002
	Llys Gwenllian Mound & Bailey	Motte & Bailey	Denbigh	53.1682°N 3.4131°W, SJ056643		Denbighshire	Medieval	DE019
St Hilary's Tower, Denbigh	Denbigh, St Hilary's Chapel	Tower	Denbigh	53.1818°N 3.4198°W, SJ052659		Denbighshire	Medieval	DE005
	Derwen Churchyard Cross	Cross	Derwen	53.0457°N 3.3882°W, SJ070507		Denbighshire	Medieval	DE162
	Dyserth Castle	Castle	Dyserth	53.3079°N 3.4111°W, SJ060799		Flintshire	Medieval	FL130
	Siamber-Wen Medieval House	House (domestic)	Dyserth	53.3057°N 3.4101°W, SJ061796		Flintshire	Medieval	FL063
	Old Foxhall Earth Circle	Enclosure	Henllan	53.195°N 3.4465°W, SJ034674		Denbighshire	Medieval	DE053
	Pysgodlan Moated Site	Moated Site	Henllan	53.2122°N 3.4394°W, SJ039693		Denbighshire	Medieval	DE200
	Tomen y Faerdre Castle Mound	Motte	Llanarmon-yn-Ial	53.0964°N 3.2062°W, SJ193561		Denbighshire	Medieval	DE006
St Meugan's Church, Llanrhydd	Churchyard Cross, St Meugan's Church	Cross	Llanbedr Dyffryn Clwyd	53.11°N 3.2861°W, SJ140577		Denbighshire	Medieval	DE188
	Tomen y Rhodwydd (Castell yr Adwy) Mound and Bailey Castle	Motte & Bailey	Llandegla	53.0553°N 3.2294°W, SJ176516		Denbighshire	Medieval	DE018
	Cwm Tywyll House Platforms	House platform	Llandrillo	52.8944°N 3.4192°W, SJ046339		Denbighshire	Medieval	DE249
	Ffridd Camen Hafodydd	Platform house	Llandrillo	52.9003°N 3.4225°W, SJ044345		Denbighshire	Medieval	DE250
	Ffridd Camen Long Hut	Rectangular hut	Llandrillo	52.9019°N 3.4213°W, SJ044347		Denbighshire	Medieval	DE251
	Ffridd yr Eglwys Deserted Rural Settlement	Rectangular hut	Llandrillo	52.8899°N 3.4361°W, SJ034334		Denbighshire	Medieval	DE254
	Gwern Wynodl Hafod	Platform house	Llandrillo	52.908°N 3.4223°W, SJ044354		Denbighshire	Medieval	DE247
	Nant Gwyn Long Hut	Deserted Rural Settlement	Llandrillo	52.9261°N 3.3872°W, SJ068374		Merionethshire	Medieval	DE306
	Coed Henblas Moated Site	Moated Site	Llanfair Dyffryn Clwyd	53.087°N 3.2748°W, SJ147551		Denbighshire	Medieval	DE232
	Castell Dinas Bran	Castle	Llangollen	52.979°N 3.1584°W, SJ223430		Denbighshire	Medieval	DE021
Llangollen Bridge	Llangollen Bridge	Bridge	Llangollen	52.971°N 3.1702°W, SJ215421		Denbighshire	Medieval	DE026
	Hen Ddinbych Circular Platforms	Enclosure	Llanrhaeadr-yng-Nghinmeirch	53.0949°N 3.5093°W, SH990563		Denbighshire	Medieval	DE086
Valle Crucis Abbey	Valle Crucis Abbey	Abbey	Llantysilio	52.9888°N 3.1867°W, SJ204441		Denbighshire	Medieval	DE003
	Prestatyn Castle	Castle	Prestatyn	53.3383°N 3.3943°W, SJ072833	An earth mound south of Prestatyn railway station.	Flintshire	Medieval	FL024
	Criccin Cross	Cross shaft	Rhuddlan	53.2826°N 3.4396°W, SJ041771		Flintshire	Medieval	FL102
	Part of site of Rhuddlan Norman Borough	Town	Rhuddlan	53.2882°N 3.4617°W, SJ026778		Flintshire	Medieval	FL129
Rhuddlan bridge over the River Clwyd, with church and castle	Rhuddlan Bridge	Bridge	Rhuddlan	53.2899°N 3.4689°W, SJ021779		Flintshire	Medieval	FL018
Rhuddlan Castle	Rhuddlan Castle	Castle	Rhuddlan	53.2891°N 3.465°W, SJ024779		Flintshire	Medieval	FL004
	Rhuddlan Town Banks	Town defences	Rhuddlan	53.2925°N 3.468°W, SJ022782		Flintshire	Medieval	FL068
	Twthill, Rhuddlan	Motte & Bailey	Rhuddlan	53.2871°N 3.4619°W, SJ026776		Flintshire	Medieval	FL015
	Ffynogion Moated Site	Moated Site	Ruthin	53.0958°N 3.3032°W, SJ128561		Denbighshire	Medieval	DE074
Ruthin Castle, showing the gatehouse	Ruthin Castle	Castle	Ruthin	53.1124°N 3.3116°W, SJ123580		Denbighshire	Medieval	DE022
	Deeside Slateworks	Water Power System	Corwen	52.9686°N 3.269°W, SJ148420		Denbighshire	Post-Medieval/Modern	DE246
	Pont Carrog	Bridge	Corwen	52.9835°N 3.3192°W, SJ115437		Merionethshire	Post-Medieval/Modern	ME029
	Rhug ornamental wrought iron gates	Gate	Corwen	52.9824°N 3.4097°W, SJ054437		Merionethshire	Post-Medieval/Modern	ME047
Rhug Chapel: part of carved interior	Rug Chapel	Chapel	Corwen	52.9842°N 3.3942°W, SJ064438		Merionethshire	Post-Medieval/Modern	ME089
	Pont Dyfrdwy	Bridge	Cynwyd	52.9602°N 3.4114°W, SJ052412		Merionethshire	Post-Medieval/Modern	ME033
	Civil War Earthworks	Siegeworks	Denbigh	53.182°N 3.4168°W, SJ054659		Denbighshire	Post-Medieval/Modern	DE028
Leicester's Church from Leicester Terrace	Leicester's Church, Denbigh	Church	Denbigh	53.1822°N 3.419°W, SJ053659	The only large-scale church building project in Elizabethan England or Wales. Built, but left unfinished, by Robert Dudley, 1st Earl of Leicester, it now stands as a ruin in the centre of Denbigh.	Denbighshire	Post-Medieval/Modern	DE044
	Clive Engine House, Meliden	Engine house	Dyserth	53.3085°N 3.4179°W, SJ056799	Built in 1862, to house a pump for the Talargoch lead mine.	Flintshire	Post-Medieval/Modern	FL136
	New Foxhall Dovecot	Dovecote	Henllan	53.1955°N 3.4531°W, SJ030674		Denbighshire	Post-Medieval/Modern	DE055
	New Foxhall House	House (domestic)	Henllan	53.1958°N 3.4537°W, SJ029675		Denbighshire	Post-Medieval/Modern	DE054
	Pont Cilan	Bridge	Llandrillo	52.9256°N 3.4575°W, SJ021374		Merionethshire	Post-Medieval/Modern	ME032
Canal boat on the aqueduct	Pontcysyllte Aqueduct and Canal	Aqueduct	Llangollen, (also Llangollen Rural), (also Chirk), (see also Wrexham)	52.9702°N 3.0878°W, SJ270419	Built in 1805, by Thomas Telford, this is the longest and highest aqueduct in Britain. It carries the Llangollen Canal over the River Dee.	Denbighshire	Post-Medieval/Modern	DE175
The stone is against the half-timbered wall of Exmewe Hall, on St. Peter's Square, Ruthin.	Maen Huail	Stone	Ruthin	53.1144°N 3.3108°W, SJ123582	A square stone block in the centre of Ruthin, "On which tradition states, King Arthur beheaded Huail, brother of Gildas the historian". The stone is against the half-timbered wall of Exmewe Hall, on St. Peter's Square, facing the roundabout.	Denbighshire	Unknown	DE030
Wrought iron gate into St Peter's Churchyard, Ruthin	Ruthin Churchyard Ornamental Wrought Iron Gates & Screen	Gate	Ruthin	53.1151°N 3.3108°W, SJ124583		Denbighshire	Post-Medieval/Modern	DE159
Pont Dafydd, over a former line of the River Clwyd at Waen, St Asaph	Pont Dafydd (old)	Bridge	St Asaph	53.2636°N 3.4349°W, SJ043750		Flintshire	Post-Medieval/Modern	FL027
Bridge the river Elwy, St. Asaph, Wales. (Photo c1900	St Asaph Bridge	Bridge	St Asaph	53.2564°N 3.4476°W, SJ035742		Flintshire	Post-Medieval/Modern	FL026
	Pennant Mines Winding Engine House & Chimney, Rhuallt	Engine house	Tremeirchion	53.2673°N 3.3694°W, SJ087753		Flintshire	Post-Medieval/Modern	FL137
Bodelwyddan Park	First World War Practice Trenches at Bodelwyddan Park	Practice trenches	Bodelwyddan	53.2577°N 3.4999°W, SJ000744		Flintshire	Post-Medieval/Modern	FL186

Scheduled monuments in Denbighshire, Wales.
=Prehistoric =Roman =Early Medieval
=Medieval =Post-Medieval/Modern

== See also ==
- List of Cadw properties
- List of castles in Wales
- List of hill forts in Wales
- Historic houses in Wales
- List of monastic houses in Wales
- List of museums in Wales
- List of Roman villas in Wales
- Prehistoric Wales
