= Bedd-y-Cawr Hillfort =

Iron age hillfort in North Wales

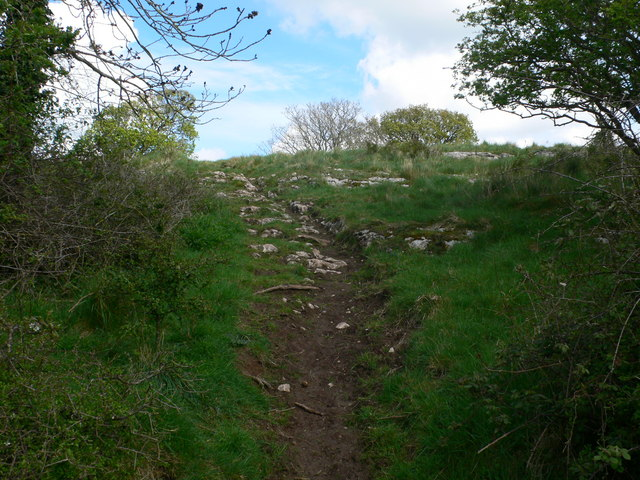
- Path up Bedd-y-Cawr

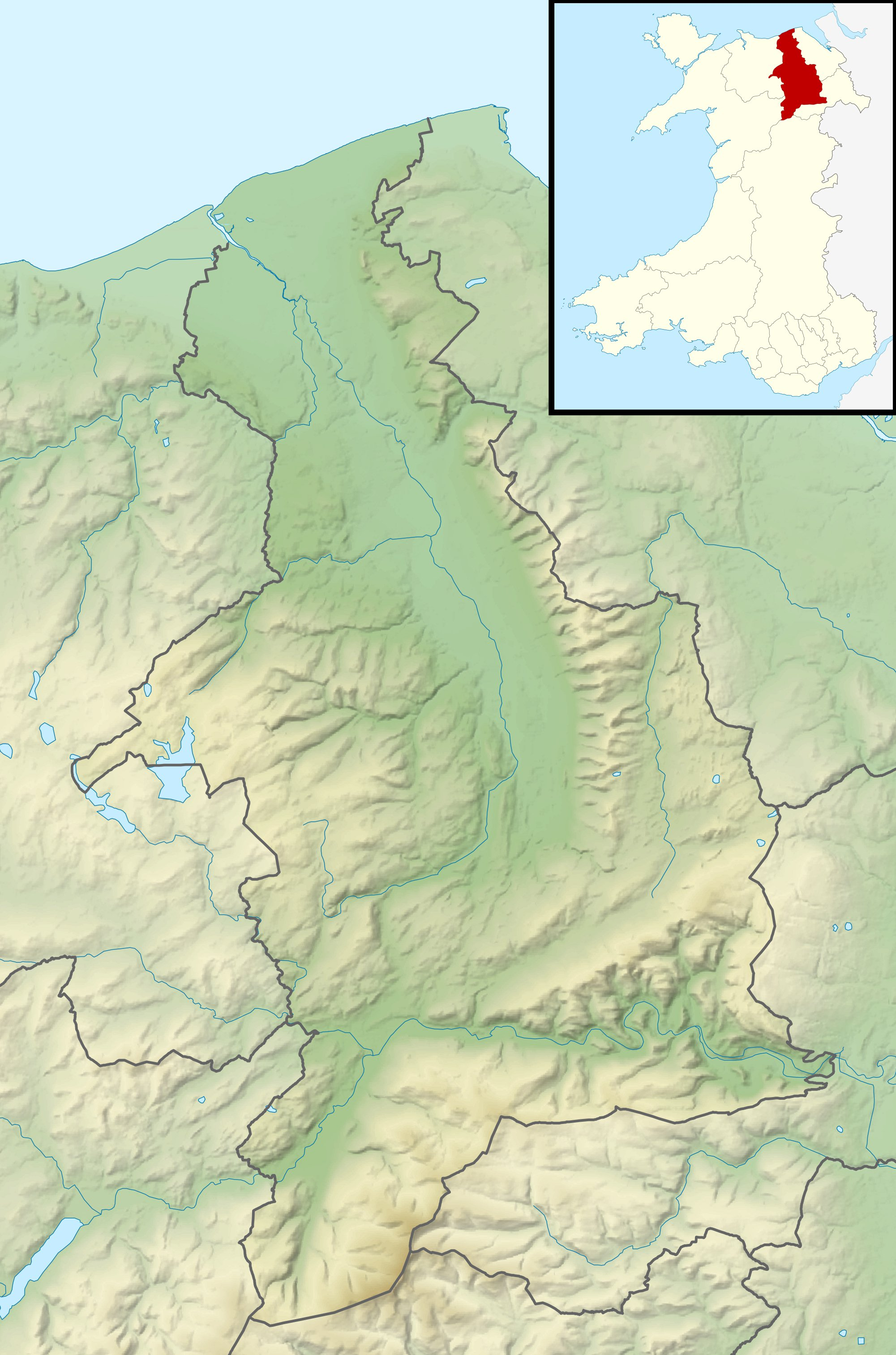
- Location in Denbighshire
- 53.2363°N 3.4799°W
- Type: hillfort
- Location: Denbighshire, Wales
- OS grid reference: SJ 0132 7205

Scheduled monument
- Official name: Bedd-y-Cawr Hillfort
- Reference no.: DE037
- Community: Cefnmeiriadog

Bedd-y-Cawr Hillfort, or Bedd y Cawr Hillfort, is an Iron Age hillfort on a natural inland promontory in the community of Cefnmeiriadog in Denbighshire in North Wales. The name of the hillfort translates from the Welsh as Giant's Tomb.

Bedd-y-Cawr Hillfort is a scheduled monument that lies approximately 3.3 kilometres (2.1 miles) west of St Asaph and 4.0 kilometres (2.5 miles) north of Henllan.

== Description ==
The hillfort is sited at the end of the Cefn Meiriadog ridge of the Rhos Hills which offers views over the River Elwy valley in an area dominated by hillforts. The hillfort is roughly rectangular measuring approximately 156 metres (171 yards) by 74 metres (81 yards) with an area of 0.8 hectares (2.0 acres) and is defined by a ditch and bank to the north-west and the north-east with a simple entrance. On the sides on the west and east it is protected by natural outcrops of limestone.

== Recent history ==
Bedd-y-Cawr was visited by the Royal Commission on the Ancient and Historical Monuments in Wales and Monmouthshire in 1912 and Bedd-y-Cawr and designated as a scheduled monument in 1927.

The area of the designated site was expanded in 1998 (formerly just the interior was scheduled) and is classed as a defensive prehistoric hillfort.

== See also ==
- Moel y Gaer (hillfort in the community of Bodfari 8.3 kilometres (5.2 miles) to the east)
