= Ffynnon Beuno =

Ffynnon Beuno may refer to:

- Ffynnon Beuno and Cae Gwyn Caves, a pair of caves in Denbighshire, Wales
- Ffynnon Beuno, a holy well in Clynnog Fawr, Gwynedd, Wales
