= St Asaph Rural District =

Abolished Welsh rural district

St Asaph
- Area
  - 1901: 24,159 acres (97.77 km^{2})
  - 1971: 22,306 acres (90.27 km^{2})
- Population
  - 1901: 6,369
  - 1971: 11,192
- History
  - Created: 1894
  - Abolished: 1974
  - Succeeded by: Borough of Rhuddlan
- Status: Rural District
  - HQ: St Asaph

St Asaph Rural District (known as St Asaph (Flint) Rural District until 1934) was a rural district in the administrative county of Flintshire, Wales, from 1894 to 1974.

The district was created by the Local Government Act 1894 from the parts of St Asaph Rural Sanitary District (RSD) in Flintshire. The remainder of the RSD formed St Asaph (Denbigh) Rural District, which was abolished in 1934.

The district comprised nine civil parishes:

- Bodelwyddan
- Bodfari
- Cwm
- Dyserth
- Meliden
- Rhuddlan
- St Asaph
- Tremeirchion
- Waen

The rural district was abolished in 1974 and its area added to the new Borough of Rhuddlan.
