= Pat Leach =

Welsh rugby union footballer

- Full name: Patrick James Handley Leach
- Born: 18 July 1985 (age 41) St Asaph, Denbighshire, Wales
- Height: 1.88 m (6 ft 2 in)
- Weight: 100 kg (15 st 10 lb)
- School: Rydal Penrhos

Rugby union career
- Position: Centre
- Current team: Newport Gwent Dragons
Senior career
Years	Team	Apps	(Points)
?–2003	Colwyn Bay	?	(?)
2003–?	Orrell	?	(?)
2006–2008	Colwyn Bay	?	(?)
2008–2009	Manchester	?	(?)
2009–	Newport RFC	22	(15)
2009–	Newport Gwent Dragons	78	(25)
- Correct as of 03:00, 2 May 2011 (UTC)
International career
Years	Team	Apps	(Points)
2009	England Counties	?	(?)

Patrick James Handley Leach (born 18 July 1985) is a rugby union player for Newport RFC and the Newport Gwent Dragons regional team. He usually plays at centre, but he has also played at fullback. Born in St Asaph, Flintshire, Leach began his career with Colwyn Bay RFC and joined Orrell RUFC after leaving school. He also played for Manchester Rugby Club and had trials with English Premiership side Worcester before joining Newport RFC in 2009. He received his first call-up to the Dragons side in May 2010.

== Early life and cricket career ==
Leach was born in St Asaph to Mike – a former Wales B rugby international – and Sally Leach. He attended Rydal Penrhos senior school in Colwyn Bay, where his father was employed as a rugby coach. While at Rydal, Leach mostly played cricket, and in 2000, at the age of 14, he began playing in the Liverpool and District Cricket Competition for Colwyn Bay, for whom he played until 2009. He briefly went on trial with Glamorgan County Cricket Club in the summer of 2002, playing for their Under-17s team in matches against Monmouth School and Wiltshire Under-17s. Three years later, he was selected to play for the Wales Minor Counties in a Minor Counties Championship match against Shropshire in Colwyn Bay. He bowled 11 overs in the first innings, taking no wickets for 63 runs, but did not bowl in the second innings and did not bat in either innings.

In 2008, Leach was selected to play for Wales in a three-day game against the Marylebone Cricket Club at the SWALEC Stadium. He opened the bowling for Wales, taking two wickets for 29 runs in 12 overs, before scoring 40 runs off 74 balls. In the second innings, he took one more wicket for 25 runs off 11 overs and added 35 runs off 54 ball. The match finished as a draw, with Wales falling 77 runs short of a result with three wickets remaining.

== Rugby career ==
Leach also played rugby union while at Rydal, both for the school and for Colwyn Bay RFC. On leaving school, Leach joined Orrell RUFC, but later returned to Colwyn Bay. He spent two years back with Colwyn Bay before joining Manchester Rugby Club, making it into the first XV. This led to appearances for Cheshire and for the England Counties team's tour of Japan and South Korea in 2009. The same year, Leach had a two-week trial with English Premiership side Worcester Warriors, followed by two weeks with the Newport Gwent Dragons at a training camp in Aberystwyth.

Leach was offered a contract with the Dragons in August 2009, but an ankle injury early in the season meant that he missed much of the 2009–10 campaign. He made his comeback for Newport RFC in a game against Bedwas RFC in January 2010, and went on to make 15 more appearances before the end of the season, leading to his Dragons debut against the Ospreys on 7 May 2010; he was replaced by Tom Riley after 66 minutes.
