= Woodfest Wales =

Annual wood carving event

- Locations: Plas Carreg, Caerwys, Flintshire
- Inaugurated: June 8, 2002

Woodfest Wales (Welsh: Gŵyl Coed Cymru) is an annual wood carving event that was first held on 8–9 June 2002 in St Asaph, and attracted more than 18,000 visitors in 2004. Among the attractions is a chain saw carving competition. Since 2005, due to its increasing popularity, a second event has been held in May at Margam Country Park near Port Talbot in South Wales, and in addition to activities and displays related to wood, such as chain saw carving, logging competitions, and pole climbing, it includes displays of birds of prey, mountain biking, cookery, arts and crafts and a fairground.
