= Morudd ab Aeddan =

Welsh prince, probably of Rhufoniog

Morudd ab Aeddan ap Môr ap Breichiol (or Moreith ap Aidan; fl. c. 520) appears in a genealogy of Welsh princes, probably of Rhufoniog. He was probably the same figure recorded elsewhere as Marut ab Elaeth. His son Môr ap Morudd was the last prince of Rhufoniog.

== Bibliography ==
- Bartrum, P. C. (1993), A Welsh Classical Dictionary: People in History and Legend up to about A.D. 1000 (PDF), National Library of Wales, pp. 491–583
