= List of scheduled monuments in Wrexham County Borough =

Wrexham County Borough is in north-east Wales, straddling the ancient border earthwork Offa's Dyke. There are 107 scheduled monuments in the county borough. The 29 Bronze Age and Iron Age sites are mainly found to the west of Offa's dyke, and are in the main burial mounds and hillforts on the uplands. To the east of the dyke are the majority of the 18 medieval sites, mainly domestic, defensive or ecclesiastical. Running through the centre are the 28 early medieval sites along Offa's Dyke, and 10 scheduled sections of the older Wat's Dyke. Close by, clustered around the coal and mineral deposits in a central belt are also the 19 post-medieval sites. These are extraction and industrial sites, plus the World Heritage Site at Pontcysyllte Aqueduct. The Wrexham administrative area lies within the two historic counties of Denbighshire and Flintshire.

Scheduled monuments have statutory protection. The compilation of the list is undertaken by Cadw Welsh Historic Monuments, which is an executive agency of the National Assembly of Wales. The list of scheduled monuments below is supplied by Cadw with additional material from RCAHMW and Clwyd-Powys Archaeological Trust.

== Scheduled monuments in Wrexham ==
Image	Name	Site type	Community	Location	Details	Historic County	Period	SAM No & Refs
	Two Round Barrows N of Whitewell Church	Round barrow	Bronington	52.9694°N 2.7544°W, SJ494416		Flintshire	Prehistoric	FL058
	Gatewen Hall round barrow	Round barrow	Broughton	53.055°N 3.0205°W, SJ317513		Denbighshire	Prehistoric	DE290
	Cadair Berwyn, round cairn on N ridge of	Round cairn	Ceiriog Ucha, (also Llanrhaeadr-ym-Mochnant), (see also Powys)	52.8923°N 3.3697°W, SJ079336		Denbighshire	Prehistoric	DE297
	Pen-plaenau cairns and standing stone	Round cairn	Ceiriog Ucha	52.9173°N 3.3004°W, SJ126363		Denbighshire	Prehistoric	DE294
	Tomen y Gwyddel Round Barrow	Round barrow	Ceiriog Ucha	52.9107°N 3.228°W, SJ175355	Bronze Age barrow, dug through by treasure seekers in 1854, apparently without finding anything.	Denbighshire	Prehistoric	DE171
	Y Garnedd Wen Round Cairn	Round cairn	Ceiriog Ucha	52.8713°N 3.2866°W, SJ134312		Denbighshire	Prehistoric	DE278
	Croes-Foel Round Barrow	Round barrow	Esclusham	53.0257°N 3.0345°W, SJ307481		Denbighshire	Prehistoric	DE048
	Hadfod-y-Bwlch Round Barrow	Round barrow	Esclusham	53.022°N 3.0322°W, SJ308476		Denbighshire	Prehistoric	DE047
	Graig cairn	Round cairn	Glyntraian	52.9302°N 3.1337°W, SJ238375		Denbighshire	Prehistoric	DE295
	Orseddwen cairn	Round cairn	Glyntraian	52.8983°N 3.1203°W, SJ247340		Denbighshire	Prehistoric	DE292
	Pen-y-Brongyll Round Barrow	Round barrow	Glyntraian	52.9371°N 3.1593°W, SJ221383		Denbighshire	Prehistoric	DE226
	Sutton Green round barrow	Round barrow	Isycoed	53.0305°N 2.8871°W, SJ406485		Denbighshire	Prehistoric	DE291
	Bryn Du cairn	Round cairn	Llansantffraid Glyn Ceiriog	52.916°N 3.2542°W, SJ157361		Denbighshire	Prehistoric	DE293
	Tomen y Meirw	Round barrow	Llansantffraid Glyn Ceiriog	52.934°N 3.2485°W, SJ161381		Denbighshire	Prehistoric	DE102
	Wilderness Round Barrows	Round barrow	Llansantffraid Glyn Ceiriog, (also Llangollen), (also Corwen), (see also Denbighshire)	52.9539°N 3.2298°W, SJ174403		Denbighshire	Prehistoric	DE092
	Bryn Alyn Round Barrow	Round barrow	Llay	53.0802°N 2.9971°W, SJ333541		Denbighshire	Prehistoric	DE059
	Esclusham Mountain Cairn, Minera	Round cairn	Minera	53.0527°N 3.1039°W, SJ261511		Denbighshire	Prehistoric	DE196
	Fairy Oak Round Barrow	Round barrow	Offa	53.0396°N 2.9985°W, SJ331496		Denbighshire	Prehistoric	DE163
	Hillbury Round Barrow	Round barrow	Offa	53.0376°N 2.9943°W, SJ334493		Denbighshire	Prehistoric	DE164
	Cefn y Gader Round Barrows	Round barrow	Penycae, (also Llandegla), (also Minera), (see also Denbighshire)	53.0393°N 3.1384°W, SJ237497		Denbighshire	Prehistoric	DE070
	Eglwyseg Mountain Round Barrow	Round barrow	Penycae, (also Llantysilio), (see also Denbighshire)	53.0086°N 3.147°W, SJ231463		Denbighshire	Prehistoric	DE066
	Penycae Cairn	Round cairn	Penycae	53.0249°N 3.1289°W, SJ243481		Denbighshire	Prehistoric	DE268
	Ruabon Mountain Round Barrow	Round barrow	Penycae	53.0214°N 3.1083°W, SJ257476		Denbighshire	Prehistoric	DE127
	Two Cairns on Ruabon Mountain	Round cairn	Penycae	53.0004°N 3.1421°W, SJ234453		Denbighshire	Prehistoric	DE263
	Darland Wood Round Barrows	Round barrow	Ruabon	52.9727°N 3.0457°W, SJ298422		Denbighshire	Prehistoric	DE223
	Mynydd Bach Camp	Hillfort	Ceiriog Ucha	52.8972°N 3.2621°W, SJ151340		Denbighshire	Prehistoric	DE120
	Pen y Gaer Hillfort	Hillfort	Llangollen Rural	52.9761°N 3.1178°W, SJ250426		Denbighshire	Prehistoric	DE231
	Bryn Alyn Camp	Hillfort	Llay	53.0761°N 2.9993°W, SJ331536		Denbighshire	Prehistoric	DE057
	Gardden Camp	Hillfort	Ruabon	52.9958°N 3.0488°W, SJ297447		Denbighshire	Prehistoric	DE129
	Pen-Plaenau Roman Marching Camp	Marching camp	Ceiriog Ucha	52.9168°N 3.3237°W, SJ110363		Denbighshire	Roman	DE296
	Holt Roman Settlement	Bath-house	Holt	53.0846°N 2.8883°W, SJ405545		Denbighshire	Roman	DE013
	Tomen Garmon	Mound	Ceiriog Ucha	52.8862°N 3.2529°W, SJ157328	Circular mound interpreted as a preaching mound, although a motte or barrow are possibilities. Located near the centre of Dyffryn Ceriog Llanarmon, and named after the local saint Garmon.	Denbighshire	Prehistoric	DE170
	Wat's Dyke: Section extending from Erddig Park to Middle Sontley	Linear earthwork	Esclusham	53.029°N 3.0071°W, SJ325438		Denbighshire	Early Medieval	DE152
	Wat's Dyke: Section extending from Middle Sontley to Black Brook Bridge	Linear earthwork	Esclusham	53.0088°N 3.0115°W, SJ322462		Denbighshire	Early Medieval	DE153
	Wat's Dyke: Section W of Ty-Gwyn	Linear earthwork	Gwersyllt	53.0686°N 2.9967°W, SJ333528		Denbighshire	Early Medieval	DE151
	Wat's Dyke : Section South of Ruthin Road	Linear earthwork	Offa	53.0426°N 3.0048°W, SJ327499		Denbighshire	Early Medieval	DE165
	Wat's Dyke: Section SSW of Wrexham Station, 130m Long	Linear earthwork	Offa	53.049°N 3.0026°W, SJ328506		Denbighshire	Early Medieval	DE191
	Wat's Dyke: Sections N & S of the Court	Linear earthwork	Offa	53.0357°N 3.0034°W, SJ328491		Denbighshire	Early Medieval	DE173
	Wat's Dyke at Crispin Lane, Wrexham	Linear earthwork	Rhosddu	53.0536°N 3.0012°W, SJ329511		Denbighshire	Early Medieval	DE286
	Wat's Dyke: Garden Village Section	Linear earthwork	Rhosddu	53.0637°N 2.9973°W, SJ332522		Denbighshire	Early Medieval	DE221
	Wat's Dyke: Section extending from Black Brook Bridge to Pentre-Clawdd	Linear earthwork	Ruabon	52.9988°N 3.0176°W, SJ318450		Denbighshire	Early Medieval	DE154
	Wat's Dyke: Section extending from Pentre-Clawdd to Wynnstay Park	Linear earthwork	Ruabon	52.988°N 3.0283°W, SJ310439		Denbighshire	Early Medieval	DE155
	Offa's Dyke: Mountain View Section	Linear earthwork	Brymbo	53.0807°N 3.0628°W, SJ289542		Denbighshire	Early Medieval	DE222
	Offa's Dyke: Brymbo Hill Section	Linear earthwork	Brymbo	53.078°N 3.0619°W, SJ289539		Denbighshire	Early Medieval	DE109
	Offa's Dyke: Section S from Cae Llewellyn	Linear earthwork	Brymbo	53.0661°N 3.0588°W, SJ291526		Denbighshire	Early Medieval	DE110
	Offa's Dyke: Section S from Pen y Coed	Linear earthwork	Brymbo	53.0826°N 3.0636°W, SJ288544		Denbighshire	Early Medieval	DE112
	Offa's Dyke: Section South of Brymbo Colliery	Linear earthwork	Brymbo	53.072°N 3.06°W, SJ290532		Denbighshire	Early Medieval	DE185
	Offa's Dyke: Vron Farm Section	Linear earthwork	Brymbo	53.0599°N 3.0579°W, SJ291519		Denbighshire	Early Medieval	DE113
	Offa's Dyke: Vron Section	Linear earthwork	Brymbo	53.0641°N 3.0586°W, SJ291523		Denbighshire	Early Medieval	DE184
	Offa's Dyke: Caeau-Gwynion Section	Linear earthwork	Chirk	52.9489°N 3.082°W, SJ273396		Denbighshire	Early Medieval	DE133
	Offa's Dyke: Chirk Castle Section extending NE from Castle Mill	Linear earthwork	Chirk	52.9341°N 3.0932°W, SJ266379		Denbighshire	Early Medieval	DE134
	Offa's Dyke: Chirk Park Section extending 340m NE of Home Farm	Linear earthwork	Chirk	52.9386°N 3.09°W, SJ268384		Denbighshire	Early Medieval	DE198
	Offa's Dyke: Chirk Park Section extending NE from the Lake	Linear earthwork	Chirk	52.9439°N 3.0867°W, SJ270390		Denbighshire	Early Medieval	DE135
	Offa's Dyke: Section N & S of Plas-Offa	Linear earthwork	Chirk	52.9591°N 3.0698°W, SJ282407		Denbighshire	Early Medieval	DE138
	Offa's Dyke: Section N & S of Tan-y-Cut	Linear earthwork	Chirk	52.9615°N 3.0686°W, SJ283409		Denbighshire	Early Medieval	DE140
	Offa's Dyke Section South of River Gwenfro	Linear earthwork	Coedpoeth	53.0575°N 3.0573°W, SJ292516		Denbighshire	Early Medieval	DE183
	Offa's Dyke: North Section at Coedpoeth	Linear earthwork	Coedpoeth	53.0549°N 3.0566°W, SJ292513		Denbighshire	Early Medieval	DE182
	Offa's Dyke: Plas Power Section	Linear earthwork	Coedpoeth	53.0404°N 3.0503°W, SJ296497		Denbighshire	Early Medieval	DE139
	Offa's Dyke: Section in Plas Power Park	Linear earthwork	Coedpoeth	53.0455°N 3.0538°W, SJ294503		Denbighshire	Early Medieval	DE180
	Offa's Dyke: South Section at Coedpoeth	Linear earthwork	Coedpoeth	53.0519°N 3.0563°W, SJ292510		Denbighshire	Early Medieval	DE181
	Offa's Dyke: Cadwgan Hall Section, extending from River Clywedog to the Railway	Linear earthwork	Esclusham	53.0332°N 3.0483°W, SJ297489		Denbighshire	Early Medieval	DE132
	Offa's Dyke: Pentre-Bychan Hall Section, extending 540m S from Bron-Wylfa	Linear earthwork	Esclusham	53.0249°N 3.0462°W, SJ299480		Denbighshire	Early Medieval	DE137
	Offa's Dyke: Section extending 120m from Railway to Bronwylfa Road, Legacy	Linear earthwork	Esclusham	53.0277°N 3.0471°W, SJ298483		Denbighshire	Early Medieval	DE194
	Offa's Dyke: Section S of Bryn yr Owen Farm	Linear earthwork	Esclusham	53.0207°N 3.0453°W, SJ299475		Denbighshire	Early Medieval	DE174
	Offa's Dyke: Sections N & S of Bryn yr Owen Colliery	Linear earthwork	Esclusham	53.0188°N 3.0452°W, SJ299473		Denbighshire	Early Medieval	DE179
	Offa's Dyke: Section from Footpath S of Pen-y-Bryn to Orseddwen	Linear earthwork	Glyntraian	52.9121°N 3.1127°W, SJ252355		Denbighshire	Early Medieval	DE136
	Offa's Dyke: Section S of Aberderfyn Road	Linear earthwork	Rhosllanerchrugog	53.0126°N 3.0436°W, SJ300466		Denbighshire	Early Medieval	DE178
	Offa's Dyke: Section N of Home Farm	Linear earthwork	Ruabon	52.9805°N 3.0529°W, SJ294430		Denbighshire	Early Medieval	DE177
	Offa's Dyke: Section SW from Tatham Bridge	Linear earthwork	Ruabon	52.9887°N 3.0494°W, SJ296440		Denbighshire	Early Medieval	DE141
	Offa's Dyke: Y Gardden Camp Section	Linear earthwork	Ruabon	52.9939°N 3.0448°W, SJ299445		Denbighshire	Early Medieval	DE142
	Bangor Bridge	Bridge	Bangor Is-y-coed	53.0028°N 2.9136°W, SJ387454		Flintshire	Medieval	FL017
	Haulton Ring Moated Site	Moated Site	Bronington	52.9304°N 2.7918°W, SJ468372		Flintshire	Medieval	FL100
	Mount Cop Castle Mound	Motte	Bronington	52.9634°N 2.79°W, SJ470409		Flintshire	Medieval	FL099
	Wolvesacre Hall Moated Site	Moated Site	Bronington	52.9769°N 2.7363°W, SJ506424		Flintshire	Medieval	FL178
	Castell y Waun Castle Mound	Motte	Chirk	52.9308°N 3.0558°W, SJ291375		Denbighshire	Medieval	DE117
	Cadwgan Hall Mound	Motte	Esclusham	53.0316°N 3.0475°W, SJ298487		Denbighshire	Medieval	DE131
	Moated Site near Groesfoel Farm, Rhostyllen	Moated Site	Esclusham	53.0266°N 3.039°W, SJ304482		Denbighshire	Medieval	DE193
	Halghton Lodge Moated Site	Moated Site	Hanmer	52.9834°N 2.868°W, SJ418432		Flintshire	Medieval	FL174
	Hanmer Churchyard Cross	Cross	Hanmer	52.9523°N 2.813°W, SJ455397		Flintshire	Medieval	FL098
	Hanmer Moated Site	Moated Site	Hanmer	52.9529°N 2.8081°W, SJ458398		Flintshire	Medieval	FL184
	Pear Tree Lane Moat & Fishpond	Moated Site	Hanmer	52.9695°N 2.8396°W, SJ437416		Flintshire	Medieval	FL175
	Fishponds at Esp Hill	Fishpond	Holt	53.0786°N 2.8903°W, SJ404538		Denbighshire	Medieval	DE224
	Holt Bridge	Bridge	Holt	53.0834°N 2.88°W, SJ411543		Denbighshire	Medieval	DE024
Remains of Holt Castle inner courtyard	Holt Castle	Castle	Holt	53.0779°N 2.8802°W, SJ411537		Denbighshire	Medieval	DE106
	Penley Hall Moated Site	Moated Site	Maelor South	52.9584°N 2.8695°W, SJ416404		Flintshire	Medieval	FL097
	Erddig Mound & Bailey Castle	Motte & Bailey	Marchwiel	53.0307°N 3.0045°W, SJ327486		Denbighshire	Medieval	DE017
	Lightwood Farm Moated Site	Moated Site	Overton-on-Dee	52.9629°N 2.9112°W, SJ388410		Flintshire	Medieval	FL095
	Tallarn Green Moated Site	Moated Site	Willington Worthenbury	52.9899°N 2.8255°W, SJ446439		Flintshire	Medieval	FL177
	Peat Processing Works, Fenn's Moss	Industrial building	Bronington	52.9248°N 2.7778°W, SJ478366		Flintshire	Post-Medieval/Modern	FL182
Brymbo Steelworks Heritage Site	Brymbo Ironworks: Early Blast Furnace, Cast House & Foundry	Industrial monument	Brymbo	53.0742°N 3.0544°W, SJ294535	Established by John Wilkinson, these iron and steel works operated between 1796 and 1990. An original blast furnace stack remains on the site.	Denbighshire	Post-Medieval/Modern	DE202
	Brymbo Lead Smelting Works	Industrial monument	Brymbo	53.0774°N 3.0692°W, SJ284538		Denbighshire	Post-Medieval/Modern	DE233
Penrhos Engine House	Penrhos Engine House	Engine house	Brymbo	53.0715°N 3.0675°W, SJ285532		Denbighshire	Post-Medieval/Modern	DE203
Narrow boat crossing the Pontcysyllte aqueduct	Pontcysyllte Aqueduct and Canal	Aqueduct	Chirk, (also Llangollen Rural), (also Llangollen), (see also Denbighshire)	52.9702°N 3.0878°W, SJ270419	Built in 1805, by Thomas Telford, this is the longest and highest aqueduct in Britain. It carries the Llangollen Canal over the River Dee.	Denbighshire	Post-Medieval/Modern	DE175
	The Holyhead Road: the Chirk Embankment and earlier trackways	Road	Chirk	52.9301°N 3.0577°W, SJ289374		Denbighshire	Post-Medieval/Modern	DE288
Bersham Colliery Engine House and Winding Gear	Bersham Colliery: No 2 Winding Gear	Industrial monument	Esclusham	53.0264°N 3.0234°W, SJ314481	One of 38 former coalmines in the Wrexham area, Bersham was productive from 1874 to 1976	Denbighshire	Post-Medieval/Modern	DE199
Bersham Ironworks	Bersham Ironworks	Ironworks	Esclusham	53.0363°N 3.0346°W, SJ307493	Ironworks of John Wilkinson, pioneering smooth-bored iron cannons. It now incorporates a museum.	Denbighshire	Post-Medieval/Modern	DE189
	Pont y Cysylltau	Bridge	Llangollen Rural	52.9707°N 3.0913°W, SJ268420		Denbighshire	Post-Medieval/Modern	DE027
	Bank of Six Vertical Limekilns at Minera Quarry	Limekiln	Minera	53.0592°N 3.1086°W, SJ258519	Built in 1852, there are 6 kilns, rising to 15m	Denbighshire	Post-Medieval/Modern	DE236
Buddle at Minera Lead Mine	Meadow Shaft, Minera	Lead mine	Minera	53.0507°N 3.0826°W, SJ275509	These shafts had two periods of lead extraction, in the 18th and the mid-19th centuries. A restored pumping engine house, boiler house and chimney, winder engine house, rock crusher house, restored ore house and buddles are all part of the Minera Lead Mines Country Park.	Denbighshire	Post-Medieval/Modern	DE244
	Minera Halvans Plant	Industrial monument	Minera	53.0554°N 3.0891°W, SJ271514	Built by Taylors mining company from 1872, this site within the Lead Mines complex, extracted lead ore from existingheaps of low grade waste ('halvans'). The plant included a beam engine, Cornish crushers, boiler house and six buddles.	Denbighshire	Post-Medieval/Modern	DE242
Hoffman Kiln archway at Minera	Minera Hoffman Limekiln	Limekiln	Minera	53.0598°N 3.1111°W, SJ256519	Earliest Hoffman type limekiln in the world. An oval tunnel with 24 archways allowed burning to progress continuously round the kiln, built in 1868	Denbighshire	Post-Medieval/Modern	DE235
	Nant Mill Wood Shaft Mounds	Shaft Mounds	Minera	53.0472°N 3.0739°W, SJ281505	Early bell pit coalmine shafts, south of the Minera lead mines	Denbighshire	Post-Medieval/Modern	DE237
	New Minera Lead Mine	Lead mine	Minera	53.0502°N 3.0776°W, SJ278508	Located lower down the valley side than the older Minera lead mines, this site was worked from 1889 until the early 20th century. Now partially excavated, it has remains of various innovative items of machinery.	Denbighshire	Post-Medieval/Modern	DE241
Remains of Lead mining, near Minera	Taylor's Shaft, Minera	Lead mine	Minera	53.0535°N 3.0903°W, SJ270512	Main lead mine shaft when Minera mines were re-opened in 1849. It was excavated in 1993-4 and includes winding house, chimney and boiler house bases	Denbighshire	Post-Medieval/Modern	DE243
Church Gates, St Giles Parish Church, Wrexham	Wrexham Churchyard Ornamental Wrought Iron Gates and Screen	Gate	Offa	53.0446°N 2.993°W, SJ335501		Denbighshire	Post-Medieval/Modern	DE158
	Wynnstay Colliery Walker Fan House	Industrial monument	Ruabon	52.9826°N 3.054°W, SJ293433		Denbighshire	Post-Medieval/Modern	DE238
	Wynnstay Colliery Winding Engine House	Engine house	Ruabon	52.9822°N 3.0534°W, SJ293432		Denbighshire	Post-Medieval/Modern	DE190

Scheduled monuments in Wrexham, Wales.
=Prehistoric =Roman =Early Medieval
=Medieval =Post-Medieval/Modern

== See also ==
- List of Cadw properties
- List of castles in Wales
- List of hill forts in Wales
- Historic houses in Wales
- List of monastic houses in Wales
- List of museums in Wales
- List of Roman villas in Wales
