= Maen Huail =

Stone block in Ruthin, Wales

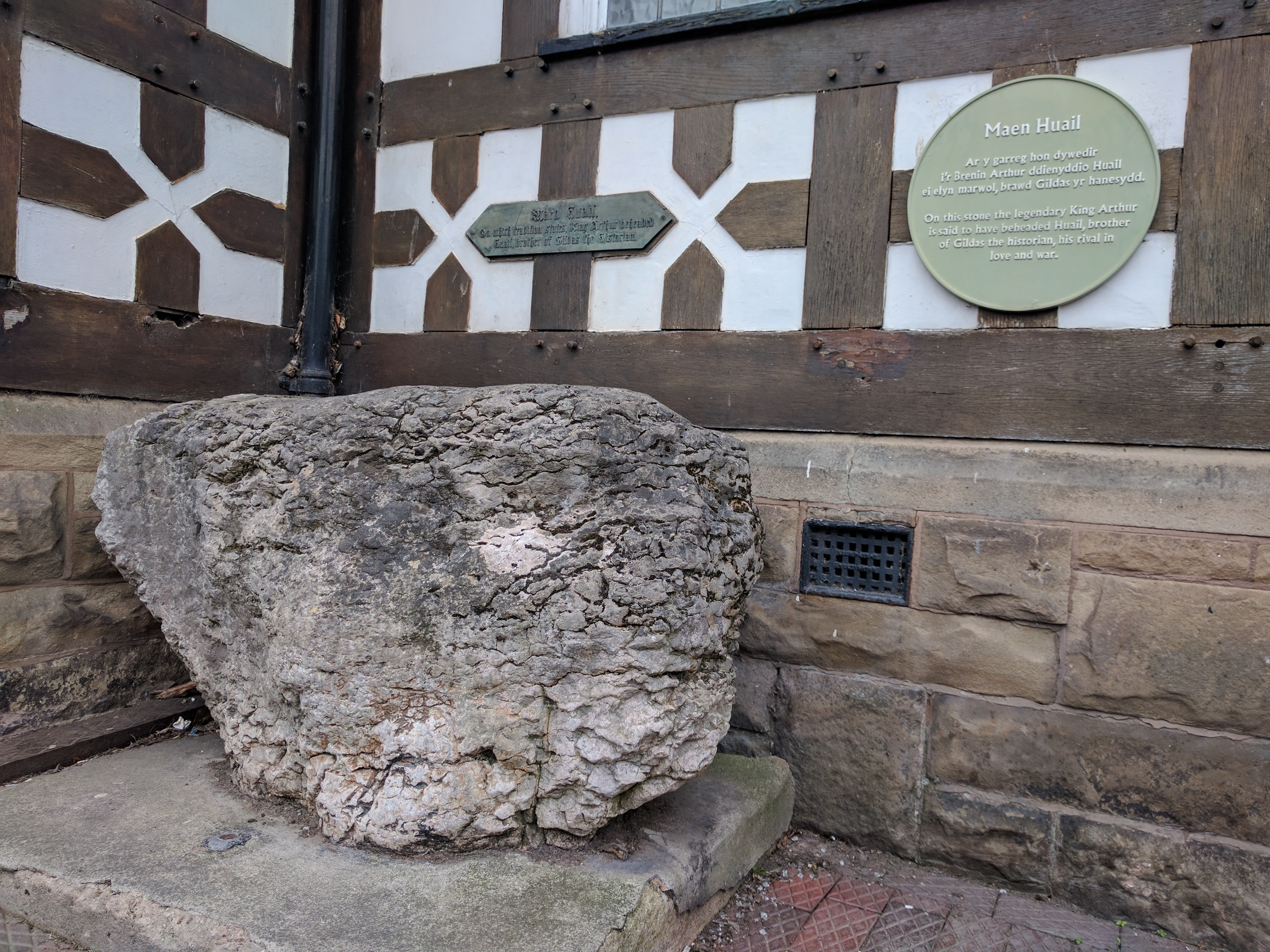
- The stone stands against the wall of Exmewe Hall, facing the roundabout.

- Location within Denbighshire
- 53.1144°N 3.3108°W
- Type: historic stone
- Periods: post-medieval or older
- Location: Centre of Ruthin. (OS Grid ref SJ123582)
- Region: North Wales

Site notes
- Condition: Good
- Public access: Yes

Scheduled monument
- Reference no.: DE030

Maen Huail is a stone block at St Peter's Square, in the centre of Ruthin, Denbighshire, North Wales. A circular plaque next to it states "Maen Huail on which tradition states, King Arthur beheaded Huail, brother of Gildas the historian". The stone was recorded in 1699 as being in the middle of the road, and now stands on a concrete plinth against the half-timbered wall of the Barclays Bank building, a 20th-century copy of the now mainly destroyed Exmewe Hall.

The legend probably originated as an oral tradition, and is first recorded in the Chronicle of Six Ages of the World by Elis Gruffydd, dating to around 1550. The stone itself is thought more likely to be a market or civic stone, or a preaching stone. It is a craggy and heavily weathered limestone boulder, measuring 1.2 metres (3.9 ft) long, and some 0.6 metres (2.0 ft) high and wide.

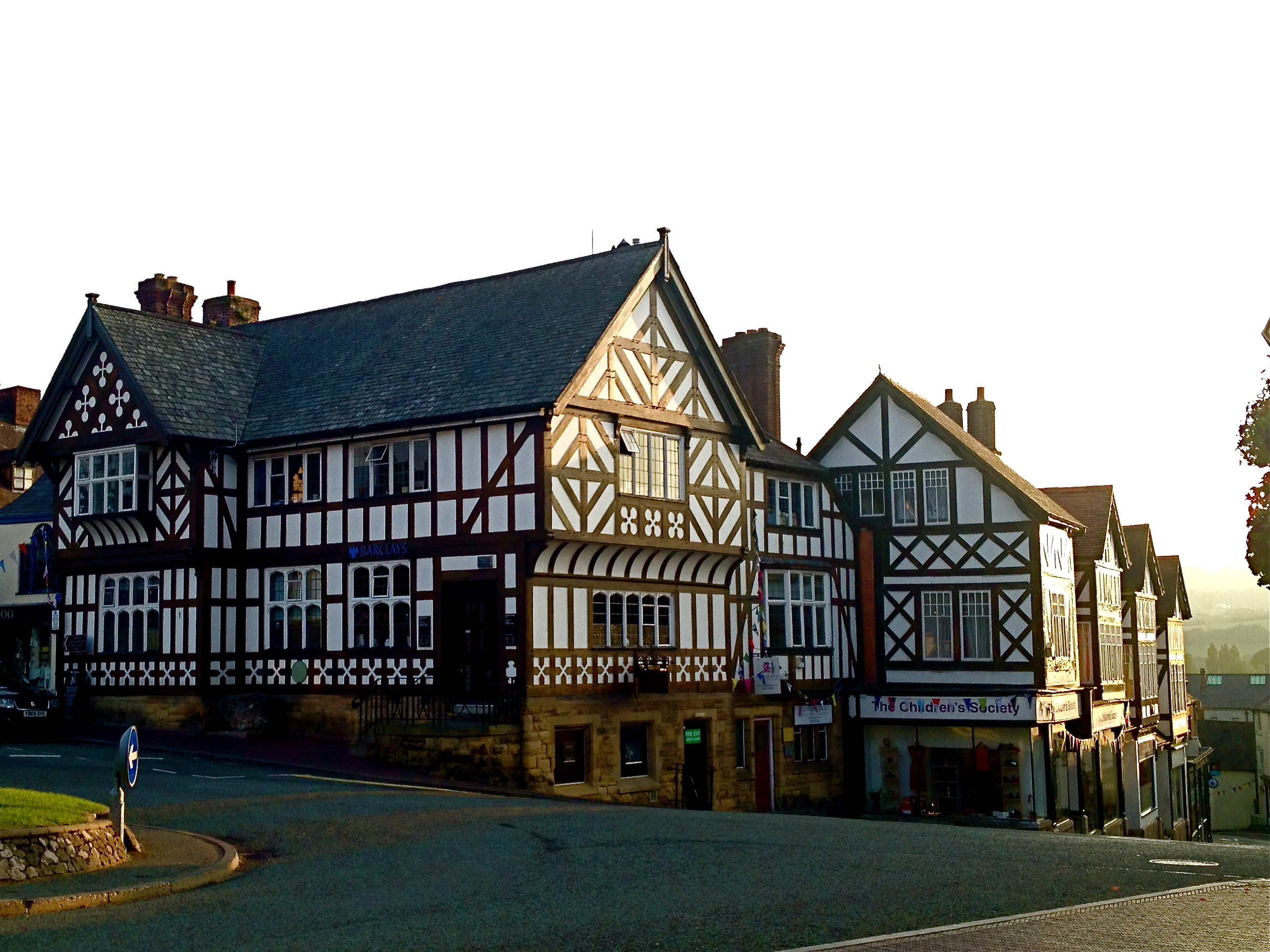
The re-built Exmewe Hall, on St. Peter's Square, Ruthin.

== See also ==
- List of individual rocks
- List of Scheduled Monuments in Denbighshire
