= Ffynnon Beuno and Cae Gwyn Caves =

Protected caves in Denbighshire, Wales

Coordinates: 53.241°N 3.3719°W

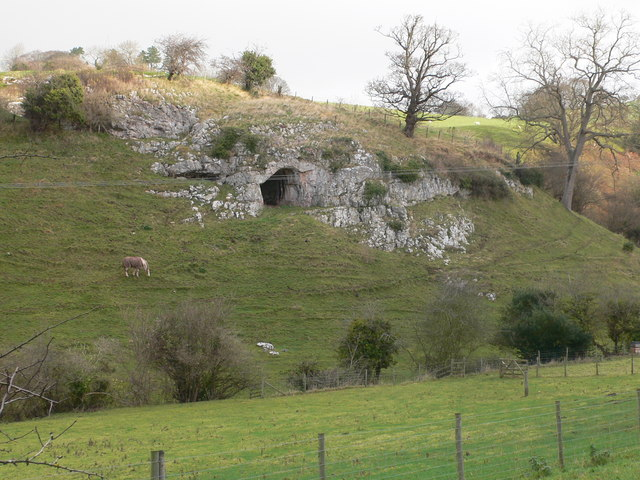
Ffynnon Beuno Cave

Ffynnon Beuno and Cae Gwyn Caves are two scheduled monuments, in Denbighshire, Wales, which are also designated a Site of Special Scientific Interest (SSSI).

The site has two caves, with entrances close to each other high on a valley side, above the Vale of Clwyd. They were first excavated in 1883–5. Human tools have been found on the site dating back to around 36,000 BC, and a mammoth bone has been dated back to 16,000 BC. These very early discoveries were significant in providing one of the first direct associations between stone tools of Paleolithic people and the bones of extinct pre-ice age animals such as mammoth and woolly rhinoceros.

In 1963 it was designated as an SSSI for the Palaeontological interest described above and for its species interest as a winter roost of lesser horseshoe bat.

== See also ==
- Cefn Caves (7 km west of this site)
- List of Sites of Special Scientific Interest in Denbighshire
- List of Scheduled Monuments in Denbighshire
