= Rhufoniog =

Welsh medieval sub-kingdom and cantref

Coordinates: 52.950°N 3.275°W

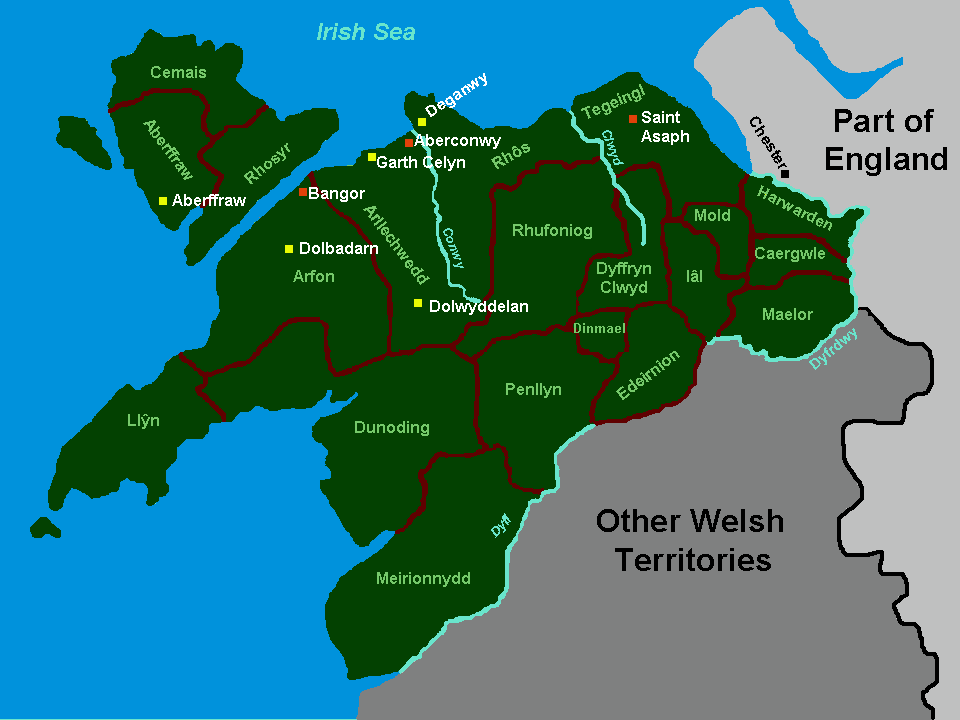
A general map of Gwynedd showing the cantrefi. Rhufoniog is shown in the upper centre portion.

Rhufoniog was a small sub-kingdom of the Dark Ages Gwynedd, and later a cantref in medieval Wales.

== Geography ==
The cantref Rhos lay between it and the Irish Sea. Sometimes the two cantrefi were linked together as "Rhos and Rhufeiniog", which roughly corresponds to the territory of the old county of Denbighshire. The rivers Elwy, Clwyd and Clywedog formed a natural border to the north and east. As today, the countryside was bleak and isolated.

There were three commotes in Rhufoniog, namely Upper Aled, Lower Aled and River Aled as a border between them, and the commote Ceinmerch (also known as 'Cymeirch' or 'Ystrad') in the north-east between the River Lliwen and the River Clywedog.

== History ==
The early history of the cantref is unclear. According to tradition, it was ruled by its eponymous founder Rhufon, the third son of the first King of Gwynedd, Cunedda, and his direct descendants from the year 445 until the year 540 when it was probably absorbed back into direct control of Gwynedd proper.

It formed part of the territory of the Deceangli during the Roman occupation of Wales. Later, much of the land belonged to the bishops of Bangor and Llanelwy. By the Middle Ages, Denbigh was its capital. The cantref was given to the prince Dafydd ap Gruffudd in 1277, then on his death five years later, it was given to Henry de Lacy, 3rd Earl of Lincoln. It was merged with the cantref Rhos to form the Lordship of Denbigh.

Today most of the area now lies in Denbighshire, with the western parts in Conwy.

== See also ==
- Morudd ab Aeddan
- Perfeddwlad
