= Dinmael =

Welsh medieval lordship and commote

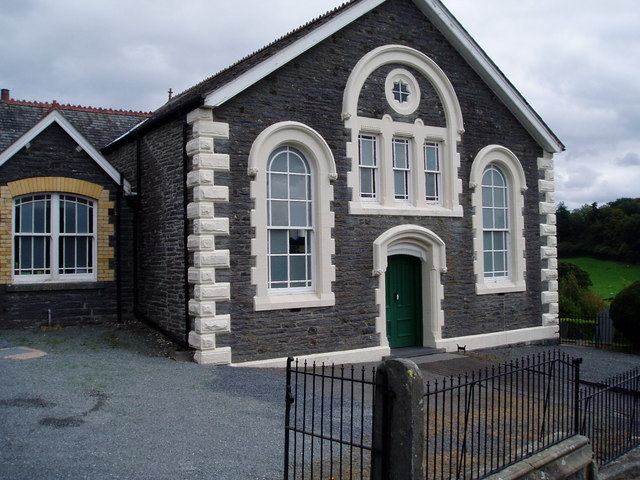
- Dinmael Chapel
- Country: Wales
- Sovereign state: United Kingdom
- Postcode district: LL
- Ambulance: Welsh

Dinmael was a medieval lordship and cwmwd in north Wales which usually formed a part of the patrimony of the kingdom of Powys. The name, of Old Welsh origin, means "the King's Fort" (Din "fort" + Mael "king") and probably refers to a now forgotten early Welsh fortress.

The name survives in the name of a village in the modern county of Conwy; however the modern village is much smaller than the medieval lordship.

Ysgol Dinmael was the village's primary school until its closure in 2009. Previous students included Hugh Evans (writer), who went on to establish a publishing business, publishing over 300 Welsh books.
