= Cefn Meiriadog =

Community in Denbighshire, Wales

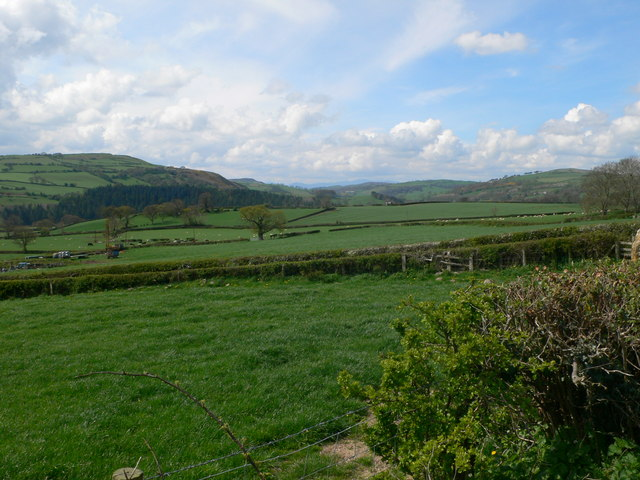
- Fields in the Elwy Valley above Cefn Meiriadog

- Location within Denbighshire
- Population: 389 (2011)
- OS grid reference: SJ007725
  - Cardiff: 122.3 mi (196.8 km)
  - London: 185.6 mi (298.7 km)
- Community: Cefnmeiriadog
- Principal area: Denbighshire
- Preserved county: Clwyd
- Country: Wales
- Sovereign state: United Kingdom
- Post town: ST. ASAPH
- Postcode district: LL17
- Post town: ABERGELE
- Postcode district: LL22
- Dialling code: 01745
- Police: North Wales
- Fire: North Wales
- Ambulance: Welsh
- UK Parliament: Clwyd North
- Senedd Cymru – Welsh Parliament: Vale of Clwyd
- List of places UK Wales Denbighshire 53.240°N 3.488°W Map of the community

Cefn Meiriadog (sometimes Cefnmeriadog) is a rural community in Denbighshire, Wales, just south-west of the city of St Asaph. The boundary of the community on three sides is the river Elwy, which here forms the county boundary with Conwy County Borough. Arguably the largest settlement in the community is the hamlet of Bontnewydd. Also in the community are the hamlets of Groesffordd Marli where Ysgol Cefn Meiriadog is situated, and Cefn.

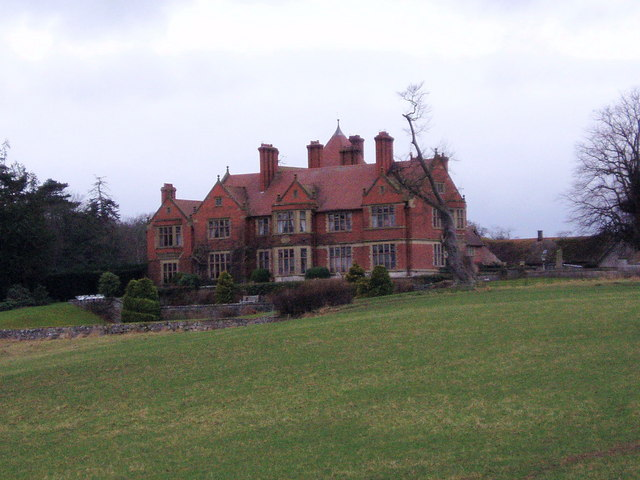
Wigfair, in the parish of Cefn Meiriadog

The community is named for a small ridge of the same name (cefn in Welsh means "ridge"). It is said that the place was named for St Meiriadog, a 4th or 5th century Breton saint. Cefn Caves are nearby, where human and early Neanderthal remains dating back 250,000 years have been discovered. Visitors to the site have included Charles Darwin, in 1831. The site is known as Bontnewydd Palaeolithic site.

There is a local spring, Ffynnon Fair ("St Mary's spring"), and it was once believed to have healing properties. The poet Siôn Tudur (1522 – 1602) lived at Plas Wigfair (GR028712) nearby.

== St Mary's Church, Cefn ==
About 300 metres SE of the fort Bryn y Cawr ("Giant's Hill", at the SE end of the ridge) stands the small St Mary's church (Grade II listed). The stone was quarried at the site of the church; the church was opened and consecrated on 3.9.1864 by Bishop Short of St Asaph, and the new ecclesiastical parish of "Cefn" was created on 7. 2. 1865, made up of two "townships": Wigfair and Meiriadog (both in Denbighshire), previously part of St Asaph parish.

== Population ==
In 2011 the population of Cefnmeiriadog was 389, with 30.4% able to speak Welsh.
