= St Asaph =

Cathedral city and community in Wales

St Asaph: Welsh: Llanelwy
- City and Community
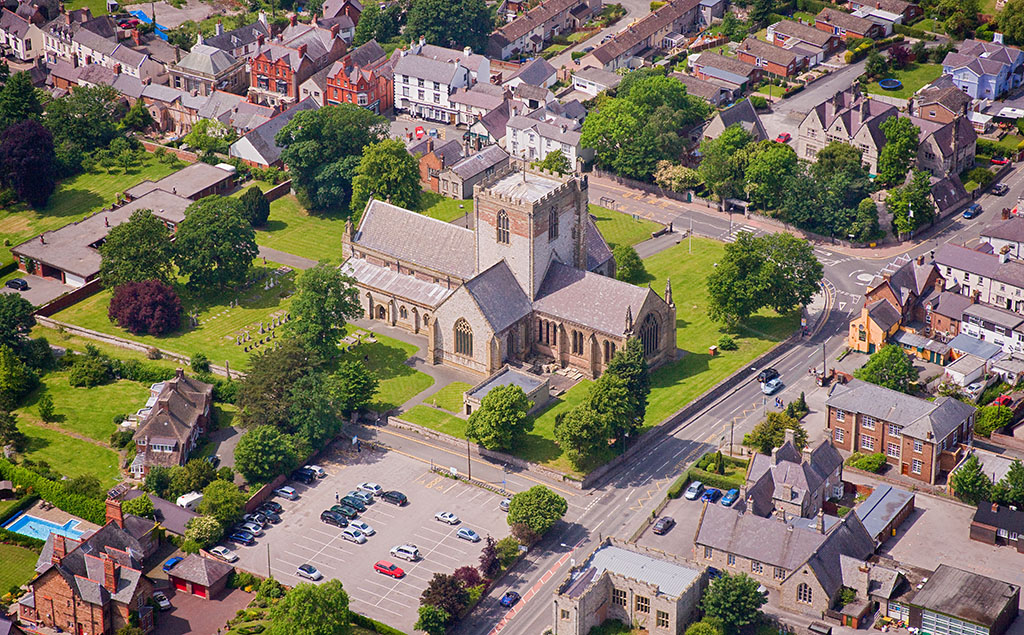
- St. Asaph Cathedral and city

- Flag

- Location within Denbighshire
- Population: 3,485 (Community, 2021)
- OS grid reference: SJ035743
- Community: St Asaph
- Principal area: Denbighshire
- Preserved county: Clwyd
- Country: Wales
- Sovereign state: United Kingdom
- Post town: ST. ASAPH
- Postcode district: LL17
- Dialling code: 01745
- Police: North Wales
- Fire: North Wales
- Ambulance: Welsh
- UK Parliament: Clwyd North
- Senedd Cymru – Welsh Parliament: Clwyd
- List of places UK Wales Denbighshire 53.258°N 3.442°W Map of the community

St Asaph (/ˈæsəf/; Welsh: Llanelwy [ɬanˈɛlʊɨ̯] "church on the Elwy") is a cathedral city and community on the River Elwy in Denbighshire, Wales. At the 2021 census the community had a population of 3,485, making it the second-smallest city in the United Kingdom in terms of population. It was historically in Flintshire.

The city of St Asaph is surrounded by countryside and views of the Vale of Clwyd. It is situated close to a number of towns including Denbigh, Rhuddlan, Rhyl, Holywell and Abergele.

== History ==
The earliest inhabitants of the vale of Elwy lived at the nearby Paleolithic site of Pontnewydd (Bontnewydd), which was excavated from 1978 by a team from the University of Wales, led by Stephen Aldhouse Green. Teeth and part of a jawbone excavated in 1981 were dated to 225,000 years ago. This site is the most north-western site in Eurasia for remains of early hominids and is considered of international importance. Based on the morphology and age of the teeth, particularly the evidence of taurodontism, the teeth are believed to belong to a group of Neanderthals who hunted game in the vale of Elwy in an interglacial period.

Later some historians postulate that the Roman fort of Varae sat on the site of the cathedral. However, the city is believed to have developed around a sixth-century Celtic monastery founded by Saint Kentigern, and is now home to the small 14th century St Asaph Cathedral. This is dedicated to Saint Asaph (also spelt in Welsh as Asaff), its second bishop.

The cathedral has had a chequered history. In the 13th century, the troops of Edward I of England burnt the cathedral almost to the ground, and in 1402 Owain Glyndŵr's troops went on the rampage, causing severe damage to the furnishings and fittings. Two hundred and fifty years later, during the Commonwealth, the building was used to house farm animals: pigs, cattle and horses.

== City status ==
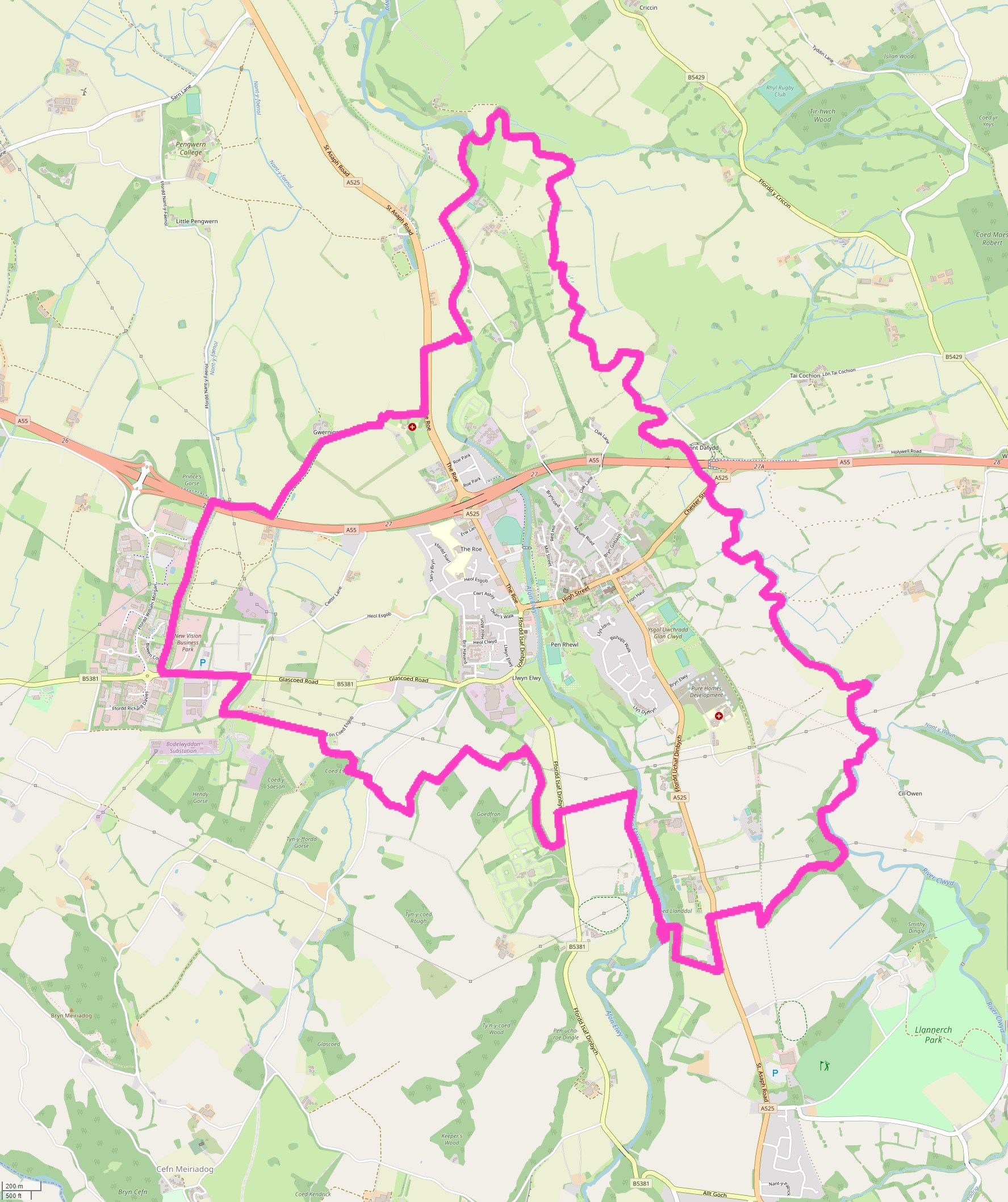
St Asaph showing city/community boundary City border Forestry Countryside Urban area

A video of St Asaph Flood Scheme, by Natural Resources Wales

As the seat of a medieval cathedral and diocese, St Asaph was historically regarded as a city, and the 1911 Encyclopædia Britannica refers to it as a city on that basis; however the UK government clarified that St Asaph was previously the only one of the twenty two ancient cathedral dioceses in England and Wales (pre-Reformation) not to have been awarded city status. The town applied for the status in competitions held by the British government in 2000 (for the Millennium) and 2002 (Queen's Golden Jubilee) but was unsuccessful. In 2012 it again competed for city status during the Queen's Diamond Jubilee celebrations. It was announced on 14 March 2012 that the application was successful, and city status was to be bestowed upon St Asaph alongside Chelmsford and Perth. The status was formally granted by letters patent dated 1 June 2012.

The award of city status is typically granted to a local authority, whose administrative area is then considered to be the formal borders of the city. By this definition, the whole community area of St Asaph is considered to be the extent of the city, including its urban and rural areas. St Asaph contains the second lowest population of all the cities of the UK, and has the second smallest urban area of 0.5 sq mi (1.3 km^{2}), both measures behind St Davids which has 1,841 residents and covers 0.23 sq mi (0.60 km^{2}). However, with the formal city sizing defined by its community council area of 2.49 sq mi (6.4 km^{2}), two other UK cities are smaller than St Asaph by boundary: the City of London smallest at 1.12 sq mi (2.9 km^{2}) and Wells second with 2.11 sq mi (5.5 km^{2}). In Wales, St Asaph is the smallest by council area, with Bangor a close second at 2.79 sq mi (7.2 km^{2}).

== Community ==
Despite the previous lack of official city status, the community council had referred to itself as the City of St Asaph Town Council. The local community is passionate about St Asaph's historic claim to be known as a city like its Welsh cousin St Davids, which has led to a number of local businesses using 'City' as part of their business name. The city is promoted locally as the "City of Music".

The past few decades have seen the local economy in St Asaph thrive, first with the opening of the A55 road in 1970, which took east–west traffic away from the city, and, more recently, with a business park being built, attracting investment from home and overseas.

The crowded roads in St Asaph have been a hot political issue for many years. In recent years, increasing volumes of traffic on the A525, St Asaph High Street, which links A55 with the Clwyd Valley, Denbigh and Ruthin, have led to severe congestion in the city. This congestion is having a detrimental effect on the city, and residents have repeatedly called for a bypass to take this north–south road and its traffic away from the city, but the National Assembly for Wales rejected these calls in 2004, presenting a further setback for residents campaigning on the issue.

St Asaph is now home to Ysgol Glan Clwyd, a Welsh medium secondary school that opened in Rhyl in 1956 and moved to St Asaph in 1969. It was the first Welsh medium secondary school in Wales.

An original copy of the Welsh Bible is kept on public display in St Asaph Cathedral. It was used at the investiture of Prince Charles as Prince of Wales in 1969.

== Twinning ==
St Asaph is twinned with the town of Bégard in Brittany, France.

== Festivities ==
Every year the city hosts the North Wales International Music Festival, which takes place at several venues in the city and attracts musicians and music lovers from all over Wales and beyond. In past years, the main event in September at the cathedral has been covered on television by the BBC.

Other annual events in the city include the increasingly popular Woodfest Wales crafts festival in June, the Beat the Bounds charity walk in July and the Gala Day in August.

== Churches ==
In addition to the cathedral, there are five other churches in St Asaph covering all the major Christian denominations. The Parish Church of St Asaph and St Kentigern (Church in Wales) is placed prominently at the bottom of the High Street, across the river in Lower Denbigh Road is Penniel Chapel (Welsh Methodist) and halfway up the High Street there is Llanelwy Community Church (Baptist). At the top of the city, in Chester Street is St Winifride's (Roman Catholic) and Bethlehem Chapel (Welsh Presbyterian) in Bronwylfa Square.

== Governance ==
There are two tiers of local government covering St Asaph, at community (city) and county level: St Asaph City Council (Cyngor Dinas Llanelwy) and Denbighshire County Council (Cyngor Sir Ddinbych). The city council meets at Roe Plas.

=== Administrative history ===
St Asaph was an ancient parish. It appears to have historically been on the borders of the commote of Rhuddlan in the cantref of Tegeingl, and the commote of Isdulas in the cantref of Rhufoniog. Under the Statute of Rhuddlan in 1284, Tegeingl became part of the new county of Flintshire and Rhufoniog became part of the marcher lordship of Denbighland. The Statute of Rhuddlan does not specifically name St Asaph, and there is some ambiguity as to whether it was in Flintshire or Denbighland; it may have been administered as a separate liberty.

In 1536, the new county of Denbighshire was created under the Laws in Wales Act 1535, comprising the old lordship of Denbighland plus other "lordships, townships, parishes, commotes and cantreds", one of which was "Saint Tasse", being St Asaph. Six years later, in 1542, St Asaph was transferred instead to Flintshire, with the act of parliament which transferred it noting that it had "...of old time been reputed accepted and taken as part and parcel of the county of Flint...".

The parish of St Asaph covered a large rural area as well as the settlement itself, and straddled the hundred of Isdulas in Denbighshire and the hundred of Rhuddlan in Flintshire. It was subdivided into 13 townships:

- Bodelwyddan
- Bodeugan
- Brynpolyn
- Cilowen
- Cyrchynan
- Faenol
- Gwernglefryd
- Gwernigron
- Meriadog
- Pengwern
- Rhyllon
- Talar
- Wigfair

Meriadog and Wigfair were in Denbighshire, the rest of the parish was in Flintshire. The cathedral, the parish church of St Kentigern, and the core of the urban area were in the Brynpolyn township. An ecclesiastical parish of Bodelwyddan was created in 1860 covering the Bodelwyddan, Pengwern and Faenol townships, but it remained part of the civil parish of St Asaph. Another ecclesiastical parish, called Cefn, was created in 1865 covering the two Denbighshire townships of the civil parish.

The Local Government Act 1894 directed that civil parishes could no longer straddle county boundaries. The two Denbighshire townships of Meriadog and Wigfair were therefore together made a new civil parish called Cefn in 1895. The following year, the reduced parish of St Asaph within Flintshire ceded an area to Rhuddlan, and the remainder was split into three civil parishes: Bodelwyddan, Waen and a much reduced St Asaph parish.

St Asaph was then administered as a rural parish with a parish council within the St Asaph Rural District of Flintshire until 1974. In that year, the parish of St Asaph was converted into a community in the new borough of Rhuddlan and county of Clwyd. The upper tiers of local government were reorganised again in 1996, when St Asaph was included in the modern Denbighshire.

== Transport ==
St Asaph is served by regular buses to Denbigh, Rhuddlan and Rhyl, with every other bus to Denbigh continuing to Ruthin and Wrexham. The city was once served by a station on the Vale of Clwyd Railway line, which closed in the 1960s. However, the station remains and the site is now in use as a builders yard. The nearest stations are now in Rhyl and Pensarn. The city is also close to the heritage railways at Llangollen and Bala Lake in the town of Bala.

== Notable people ==
See Category:People from St Asaph

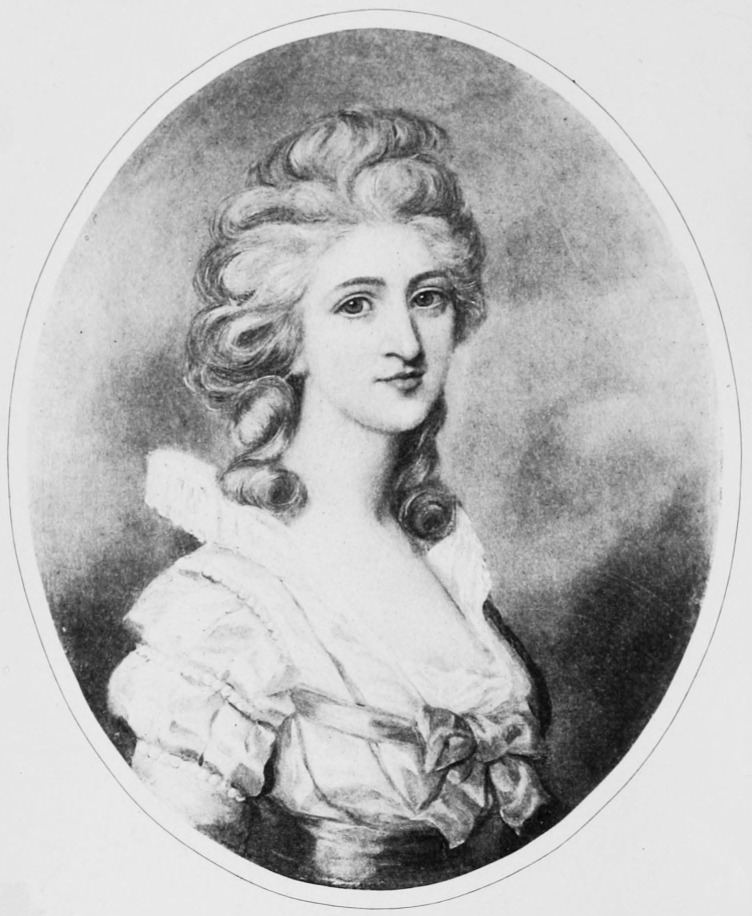
Georgiana Hare-Naylor, 1780

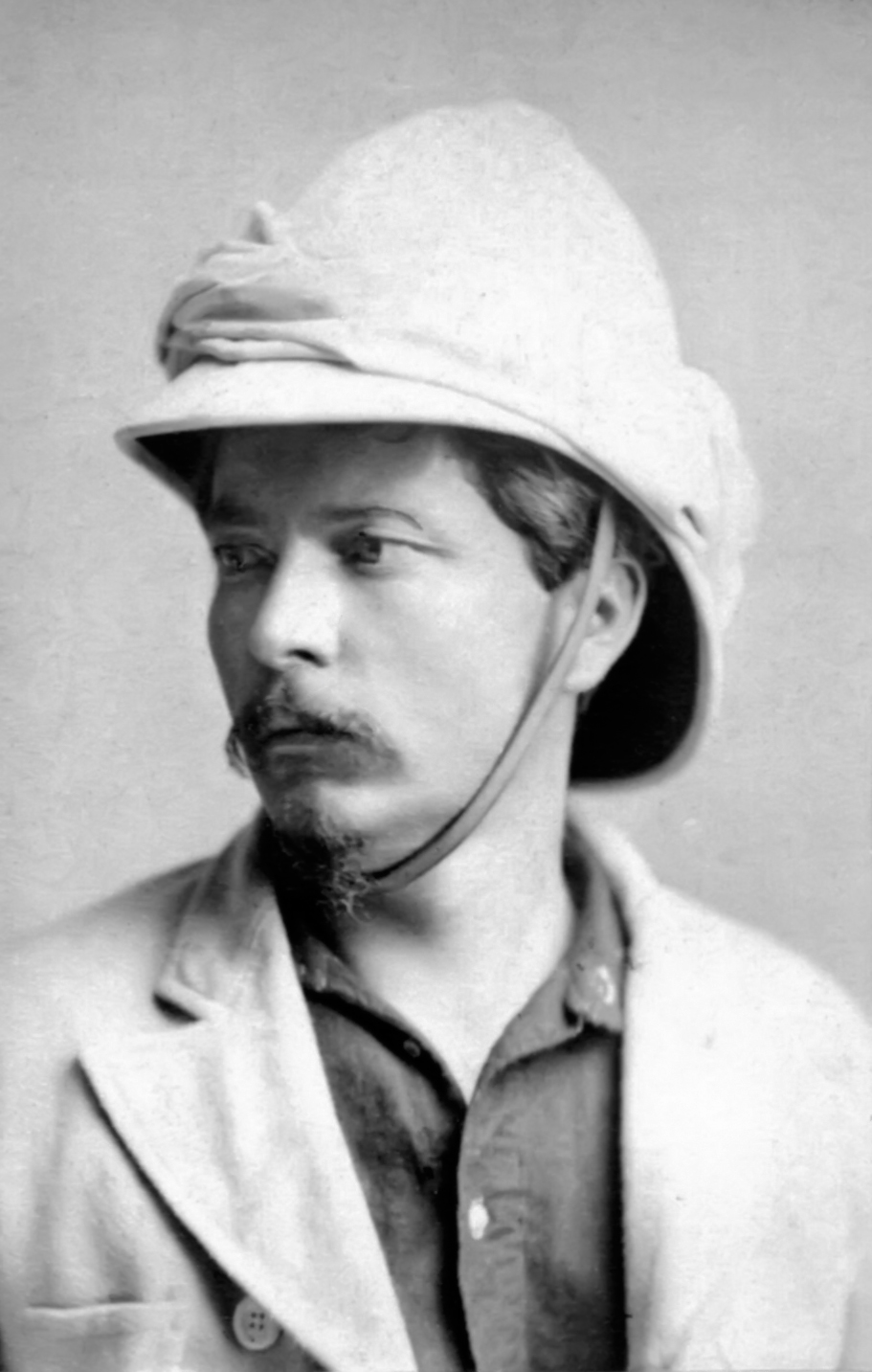
Sir Henry Morton Stanley 1872

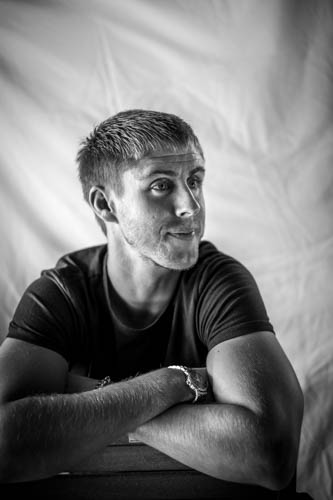
Ash Dykes, 2016

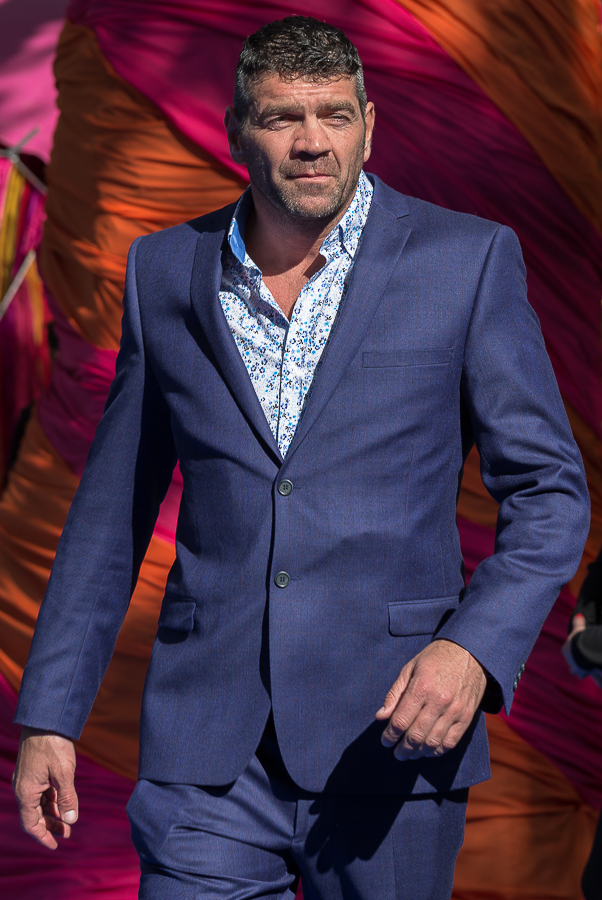
Spencer Wilding, 2015

A number of famous people have strong links to St Asaph, having been born, raised, lived, worked or died in the city. These include:

- William Morgan (1545–1604), translated the Bible into Welsh, later Lord Bishop of St Asaph
- Georgiana Hare-Naylor (c. 1755 – 1806) an English painter and art patron.
- Dic Aberdaron (1780–1843), traveller and polyglot who taught himself Latin at the age of 11
- Felicia Hemans (1793–1835), poet who wrote the poem Casabianca
- G. W. Hemans (1814–1885), architect and engineer, engineered the Vale of Clwyd Railway line through St Asaph
- Sir Henry Morton Stanley (1841–1904), explorer and journalist.
- A. G. Edwards, (1848–1937), Lord Bishop of St Asaph the first Lord Archbishop of Wales in the Church in Wales
- Felix Powell (1878–1942), British Army Staff Sergeant wrote the music to Pack Up Your Troubles in Your Old Kit Bag
- George Henry Powell (1880–1951), songwriter who wrote the lyrics to Pack Up Your Troubles in Your Old Kit Bag
- William Mathias (1934–1992), composer of choral works, lived and was buried in St Asaph.
- Geoffrey James (born 1942), Canadian photographer
- Gareth Jones (born 1961), television presenter
- Jo Caulfield (born 1963), actress, writer and comedian
- Antony John Williams (born 1964), chemist, science-blogger and author
- Russell Morris (born 1967), Professor of Chemistry at the University of St Andrews and former first-class cricketer
- Carl Sargeant (1968–2017), Welsh politician
- Greg Davies (born 1968), comedian, presenter, actor and writer
- Steve Williams (born 1971), keyboard player, founder of Power Quest and former member of DragonForce
- Spencer Wilding (born 1972), actor and stunt performer
- Richard Ian Cox (born 1973), Vancouver-based voice actor and online radio host
- Lisa Scott-Lee (born 1975), singer, member of Steps
- Paul Mealor (born 1975), composer, much of his output is for chorus
- James Davies (born 1980), Conservative Party politician and former MP for the Vale of Clwyd
- Bryan Parry (born 1992), actor

=== Sport ===
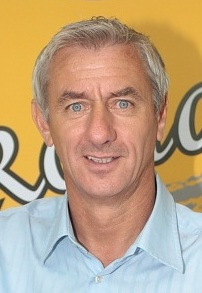
Ian Rush, 2010

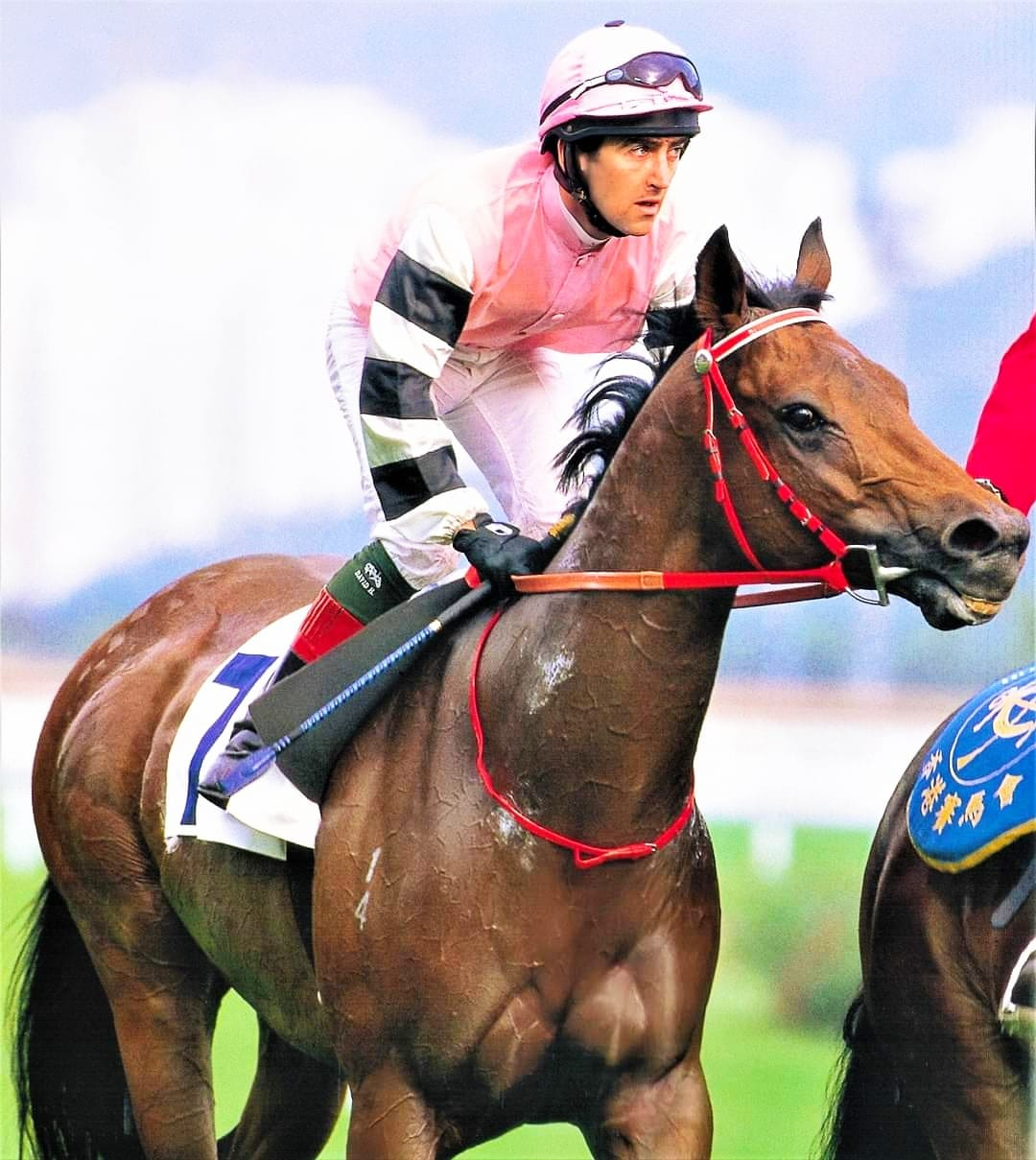
David Harrison, 1999

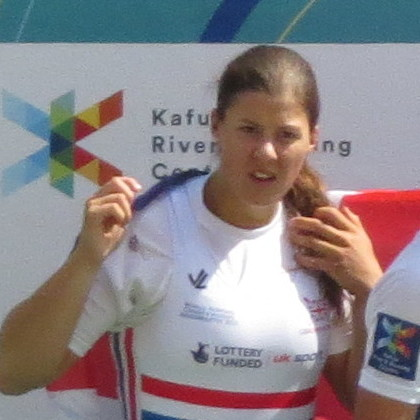
Rebecca Chin, 2015

- Rosamund Colman (1885–1950) international golf and tennis player a member of the Salusbury family.
- Alan Rudkin (1941–2010), British, Commonwealth and European bantamweight boxing champion
- Brynley Jones (born 1959), footballer with over 190 club caps
- Ian Rush (born 1961), footballer, former Wales captain and record goalscorer for Liverpool with 346 goals
- Barry Horne (born 1962), footballer with over 540 club caps and 59 for Wales
- Paul Affleck (born 1966), professional golfer who has played on the European Tour
- Darren Owen (born 1967), horse racing commentator
- David Harrison (born 1972), jockey, winner of 1992 Royal Hunt Cup at Royal Ascot
- Rob Higgitt (born 1981), rugby union player
- Eifion Lewis-Roberts (born 1981), rugby union prop forward
- Becky Brewerton (born 1982), golfer on the Ladies European Tour
- Mark Webster (born 1983), former professional darts player
- Pat Leach (born 1985), rugby union player for Newport RFC and the Newport Gwent Dragons regional team
- Andy Fenby (born 1985), former rugby union footballer
- Victoria Thornley (born 1987), rower, team silver medalist in the women's double sculls at the 2016 Summer Olympics
- Neil Taylor (born 1989), footballer, with 338 club caps and 43 for Wales international and Team GB squad member for the London 2012 Olympics
- Dyddgu Hywel (born 1989), rugby union fullback for Gloucester–Hartpury and Wales women
- Chris Maxwell (born 1990), football goalkeeper with over 400 club caps and captain of Blackpool
- Rebecca Chin (born 1991), athlete, silver medalist at the 2015 World Rowing Championships and represented Great Britain in discus and shot put at the 2008 Summer Paralympics

Another well-known individual, Geoffrey of Monmouth, served as Lord Bishop of St Asaph from 1152 to 1155; however, due to war and unrest in Wales at the time, he probably never set foot in his see.

The hospital in the city (formerly the St Asaph Union Workhouse) was named H.M. Stanley Hospital in honour of Sir Henry Morton Stanley; it closed in 2012. The city's hospice was named after Saint Kentigern.
