= Bontnewydd Palaeolithic site =

Cave and archaeological site in Wales

Bontnewydd palaeolithic site
- Pontnewydd
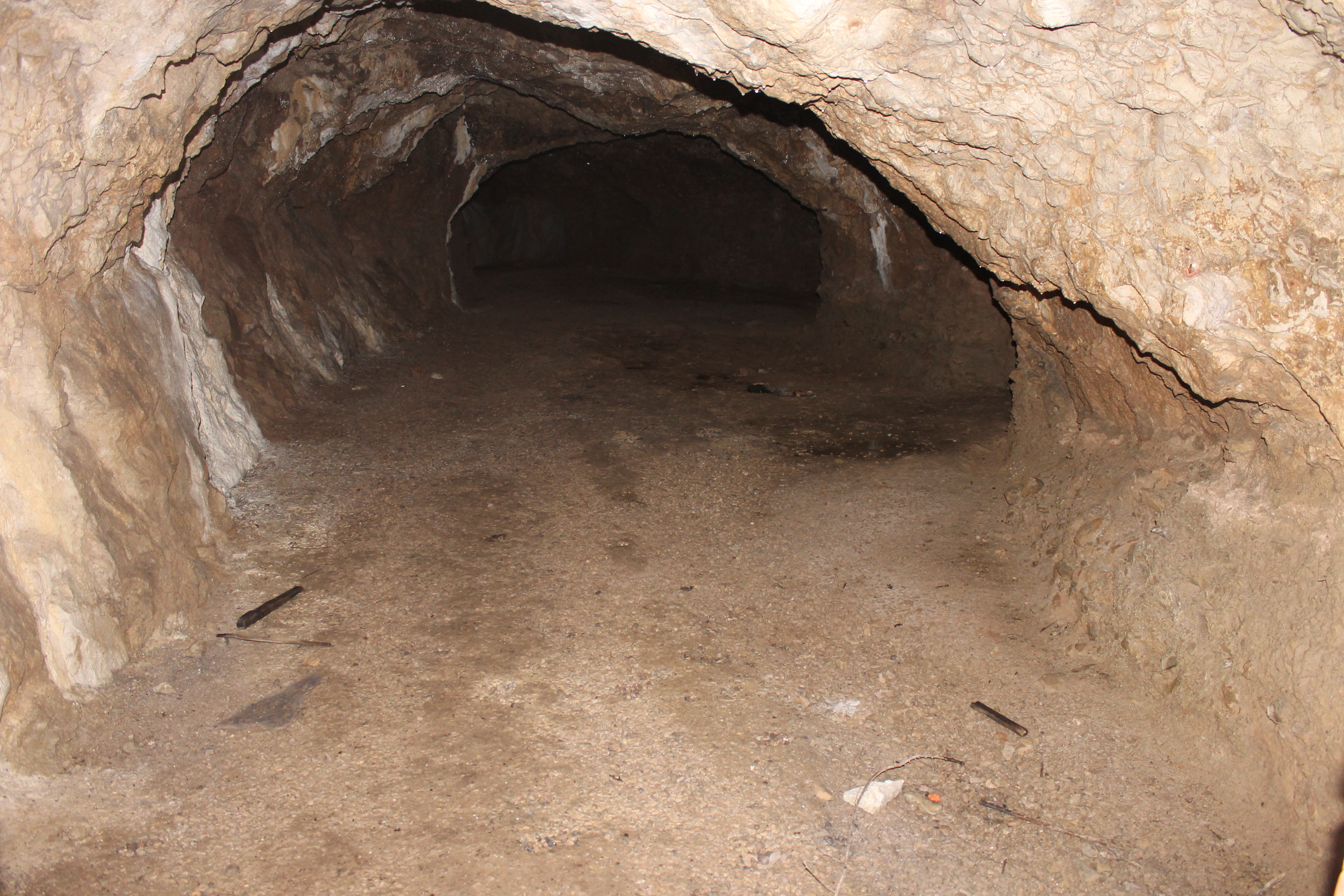
- cave entry

- Location within Wales Location within the United Kingdom
- 53°13′37″N 3°28′34″W
- Periods: Paleolithic
- Associated with: Neanderthals
- Location: near St Asaph
- Region: Denbighshire, Wales

Site notes
- Excavation dates: 1978
- Archaeologists: Stephen Aldhouse Green

The Bontnewydd palaeolithic site (Welsh: [bɔntˈnɛuɨ̯ð]), also known in its unmutated form as Pontnewydd (Welsh for 'new bridge'), is an archaeological site near St Asaph, Denbighshire, Wales. It is one of only three sites in Britain to have produced fossils of ancient species of humans (together with Boxgrove and Swanscombe) and the only one with fossils of a classic Neanderthal. It is located a few yards east of the River Elwy, near the hamlet of Bontnewydd, near Cefn Meiriadog, Denbighshire.

== Palaeolithic site ==
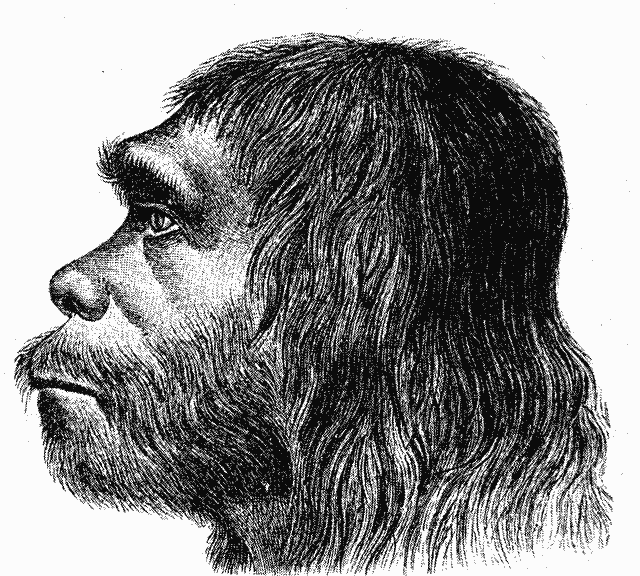
Neanderthal from the period

Bontnewydd was excavated from 1978 by a team from the University of Wales, led by Dr. Stephen Aldhouse Green. Teeth and part of a jawbone from a Neanderthal boy approximately eleven years old were dated to 230,000 years ago. Seventeen teeth from at least five individuals were found.

The teeth show evidence of taurodontism, enlarged pulp cavities and short roots, which is characteristic of Neanderthals, and although it is not unique to them it is one of the reasons that the species was identified as Neanderthal.

In Britain, the wolf (Canis lupus) was the only canid species present from Marine Isotope Stage 7 (243,000 years before present), with the oldest record from Pontnewydd Cave.

The site is also important for its mammoth steppe fauna, such as reindeer and woolly rhinoceros, dating to between around 41,000 and 28,000 years ago. There were also stone tools and the animal bones might have come from the people's food.

== See also ==
- Prehistoric Wales
- Prehistoric Britain
- List of human evolution fossils
- List of Neanderthal sites
- List of prehistoric structures in Great Britain

== Sources ==
- Ashton, Nick (2017). Early Humans. London, UK: William Collins. ISBN 978-0-00-815035-8.
- Pettit, Paul; White, Mark (2012). The British Palaeolithic: Human Societies at the Edge of the Pleistocene World. London, UK: Routledge. ISBN 978-0-415-67455-3.
- Stringer, Chris (5 October 2006). Homo Britannicus: The Incredible Story of Human Life in Britain. Allen Lane. ISBN 978-0-7139-9795-8. (alt ISBN 0-7139-9795-8)
