= Hueil mab Caw =

In Welsh tradition, Hueil mab Caw (also spelled Huail or Cuillus) was a Brythonic warrior and traditional rival of King Arthur's. He was one of the numerous sons of Caw of Prydyn and brother to Saint Gildas.

The Latin Life of Gildas by Caradoc of Llancarfan describes Hueil as an "active warrior and most distinguished soldier", who led a number of violent and sweeping raids from Scotland down into Arthur's territory. As a result, Arthur marched on Hueil and pursued him as far as the Isle of Man, where he killed the young plunderer. Giraldus Cambrensis alludes to this tradition, claiming that Gildas destroyed "a number of outstanding books" praising Arthur after hearing of the death of his brother.

A variation of Hueil's death, chronicled by Elis Gruffudd, is as follows:

Kaw o Brydain was the name of a chieftain who ruled over Edeirnion, in North Wales. He had two sons, Gildas and Huail. Huail was gwr gorhewg anllad 'cheeky and wanton'. He obtained possession of one of Arthur's mistresses. Arthur came to spy upon the pair, and a fierce combat took place between him and Huail. Finally Huail wounded Arthur in the knee. After this peace was made between them, on the condition that Huail should never reproach Arthur with regard to his wound. Arthur returned to his court at Caerwys, but for ever after he remained slightly lame.

On a subsequent occasion Arthur dressed himself in woman's clothes in order to visit a girl at Rhuthun. Huail chanced to come there, and he recognised Arthur by his lameness, as he was dancing in a company of girls. These were his words: Da iawn yw downshio velly oni bai'r glun 'This dancing were all right if it were not for the knee'. Arthur heard them and knew who had spoken them. He returned to his court where he caused Huail to be brought before him, and he reproached him bitterly with his faithlessness. Huail was taken to Rhuthun, where Arthur cut off his head on a stone in the market-place, which to this day is known as Maen Huail.

The feud between Hueil and Arthur is further alluded to in the early Arthurian tale Culhwch and Olwen in which Hueil alongside his many brothers is a knight of Arthur's court and is described as having "never submitted to a lord's hand." The text refers to an incident in which Hueil stabbed his nephew, Gwydre ap Llwydeu, which was the source of the enmity between them. The Welsh Triads refer to Hueil as one of the three "battle-diademed" warriors alongside Cai and Drustan, but inferior to Bedwyr.

Hueil is further mentioned in the late twelfth century Englynion y Clyweit, a collection of proverbial englyns attributed to various historical and mythological heroes. The text describes him as "the son of Caw, whose saying was just" and claims that he once sang the proverb "Often will a curse fall from the bosom."
