= Cefn Caves =

Group of caves in Denbighshire, Wales

Coordinates: 53.2227°N 3.4685°W

Cefn Caves are a group of four interlinked caves in the limestone cliffs of the Elwy valley, north of Denbigh, in Denbighshire, North Wales. Early excavations found both human and animal remains dating back to the Paleolithic period. The cave network is a Scheduled Ancient Monument.

The network of caves was first excavated in the 1830s by the Rev E. Stanley, finding fragments of stone tools along with numerous animal bones which had been laid down over a wide period, probably accumulated in the caves by water action.

The 'Old Cave' passage is a remnant of a former underground course of the River Elwy, eroded through the limestone and then left behind by the continued downcutting of the gorge. The cave complex is used for caving activities by a nearby outdoor activity centre.

== See also ==
- List of scheduled monuments in Denbighshire
