= Waen =

Community in Denbighshire, Wales

Waen: Welsh: Waun
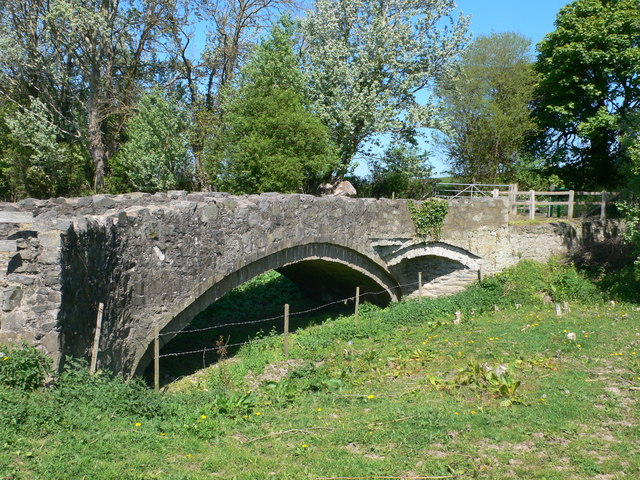
- Pont Dafydd

- Location within Denbighshire
- Population: 241 (2011)
- OS grid reference: SJ064735
- Community: Waen
- Principal area: Denbighshire
- Preserved county: Clwyd
- Country: Wales
- Sovereign state: United Kingdom
- Post town: ST ASAPH
- Postcode district: LL17
- Dialling code: 01745
- Police: North Wales
- Fire: North Wales
- Ambulance: Welsh
- UK Parliament: Clwyd East
- Senedd Cymru – Welsh Parliament: Vale of Clwyd
- List of places UK Wales Denbighshire 53.250°N 3.403°W Map of the community

Waen (Welsh: Waun) is a sparsely populated community in the Vale of Clwyd, in the Welsh county of Denbighshire. It includes the hamlet of Waen Goleugoed. The former civil parish was created in 1896 from the Flintshire portion of St Asaph, and lies on the eastern bank of the River Clwyd, 2.7 miles (4.3 km) east of St Asaph, 15.4 miles (24.8 km) north west of Mold, 5.1 miles (8.2 km) north of Denbigh and 11.9 miles (19.2 km) north of Ruthin. At the 2001 census the community had a population of 245, falling slightly to 241 at the 2011 census. The North Wales Expressway (A55) crosses the community from east to west, on its route from Chester to Bangor.

The farmhouse at Bodeugan, in the north of the community, dates from the 17th century, and is Grade II* listed. The Flintshire county archives at Hawarden contain a letter dated Christmas 1812, in which the then tenant, Robert Roberts, complained that the house was bewitched, recounting a series of poltergeist activity in which stones, coals, dung and water were thrown at the inhabitants, windows were broken and milk churns smashed. On Christmas Eve, the spirit was claimed to have thrown the servants out of their beds. Pont Dafydd, built in 1630 across the River Clwyd, but now standing in a field since the river was diverted, is an ancient monument and is Grade II listed.
