= Lists of schools in the United Kingdom =

Home Nations of the United Kingdom

The lists of schools in the United Kingdom are organised by country:

== United Kingdom ==
- List of boarding schools in the United Kingdom
- List of boys' schools in the United Kingdom
- List of dental schools in the United Kingdom
- List of girls' schools in the United Kingdom
- List of historical medical schools in the United Kingdom
- List of medical schools in the United Kingdom
- List of music schools in the United Kingdom
- List of pharmacy schools in the United Kingdom
- List of private schools in the United Kingdom
- List of the oldest schools in the United Kingdom

== England ==
- Lists of schools in England
- List of grammar schools in England
- List of middle schools in England
- List of private schools in England
- List of state boarding schools in England

== Northern Ireland ==
- List of primary schools in Northern Ireland
- List of secondary schools in Northern Ireland
- List of grammar schools in Northern Ireland
- List of integrated schools in Northern Ireland

== Scotland ==
- List of state schools in Scotland (city council areas)
- List of state schools in Scotland (council areas excluding cities, A–D)
- List of state schools in Scotland (council areas excluding cities, E–H)
- List of state schools in Scotland (council areas excluding cities, I–R)
- List of state schools in Scotland (council areas excluding cities, S–W)
- List of Catholic schools in Scotland
- List of Gaelic medium schools in Scotland
- List of private schools in Scotland

== Wales ==
- List of schools in Anglesey
- List of schools in Blaenau Gwent
- List of schools in Bridgend County Borough
- List of schools in Caerphilly County Borough
- List of schools in Cardiff
- List of schools in Carmarthenshire
- List of schools in Ceredigion
- List of schools in Conwy County Borough
- List of schools in Denbighshire
- List of schools in Flintshire
- List of schools in Gwynedd
- List of schools in Merthyr Tydfil County Borough
- List of schools in Monmouthshire
- List of schools in Neath Port Talbot
- List of schools in Newport, Wales
- List of schools in Pembrokeshire
- List of schools in Powys
- List of schools in Rhondda Cynon Taf
- List of schools in Swansea
- List of schools in Torfaen
- List of schools in the Vale of Glamorgan
- List of schools in Wrexham County Borough

== Territories ==
- List of schools in Guernsey
- List of schools in the Isle of Man
- List of schools in Jersey
