= List of schools in the Vale of Glamorgan =

This is a list of schools in the Vale of Glamorgan in Wales.

== Nursery schools ==
- Cadoxton Nursery School
- Cogan Nursery School
- Bute Cottage Nursery School
- Little Westbourne Nursery School

== Primary schools ==
- Albert Primary School
- All Saints CW Primary School
- Barry Island Primary School
- Cadoxton Primary School
- Cogan Primary School
- Colcot Primary School
- Cowbridge Primary School
- Dinas Powys Primary School
- Evenlode Primary School
- Fairfield Primary School
- Gladstone Primary School
- Gwenfo CW Primary School
- High Street Primary School
- Holton Primary School
- Jenner Park Primary School
- Llandough Primary School
- Llanfair Primary School
- Llangan Primary School
- Llansannor CW Primary School
- Oakfield Primary School
- Palmerston Primary School
- Pendoylan CW Primary School
- Peterston-Super-Ely CW Primary School
- Rhws Primary School
- Romilly Primary School
- South Point Primary School
- St. Andrew's Major CW Primary School
- St. Athan Primary School
- St Bride's Major CW Primary School
- St David's CW Primary School
- St Illtyd Primary School
- St Helen's RC Infant School
- St Helen's RC Junior School
- St Joseph's RC Primary School
- St Nicholas CW Primary School
- Sully Primary School
- Victoria Primary School
- Wick & Marcross CW Primary School
- Y Bont Faen Primary School
- Ysgol Y Ddraig

== Welsh medium primary schools ==
- Ysgol Bro Morgannwg
- Ysgol Dewi Sant
- Ysgol Gwaun y Nant
- Ysgol Gymraeg Pen-y-Garth
- Ysgol Iolo Morganwg
- Ysgol Sant Baruc
- Ysgol Sant Curig

== Secondary schools ==
- Cowbridge Comprehensive School
- Llantwit Major School
- Mary Immaculate High School (administered as part of the Cardiff local education authority)
- Pencoedtre High School
- St Cyres School
- St Richard Gwyn RC High School
- Stanwell School
- Whitmore High School

== Welsh medium secondary schools ==
- Ysgol Gyfun Bro Morgannwg

== Pupil referral units ==
- Derw Newydd

== Special schools ==
- Ysgol Y Deri

== Independent special schools ==
- Headlands School
- Beechwood College (A further education college aged 16–25 for Aspergers and Autism.)

== Independent schools ==
- Atlantic College
- Westbourne Prep School

== Further education colleges ==
- Cardiff and Vale College
