= List of schools in Pembrokeshire =

This is a list of schools in Pembrokeshire in Wales.

== English-medium primary schools ==
- Angle Primary School
- Bro Dewi Primary School
- Broad Haven Primary School
- Cleddau Reach Primary School
- Coastlands Primary School
- Cosheston Primary School
- Croesgoch Primary School
- Fenton Primary School
- Golden Grove Primary School (Dual Stream - Welsh & English classes)
- Goodwick Primary School (Transition school - Foundation Phase mainly through the medium of Welsh. At KS2 both languages used.)
- Hakin Primary School
- Haverfordwest Primary School
- Holy Name RC Primary School
- Hook Primary School
- Hubberston Primary School
- Johnston Primary School
- Lamphey Primary School
- Manorbier Primary School
- Mary Immaculate RC Primary School
- Meads Infants School
- Milford Haven Junior School
- Monkton Priory Primary School
- Mount Airley Primary School
- Nant-y-Cwm Steiner School
- Narberth Primary School (Dual stream - Welsh & English classes)
- Neyland Primary School
- Orielton Primary School
- Pembroke Dock Primary School
- Pennar Primary School
- Prendergast Primary School
- Puncheston Primary School
- Roch Primary School
- Sageston Primary School
- St Aiden's Primary School
- St Dogmaels Primary School
- St Florence Primary School
- St Francis RC Primary School
- St Mark's Primary School
- St Mary's RC Primary School
- St Oswald's Primary School
- St Teilo's RC Primary School
- Saundersfoot Primary School
- Stepaside Primary School
- Solva Primary School
- Spittal Primary School
- Stackpole Primary School
- Tavernspite Primary School
- Templeton Primary School
- Tenby Primary School
- Wolfcastle Primary School

== Welsh medium primary schools ==
- Ysgol Casblaidd
- Ysgol Bro Ingi
- Ysgol Brynconin
- Ysgol Cilgerran
- Ysgol Clydau
- Ysgol Eglwyswrw
- Ysgol Ger Y Llan
- Ysgol Glannau Gwaun
- Ysgol Hafan y Mor
- Ysgol Llanychllwydog
- Ysgol Maenclochog
- Ysgol Y Frenni

== Secondary schools ==
- Milford Haven School
- Henry Tudor School
- Haverfordwest High VC School, opened in 2018 with the merger of Tasker-Milward V.C. School and Sir Thomas Picton School
- Ysgol Greenhill School
- Ysgol Bro Gwaun
- Ysgol Penrhyn Dewi, opened in 2018 with the merger of as Ysgol Dewi Sant, Ysgol Bro Dewi and Solva Community School

== Welsh medium secondary schools ==
- Ysgol y Preseli
- Ysgol Caer Elen - 3-16 school

== Special schools ==
- Portfield School

== Independent schools ==
- Nant-y-Cwm Steiner School
- Redhill High School
- Castle School Pembrokeshire

== Further education colleges ==
- Pembrokeshire College
