= Cory Allen (rugby union) =

Wales international rugby union player

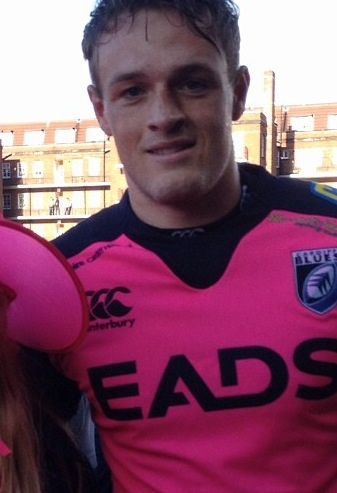
- Allen at The Arms Park in 2013
- Born: 11 February 1993 (age 33) Cardiff, Wales
- Height: 1.91 m (6 ft 3 in)
- Weight: 100 kg (220 lb)
- School: Ysgol Gyfun Bro Morgannwg
- Notable relative: Mason Grady (brother)

Rugby union career
- Position(s): Outside Centre; Wing
Senior career
Years	Team	Apps	(Points)
2011–2017	Cardiff Blues	55	(71)
2017–2021	Ospreys	33	(40)
2021–2022	Dragons RFC		
- Correct as of 29 December 2022
International career
Years	Team	Apps	(Points)
- Wales U18
2012–2013	Wales U20	13	(20)
2013–2017	Wales	6	(15)
- Correct as of 23 June 2017
National sevens team
Years	Team		Comps
2012–2013	Wales		4

Cory Allen (born 11 February 1993) is a retired Welsh international rugby union player. A centre or wing, he played for Cardiff Blues and the Ospreys. Allen joined the Dragons in 2021, but did not feature for the side.

== Club career ==
At age 18, Allen made his professional debut for Cardiff Blues in October 2011, starting against Newcastle Falcons in the Anglo-Welsh Cup.

Allen was named man of the match on 20 April 2014, as Cardiff beat the Scarlets 17–13 at the Millennium Stadium in the annual Judgement Day match.

Allen joined the Ospreys in 2017, after six years with Cardiff. While with the Ospreys, Allen suffered a serious knee injury in September 2019, and did not feature for the club again prior to his release in 2021.

In 2021, Allen joined Dragons RFC. Soon after joining, he suffered a further setback on his injury recovery. Allen never featured for the Dragons, announcing his retirement on 29 December 2022.

== International career ==
Allen started for Wales U20 against New Zealand U20 on 8 June 2012, Wales defeating them 9–6 to earn their first win at this age group.

He was selected in the Wales Sevens squad for 2012-13.

In January 2013 he was selected in the Wales Under 20 squad for the 2013 Under 20 Six Nations Championship. He made his full international debut versus Argentina on 16 Nov 2013. He suffered a shoulder injury during the match, sidelining him for the remainder of the tournament. This injury ultimately ruled him out of the 2014 Six Nations.

Allen scored a hat-trick of tries in Wales first game of the 2015 Rugby World Cup, a 54–9 win against Uruguay at the Millennium Stadium on 20 September. Allen was named man of the match, but suffered a hamstring injury which ruled him out for the remainder of the tournament.

Allen again scored a hat-trick of tries for Wales in a match against RGC 1404, in the warm-up for 2017 summer tour of Tonga and Samoa.

Allen was named in the Wales squad for the 2017 Wales rugby union tour of Tonga and Samoa, coming off the bench against Tonga, and starting on the wing against Samoa.

=== International tries ===
Try	Opponent	Location	Venue	Competition	Date	Result
1	Uruguay	Cardiff, Wales	Millennium Stadium	2015 Rugby World Cup	20 September 2015	Win
2	Uruguay	Cardiff, Wales	Millennium Stadium	2015 Rugby World Cup	20 September 2015	Win
3	Uruguay	Cardiff, Wales	Millennium Stadium	2015 Rugby World Cup	20 September 2015	Win

== Personal life ==
Allen comes from a sporting family: his mother Julie represented Wales in basketball and appeared in the Commonwealth Games, brother Ashton has also represented Wales in basketball, and his younger brother Mason Grady has followed in his footsteps, playing for Cardiff Rugby as a centre.
