= Harry Wilson (footballer, born 1997) =

Welsh footballer

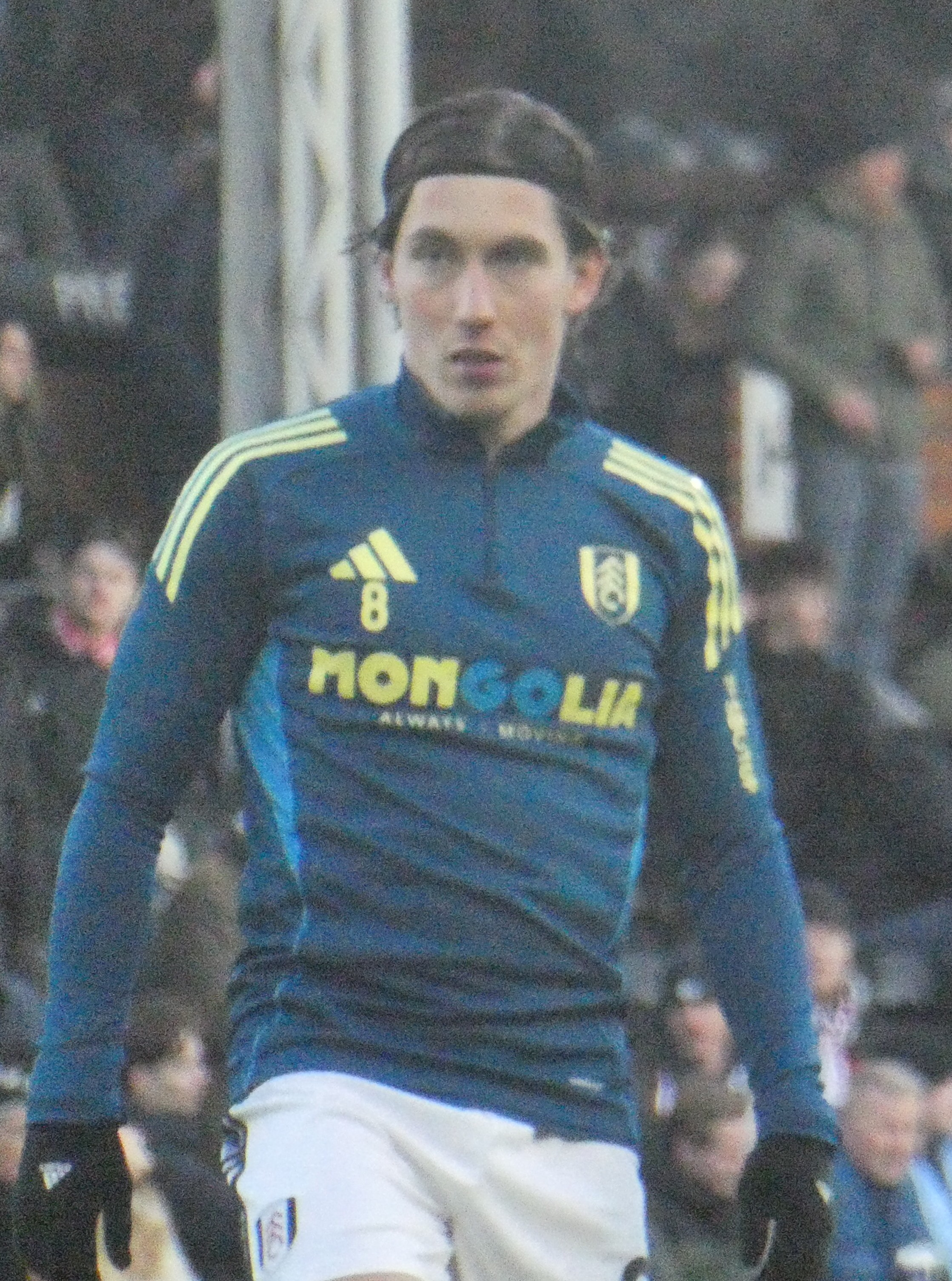
- Wilson with Fulham in 2026

Personal information
- Full name: Harry Wilson
- Date of birth: 22 March 1997 (age 29)
- Place of birth: Wrexham, Wales
- Height: 5 ft 8 in (1.73 m)
- Position: Right winger

Team information
- Current team: Leeds United
- Number: 10

Youth career
- 2005–2014: Liverpool

Senior career*
Years	Team	Apps	(Gls)
2014–2022	Liverpool	0	(0)
2015	→ Crewe Alexandra (loan)	7	(0)
2018	→ Hull City (loan)	13	(7)
2018–2019	→ Derby County (loan)	40	(15)
2019–2020	→ AFC Bournemouth (loan)	31	(7)
2020–2021	→ Cardiff City (loan)	37	(7)
2021–2022	→ Fulham (loan)	41	(10)
2022–2026	Fulham	125	(22)
2026–	Leeds United	3	(0)

International career^{‡}
2013	Wales U17	3	(3)
2014	Wales U19	2	(1)
2015–2017	Wales U21	10	(2)
2013–	Wales	71	(17)
- * Club domestic league appearances and goals as of 05:03, 6 September 2026 (UTC) ‡ National team caps and goals as of 22:11, 17 November 2026 (UTC)

Harry Wilson (born 22 March 1997) is a Welsh professional footballer who plays as a winger or attacking midfielder for Premier League club Leeds United and the Wales national team.

A product of Liverpool's Academy, Wilson joined the club in 2005 at the age of 8 but would only register 2 first team appearances for Liverpool, being sent out on loan to various clubs throughout the English football pyramid including Crewe Alexandra, Hull City, Derby County (where he helped the club reach the 2019 Championship play-off final), Bournemouth (where he got his first season of Premier League experience), Cardiff City and Fulham. On loan at Fulham, Wilson won the 2021–22 EFL Championship title and the club promotion to the Premier League, being included in the PFA's and EFL's Championship Team of the Season. Wilson would sign permanently for Fulham from Liverpool for their first season back in the top flight.

At international level, Wilson became the youngest player to represent Wales in October 2013 at the age of 16 years and 207 days, beating a record previously held by Gareth Bale. He also became Liverpool's youngest international and a rare player to make their senior international debut before their senior club debut. Wilson was part of the Wales team that qualified for the FIFA World Cup in 2022 for the first time since 1958.

== Club career ==
=== Liverpool ===
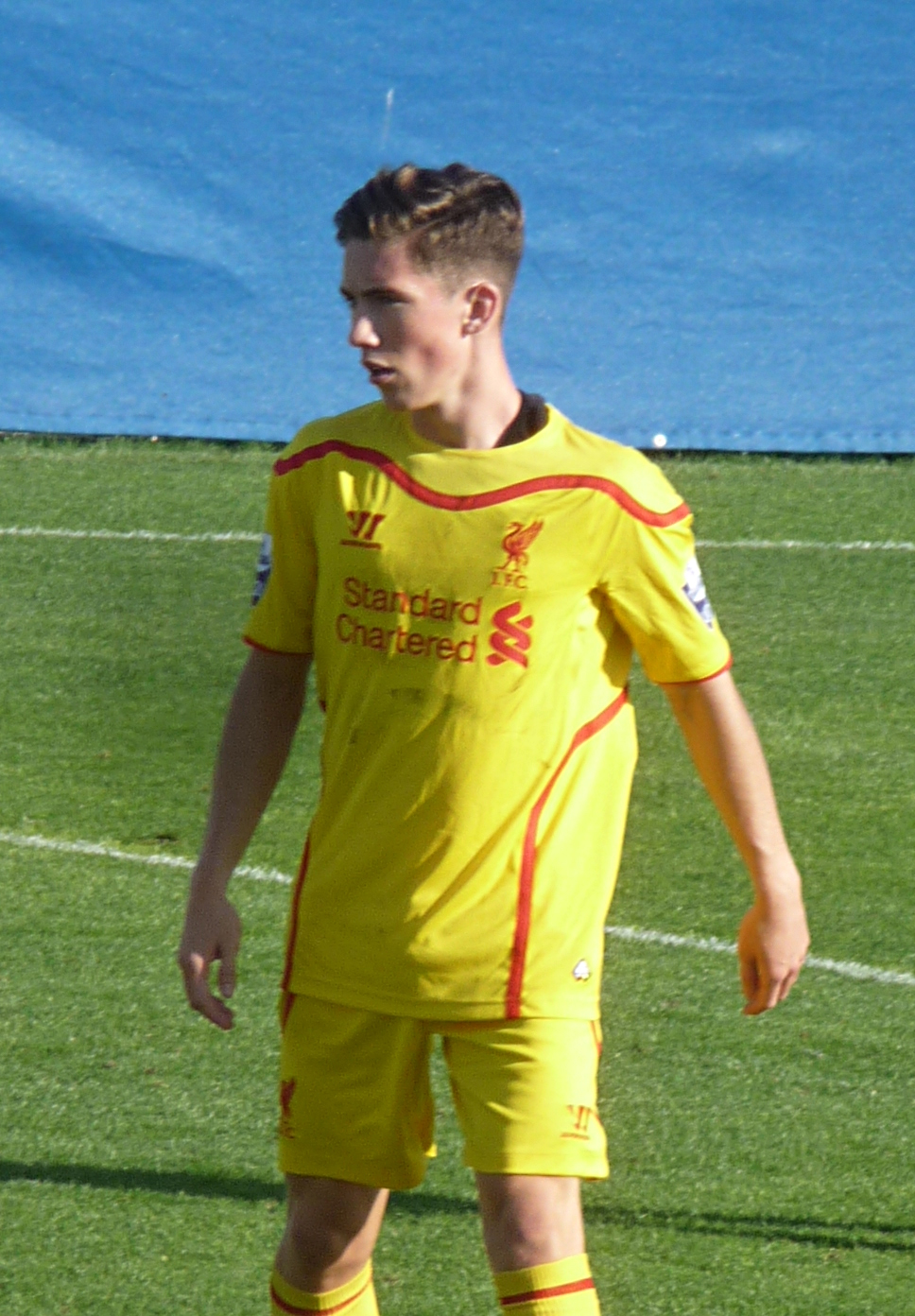
Wilson playing for Liverpool U19s in 2014

Born in Wrexham, Wilson was schooled at Ysgol Dinas Brân in Llangollen. He first signed to Liverpool as a member of the U9s squad. At the age of 15 he became a full-time member of the Liverpool Academy squad. During the 2012–13 campaign, Wilson featured for the U18s and was a regular face in the U16 side. For the beginning of the next season, he was promoted to the U18s full-time. In 2014, Wilson was joint top scorer with fellow Liverpool youngster Sheyi Ojo at the Ajax Future Cup.

In July 2014, Wilson signed his first professional contract with the club. He competed in the 2014–15 UEFA Youth League in which Liverpool reached the last 16, and scored an 88th-minute winner in a 3–2 home win over Real Madrid on 22 October 2014.

On 11 July 2015, Wilson was named in Liverpool's 30-man squad for their pre-season tour of Thailand, Australia and Malaysia. On 16 August he was crowned best forward of the 2015 PSV Otten Cup.

==== Loan to Crewe Alexandra ====
On 26 August 2015, Wilson joined League One side Crewe Alexandra on a youth loan deal for four months until 5 January 2016. He made his debut against Millwall as a 67th-minute substitute for David Fox in a 1–3 loss at Gresty Road on 12 September, and his first start in a goalless draw away to Burton Albion on 20 October. Wilson was recalled from his loan spell on 1 December.

==== Return to Liverpool ====
On 28 July 2016, Wilson signed a new contract with Liverpool, and was shortly named the under-23 captain. He made his first team debut for the club on 18 January 2017, in a 1–0 away win over Plymouth Argyle in an FA Cup third round replay, replacing Philippe Coutinho in the 65th minute.

Wilson was named Liverpool Academy Players' Player of the Year for the 2017–18 season.

Wilson made his last appearance and only start for Liverpool on 1 October 2020 in an EFL Cup penalties loss against Arsenal.

==== Loan to Hull City ====
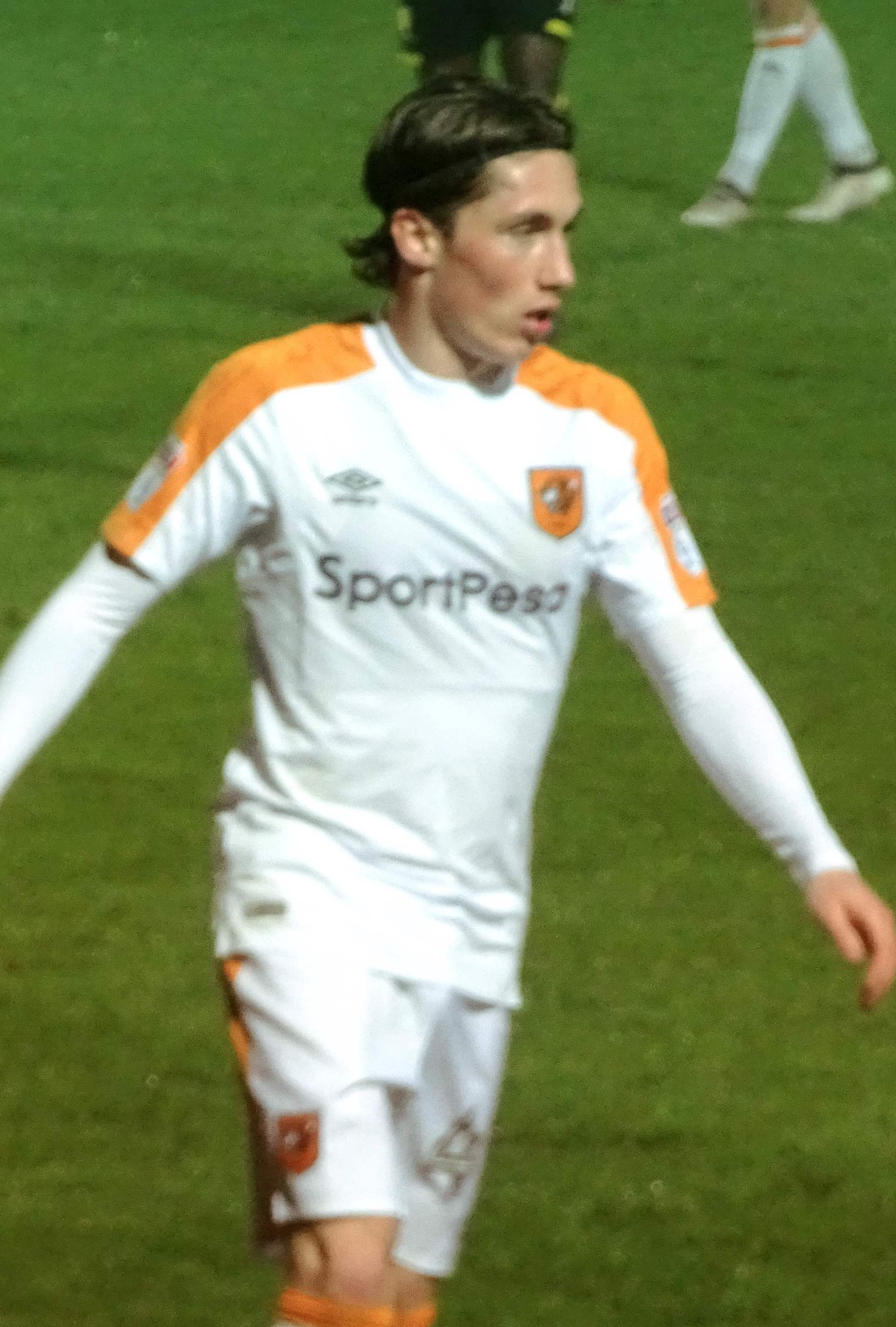
Wilson playing for Hull City in 2018

On 31 January 2018, Wilson signed a new deal with Liverpool and was loaned to Hull City until the end of the season. He made his debut coming off the bench in the 69th minute as a replacement for Fraizer Campbell in a 2–1 Championship defeat against Preston North End at Deepdale on 3 February.

He scored his first professional goal in his second appearance a week later in a 0–2 away win at Nottingham Forest. The following month, he scored two goals and recorded two assists to help Hull away from the relegation zone and won the club's Player of the Month award for March. He also won the EFL Championship PFA Player of the Month award for April 2018. He scored seven goals in 13 league appearances for Hull during his loan spell.

==== Loan to Derby County ====
On 10 July 2018, Wilson signed a new five-year contract at Liverpool. A week later, he joined Championship club Derby County on a season-long loan, linking up with fellow Wales players Tom Lawrence and Joe Ledley.

He made his debut for the club managed by Frank Lampard on 3 August, starting as they began their season with a 2–1 win at Reading. On 22 September, he scored his first Rams goal to equalise as they came from behind to win 3–1 at home to Brentford. Three days later, he did the same with a bending 30-yard free kick in the third round of the EFL Cup away to Manchester United and scored in an 8–7 penalty shootout win after a 2–2 draw.

==== Loan to AFC Bournemouth ====
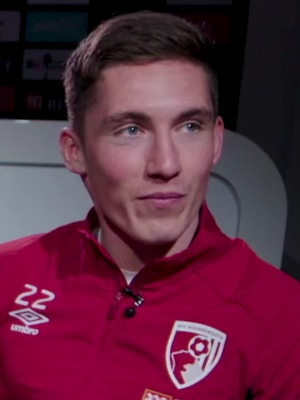
Wilson with AFC Bournemouth in 2020

Wilson joined Premier League club AFC Bournemouth on 6 August 2019 on loan for the 2019–20 season. On 17 August, he scored the first goal for Bournemouth on his début against Aston Villa in a 2–1 away win. On 25 August 2019, he scored a free kick from just outside the box against Manchester City in a 3–1 loss at home. In March 2020, he was criticised for wearing a Liverpool coat while watching Bournemouth play them.

==== Loan to Cardiff City ====
On 16 October 2020, Wilson joined Championship club Cardiff City on a season-long loan. He made his debut for the club on 18 October as a first half substitute in place of Greg Cunningham in a 1–0 victory over Preston North End, before scoring his first goal in a 1–1 draw with former club Bournemouth three days later. He scored his first professional hat trick in a 4–0 away win at Birmingham City on 1 May 2021.

=== Fulham ===
On 24 July 2021, Wilson joined Championship side Fulham on an initial loan deal from Liverpool followed by a permanent transfer and a four-year contract. He scored on his Fulham debut in a 1–1 draw with Middlesbrough on 8 August.

Although he started the 2024–25 season making most of his appearances from the bench, he scored two stoppage-time goals after coming on as an 82nd-minute substitute in a 2–1 home win over Brentford on 4 November 2024. The first goal of his brace saw him awarded Premier League Goal of the Month for November.

=== Leeds United ===
On 8 July 2026, Wilson joined Leeds United on a free transfer.

== International career ==
Having represented Wales in the Victory Shield and at under-17 level and impressing manager Chris Coleman with his performances, in October 2013, Wilson was called up by the Wales national football team at the age of 16. An unused substitute in a 1–0 victory over Macedonia on 11 October, Wilson made his debut four days later against Belgium, when he came on as a substitute for Hal Robson-Kanu in the 87th minute. Upon making this appearance he became the youngest player at the age of 16 years and 207 days, to play for Wales, beating the previous record holder Gareth Bale by 108 days. He also became Liverpool's youngest international beating the record previously held by Raheem Sterling who represented England for the first time in November 2012 at the age of 17 years and 342 days. He was praised by Coleman, who said: "Now he has had a little taste of it, that cements his future with Wales for the next 10 or 15 years"; the manager also spoke of England's interest in the player. Wilson's maternal grandfather Peter Edwards earned around £125,000 after placing a £50 bet with William Hill on his grandson becoming an international footballer, when he was aged just 18 months.

In June 2015, Wilson again joined up with the senior Welsh squad for a post-season training camp in Cardiff. On 20 March 2017, he replaced the injured Tom Lawrence in the Wales squad for the World Cup qualifier against the Republic of Ireland.

Wilson was included in Wales' squad for the China Cup in March 2018. On his first international start, against hosts China, he scored his first goal in a 6–0 semi-final win. The game was also on his 21st birthday. On 16 October that year, Wales travelled to play the Republic of Ireland in the UEFA Nations League without Bale and Aaron Ramsey, and Wilson scored the only goal with a long-range free kick similar to his recent one for Derby against Manchester United; Wales manager Ryan Giggs, formerly of United, joked that "I thought about fining him after he scored at Old Trafford but I won't be fining him now". In May 2021, he was selected for the Wales squad for the delayed UEFA Euro 2020 tournament. In November 2022, he was named in the Wales squad for the 2022 FIFA World Cup in Qatar, in which he appeared in all three of Wales' games. On 18 November 2025, Wilson scored a hat-trick in a historic 7–1 win against North Macedonia in Wales' final 2026 FIFA World Cup qualifying match, securing second place in Group J.

== Career statistics ==
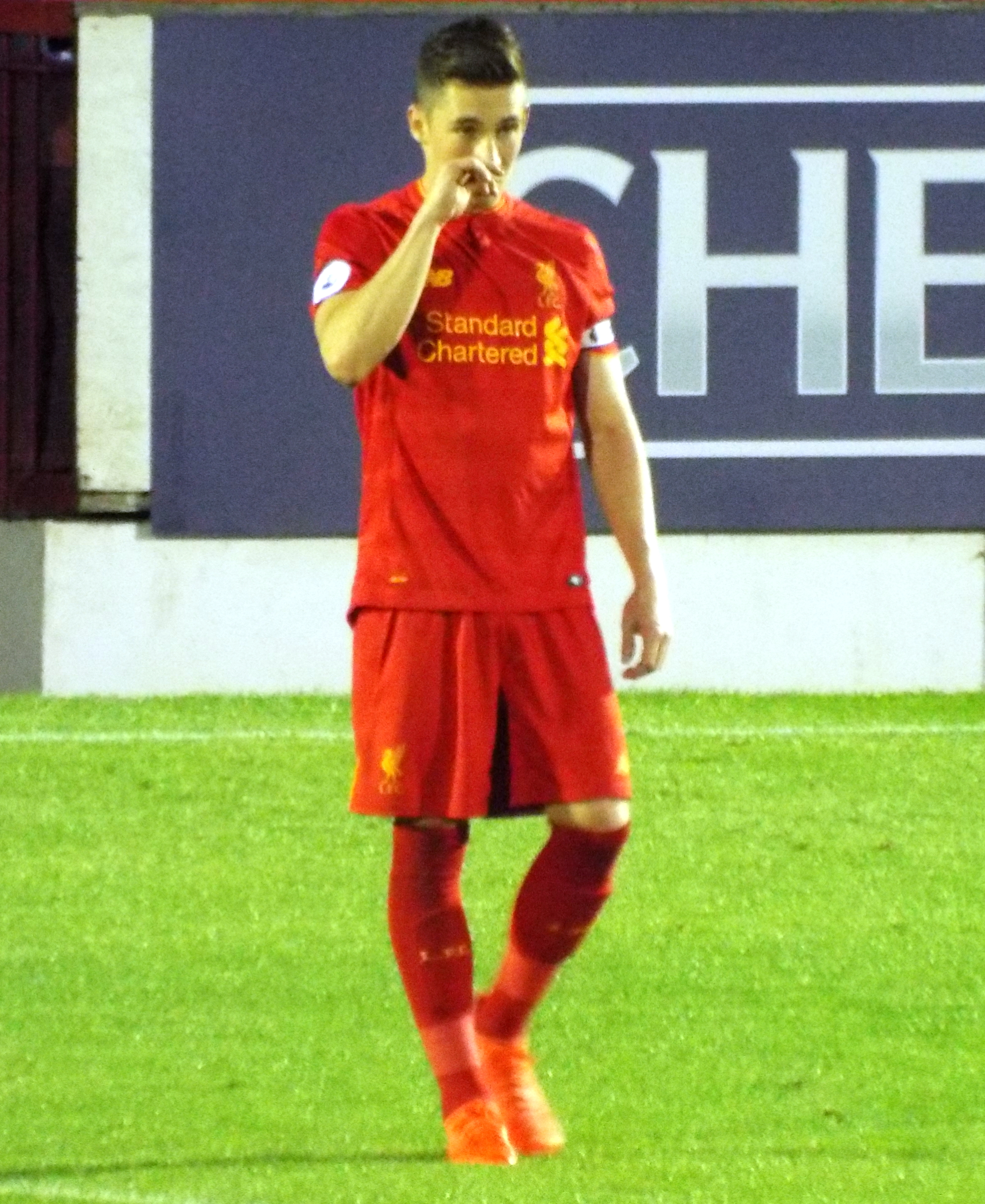
Wilson playing for Liverpool in 2016

=== Club ===
As of match played 5 September 2026

Appearances and goals by club, season and competition
Clubs	Season	League			FA Cup		EFL Cup		Other		Total	
Clubs	Season	Division	Apps	Goals	Apps	Goals	Apps	Goals	Apps	Goals	Apps	Goals
Liverpool	2015–16	Premier League	0	0	0	0	0	0	0	0	0	0
Liverpool	2016–17	Premier League	0	0	1	0	0	0	—		1	0
Liverpool	2020–21	Premier League	0	0	—		1	0	0	0	1	0
Liverpool	Total		0	0	1	0	1	0	0	0	2	0
Crewe Alexandra (loan)	2015–16	League One	7	0	0	0	—		—		7	0
Hull City (loan)	2017–18	Championship	13	7	1	0	—		—		14	7
Derby County (loan)	2018–19	Championship	40	15	3	1	3	1	3 (Note: Appearances in Championship play-offs)	1	49	18
Bournemouth (loan)	2019–20	Premier League	31	7	2	0	2	0	—		35	7
Cardiff City (loan)	2020–21	Championship	37	7	1	0	—		—		38	7
Fulham (loan)	2021–22	Championship	41	10	2	1	0	0	—		43	11
Fulham	2022–23	Premier League	29	2	4	1	0	0	—		33	3
Fulham	2023–24	Premier League	35	4	2	0	6	1	—		43	5
Fulham	2024–25	Premier League	25	6	0	0	2	0	—		27	6
Fulham	2025–26	Premier League	36	10	2	1	3	0	—		41	11
Fulham	Fulham total		166	32	10	3	11	1	0	0	187	36
Leeds United	2026–27	Premier League	3	0	0	0	1	0	—		4	0
Career total			297	68	18	4	18	2	3	1	336	75

=== International ===
As of match played 17 November 2026

Appearances and goals by national team and year
National team	Year	Apps	Goals
Wales	2013	1	0
Wales	2014	0	0
Wales	2015	0	0
Wales	2016	0	0
Wales	2017	0	0
Wales	2018	7	2
Wales	2019	9	1
Wales	2020	5	1
Wales	2021	12	1
Wales	2022	8	0
Wales	2023	10	3
Wales	2024	8	4
Wales	2025	7	5
Wales	2026	4	0
Total		71	17

As of match played 18 November 2025. Wales' score listed first, score column indicates score after each Wilson goal.

List of international goals scored by Harry Wilson
No.	Date	Venue	Cap	Opponent	Score	Result	Competition	Ref.
1	22 March 2018	Guangxi Sports Center, Nanning, China	2	China	4–0	6–0	2018 China Cup	
2	16 October 2018	Aviva Stadium, Dublin, Ireland	6	Republic of Ireland	1–0	1–0	2018–19 UEFA Nations League B	
3	16 November 2019	Bakcell Arena, Baku, Azerbaijan	16	Azerbaijan	2–0	2–0	UEFA Euro 2020 qualification	
4	18 November 2020	Cardiff City Stadium, Cardiff, Wales	21	Finland	1–0	3–1	2020–21 UEFA Nations League B	
5	24 March 2021	Den Dreef, Leuven, Belgium	23	Belgium	1–0	1–3	2022 FIFA World Cup qualification	
6	16 June 2023	Cardiff City Stadium, Cardiff, Wales	45	Armenia	2–3	2–4	UEFA Euro 2024 qualification	
7	15 October 2023	Cardiff City Stadium, Cardiff, Wales	50	Croatia	1–0	2–1	UEFA Euro 2024 qualification	
8	15 October 2023	Cardiff City Stadium, Cardiff, Wales	50	Croatia	2–0	2–1	UEFA Euro 2024 qualification	
9	9 September 2024	Gradski Stadion, Nikšić, Montenegro	56	Montenegro	2–0	2–1	2024–25 UEFA Nations League B	
10	11 October 2024	Laugardalsvöllur Stadium, Reykjavík, Iceland	57	Iceland	2–0	2–2	2024–25 UEFA Nations League B	
11	14 October 2024	Cardiff City Stadium, Cardiff, Wales	58	Montenegro	1–0	1–0	2024–25 UEFA Nations League B	
12	19 November 2024	Cardiff City Stadium, Cardiff, Wales	60	Iceland	4–1	4–1	2024–25 UEFA Nations League B	
13	6 June 2025	Cardiff City Stadium, Cardiff, Wales	61	Liechtenstein	2–0	3–0	2026 FIFA World Cup qualification	
14	9 June 2025	King Baudouin Stadium, Brussels, Belgium	62	Belgium	1–3	3–4	2026 FIFA World Cup qualification	
15	18 November 2025	Cardiff City Stadium, Cardiff, Wales	67	North Macedonia	1–0	7–1	2026 FIFA World Cup qualification	
16	18 November 2025	Cardiff City Stadium, Cardiff, Wales	67	North Macedonia	5–1	7–1	2026 FIFA World Cup qualification	
17	18 November 2025	Cardiff City Stadium, Cardiff, Wales	67	North Macedonia	6–1	7–1	2026 FIFA World Cup qualification	

== Honours ==
Fulham

- EFL Championship: 2021–22

Wales

- China Cup runner-up: 2018

Individual

- EFL Championship PFA Player of the Month: April 2018
- EFL Championship Team of the Season: 2021–22
- PFA Team of the Year: 2021–22 Championship
- Premier League Goal of the Month: November 2024, December 2025
- BBC Goal of the Month: August 2019, December 2025 (Note: Retroactive winner. Dominic Calvert-Lewin had won the award, but by the time for voting of the BBC Goal of the Season, his goal was replaced with Wilson's for unclear reasons. Wilson finished in third place behind Calvin-Lewin and Aston Villa's Morgan Rogers with 23.92% of the vote.)
- BBC Goal of the Season: 2025–26
- Liverpool Academy Player of the Season: 2017–18
- Fulham Player of the Year: 2026
