= List of schools in Denbighshire =

This is a list of schools in Denbighshire in Wales.

== Primary schools ==
- Bodnant Community School
- Christchurch School
- Christ The Word School
- Rhos Street School
- St Asaph Infant School
- St Brigid's School
- Ysgol Betws Gwerfil Goch
- Ysgol Bodfari
- Ysgol Borthyn
- Ysgol Bro Cinmeirch
- Ysgol Bro Dyfrdwy (Cynwyd)
- Ysgol Bro Dyfrdwy (Llandrillo)
- Ysgol Bro Elwern
- Ysgol Bro Fammau (Llanarmon)
- Ysgol Bro Fammau (Llanferres)
- Ysgol Bryn Clwyd
- Ysgol Bryn Collen
- Ysgol Bryn Hedydd
- Ysgol Caer Drewyn
- Ysgol Carrog
- Ysgol Cefn Meiriadog
- Ysgol Clawdd Offa
- Ysgol Clocaenog
- Ysgol Cyffylliog
- Ysgol Dewi Sant y Rhyl
- Ysgol Dyffryn Iâl (Bryneglwys)
- Ysgol Dyffryn Iâl (Llandegla)
- Ysgol Emmanuel
- Ysgol Esgob Morgan
- Ysgol Frongoch
- Ysgol Gellifor
- Ysgol Gymraeg y Gwernant
- Ysgol Henllan
- Ysgol Hiraddug
- Ysgol Llanbedr
- Ysgol Llanfair D.C.
- Ysgol Llywelyn
- Ysgol Mair
- Ysgol Melyd
- Ysgol Pant Pastynog
- Ysgol Pen Barras
- Ysgol Pendref
- Ysgol Penmorfa
- Ysgol Pentrecelyn
- Ysgol Rhewl
- Ysgol Trefnant
- Ysgol Tremeirchion
- Ysgol Twm o'r Nant
- Ysgol Y Faenol
- Ysgol Y Llys
- Ysgol Y Parc

== Secondary schools ==
- Blessed Edward Jones Catholic High School*
- Denbigh High School, Denbigh
- Prestatyn High School
- Rhyl High School*
- St Brigid's School
- Ysgol Brynhyfryd
- Ysgol Dinas Brân
- Ysgol Glan Clwyd

* Secondary schools with no Sixth Form

== Special schools ==
- Tir Morfa School
- Ysgol Plas Brondyffryn

== Independent schools ==
- Fairholme School
- Ruthin School
- Myddelton College
