= Matthew Nicklin =

British judge

The Honourable Mr Justice Nicklin FRSA
- Royal coat of arms of the United Kingdom

Justice of the High Court
- Incumbent
- Assumed office 2 October 2017
- Monarch: Charles III

Personal details
- Born: 1970 (age 55–56) Oxford, England
- Education: Newcastle University

Sir Matthew James Nicklin (born 1970) is an English High Court judge.

Nicklin was born in Oxford, England. He was educated at Tasker Milward Voluntary Controlled School in Haverfordwest. In 1992, he took a first in law from Newcastle University.

Nicklin was called to the bar at Lincoln's Inn in 1993 and practised from 1996, specialising in privacy and defamation law. In addition to practice, he wrote The Law of Privacy and the Media in 2002 which was taken into a third edition.

He served as a recorder from 2009 to 2017 and took silk in 2013. He was joint-head of chambers at 5RB from 2014 to 2017. He was a member of the Bar Standards Board from 2007 to 2013. In 2010, he was elected a Fellow of the Royal Society of Arts. He is on Newcastle Law School's advisory board.

On 2 October 2017, Nicklin was appointed a judge of the High Court and assigned to the Queen's Bench Division. He took the customary knighthood in the same year. Since February 2021, he has been Judge in Charge of the Media and Communications List.

On 22 July 2021, Nicklin presided over the Jamal Hijazi v Stephen Yaxley-Lennon case.

In August 2026, Nicklin ordered seven well known public figures, including Prince Harry, who had lost their privacy case in July against Associated Newspapers Limited (ANL) to pay the publishers ANL, by 28 August, an interim £9.54m payment towards their legal costs, with a potential liability of up to £34.5m payable to ANL, once the costs have been fully assessed.
