= Whitmore High School, Barry =

Whitmore High School

Location
- Port Road West; Barry, Vale of Glamorgan, CF62 8ZJ; Wales
- Coordinates: 51°24′55″N 3°17′16″W

Information
- Motto: Opportunity to Succeed
- Established: 2018
- Local authority: The Vale of Glamorgan
- Specialist: Andrew Prickett
- Department for Education URN: 402422 Tables
- Ofsted: Reports
- Head of school: Innes Robinson
- Gender: Co-educational
- Age: 10 to 19
- Website: www.whitmorehigh.org

Whitmore High School is a co-educational secondary school situated in Barry, Wales, on the site of the former Barry Comprehensive School.

== History ==
Whitmore High School was formed in September 2018 during a reform of secondary education in the area, when the single-sex Bryn Hafren Comprehensive School and Barry Comprehensive School became co-educational schools. Whitmore High School was based out of the Barry Comprehensive School site.

In 2018, plans to build a new building for the school were announced, with construction started in September 2019. This was part of the Welsh Government's 21st Century Schools Programme. Staff and students moved into the new school building in May 2021.
