= List of schools in Merthyr Tydfil County Borough =

This is a list of schools in Merthyr Tydfil in Wales.

== English-medium primary schools ==
- Abercanaid Community School
- Bedlinog Community Primary School
- Brecon Road Infants School
- Caedraw Primary School
- Cyfarthfa Junior School
- Dowlais Primary School
- Edwardsville Primary School
- Gellifaelog Primary School
- Goetre Primary School
- Gwaunfarren Primary School
- Heolgerrig Community School
- Pantysgallog Primary School
- St Aloysius RC Primary School
- St Illtyd’s RC Primary School
- St Mary's RC Primary School
- Trelewis Primary School
- Troedyhriw Primary School
- Twynyrodyn Community School
- Ynysowen Community Primary School
- Ysgol Gynradd Coed y Dderwen
- Ysgol y Graig Primary

== Welsh-medium primary schools ==
- Ysgol Gynradd Gymraeg Rhyd-y-Grug
- Ysgol Gynradd Gymraeg Santes Tudful

== English-medium secondary schools ==
- Afon Tâf High School
- Bishop Hedley High School
- Cyfarthfa High School
- Pen y Dre High School

As of 2019, there was no Welsh-medium secondary school in the borough. Many Welsh-speaking pupils attend Ysgol Gyfun Rhydywaun near Aberdare in Rhondda Cynon Taf.

== Special school ==
- Greenfield Special School
