= Mason Grady =

Welsh rugby union player (born 2002)

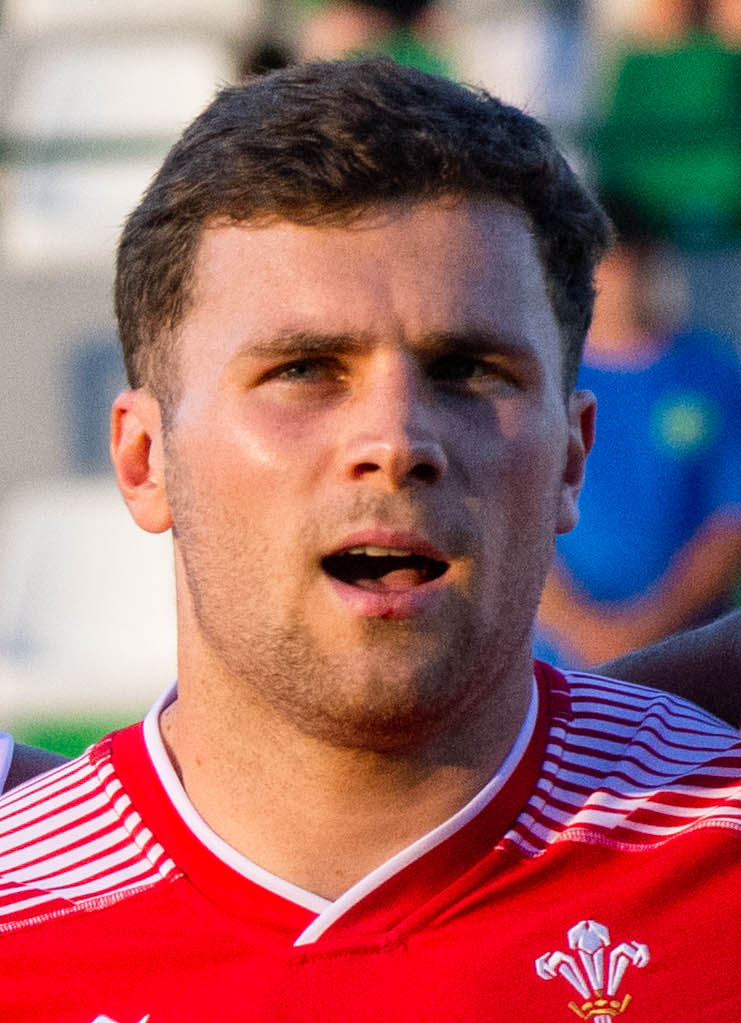
- Grady representing Wales U20 during the 2022 Six Nations Under 20s Championship
- Born: 29 March 2002 (age 24) Cardiff, Wales
- Height: 1.96 m (6 ft 5 in)
- Weight: 112 kg (247 lb; 17 st 9 lb)
- School: Ysgol Gymraeg Bro Morgannwg
- Notable relative: Cory Allen (brother)

Rugby union career
- Position(s): Centre, Wing
- Current team: Cardiff
Senior career
Years	Team	Apps	(Points)
2020–	Cardiff	57	(75)
International career
Years	Team	Apps	(Points)
2020–2022	Wales U20	8	(5)
2023–	Wales	17	(5)

Mason Grady (born 29 March 2002) is a Welsh professional rugby union player who plays as a centre for United Rugby Championship club Cardiff and the Wales national team.

== Club career ==
=== Cardiff ===
Grady signed his first professional contract for Cardiff in September 2020. Grady played in the Welsh Premier Division for both Cardiff RFC and Pontypridd RFC. On his Cardiff debut, he became the second youngest player to represent the club, at 17 years and seven months. He was part of the Cardiff RFC team which won the 2021–22 Indigo Group Premiership.

He made his Cardiff Blues debut in Round 8 of the 2020–21 Pro14 against Glasgow Warriors. Near the end of the season, Grady suffered a serious knee injury, which ultimately ruled him out for a year. Grady began to feature more prominently for Cardiff in the 2022–23 season, following his recovery from the injury. He scored in back to back European fixtures, against Brive and Newcastle, as Cardiff made the knockouts of the 2022–23 Challenge Cup.

Grady signed a contract extension with Cardiff at the end of the 2023–24 season. On 22 January 2025, Grady signed a further extension with Cardiff.

Grady suffered an injury in a preseason friendly against Richmond, his first appearance since his ankle injury the previous autumn.

== International career ==
=== Wales U18 and U20 ===
Grady has represented Wales U18 and Wales U20. He was selected for Wales U20 while still eligible for the U18 side, playing in the 2020 Six Nations Under 20s Championship, until the tournament was postponed due to the COVID-19 pandemic. Due to injury, Grady did not participate in the 2022 Six Nations Under 20s Championship. Upon returning to fitness, Grady was selected for the 2022 U20 Summer Series. He scored a try against South Africa U20 in the final.

=== Wales ===
On 3 November 2022, Grady was called up by Wales to train with the squad ahead of the Autumn Nations Series.

On 17 January 2023, Grady was called up by Wales again, for the 2023 Six Nations squad. He made his debut on 25 February 2023, starting at outside centre against England.

Grady was selected for the Wales training squad ahead of the 2023 Rugby World Cup, and came off the bench in the first warm-up match, a win over England.

Grady scored his first try for Wales during the 2024 Six Nations Championship in the final match against Italy.

For the 2024 Wales rugby union tour of Australia, Grady was moved to the unfamiliar position of inside centre, starting there in the friendly against South Africa and the two tour tests against Australia.

Grady moved to the wing for the first fixture of the 2024 end-of-year rugby union internationals, but was injured early on in the opening match, and subsequently ruled out for the remainder of the series.

Grady was named in the squad for the 2026 Six Nations by Steve Tandy. He came off the bench against France and scored a try.

== Personal life ==
Grady comes from an athletic family: Julie, his mother, played basketball for the Rhondda Rebels, and represented Wales in the Commonwealth Games. His brother Ashton has also represented Wales in basketball, while his older brother, Cory Allen, is a retired Welsh international, and also played as a centre. Grady himself played basketball, representing Wales U16.

Grady attended Ysgol Gymraeg Bro Morgannwg.
