= List of schools in Rhondda Cynon Taf =

This is a list of schools in Rhondda Cynon Taf in Wales.

== Primary schools ==
- Abercynon Community Primary School
- Aberdare Park Primary School
- Aberdare Town CW Primary School
- Abernant County Primary School
- Alaw Primary School
- Blaengwawr Primary School
- Bodringallt Primary School
- Brynnau Primary School
- Caegarw Primary School
- Capcoch Primary School
- Caradog Primary School
- Cefn Primary School
- Coedpenmaen County Primary School
- Craig Yr Hesg Primary School
- Cwmaman Infants School
- Cwmbach CW Primary School
- Cwmbach Primary School
- Cwmclydach Primary School
- Cwmdar Primary School
- Cwmlai Primary School
- Cymmer Primary School
- Darran Park Primary School
- Darrenlas Primary School
- Dolau Primary School
- Ffynnon Taf Primary School
- Gelli Primary School
- Glenboi Community Primary School
- Gwauncelyn Primary School
- Gwaunmeisgyn Primary School
- Hafod Primary School
- Hendreforgan Community Primary School
- Hirwaun Primary School
- Llanharan Primary School
- Llanhari Primary School
- Llanilltud Faerdref Primary School
- Llantrisant Primary School
- Llwydcoed Primary School
- Llwyncrwn Primary School
- Llwynypia Primary School
- Maerdy Community Primary School
- Maesybryn Primary School
- Maesycoed Primary School
- Miskin Primary School
- Oaklands Primary School
- Our Lady's RC Primary School
- Parc Lewis Primary School
- Parc Primary School
- Pengeulan Primary School
- Penpych Community Primary School
- Penrhiwceiber Primary School
- Penrhys Primary School
- Penygawsi Primary School
- Penyrenglyn Community Primary School
- Penywaun Primary School
- Perthcelyn Community Primary School
- Pontrhondda Primary School
- Pontyclun Primary School
- Pontygwaith Primary School
- SS Gabriel & Raphael RC Primary School
- St Margaret's Catholic Primary School
- St Michael's Primary School
- Ton Pentre Infants School
- Ton Pentre Junior School
- Tonysguboriau Primary School
- Trallwng Infants School
- Trealaw Primary School
- Tref y Rhyg Primary School
- Trehopcyn Primary School
- Treorchy Primary School
- Trerobart Primary School
- Tylorstown Primary School
- Williamstown Primary School
- Ynysboeth Primary School
- Ynyshir Primary School
- Ysgol Gynradd Gymraeg Awel Taf
- Ysgol Gynradd Gymraeg Abercynon
- Ysgol Gynradd Gymraeg Aberdar
- Ysgol Gynradd Gymraeg Bodringallt
- Ysgol Gynradd Gymraeg Bronllwyn
- Ysgol Gynradd Gymraeg Castellau
- Ysgol Gynradd Dolau
- Ysgol Gynradd Gymraeg Evan James
- Ysgol Gynradd Gymunedol Gymraeg Llantrisant
- Ysgol Gynradd Gymraeg Llwyncelyn
- Ysgol Gynradd Gymraeg Llyn-y-Forwyn
- Ysgol Gynradd Gymraeg Penderyn
- Ysgol Gynradd Gymraeg Tonyrefail
- Ysgol Gynradd Gymraeg Ynyswen

== All through schools ==
- Ysgol Afon Wen (English medium)
- Ysgol Bro Taf (English medium)
- Ysgol Garth Olwg (Welsh medium)
- Ysgol Llanhari (Welsh medium)
- Ysgol Nant-gwyn (English medium)
- Porth Community School
- Tonyrefail Community School

== Secondary schools ==
- Aberdare Community School
- Bryncelynnog Comprehensive School
- Cardinal Newman R.C Comprehensive
- Ferndale Community School
- Mountain Ash Comprehensive
- St. John Baptist C.I.W High School
- Treorchy Comprehensive School
- Y Pant Comprehensive School
- Ysgol Gyfun Rhydywaun
- Ysgol Gyfun Cwm Rhondda

== Special Educational Needs provision ==
- Maesgwyn Special School
- Park Lane Special School
- Ysgol Hen Felin
- Ysgol Ty Coch

== Welsh medium primary schools ==
- Ysgol Dolau (dual stream)
- Ysgol Gynradd Gymraeg Abercynon
- Ysgol Gynradd Gymraeg Aberdar
- Ysgol Gynradd Gymraeg Bodringallt
- Ysgol Gynradd Gymraeg Bronllwyn
- Ysgol Gynradd Gymraeg Castellau
- Ysgol Gynradd Gymraeg Evan James
- Ysgol Gynradd Gymraeg Garth Olwg
- Ysgol Gynradd Gymraeg Llwyncelyn
- Ysgol Gynradd Gymraeg Llyn-y-Forwyn
- Ysgol Gynradd Gymraeg Pont Sion Norton
- Ysgol Gynradd Gymraeg Tonyrefail
- Ysgol Gynradd Gymraeg Ynyswen
- Ysgol Gynradd Gymunedol Gymraeg Llantrisant
- Ysgol Llanhari

== Secondary schools ==
- Aberdare Girls' School
- Aberdare High School
- Blaengwawr Comprehensive School
- Bryn Celynnog Comprehensive School
- Cardinal Newman RC School
- Ferndale Community School
- Hawthorn High School
- Mountain Ash Comprehensive School
- Pontypridd High School
- Porth County Comprehensive School
- St. John the Baptist School
- Tonypandy Comprehensive School
- Tonyrefail School
- Treorchy Comprehensive School
- Y Pant School

== Welsh medium secondary schools ==
- Ysgol Gyfun Cymer Rhondda
- Ysgol Gyfun Garth Olwg
- Ysgol Gyfun Llanhari
- Ysgol Gyfun Rhydywaun

== Special schools ==
- Maesgwyn Special School
- Park Lane Special School
- Ysgol Hen Felin
- Ysgol Ty Coch

== Further and higher education establishments ==
- Coleg Y Cymoedd
- University of South Wales
