= Penley =

Village in Wales

Coordinates: 52.953°N 2.871°W

Penley: Welsh: Llannerch Banna
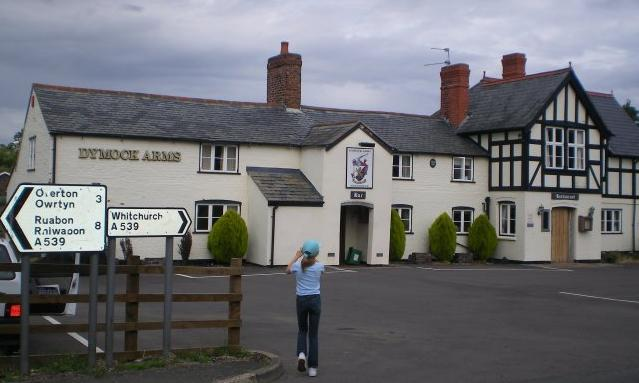
- The Dymock Arms public house in Penley

- Location within Wrexham
- Population: 606
- OS grid reference: SJ414399
- Community: Maelor South
- Principal area: Wrexham
- Country: Wales
- Sovereign state: United Kingdom
- Post town: WREXHAM
- Postcode district: LL13
- Dialling code: 01948
- Police: North Wales
- Fire: North Wales
- Ambulance: Welsh
- UK Parliament: Wrexham
- Senedd Cymru – Welsh Parliament: Clwyd South

Penley (Welsh: Llannerch Banna) is a village in the County Borough of Wrexham, in Wales close to the border with Shropshire, England, and had a population of 606 as of the 2011 census.

The village was, until 1974, in an exclave of the ancient county of Flintshire known as Maelor Saesneg. (English: "English Maelor"), sometimes called "Flintshire Detached", which was administered from Overton-on-Dee. Between 1974 and 1996, Penley was in the short-lived county of Clwyd.

Penley lies on the path of the long-distance walk, the Maelor Way.

== Church and parish history ==
Penley Church was originally built in 1538. The timber structure was replaced by a brick one in 1793. This was demolished in 1893, and the current church was completed in 1899; it was consecrated in 1902, and dedicated to Mary Magdalene.

Penley was originally part of the parish of Ellesmere in neighbouring Shropshire, but it became a separate parish towards the end of the Commonwealth period. In early 1661, it reverted to being part of the parish of Ellesmere, after the Restoration of Charles II. In 1860, it again became a separate parish.

It was then in the English Diocese of Lichfield until 1920, when following the disestablishment and disendowment of the Church in Wales, it was transferred to the Welsh Diocese of St Asaph, where it remains.

Penley was home to the Penley Community Hospital, which cared for Polish ex-servicemen who settled in the area. It closed in 2002.

== Schools ==
Penley has one primary school and one secondary school. The primary school, known as the Madras School, was built in 1811 by George Kenyon II, Baron Kenyon of Gredington. Penley's secondary school, The Maelor School, was built in 1957 and serves the rural communities on both sides of the border. It has had excellent GCSE results over the last few years with a high percentage of pupils getting A*s; it was awarded the title of the "most improved secondary school in North Wales" from the Curriculum Authority for Wales in 2006.
