= J. P. Stern =

Czech-born British literary theorist (1920-1991)

Joseph Peter Maria Stern, FBA (25 December 1920 – 18 November 1991) was a Czech-born British literary theorist and an authority on German literature.

== Biography ==
Born into a Jewish family in Prague, Czechoslovakia, he was educated in Prague, Vienna, at Barry County School in Glamorgan and at St. John's College, Cambridge, where he took his M.A. in 1947. During the war, he served in the Czechoslovak army in exile. He took up a lectureship at Bedford College, London, and then at Cambridge University in 1952, returning to St. John's.

He was Professor of German at University College London from 1972 to 1986. A prolific scholar of nineteenth- and twentieth-century German literature, he wrote on Nietzsche, Kafka, Jünger, Rilke and Mann, and edited the series Landmarks in World Literature. One of his most influential works was On Realism (1973). He was also known for his study Hitler: The Führer and the People, which was translated into several languages.

He married Sheila McMullan (23 June 1922 – 16 November 2005) in 1944, having met her as a student in 1940.

He died in Cambridge on 18 November 1991 and was cremated on 25 November 1991 at Cambridge Crematorium, and his ashes were interred at the Parish of the Ascension Burial Ground in Cambridge. His wife's ashes, following her cremation on 29 November 2005, are also interred there.

== Works ==
- Leibniz and the Seventeenth-Century Revolution by R. W. Meyer (1952) (translator)
- Ernst Jünger: A Writer of Our Time (1953)
- Lichtenberg: A Doctrine of Scattered Occasions, Reconstructed from His Aphorisms and Reflections, Indiana University Press (1959).
- Re-interpretations: Seven Studies in Nineteenth-Century German Literature (1964)
- Liebelei/Leutnant Gustl/Die Letzten Masken by Arthur Schnitzler (1966) (editor)
- Thomas Mann (1967)
- Idylls & Realities: Studies in Nineteenth-Century German Literature (1971) (editor)
- On Realism (1973)
- Hitler: the Führer and the people (1975)
- Nietzsche (Fontana Modern Masters, 1978)
- Nietzsche: His Life, Work, Writings and Ideas (1978)
- A Study of Nietzsche (1979)
- The World of Franz Kafka (1980) (editor)
- Nietzsche on Tragedy (1981) (with M. S. Silk)
- Nietzsche: Die Moralität der äußeren Anstrengung (1982)
- Paths and Labyrinths: Nine Papers read at a Kafka Symposium (1985) (editor with J. J. White)
- The Heart of Europe: Essays on Literature and Ideology (1992)
- The Dear Purchase: A Theme in German Modernism (1995)
