= List of schools in Wrexham County Borough =

This is a list of schools in Wrexham County Borough in Wales.

== English medium primary schools ==
- Acrefair Community Primary School
- Acton Park Community Primary School
- Alexandra Community Primary School
- All Saints VA Primary School
- Bangor on Dee Community Primary School
- Barker's Lane Community Primary School
- Black Lane Community Primary School
- Borderbrook School
- Borras Park Infant School
- Borras Park Junior School
- Bronington VA Primary School
- Brynteg Community Primary School
- Bwlchgwyn Community Primary School
- Cefn Mawr Community Primary School
- Eyton VC Primary School
- Froncysyllte Community Primary School
- Garth Community Primary School
- Gwenfro Community Primary School
- Gwersyllt Community Primary School
- Hafod y Wern Community Primary School
- Holt Community Primary School
- Johnstown Infant School
- Johnstown Junior School
- Llanarmon Dyffryn Ceiriog School
- Madras VA Primary School
- Minera VA School
- Park Community Primary School
- Pentre VC Primary School
- Penygelli Community Primary School
- Penycae Community Primary School
- Pontfadog Community Primary School
- Rhosddu Primary School
- Rhostyllen Community Primary School
- Rhosymedre Community Primary School
- The Rofft Community Primary School
- St Anne's RC Primary School
- St Chad's CW VA Primary School
- St Giles VC CW Primary School
- St Mary's Aided School, Brymbo
- St Mary's CW Primary School, Ruabon
- St Mary's RC Primary School, Wrexham
- St Mary's VA School, Overton on Dee
- St Paul's VA Primary School
- St Peter's VC Primary School
- Southsea Community Primary School
- Victoria Primary School
- Wat's Dyke Community Primary School
- Ysgol Deiniol
- Ysgol Heulfan
- Ysgol Maes y Llan
- Ysgol Maes y Mynydd
- Ysgol Penrhyn
- Ysgol y Waun

== Welsh medium primary schools ==
- Ysgol Bodhyfryd
- Ysgol Bryn Tabor
- Ysgol Cynddelw (Dual language)
- Ysgol I.D. Hooson
- Ysgol Min y Ddol
- Ysgol Plas Coch
- Ysgol Bro Alun

== English medium secondary schools ==
- The Maelor School
- Darland High School
- Rhosnesni High School
- St Joseph's Catholic & Anglican High School
- Ysgol Bryn Alyn
- Ysgol Clywedog
- Ysgol Rhiwabon
- Ysgol y Grango

== Welsh medium secondary schools ==
- Ysgol Morgan Llwyd

== Special schools ==
- St Christopher's School
