= Thomas Young (rugby union) =

Wales international rugby union player (born 1992)

- Born: Thomas Young; 18 May 1989 (age 37) Merthyr Tydfil, Wales
- Height: 1.80 m (5 ft 11 in)
- Weight: 104 kg (16 st 5 lb)

Rugby union career
- Position: Openside Flanker
Amateur team(s)
Years	Team	Apps	(Points)
- Cardiff RFC
–	Pontypridd RFC		
Senior career
Years	Team	Apps	(Points)
2011–2014	Cardiff Blues	10	(0)
2014	Gloucester	3	(0)
2014–2022	Wasps	146	(170)
2022–2025	Cardiff Rugby	45	(85)
2025-	Dragons RFC	19	(10)
- Correct as of 13 August 2026
International career
Years	Team	Apps	(Points)
2011–2012	Wales U20	7	(10)
2017-2022	Wales	4	(0)
- Correct as of 13 August 2026

Thomas Young (born 18 May 1992) is a Welsh international rugby union player. He is a flanker, who plays for Dragons RFC.

== Early life and education ==
Thomas Young is the son of former Wales international and former Wasps director of rugby Dai Young. He attended Ysgol Gyfun Rhydywaun.

== Career ==
On 24 January 2014, Young was released early by Cardiff Blues as he signed a short-term deal to join Gloucester Rugby until the end of the 2013/14 season. On 13 May 2014, Thomas was signed to Wasps from the 2014–15 season, reuniting with his father, who was the Director of Rugby.

On 16 January 2017 Young was called up to the Wales Squad for the 2017 Six Nations Championship. In May 2017 he was named in the Wales senior squad for the tests against Tonga and Samoa in June 2017

On the 13 October 2021, Young and Cardiff Rugby confirmed that he will play for the URC team from the 2022–2023 season onwards.

On 2 April 2025, Young left Cardiff again to join regional rivals Dragons from the 2025-26 season.
