= List of historical medical schools in the United Kingdom =

This list of historical medical schools in the United Kingdom includes all those that were once part of medical education in the United Kingdom, but are now either no longer under the UK's authority or no longer exist. This includes schools in Ireland, previously part of the United Kingdom, that are now part of the Irish education system.

== England ==
=== London ===
Most of the teaching hospitals in London were founded centuries before the University of London. Their students qualified with diplomas from the Royal College of Surgeons and/or the Worshipful Society of Apothecaries, and latterly (until 1999) the Conjoint diplomas of MRCS, LRCP. When London University degrees became available, the other diplomas were often attempted first.

Until recent decades, most of the pre-clinical output of the Oxford and Cambridge universities went to the London teaching hospitals: they could return to their original universities to take their medical degrees, or take the London qualifications. Small numbers went elsewhere in the UK, e.g. to the University of Edinburgh, and rarely further afield, such as to Harvard University.

Before medical education became systematically ordered in the 19th century, it was possible to count attendance at a London teaching hospital towards an Edinburgh or Glasgow degree.

=== Provincial ===
The Durham University School of Medicine, Pharmacy and Health operated at Durham University's Queen's Campus in Stockton-on-Tees from 2001 to 2017, when it was transferred to Newcastle University.

== Ireland ==
=== Dublin ===
The Catholic University of Ireland's School of Medicine was set up in Dublin under British rule in 1855. The university's qualifications were not recognised by the state, but the medical students were able to take the licentiate examinations of the Royal College of Surgeons in Ireland, which still runs the last surviving non-university medical school in the British Isles. The Catholic University's school became independent in 1892 and in 1909 became part of University College, Dublin, and its students thereafter took the MB BCh BAO degrees of the National University of Ireland.

== Scotland ==
=== Edinburgh ===
In Edinburgh, students accumulated "duly performed" certificates from classes and clinics to become eligible to take the examinations. For the university exams, at least half of the classes had to be in the university, but the rest could be from teachers recognised by the Royal Colleges (a kind of Privatdozent system, as this could be a stepping stone to a university post) in the 19th century. A number of small private anatomy schools and medical schools were collectively known as the Edinburgh Extramural School of Medicine. Both university and extramural students could qualify with the Triple Qualification, the licentiate exams of the Royal Colleges of Physicians and Surgeons.

In the late 19th century the Edinburgh School of Medicine for Women taught students at Surgeons' Square with clinical teaching at Leith Hospital. The Edinburgh College of Medicine for Women operated at 31 Chambers Street from 1889 until it merged with the Royal Colleges School of Medicine in 1916.

Polish School of Medicine (Polish Medical Faculty) at the University of Edinburgh

The Polish School of Medicine operated in Edinburgh from 1941 to 1949, originally to provide doctors for the Polish Army Corps which had been evacuated to Britain after the fall of France in World War II. At first it enabled medical students from the Polish universities, which had all been closed by the German administration, to complete their courses and qualify. Instruction and examination were mostly in Polish. As well as the University's facilities, the Paderewski Hospital was set up on the Western General Hospital site. It was not feasible to move the school as a unit to Poland after the liberation. The school was both a faculty of the University of Edinburgh and a university authorised by the Polish government in exile (in London), and the Dean also had the powers of a Polish Rector Magnificus. Of 337 students enrolled, 227 graduated, 38 transferred to British universities and 71 discontinued their studies. The school awarded both British degrees of Bachelor of Medicine and Bachelor of Surgery and a Polish Dyplom Lekarza on the same bilingual Latin-Polish certificate. Nineteen progressed to Doctor of Medicine (MD).

=== Glasgow ===
The Glasgow Medical School had an extramural component similar to that of the University of Edinburgh.

Anderson's University/College (the non degree-granting precursor of the University of Strathclyde) had its own Medical Faculty from 1800 to 1887, when the parent institution became part of the Glasgow and West of Scotland Technical College. Its most famous alumnus was David Livingstone.

Anderson's College Medical School became independent in 1887. It prepared students for the Triple Qualification diploma (LRCPE, LRCSEd, LRFPSG) which was the Scottish equivalent of the English Conjoint examinations, but not for the University of Glasgow's degrees. This school was attended by large numbers of Americans who were excluded from US East Coast schools by the Jewish quotas applied there before World War II: these included Arthur Sackler, Mortimer Sackler and Raymond Sackler. It was absorbed into the University of Glasgow's Faculty of Medicine in 1947. The building adjacent to the Western Infirmary remained in use for decades.

St Mungo's College Medical School was set up in 1876 by the medical teachers of the Glasgow Royal Infirmary (GRI), after the university had migrated westwards and set up the new Western Infirmary for clinical teaching. At first their students could not take the university examinations. St Mungo's College also had a non-university law school, which prepared accountants and law agents but not advocates. In 1947 it was absorbed into the University of Glasgow's Faculty of Medicine, whose teaching departments remain based within GRI to the present day. The college buildings on the GRI campus remained in use until 1982, when the teaching departments moved into the-then new Queen Elizabeth Building - a multi-storey car park now stands on the site of St. Mungo's College.

== See also ==
- History of public health in the United Kingdom
