= List of schools in Anglesey =

This is a list of schools in the Isle of Anglesey County in Wales.

== Primary schools ==
- Ysgol Beaumaris
- Ysgol Gynradd
- Ysgol Bodffordd
- Ysgol Bogorgan
- Ysgol Bryngwran
- Ysgol Bryngwran
- Ysgol Brynsiencyn
- Ysgol Caergeiliog
- Ysgol Cemaes
- Ysgol Corn Hir
- Ysgol Cybi
- Ysgol Cylch y Garn
- Ysgol Dwyran
- Ysgol Esceifiog
- Ysgol Ffrwd Win
- Ysgol Garreglefn
- Ysgol Goronwy Owen
- Ysgol Gymuned y Fali
- Ysgol Gynradd Amlwch
- Ysgol Kingsland
- Ysgol Llanbedrgoch
- Ysgol Llandegfan
- Ysgol Llanfachraeth
- Ysgol Llanfairpwllgwyngyll
- Ysgol Llanfawr
- Ysgol Llanfechell
- Ysgol Llaingoch - Closed in 2017
- Ysgol Llangaffo
- Ysgol Llangoed
- Ysgol Llannerch-Y-Medd
- Ysgol Henblas
- Ysgol Moelfre
- Ysgol Morswyn
- Ysgol Niwbwrch
- Ysgol Parc Y Bont
- Ysgol Pencarnisiog
- Ysgol Pentraeth
- Ysgol Penysarn
- Ysgol Rhoscolyn
- Ysgol Rhosneigr
- Ysgol Rhosybol
- Ysgol Santes Fair
- Ysgol Talwrn
- Ysgol y Borth
- Ysgol y Ffridd
- Ysgol y Graig
- Ysgol y Tywyn

== Secondary schools ==
- Ysgol David Hughes
- Ysgol Gyfun Llangefni
- Ysgol Syr Thomas Jones
- Ysgol Uwchradd Bodedern
- Ysgol Uwchradd Caergybi

== Special schools ==
- Ysgol y Bont

== Sources ==
- "Primary, secondary and special schools". Isle of Anglesey County Council.
