= Barry Comprehensive School =

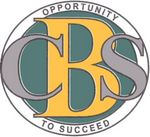
Whitmore High

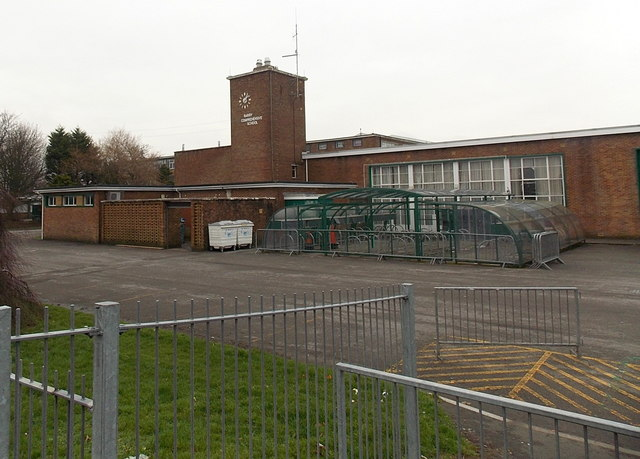

Location
- Port Road West; Barry, Vale of Glamorgan, CF62 8ZJ; Wales; 51°24′55″N 3°17′16″W

Information
- Motto: Opportunity to Succeed
- Established: 1966
- Closed: 2018
- Local authority: The Vale of Glamorgan
- Department for Education URN: 401799 Tables
- Ofsted: Reports
- Headteacher: Thomas Broome
- Gender: Boys; Girls (Sixth Form Only); Joint co-educational 6th form with Bryn Hafren Comprehensive School
- Age: 11 to 19
- Colours: Black and yellow black and yellow
- Website: http://www.whitmorehigh.org/

Barry Comprehensive School (Welsh: Ysgol Gyfun y Barri) was a secondary school for boys aged 11–18, situated opposite Highlight Park in the town of Barry, in Wales. Bryn Hafren Comprehensive School was the partner girls' school that also provides a mixed sixth form for both schools. A new co-educational school reopened on the same site called Whitmore High School.

== History ==
Barry Boys’ Comprehensive School was formed by the merger of Barry Boys' Grammar School and the three Boys' Secondary Modern Schools (Cadoxton, Gladstone and Romilly) in September 1966 with the introduction of comprehensive schools for boys.

In 1993, Barry Sixth Form, a joint sixth form with Bryn Hafren Comprehensive School was created. In 1998, the school dropped the word 'Boys' from its name and thus adopted its current name. Since 2000, the school has been consolidated on one site, following an extensive development and expansion on the original grounds.

Former Headteacher, David Swallow, received an OBE, in June 2003, from the Queen for his work in education.

Barry Comprehensive suffered damage to kitchen and dining areas and some classrooms during a fire caused by an arson attack on 4 August 2006. The attack took place during the school holiday period and the school was able to re-open for pupils at the beginning of the next term. The attack was believed to be caused by students of the school.

On 31 August 2018, Barry Comprehensive School ceased to exist. A new co-educational school called Whitmore High School was formed in its place.

== Academic Standards ==
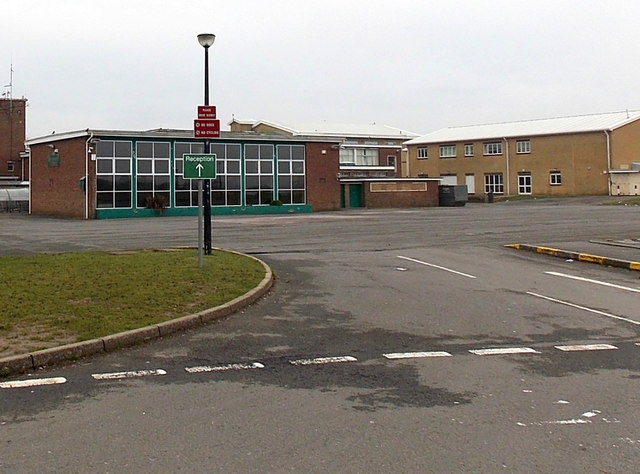
Vehicular entrance to Barry Comprehensive School

Estyn, His Majesty's Inspectorate for Education and Training in Wales, has given this school a Grade 1 overall assessment, the highest available. They described it as "a good school with a significant number of outstanding features that is going from strength to strength under the leadership of its head, David Swallow". Outstanding features of the school include the relationships between teachers and pupils and the quality of care, support and guidance students receive. Children make outstanding progress in their moral and social development in a school that is an orderly and respectful community. Standards of behaviour are very good.

In spring 2006 Barry Comprehensive was named the most improved school in Wales for the third year running.

Barry Comprehensive had the second most improved Key Stage Four results in Wales, 2002 and was also the most improved school in the South Wales region.

The school was one of several chosen to pilot the Welsh Baccalaureate.

The School have introduced an innovative numeracy mentoring scheme with staff from the local chemical plant Dow Corning working with Year 8 boys. Barry Comprehensive has twinned with De Soysa Vidyalaya Moratuwa of Sri Lanka.

In September 2012, Mr. Gerard McNamara took over as head teacher.

== As a filming location ==
The S4C television series Gwaith/Cartref uses Barry Comprehensive regularly as the location for its fictional school, Ysgol Gyfun Gymraeg Bro Taf. The Being Human spin-off series Becoming Human used Barry Comprehensive for various scenes, and most recently, Spanish director Isabel Coixet filmed various scenes on the school grounds for her latest feature that is due to be released in 2013. The film stars Sophie Turner (actress), Gregg Sulkin, Jonathan Rhys Meyers and Ivana Baquero, all of which featuring in scenes filmed in the school. Casualty was also filmed in this school in early 2016

== Sport ==
2004–05 was the inaugural year of a football development partnership between Barry Comprehensive School and Barry Town Football Club.

== Notable former pupils ==
- Derek Brockway – BBC Wales Meteorologist and TV presenter
- Mike Bubbins – comedian and broadcaster
- Gerran Howell – actor
- Kayne McLaggon – Southampton FC Barry Town United F.C. Footballer
- Lee Selby – boxer
- Owen Smith – Labour MP

=== Barry County School for Boys and Barry Grammar School ===
- Ronald Atkins – former Labour MP
- Edwin Brooks – former Labour MP
- Glyn Daniel – archaeologist
- Gwynfor Evans – politician
- Alan Evans (academic) – neuroscientist
- John Habakkuk – economic historian
- Bryan Hopkin – civil servant
- Barnett Janner, Baron Janner – politician
- Gareth Jones – journalist
- J. P. Stern – academic, Germanist
- Robert Tear – operatic tenor Royal Opera House
