= List of schools in Torfaen =

This is a list of schools in Torfaen in Wales.

== Primary schools ==
- Blaenavon Heritage VC Primary School
- Blenheim Road Primary School
- Coed Eva Primary School
- Croesyceiliog Primary School
- Cwmffrwdoer Primary School
- Garnteg Primary School
- George Street Primary School
- Greenmeadow Primary School
- Griffithstown Primary School
- Henllys Church in Wales Primary School
- Llantarnam Community Primary School
- Llanyrafon Primary School
- Maendy Primary School
- Nant Celyn Primary School
- New Inn Primary School
- Our Lady of the Angels RC Primary School
- Padre Pio RC Primary School
- Penygarn Primary School
- Ponthir Church in Wales Primary School
- Pontnewydd Primary School
- St Davids RC Primary School
- Woodlands Primary School
- Ysgol Bryn Onnen
- Ysgol Gymraeg Cwmbran
- Ysgol Gymraeg Gwynllyw
- Ysgol Panteg

== Secondary schools ==
- Abersychan School
- Croesyceiliog School
- Cwmbran High School
- St Alban's RC High School
- West Monmouth School
- Ysgol Gymraeg Gwynllyw, formerly called Ysgol Gyfun Gwynllyw

Llantarnam School was closed in 2015 and amalgamated with Fairwater High on the Fairwater site to form Cwmbran High School.

Trevethin Comprehensive School was closed in 2007.

== Special and alternative provision schools ==
- Abersychan School - special resource base attached
- Crownbridge Special School - age range 2-19 years
- Cwmbran High School - hearing resource base and ASD base attached
- Maendy Primary School - special resource base attached
- Nant Celyn Primary School - ASD base attached and hearing impairment base attached
- Pont Fach Assessment Centre attached to Maendy Primary School
- Pontnewydd Primary School - special resource base attached
- Torfaen Pupil Referral Unit - alternative tuition: Ty Glyn site, Pontypool and New Inn site, Pontypool

== Independent schools ==
- Rougemont School

== Post-16 education and further education ==
- Torfaen Learning Zone, Coleg Gwent - post-16 education and further education
- Ysgol Gymraeg Gwynllyw - 6th form attached (Welsh medium education)

== Adult education centres ==
- Croesyceiliog Community Education Centre, Cwmbran
- The Power Station, Cwmbran
- The Settlement, Pontypool Community Education Centre, Pontypool
