= Ysgol Gymraeg Bro Morgannwg =

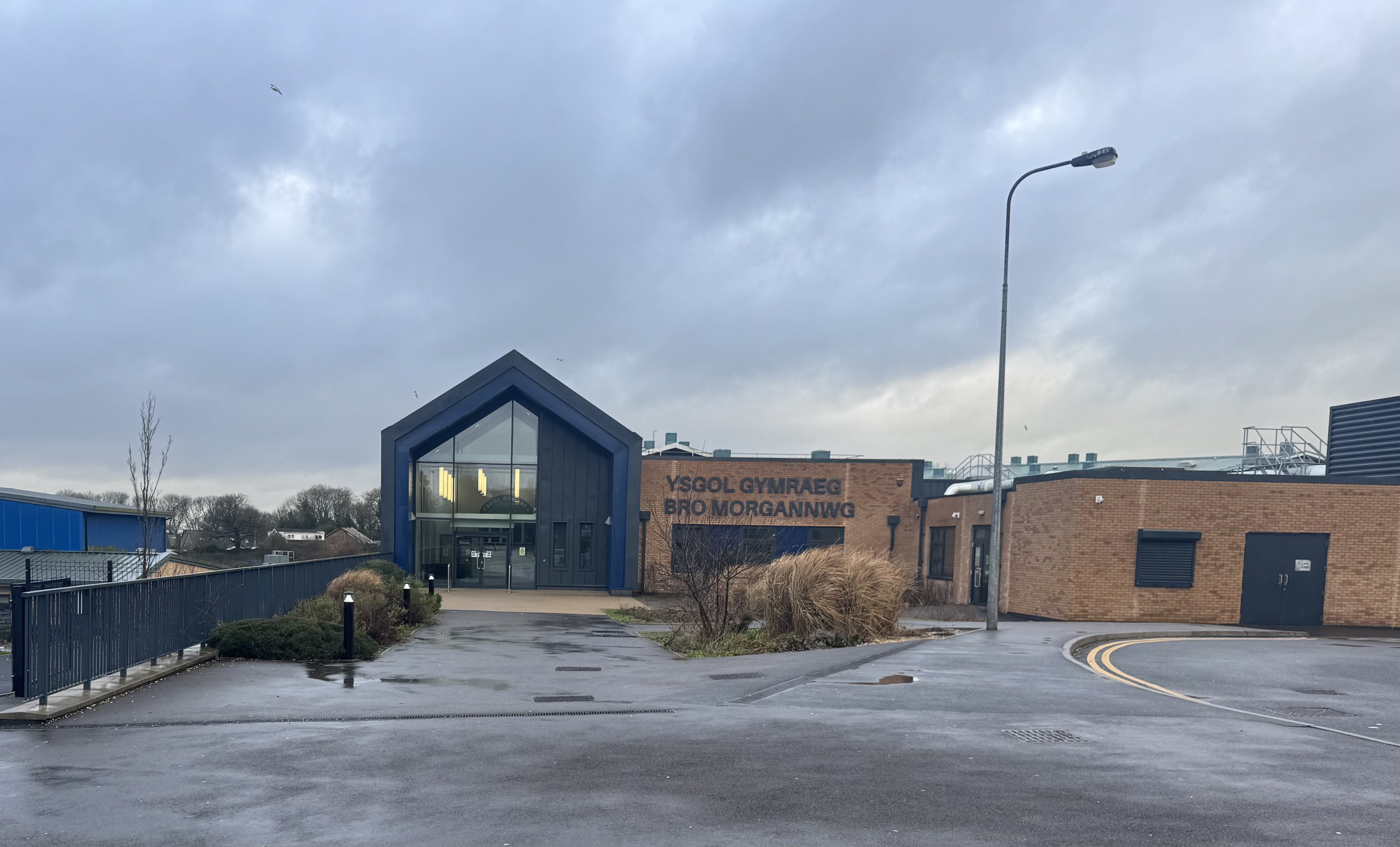

Location
- Colcot Road, Barry; Vale of Glamorgan, CF62 8YU; Wales; 51.4132°N 3.2865°W

Information
- School type: Comprehensive and primary State School
- Motto: Dyro dy law i mi ac fe awn i ben y mynydd (Give me your hand and we'll go to the top of the mountain)
- Religious affiliation: Christian
- Established: 2000
- Local authority: Vale of Glamorgan Council
- Head teacher: Rhys Angell Jones
- Gender: Co-educational
- Age: 3 to 19
- Language: Welsh
- Houses: Cadog, Illtud, Mihangel.
- Colours: Blue and Turquoise
- Website: www.ygbm.cymru

Ysgol Gymraeg Bro Morgannwg (previously Ysgol Gyfun Bro Morgannwg) is a Welsh-medium comprehensive and all-through school in the town of Barry in the Vale of Glamorgan, on the coast of South Wales. It is located adjacent to Barry Hospital and Whitmore High School, Barry. It is currently the only Welsh-medium comprehensive school in the county.

As of April 2026, 37.2% of the school's statutory school age pupils speak Welsh at home and 11.1% are eligible for free school meals over a three-year average. Rhys Angell Jones is the third Headteacher appointed and started the role from 1 January 2021.

Students generally come from the surrounding town of Barry, but are also drawn in from the wider county area, with places such as Wenvoe, Rhoose, Penarth, Sully, Dinas Powys, Cowbridge and Llantwit Major holding a significant proportion of the student body.

== History ==
Ysgol Gyfun Bro Morgannwg was established as a new secondary school in September 2000. The building development programme was planned in phases between 2000 - 2005. In the first instance, the school admitted Year 7 pupils only, with the aim of gradually increasing in number year on year in line with the building schedule.

The first cohort of pupils sat their GCSE/external examinations during 2005. Since September 2006, the school has been fully operational to an upper sixth form level.

On 9 March 2015, the Vale of Glamorgan Council's Cabinet approved the proposal to create a new 1,361 place all through school through the amalgamation of Ysgol Gymraeg Nant Talwg and Ysgol Gyfun Bro Morgannwg. The move would see Ysgol Gymraeg Nant Talwg discontinued and the age range of Ysgol Gyfun Bro Morgannwg extended to provide for children from 3 to 19 from September 2015. Shortly after, the amalgamated school then became Ysgol Gymraeg Bro Morgannwg.

The school won over 7 awards at the Urdd National Eisteddfod in 2017.

Refurbishment and extension of the existing school finished in November 2021. The expansion was required to increase the capacity to 1,660 pupils and is valuated at £21.5m. The existing sports hall and teaching block were demolished which include a new single-storey staff/visitor entrance and administration building, a new sports hall and adjacent three-storey teaching block, an extension to the existing DT department and an extension to the existing dining area to create a new full equipped catering kitchen.

At the 2026 National Eisteddfod the school's choir of 117 members, Côrgannwg, won the "New Choir" competition.

== Alumni ==
- Steffan Jones, rugby player for Wales 7s
- Mason Grady, rugby union player for Cardiff and Wales
- Morfydd Clark, actress
- Annes Elwy, actress
- Hana Lili, singer-songwriter
- Wesley Burns, Wales International Footballer
