= Haverfordwest High VC School =

Coordinates: 51°48′20″N 4°57′44″W

Location
- Haverfordwest High VC School, Scarrowscant Lane; Haverfordwest, SA61 2NX; Wales

Information
- Type: Comprehensive
- Established: 2018
- Headteacher: Jonathan Davies
- Years offered: 7–13
- Gender: Mixed
- Age: 11 to 18
- Enrollment: 1760
- Colours: Black and purple
- Website: Official website

Haverfordwest High VC School is a secondary school in Haverfordwest, Pembrokeshire, Wales, that teaches through the medium of English. It opened in September 2018 after the merger of Tasker Milward Voluntary Controlled School and Sir Thomas Picton School. In 2020 the school was ranked "amber" for performance in the Welsh Government's colour-coded performance scheme, meaning that the school is in need of improvement via external support.

== Controversy ==
=== Sexual messages sent by a trainee ===
On 4 October 2022, a "man undertaking training" at the school was accused of having conversations with pupils of the school on social media. The purported conversations are said to be 'highly sexual'. The local authority, Pembrokeshire County Council, later confirmed that the man had been removed from the school premises and that a "multi-agency referral" had been set up due to the allegations made.
