= Ysgol Dinas Brân =

Location
- Dinbren Road; Llangollen, Denbighshire, LL20 8TG; Wales; 52°58′22″N 3°10′13″W

Information
- Type: Secondary school
- Motto: Success through Effort
- Local authority: Denbighshire County Council
- Department for Education URN: 401695 Tables
- Headteacher: Mark Hatch
- Gender: Coeducational
- Age: 11 to 18
- Enrolment: 1072 (2023)
- Colours: Teal, gray, white and black
- Website: dinasbran.co.uk

Ysgol Dinas Brân is an 11-18 bilingual co-educational secondary school in Llangollen, Denbighshire, Wales. It serves the town of Llangollen and the surrounding areas includinrg Corwen, Wrexham, Johnstown, Ruabon, Cefn Mawr, and Trevor. The school was previously called Llangollen Grammar School. The school had 1072 pupils on roll in 2023.

In the January 2012 National ranking of all secondary schools in Wales, the school was listed 7th (out of 230 school) - making Ysgol Dinas Brân the 3rd best school in North Wales.

In 2018, 11% of students spoke Welsh as a first language or to an equivalent standard, with approximately a tenth of pupils being educated in the Welsh-medium stream of the school.

In 2008, the school opened a sixth form and learning centre on the campus. The sports hall was opened in 2000.

A level results in 2008 showed a 100% pass rate, giving the school the top position in Wales for A-level results.

Dinas Brân launched the World Youth Skills Challenge in June 2009, with nearly 250 or more competitors.

Each year, the International Musical Eisteddfod starts every first week of July, and Ysgol Dinas Brân holds a transition week, where all of the Year 6 students are introduced to their soon-to-be Secondary School. Ysgol Dinas Brân holds a session for the Year 6 students and the pupils of Ysgol Dinas Brân, where they go to the International Eisteddfod and visit the stalls and the Llangollen Pavilion for an hour at the school.

== Infrastructure ==
The school buildings were constructed in the 1930s and added to on an ad-hoc basis.
