= Tasker Milward Voluntary Controlled School =

Coordinates: 51.7968°N 4.9816°W

Tasker Milward VC School
- Portfield Avenue, Haverfordwest, Pembrokeshire, SA61 1EQ; Wales

Information
- Type: Comprehensive
- Established: 1978
- Closed: 2018
- Acting Headteacher: Helen Lewis
- Staff: 45
- Years offered: 7–13
- Gender: Mixed
- Age: 11 to 18
- Enrollment: 750
- Colours: Red and green
- Website: Official website

Tasker Milward Voluntary Controlled School was a secondary school in Haverfordwest, Pembrokeshire, South West Wales, that taught through the medium of English. It had 750 students in 2016, significantly fewer than in 2009, when there were 1,100. It was ranked red by the Welsh government categorisation scheme in 2015, but made considerable improvements in 2016. The Sixth Form was a member of the "Haverfordwest federation", which linked it with Sir Thomas Picton School and Pembrokeshire College. The school closed in 2018 when it merged with Sir Thomas Picton School to form Haverfordwest High VC School.

== History ==
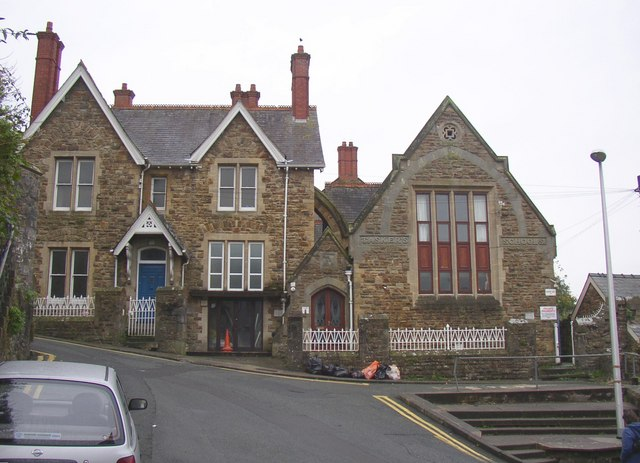
The old building of Tasker's School for Girls, Tower Hill, Haverfordwest.

Tasker-Milward School was created in 1978 after the closure of two separate schools, the Haverfordwest Grammar School and Tasker's School for Girls.

Haverfordwest Grammar School was founded by no later than 1488. Thomas Lloyd, of Cilciffeth near Llanychaer, endowed the school with property in his will dated 22 November 1612. This included farms, which earned a rental income, enabling the school to be free. The school also benefited from the will of John Milward in 1654, who also bequeathed to King's Grammar School, Birmingham. The grammar school was a boarding school until it moved to new premises in 1965. It was located where the town's library stands today. It was also, between 1938 and 1958, a Public School, its headmaster RS Lang being a member of the Headmasters' Conference

Tasker's Charity School was established by the Tasker Charity, which was set up by Mary Tasker (previously Miss Howard/Hayward, of 1 Flether Hill, Rudbaxton) in her will dated 1684, to educate poor children of both sexes, although it later became a school for girls. The old school buildings have since been turned into flats.

Tasker's School for Girls and Haverfordwest Grammar School ceased to exist in 1978, and pupils transferred to the new Tasker-Milward school.

M Haynes became headteacher in September 2007. Following her departure, H Lewis became acting headteacher with effect from June 2014.

Due to budget concerns from Pembrokeshire County Council in addition to the underperforming GCSE and A Level results from both schools over a period of a few years, the decision was made to merge Tasker Milward V.C. School and Sir Thomas Picton School into a new School, Haverfordwest High VC School, using the Tasker site (now known as the Portfield Campus) for lower School and the Sir Thomas Picton site (now known as the Prendergast campus) for upper school and Sixth form use, in addition with a completely new uniform consisting of ties and blazers, a contrast from what both schools uniforms were, which were polo tops and jumpers. Both Tasker Milward V.C. School and Sir Thomas Picton School ceased to exist in August 2018 and the new combined school opened in September 2018.

== Amenities ==
The school had three buildings located on site:

The Milward Building (Bottom School), housed the English, Maths, Chemistry, Physics, Physical Education departments and the library; the Humanities Block (H Block), where the Geography, Geology, History and RE departments were based ("H Block" was built in 2001); and the Tasker Building (Top School), where the Welsh, MFL, Biology, ICT, Drama, Media Studies, Music, Technology and Art departments were based. This Tasker Building also catered for the Sixth Form, providing a computer/work area and a common room.

=== Sporting ===
There is an inflatable sports dome on the grounds, referred to as The Dome, which contains two tennis courts and a basketball/netball court. The Dome is open to the public after school hours (from 4pm), on weekends and school holidays. Other sporting facilities include four outside tennis courts, an all-terrain pitch (ATP) and rugby pitch.

=== Special needs facilities ===
The school has had ramps and stair lifts installed in bottom school. Top school is less well equipped and has no disabled access for most classrooms. There is one stair lift for disabled access to the Music, Drama and English Rooms.

In summer 2008 some of the playing field was lost to the building of the new Portfield special-needs school. As part of the arrangements, the all-weather pitch was refurbished and is now a multi-purpose ATP.

Throughout summer 2014, the Tasker Milward Welsh Department moved upstairs to form the language department, in which languages are taught. The old Welsh department is now owned by Portfield special-needs school, and has been developed into two new classrooms for that school.

== Controversy ==
=== Sexual education policy ===
On 20 August 2013 the school was accused of having a sex education policy that referenced Section 28 (a now repealed act).

The policy stated "Section 28 of the Local Government Act does not prevent teachers from addressing issues of homosexuality in the classroom in a neutral and unbiased manner, however, the local authority shall not intentionally promote homosexuality or publish material which actively promotes homosexuality."

The school was immediately put under the investigation of the Welsh Government, who described the policy as 'simply unacceptable'.

The school initially refused to comment. However, Pembrokeshire County Council released a statement stating "The Sex Education policy on the Tasker-Milward school website was an old policy not in operation and which had not been deleted. The school does have a current Strategic Equality Plan, further details of which can be obtained directly from the school. The then headteacher, Maggie Haynes, apologised for any distress that the failure to remove the old policy from the website may have caused.

== Currently ==
The Tasker Milward site at the old Portfield campus has been sitting mostly unused since Haverfordwest High VC School moved out in 2022, and the buildings have been steadily falling apart ever since. With no classes or staff on the grounds, basic upkeep stopped, and the place has suffered from leaks, damaged ceilings, and general wear that’s built up over the last few years. The empty campus has also ended up attracting various forms of antisocial behaviour over the past few years. People have been getting inside the buildings, damaging rooms, and taking out bits of wiring and other fittings that were left behind. The current building has no future plans but has been bought by a unknown buyer.

== Notable former pupils ==
- Stephen Crabb – Member of Parliament for Preseli Pembrokeshire and former Secretary of State for Wales
- Ian Gale – RAF officer
- Jonathan Goodwin – Magician and escapologist
- Barry John – Soldier and artist
- Chelsea Manning – U.S. Army soldier convicted of leaking classified information via WikiLeaks
- Matthew Nicklin – High Court judge
