= Denbighshire =

County in Wales

Denbighshire Sir Ddinbych (Welsh)
- County
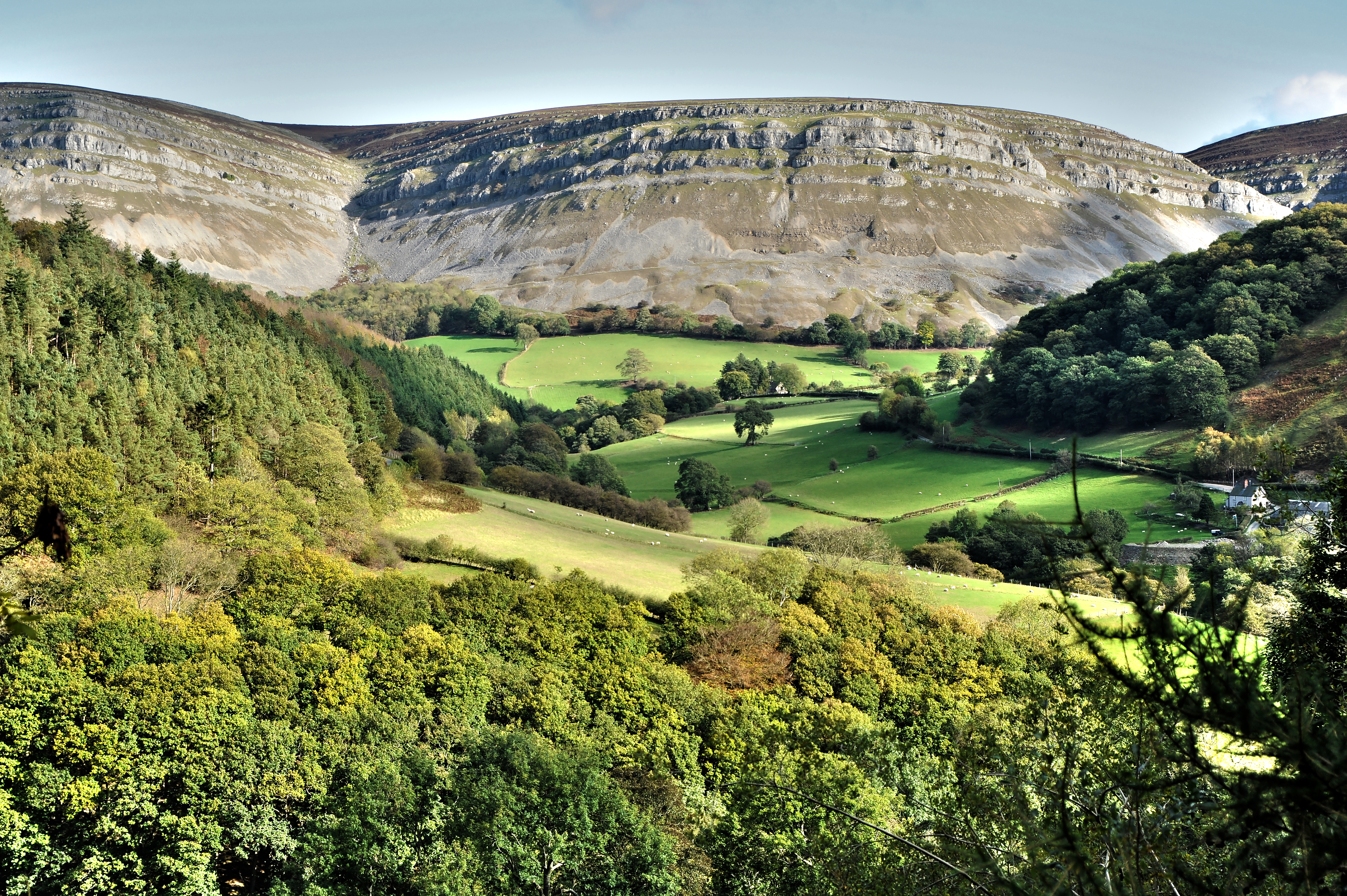
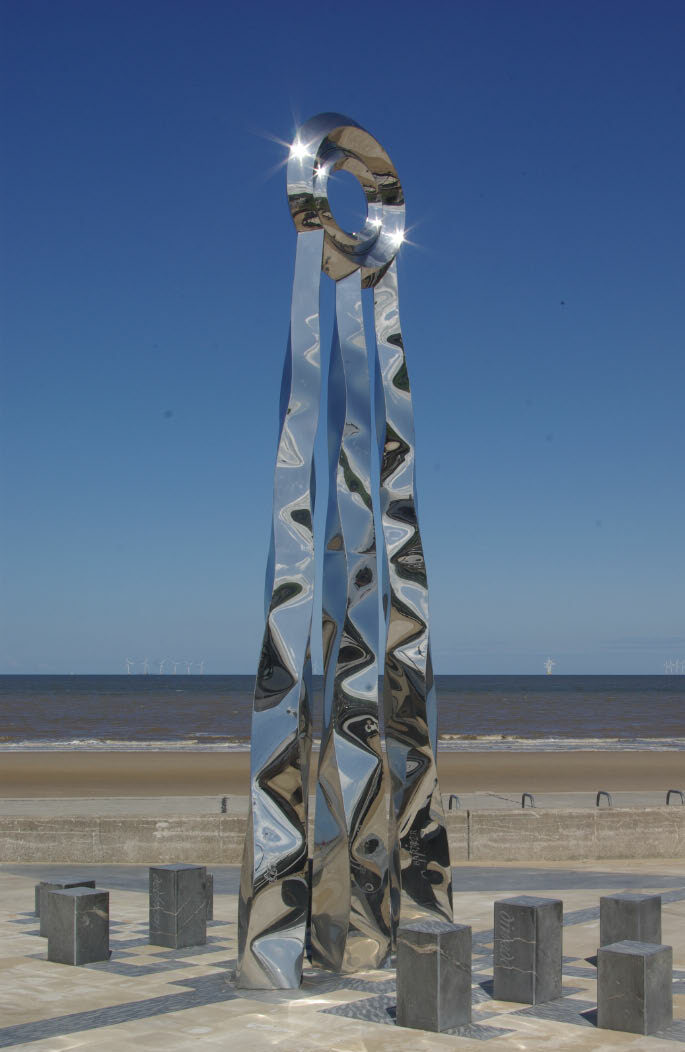
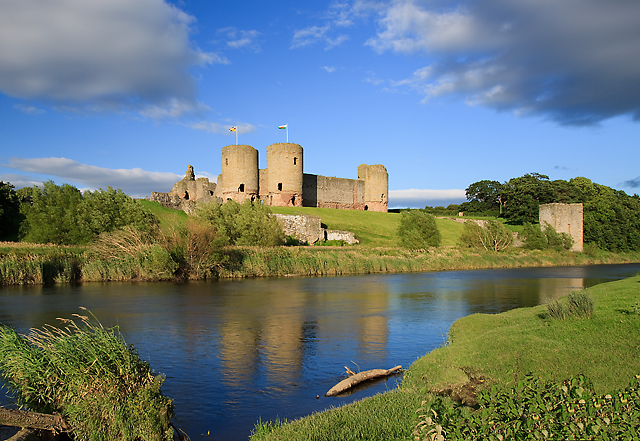
- Left to Right: The Eglwyseg valley, northeast of Llangollen; Dechrau a diwedd, Prestatyn, marking Offa's Dyke Path's end; Rhuddlan Castle along the River Clwyd

- Coat of arms
- Motto: Welsh: Unwn i Wneud Da, lit. 'we unite to do good'
- Denbighshire shown within Wales
- Coordinates: 53°05′12″N 3°21′16″W
- Sovereign state: United Kingdom
- Country: Wales
- Preserved county: Clwyd
- Incorporated: 1 April 1996
- Administrative HQ: Ruthin

Government
  - Type: Principal council
  - Body: Denbighshire County Council
  - Control: No overall control
  - MPs: 4 MPs: Gill German (L); Becky Gittins (L); Claire Hughes (L); Liz Saville Roberts (PC)
  - MSs: 18 MSs: 6 in Bangor Conwy Môn; 6 in Clwyd; 6 in Gwynedd Maldwyn

Area
  - Total: 323 sq mi (837 km^{2})
  - Rank: 8th

Population (2025)
  - Total: 98,247
  - Rank: 16th
  - Density: 300/sq mi (117/km^{2})
- Time zone: UTC+0 (GMT)
  - Summer (DST): UTC+1 (BST)
- ISO 3166 code: GB-DEN
- GSS code: W06000004
- Website: denbighshire.gov.uk

Berwyn Viaducts, Denbighshire

Denbighshire (/ˈdɛnbiʃər, -ʃɪər/ DEN-bee-shər, -sheer; Welsh: Sir Ddinbych [ˌsiːr ˈðɪnbɨχ]) is a county in the north-east of Wales. It borders the Irish Sea to the north, Flintshire to the east, Wrexham to the southeast, Powys to the south, and Gwynedd and Conwy to the west. Rhyl is the largest town, and Ruthin is the administrative centre. Its borders differ from the historic county of the same name.

Denbighshire has an area of 326 square miles (840 km^{2}) and a population of 95,800, making it sparsely populated. The most populous area is the coast, where Rhyl and Prestatyn form a single built-up area with a population of 46,267. The next-largest towns are Denbigh, Ruthin, and Rhuddlan, while St Asaph is its only city. All of these settlements are in the northern half of the county; the south is even less densely populated, and the only towns are Corwen and Llangollen.

The geography of Denbighshire is defined by the broad valley of the River Clwyd, which is surrounded by rolling hills on all sides except the north, where it reaches the coast. The Vale of Clwyd, the lower valley, is given over to crops, while cattle and sheep graze the uplands. The Clwydian Range in the east is part of the Clwydian Range and Dee Valley Area of Outstanding Natural Beauty.

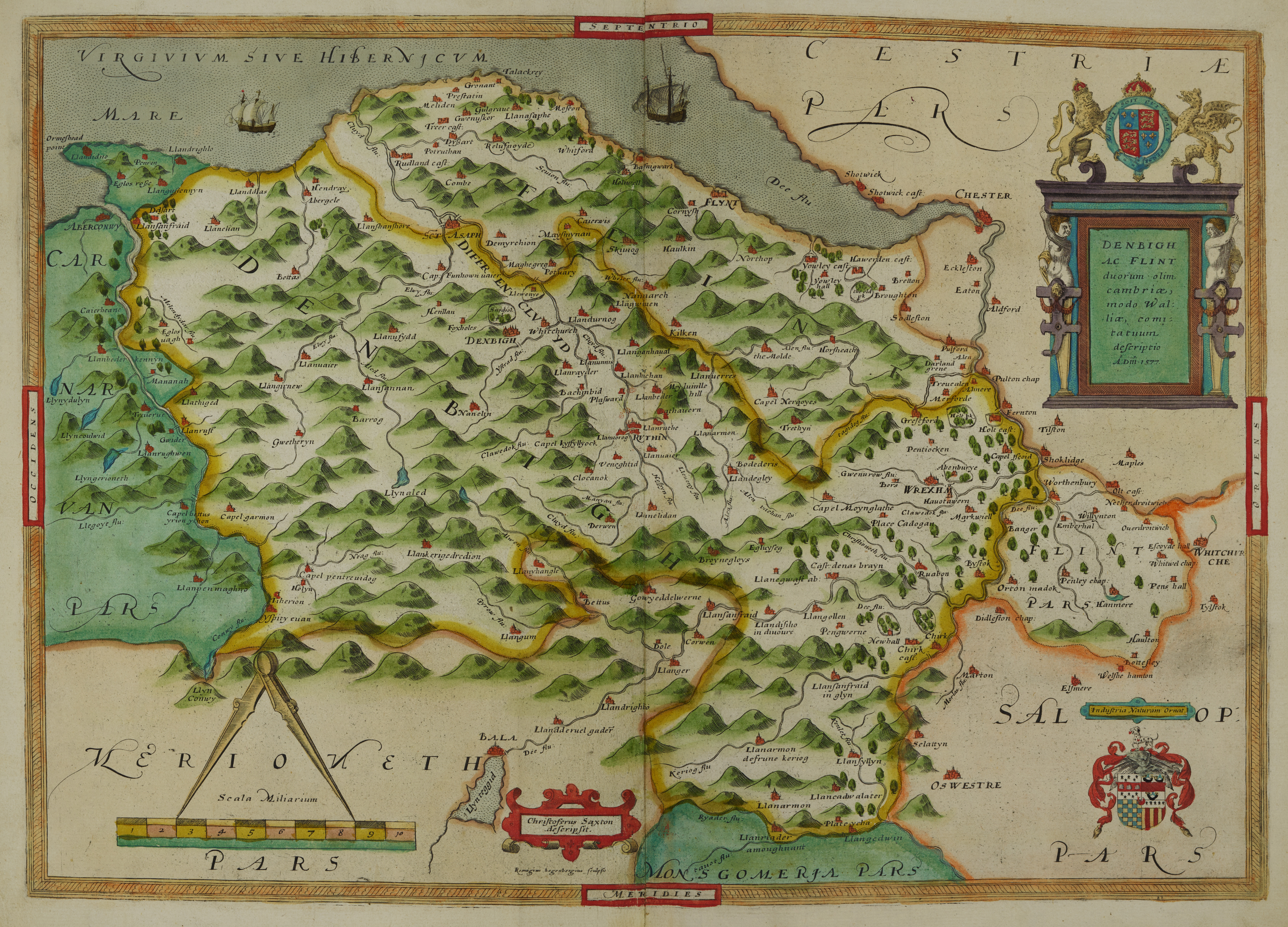
Hand-drawn map of Denbigh and Flint by Christopher Saxton from 1576

This part of Wales contains the country's oldest known evidence of habitation – Pontnewydd (Bontnewydd-Llanelwy) Palaeolithic site has Neanderthal remains of some 225,000 years ago. The county is also home to several medieval castles, including Castell Dinas Brân, Denbigh, and Rhuddlan, as well as St Asaph Cathedral. Llangollen International Musical Eisteddfod takes place in the town each July.

== Formation ==
The main area was formed on 1 April 1996 under the Local Government (Wales) Act 1994, from various parts of the county of Clwyd. It includes the district of Rhuddlan (formed in 1974 entirely from Flintshire), the communities of Trefnant and Cefn Meiriadog from the district of Colwyn (entirely Denbighshire) and most of the Glyndŵr district. The last includes the former Edeyrnion Rural District, part of the administrative county of Merionethshire before 1974, covering the parishes of Betws Gwerfil Goch, Corwen, Gwyddelwern, Llangar, Llandrillo yn Edeirnion and Llansanffraid.

Other principal areas including part of historical Denbighshire are Conwy, which picked up the remainder of 1974–1996 Colwyn, the Denbighshire parts of 1974–1996 Aberconwy, and Wrexham, which corresponds to the pre-1974 borough of Wrexham along with most of Wrexham Rural District and several parishes of Glyndŵr. Post-1996 Powys includes the historically Denbighshire parishes of Llanrhaeadr-ym-Mochnant, Llansilin and Llangedwyn, which formed part of Glyndŵr district.

== Early history ==
Researchers have found signs that Denbighshire was inhabited at least 225,000 years ago. Bontnewydd Palaeolithic site is one of the most significant in Britain. Hominid remains of probable Neanderthals have been found, along with stone tools from the later Middle Pleistocene.

=== Archaeology ===
In 2021 February, archaeologists from Aeon Archaeology announced a discovery of over 300 Stone Age tools and artifacts in Rhuddlan. They revealed scrapers, microliths, flakes of chert (a hard, fine-grained, sedimentary rock composed of microcrystalline or cryptocrystalline quartz), flints and other rudimentary tools. An expert, Richard Cooke, believes the lithic remains belonged to ancient peoples, who while passing through the area, made camp by the river more than 9,000 years ago.

== Geography ==
See also List of places in Denbighshire.

The eastern edge of Denbighshire follows the ridge of the Clwydian Range, with a steep escarpment to the west and a high point at Moel Famau (1,820 ft (555 m)), which with the upper Dee Valley forms an Area of Outstanding Natural Beauty, the Clwydian Range and Dee Valley – one of just five in the Wales. The Denbigh Moors (Mynydd Hiraethog) are in the west of the county and the Berwyn Range adjacent to the southern edge. The River Clwyd has a broad fertile Vale running from south–north in the centre of the county. There is a narrow coastal plain in the north which much residential and holiday-trade development. The highest point in the historic county was Cadair Berwyn at 832 m or 2,730 ft), but the boundary changes since 1974 make Cadair Berwyn North Top the highest point. Denbighshire borders the present-day principal areas of Gwynedd, Conwy County Borough, Flintshire, Wrexham County Borough, and Powys.

Rhyl and Prestatyn form a single built-up area in the north of the county, with a population of 46,267. They are immediately adjacent to the Kinmel Bay and Abergele built-up area in neighbouring Conwy, and at the eastern end of series of coastal resorts which that also includes Colwyn Bay and Llandudno further west.

== Population ==
According to the 2021 United Kingdom census, Denbighshire's population was approximately 95,800. According to previous censuses, the population of Denbighshire was 93,734 in 2011 and 93,065 in 2001. The largest towns on the coast are Rhyl (2001 population c. 25,000) and Prestatyn (2001 population c. 18,000). According to the 2011 Census returns, 24.6 per cent stated they could speak Welsh.

== Economy ==
Since the 20th-century demise of the coal and steel industries in the Wrexham area, there is no heavy industry in the county. Although most towns have small industrial parks or estates for light industry, the economy is based on agriculture and tourism. Much of the working population is employed in the service sector. The uplands support sheep and beef cattle rearing, while in the Vale of Clwyd dairy farming and wheat and barley crops predominate. Many towns have livestock markets and farming supports farm machinery merchants, vets, feed merchants, contractors and other ancillaries. With their incomes on the decline, farmers have found opportunities in tourism, rural crafts, specialist food shops, farmers' markets and value-added food products.

The upland areas with their sheep farms and small, stone-walled fields are attractive to visitors. Redundant farm buildings are often converted into self-catering accommodation, while many farmhouses supply bed and breakfast. The travel trade began with the arrival of the coast railway in the mid-19th century, opening up the area to Merseyside. This led to a boom in seaside guest houses. More recently, caravan sites and holiday villages have thrived and ownership of holiday homes increased. Initiatives to boost the economy of North Wales continue, including redevelopment of the Rhyl seafront and funfair.

== Transport ==
Apart from the Llangollen Railway, the only stations are Prestatyn and Rhyl on the North Wales Coast Line with direct services to Manchester, London and Cardiff, all via Chester. Services are provided by Transport for Wales and Avanti West Coast.

There are no motorways in Denbighshire. The A55 dual carriageway links to the motorway network via Chester, and Holyhead along the North Wales coast. The A548 runs from Chester to Abergele through Deeside and along the coast, before leaving the coast and terminating at Llanrwst. The original main road from London, the A5, passes west through Llangollen, and Corwen, then heads towards Bangor. The A494 links Mold with Corwen via Ruthin, and the A525 links Rhyl with Wrexham via St Asaph, Denbigh and Ruthin.

There are local bus services running from Prestatyn. With no rail connection, Llangollen has a regular bus service from Wrexham. Corwen Bus Station links to Barmouth, Bangor, Denbigh and Wrexham.

== Politics ==
The four UK parliament constituencies covering Denbighshire since 2024. 1 = Clwyd North, 2 = Bangor Aberconwy, 3 = Dwyfor Meirionnydd and 4 = Clwyd East.

Denbighshire was last represented in the House of Commons by three MPs. The Welsh Labour Party lost to the Welsh Conservatives in the 2019 general election for the first time.

The following MPs were elected from Denbighshire in 2019:

- Simon Baynes (Welsh Conservatives) in Clwyd South, first elected in 2019.
- David Jones (Welsh Conservatives) in Clwyd West, first elected in 2005.
- James Davies (Welsh Conservatives) in Vale of Clwyd, first elected in 2019.

From 2024, Denbighshire is covered by four constituencies. These are Bangor Aberconwy, Clwyd North, Clwyd East and Dwyfor Meirionnydd.

Denbighshire is also represented in the Senedd by three Senedd constituencies since 2026 Senedd election; Bangor Conwy Môn, Clwyd and Gwynedd Maldwyn.

In 2019, research by UnHerd in association with the pollster FocalData showed that most people across the county support the British monarchy.

== See also ==
- Denbighshire (historic)
- List of Lord Lieutenants of Denbighshire
- List of Custodes Rotulorum of Denbighshire
- List of High Sheriffs of Denbighshire
- Denbighshire (UK Parliament constituency)
- List of places in Denbighshire
- List of schools in Denbighshire
