= List of schools in Monmouthshire =

This is a list of schools in Monmouthshire in Wales.

== English medium primary schools ==
- Archbishop Rowan Williams CW Primary School
- Cantref Primary School
- Castle Park Primary School
- Cross Ash Primary School
- The Dell Primary School
- Dewstow Primary School
- Durand Primary School
- Gilwern Primary School
- Goytre Fawr Primary School
- Kymin View Primary School
- Llandogo Primary School
- Llanfoist Primary School
- Llantillio Pertholey CW Primary School
- Llanvihangel Crucorney Primary School
- Magor CW Primary School
- Osbaston CW Primary School
- Our Lady and St Michael's RC Primary School
- Overmonnow Primary School
- Pembroke Primary School
- Raglan Primary School
- Rogiet Primary School
- Shirenewton Primary School
- St Marys RC Primary School
- Thornwell Primary School
- Trellech Primary School
- Undy Primary School
- Usk CW Primary School

== Welsh medium primary schools ==
- Ysgol Gymraeg Trefynwy
- Ysgol Gymraeg Y Fenni
- Ysgol Gymraeg Y Ffin

== Secondary schools ==
- Caldicot School
- Chepstow School
- King Henry VIII School Abergavenny
- Monmouth Comprehensive School

== Independent schools ==
- Llangattock School Monmouth
- Haberdashers' Monmouth School for Girls
- Monmouth School For Boys
