= Sodston Manor =

Coordinates: 51.8153°N 4.7549°W

Sodston Manor is a heritage listed Victorian manor house located near Narberth, Pembrokeshire, Wales. It is currently a private home.

== History ==
The house was built circa 1860 for Sir Alfred Ernle Montacute-Chatfield. It was designed in a plain Italianate style, on a square plan, with two above-ground storeys and a basement.

The interior had an entrance hall with a staircase including barley twist balusters. A servants hall was connected to a basement kitchen via a separate staircase.

The house became Grade II listed in 1988.

In September 2015 a private secondary school of 97 pupils and 23 staff relocated to Sodston Manor. Sodston Manor was bought for £270,000 and Harrison spent a further £230,000 on repairs and refurbishment. The School relocated to Glenover House in Haverfordwest in 2020.
