= The Maelor School =

Coordinates: 52.9527°N 2.86881°W

The Maelor School, Penley
- Penley, Wrexham County Borough; Wales

Information
- Type: Mixed comprehensive
- Established: 1957
- Head teacher: Leanne Eyre
- Gender: Co-educational
- Age: 11 to 18
- Houses: 5: Clwyd, Dyfed, Gwent, Gwynedd, Powys
- Slogan: "Adnabod eich Potensial" - Realise your Potential
- Website: http://www.maelorschool.org.uk/

The Maelor School, Penley (Welsh: Ysgol Maelor) is a mixed comprehensive school situated in the village of Penley, Wrexham County Borough, in north-east Wales. In 2025, the school had 787 pupils aged 11–18.

== History ==
The Maelor school was established in 1957 within the English Maelor area, then within the county of Flintshire, in the village of Penley (Welsh: Llanerch Banna) to serve the needs of the rural communities surrounding it.

Prior to the school being built, there were originally proposals to build an open prison on the land. However, this was met by opposition from the surrounding communities and eventually the proposals were over-ruled and the decision was made to build a school instead. The school cost £93,000 to build and originally accommodated 240 pupils. The school consisted of six classrooms, stores, a handicraft room, a science laboratory, a kitchen, a general practical room, a library, a gymnasium, changing rooms, cloakrooms, offices, staff rooms, and an assembly hall complete with a stage. The school sat in nine acres of grounds, complete with three tennis courts, a large concrete drill area, and provision for two soccer pitches, two hockey pitches and two cricket pitches. The school was officially opened on 6 November 1957 by Dowager Lady Kenyon.

== The Badge ==
The school's badge was designed by two of the school's original staff. The bird, a chough from the Flintshire coat of arms, symbolises the school's historical link with the county, going back to the thirteenth century. The sheaf of wheat from the Cheshire flag symbolises the region's agricultural background and also references its link with that county of which it was once a part in antiquity. The two blue lions, those of Hanmer, represent the Maelor's historic families as well as Sir Edward Hanmer's interest in the school. The red chevron represents the Maelor's separation from the rest of the county and the black crosses symbolise the Maelor's contributory parishes and townships.

== Academia ==
The school provides a curriculum for pupils in Years 7–13, including a broad lower school curriculum, GCSE courses in Years 10 and 11, and A-Level courses in the sixth form.

During 2014 The Daily Post ranked The Maelor School as the 6th best school in North Wales out of 3,079.

In January 2015 The Maelor School was confirmed as achieving the highest grades in Wales for pupils who receive free school meals.

== Facilities and development ==
The school campus includes a range of teaching, library and sports facilities, including an on-site swimming pool and sports hall. In 2021, a new classroom block for the humanities department was opened. And came with a state of the art toilet

== Notable alumni ==
- Tim Vincent Media (Most known for Blue Peter)

== External Sources ==
- The Maelor School
