= List of schools in Newport, Wales =

This is a list of schools in the city of Newport, South Wales.

== Primary schools ==
- Alway Primary School
- Brynglas Primary School
- Charles Williams Church in Wales Primary School, Caerleon
- Lodge Hill Primary School, Caerleon
- Clytha Primary School
- Crindau Primary School
- Tredegar Park Primary School
- Eveswell Primary School
- Gaer Primary School
- Glan Usk Primary School
- Glasllwch Primary School
- High Cross Primary School
- Langstone Primary School
- Llanmartin Primary School
- Lliswerry Primary School
- Maesglas Primary School
- Maindee Primary School
- Malpas Church Primary School
- Malpas Court Primary School
- Malpas Park Primary School
- Marshfield Primary School
- Millbrook Primary School
- Milton Primary School
- Monnow Primary School
- Mount Pleasant Primary School
- Pentrepoeth Primary School
- Pillgwenlly Primary School
- Ringland Primary School
- Rogerstone Primary School
- Somerton Primary School
- St Andrew's Primary School
- St David's Primary School
- St Gabriel's RC Primary School
- St Joseph's RC Primary School
- St Julian's Primary School
- St Mary's RC Primary School
- St Michael's RC Primary School
- St Patrick's RC Primary School
- St Woolos Primary School
- Ysgol Gymraeg Bro Teyrnon ð
- Ysgol Gymraeg Casnewydd ð
- Ysgol Gymraeg Ifor Hael ð
- Ysgol Gymraeg Nant Gwenlli ð

ð symbol indicates schools delivering Welsh-medium education

== State secondary schools ==
- Bassaleg School
- Caerleon Comprehensive School
- John Frost School
- Llanwern High School
- Lliswerry High School
- Newport High School
- St Joseph's RC High School
- St Julian's School
- Ysgol Gyfun Gwent Is Coed, delivering a Welsh-medium education

== Special schools ==
- Maes Ebbw School
- Ysgol Bryn Derw

== Independent schools ==
- Rougemont School
