= Pencoedtre High School =

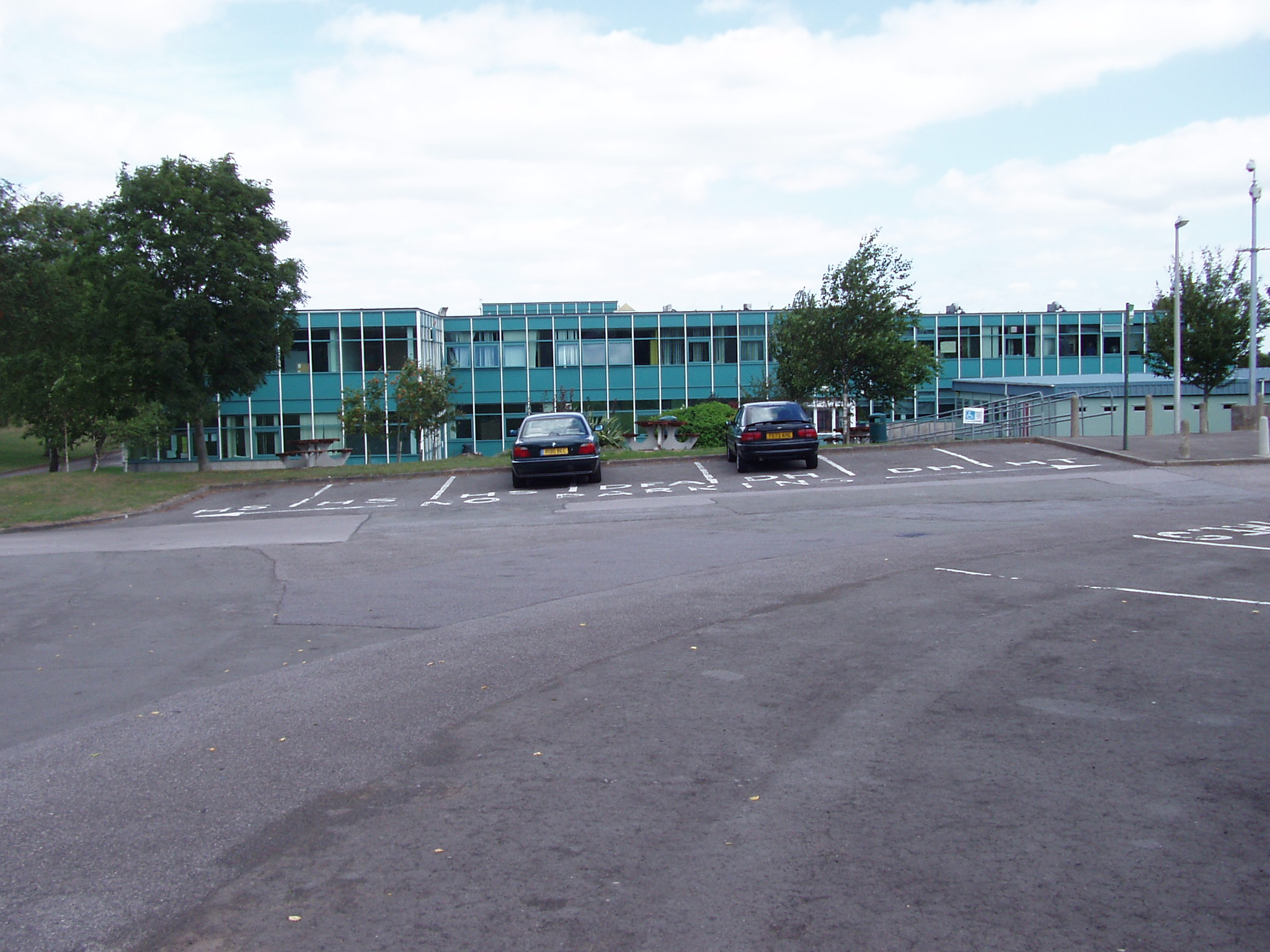

Location
- Merthyr Dyfan Road; Barry, South Glamorgan (ceremonial county), CF62 9YQ; Wales; 51°25′29″N 3°16′03″W

Information
- Type: Comprehensive school
- Motto: Learning for Life
- Religious affiliation: Multi
- Established: 1973
- Local authority: The Vale of Glamorgan
- Executive headteacher: Vince Brown
- Headteacher: Lee Humphreys
- Gender: Co-educational since 2018; Joint co-educational 6th form with Barry Comprehensive School
- Age: 11 to 19
- Enrolment: c. 1300
- Colours: Black and gold
- Website: https://www.pencoedtrehigh.org.uk/

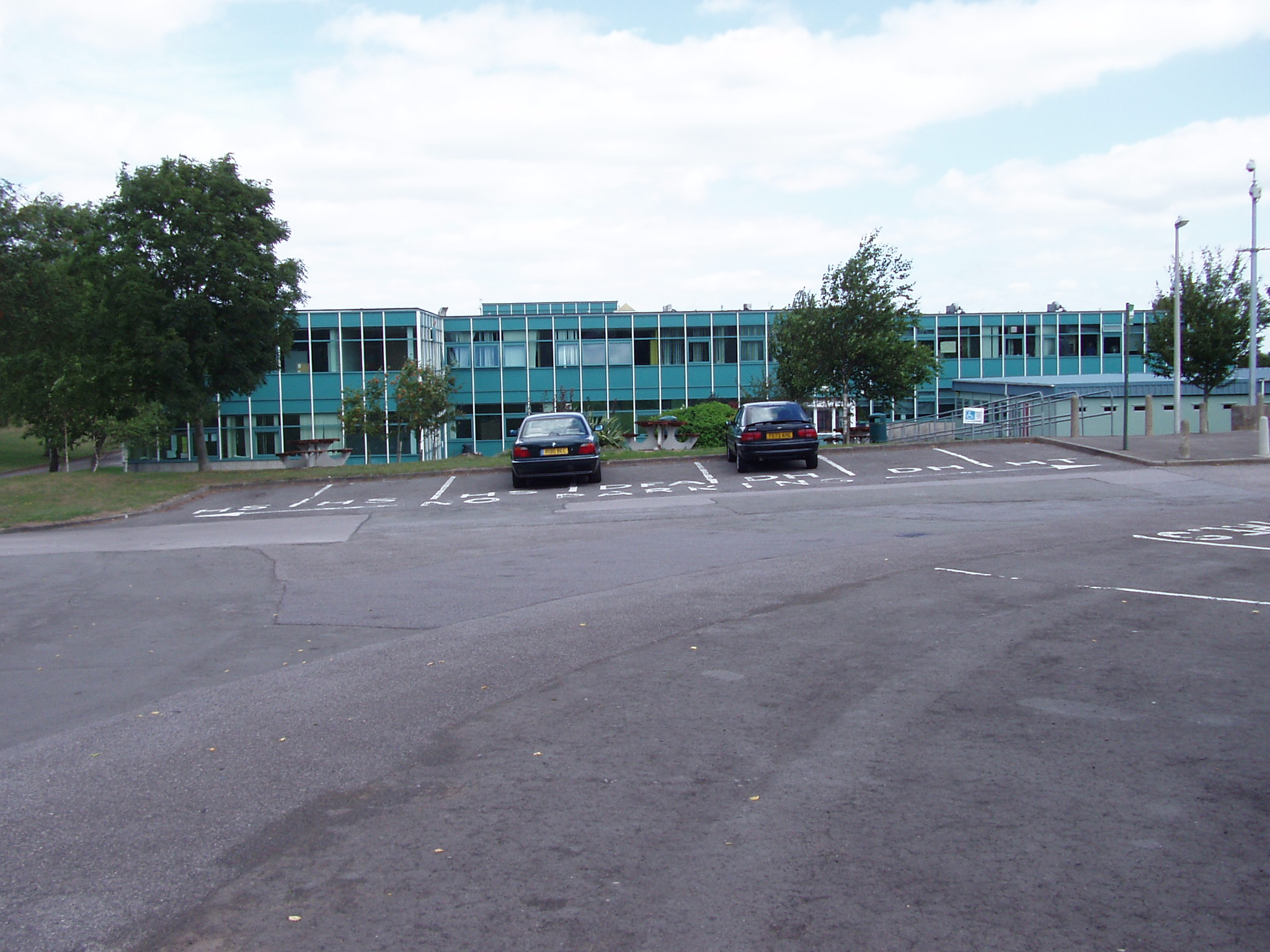
Bryn Hafren

Pencoedtre High School, formerly called Bryn Hafren Comprehensive School, is in Merthyr Dyfan on the outskirts of the town of Barry near Cardiff in Wales. It was opened as Bryn Hafren Comprehensive School in 1971, an 11-19 girls' comprehensive school for approximately 1,300 pupils. In 2018 the school became mixed-sex and was renamed Pencoedtre High School. It shares a mixed-sex joint 6th form with Barry Comprehensive School, formerly a boys' school, since 2018 co-educational under the name 'Whitmore High School'.

The school's catchment area is the Vale of Glamorgan, stretching from Rhoose in the west to Wenvoe in the north, and to Ely in west Cardiff, with the town of Barry in the centre.

== History ==
When comprehensive schools were introduced to Barry in September 1966, this was delayed for girls because of the lack of buildings. Bryn Hafren Comprehensive School opened as the comprehensive school for girls in 1973.

In 1993, Barry Sixth Form, a joint sixth form with Barry Boys' Comprehensive School was created.

In 2018, the school became Pencoedtre High School and became a mixed-gender school.

== Facilities ==
The school ground covers 36 acres (150,000 m^{2}), with sports fields, tennis courts, a gymnasium, a swimming pool and a recently developed fitness gym and two beauty salons.

The school also houses a dedicated 6th form block and over 14 networked computer rooms.
