= Ysgol Gyfun Rhydywaun =

Ysgol Gyfun Gymraeg Rhydywaun

Location
- Laurence Avenue; Penywaun, Rhondda Cynon Taf, CF44 9ES; Wales; 51.7346°N 3.4932°W

Information
- Type: Secondary comprehensive
- Motto: Gwir. Gweithgar. Gwych.
- Established: 1995
- Local authority: Rhondda Cynon Taf
- Department for Education URN: 401822 Tables
- Head teacher: Lisa Williams
- Staff: 80+
- Teaching staff: 60+
- Gender: Mixed
- Age: 11 to 19
- Enrolment: 1030
- Language: Welsh
- Houses: Cynon, Dar, Taf
- Colours: Red, Black and Gold
- Website: www.rhydywaun.org

Ysgol Gyfun Gymraeg Rhydywaun (sometimes shortened to YGG Rhydywaun) is a Welsh-medium secondary comprehensive school with a sixth form in Penywaun, Aberdare.

The school was established on 1 September 1995 for the increasing numbers of students attending five local Welsh-medium primary schools, who previously had to travel to secondary school in Pontypridd. It provides a Welsh-medium education for pupils from the Cynon Valley and from neighbouring Merthyr Tydfil County Borough, where there is no Welsh-medium secondary school. As of 2025, there were 1030 pupils, including 116 in the sixth form. 17% of pupils speak Welsh at home. 0.9% of pupils have special educational needs, and 12% are eligible for free school meals; both these figures are lower than the national figure for Wales.

== School inspections ==
As of October 2026, the school's last inspection by Estyn was in March 2025, with the finding that the school provides "stimulating learning experiences in a caring environment where supportive working relationships between staff and pupils form the basis of effective learning". The inspection identified strengths in literacy, supporting children with special educational needs, leadership, pastoral care, improving attendance and extra-curricular activities. Inspectors praised the school's vision and framework, called "Ffordd Rhydywaun". Areas for improvement were self-evaluation, financial management and challenge by governors. The school's previous performance rating from Estyn was Adequate, and the school at that time was rated Amber for its need for support.

== Facilities ==
Main Building (original 1995 building): The original school building opened in 1995, with a refurbishment of some areas in 2023. The refurbishment included new sixth form areas (including a sixth form cafe and two common rooms), a new cafe with retractable stadium-style seating for school assemblies or staff briefings, a new lecture theatre, 2 new science classrooms, a new Food & Nutrition classroom, a new Design & Technology classroom, and new offices for MLT. With funding from IKEA and YEPS, both sixth form common rooms were refurbished in September 2026 and the rooms were named after Aberfan and Pant Glas.

Guto Nyth Bran (opened in 2023): In 2021, Rhondda Cynon Taf announced a plan to build a new block at a cost of £12 million, adding capacity for an additional 187 pupils. The block was completed by Willmott Dixon in September 2022, and was opened under the name Guto Nyth Bran (named after the historic Welsh athlete). The new block included 6 humanities teaching classrooms, 2 versatile teaching classrooms, 2 drama classrooms, 2 music classrooms, 2 music practice rooms, a sports hall, a fitness studio, a dance studio, 6 changing rooms, a new school reception, a conference room, a staff area, staff and student toilet facilities, and a 45-space parking area with cycle storage. The block achieved a BREEAM rating of Excellent.

In 2019, a 3G sports pitch was installed on the school site for school and wider community use.

== Sport ==
The school has a rugby union team sponsored by Pennant Walters, and competes in the East Wales Premier League (North). The school's boys and girls rugby teams also compete in the annual Rosslyn Park National Schools Sevens.

== Catchment ==
The school's current catchment area is the Cynon Valley and Merthyr Tydfil. It has strong relations with five local Welsh primary schools who are part of the "Rhydywaun Cluster". These schools are Ysgol Gynradd Abercynon, Ysgol Gynradd Aberdar, Ysgol Gynradd Penderyn, Ysgol Gynradd Rhyd-y-Grug, and Ysgol Gynradd Santes Tudful.

As of 2026, over 15 buses are currently used for the school's extensive home-to-school transport network, with ~8 buses funded by Rhondda Cynon Taf Council, ~7 funded by Merthyr Tydfil Council, and 1 minibus funded by Neath Port Talbot Council.

== History ==
The school was opened on 1 September 1995 by Mid Glamorgan County Council to accommodate rising pupil numbers in Welsh primary schools across the Cynon Valley and Merthyr Tydfil.

The school has had 5 headteachers since its opening in 1995: Rhiannon Lloyd, Alun Davies, Hywel Price, Mark Jones, and Lisa Williams (current).

== Notable alumni ==
- Andrew Coombs, rugby union player
- Owen Williams, rugby union player
- Thomas Young, rugby union player
- Bailey Cutts, rugby union player
- Max Roper, writer and director
- Gwilym McGurk, musician
