= Meliden railway station =

Former railway station in Wales

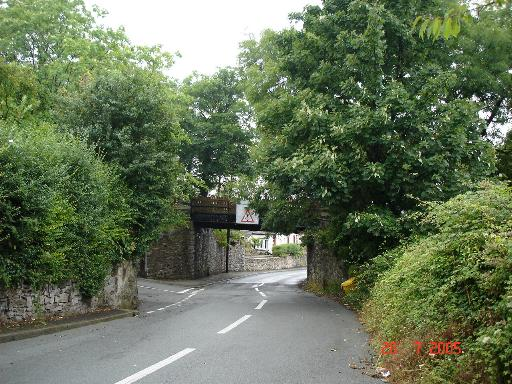

General information
- Location: Wales
- Coordinates: 53.314418°N 3.411659°W
- Grid reference: SJ060806
- Platforms: 1

Other information
- Status: Disused

History
- Pre-grouping: LNWR
- Post-grouping: LMSR

Key dates
- 28 August 1905: Opened
- 22 September 1930: Closed to passengers
- 1 April 1957: Closed for freight
Location

Meliden railway station served the mining village of Meliden, Flintshire (now Denbighshire), Wales, on the Dyserth branch line. It was used as a way of shipping minerals from the nearby quarries at Dyserth to Prestatyn. The branch line to Dyserth was opened by the LNWR in 1869, initially for mineral traffic only. A passenger service was instituted in 1905 but lasted only until 1930, when it was withdrawn by the LMS. The line remained open to serve a quarry at Dyserth until complete closure in 1973. Since closure the Prestatyn to Dyserth railway has become a nature walk. All that remains is the loading gauge and goods shed.

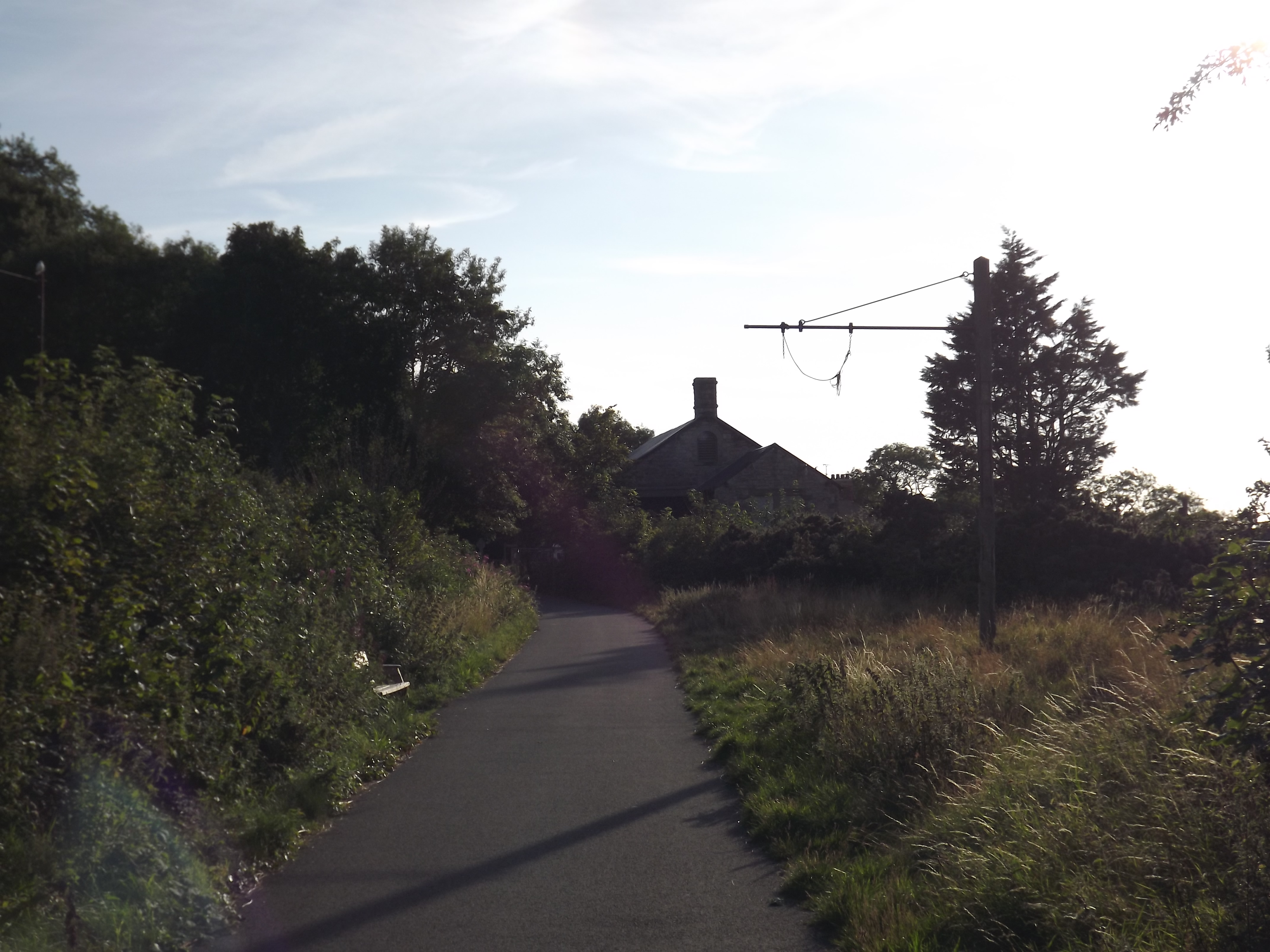
Goods shed and loading gauge

Preceding station	Disused railways	Following station
Allt-y-Graig; Line and station closed	London and North Western Railway; Dyserth Branch Line	St. Melyd Golf Links; Line and station closed
