= River Ffyddion =

Minor river in North Wales

Coordinates: 53°17′46″N 3°28′56″W

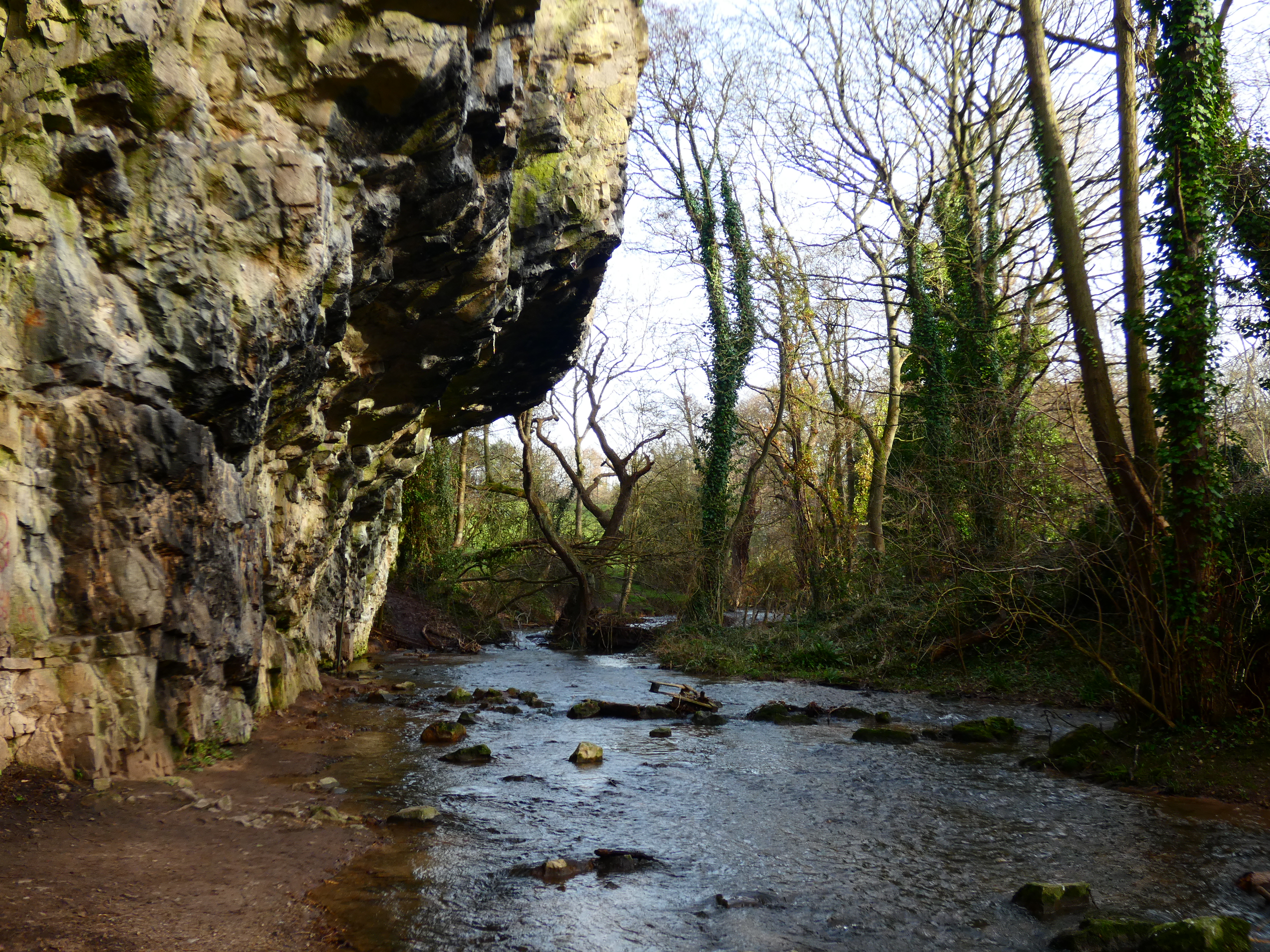
River Ffyddion in Dyserth

The River Ffyddion is a tributary of the River Clwyd in North Wales. It is this river that forms Dyserth Waterfall.

The river flows from the main body of the River Clwyd and then branches off North and goes towards Prestatyn. As this river forms a waterfall and goes through the village of Dyserth, it can be prone to flooding. An example was back in 2000.
