= Alt-y-Graig railway station =

Disused railway station in Denbighshire, Wales

Alt-y-Graig railway station Allt-y-Graig

General information
- Location: Wales
- Coordinates: 53.310410°N 3.414402°W
- Grid reference: SJ058802
- Platforms: 1

Other information
- Status: Disused

History
- Original company: LMSR

Key dates
- 1 Feb 1929: Opened as Alt-y-Craig
- 8 July 1929: Renamed Allt-y-Graig
- 22 Sep 1930: Closed
Location

Alt-y-Craig railway station (later renamed Allt-y-Graig) was an unstaffed halt at Talargoch, Denbighshire, Wales, UK, on the Dyserth branch line. Like Woodland Park further down the line, passengers would have had to access the station from a hill. The only piece of railway history that remains here is the bridge that people now walk on.

The branch line to Dyserth was opened by the LNWR in 1869, initially for mineral traffic only. A passenger service was instituted in 1905 but lasted only until 1930, when it was withdrawn by the LMS. The line remained open to serve a quarry at Dyserth until complete closure in 1973.

Preceding station	Disused railways	Following station
Dyserth; Line and station closed	London and North Western Railway; Dyserth Branch Line	Meliden; Line and station closed
