= Prestatyn Chapel Street railway station =

Former railway station in Wales

Prestatyn Chapel Street railway station Chapel Street
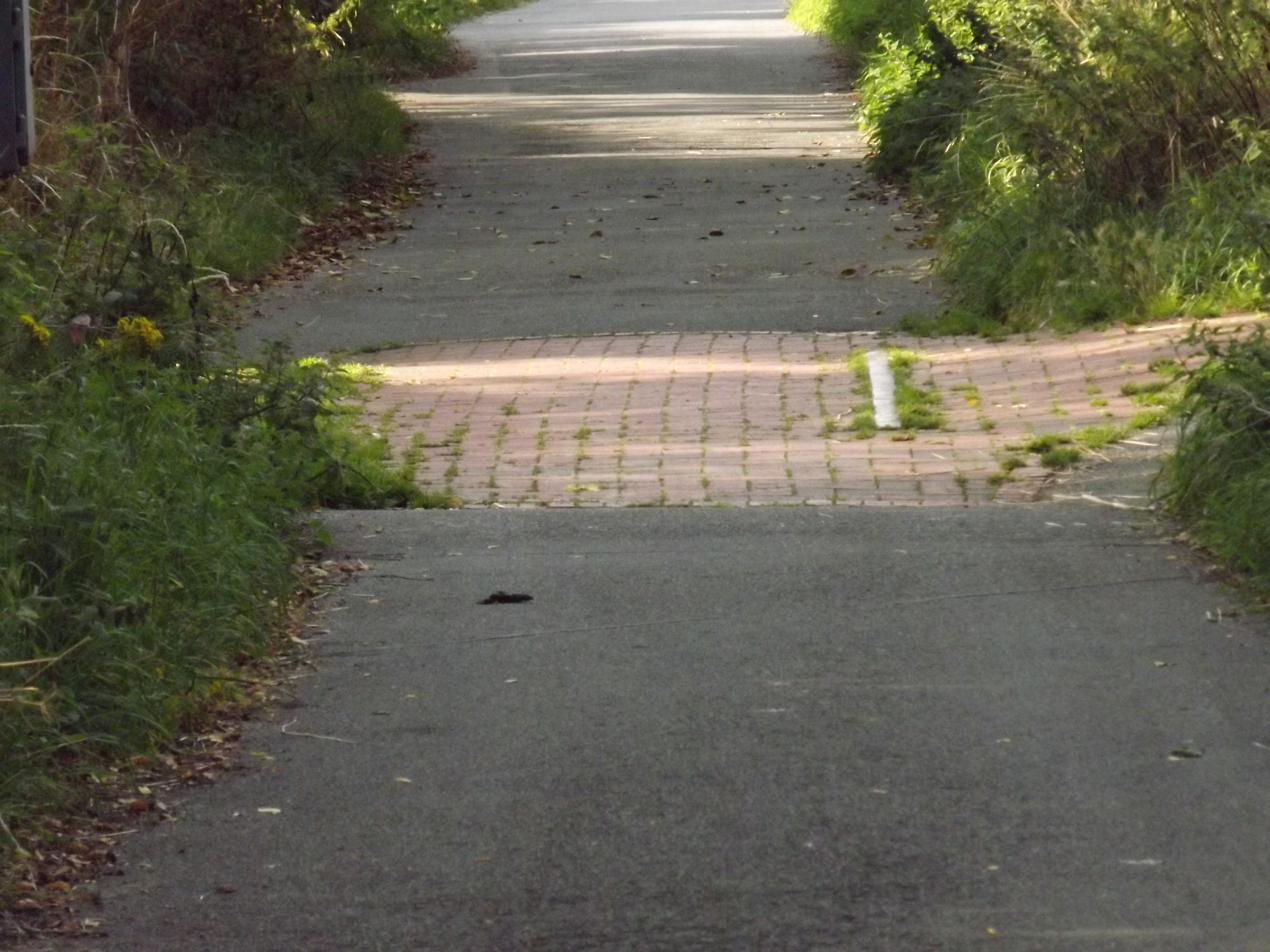
- The site of the trackbed in 2015

General information
- Location: Wales
- Coordinates: 53.331966°N 3.405648°W
- Grid reference: SJ065826
- Platforms: 1

Other information
- Status: Disused

History
- Pre-grouping: LNWR
- Post-grouping: LMSR

Key dates
- 29 January 1906: Opened
- 22 September 1930: Closed
Location

Prestatyn Chapel Street railway station was the first stop on the Dyserth branch line (now a footpath). It was the only station on the line to have a level crossing. It is also unique because pieces of track have been built into the ground as a feature of historical interest. The platform and signs have long gone, but a remaining piece of railing would have been there to separate the road and the railway.

The branch line to Dyserth was opened by the LNWR in 1869, initially for mineral traffic only. A passenger service was instituted in 1905 but lasted only until 1930, when it was withdrawn by the LMS. The line remained open to serve a quarry at Dyserth until complete closure in 1973.

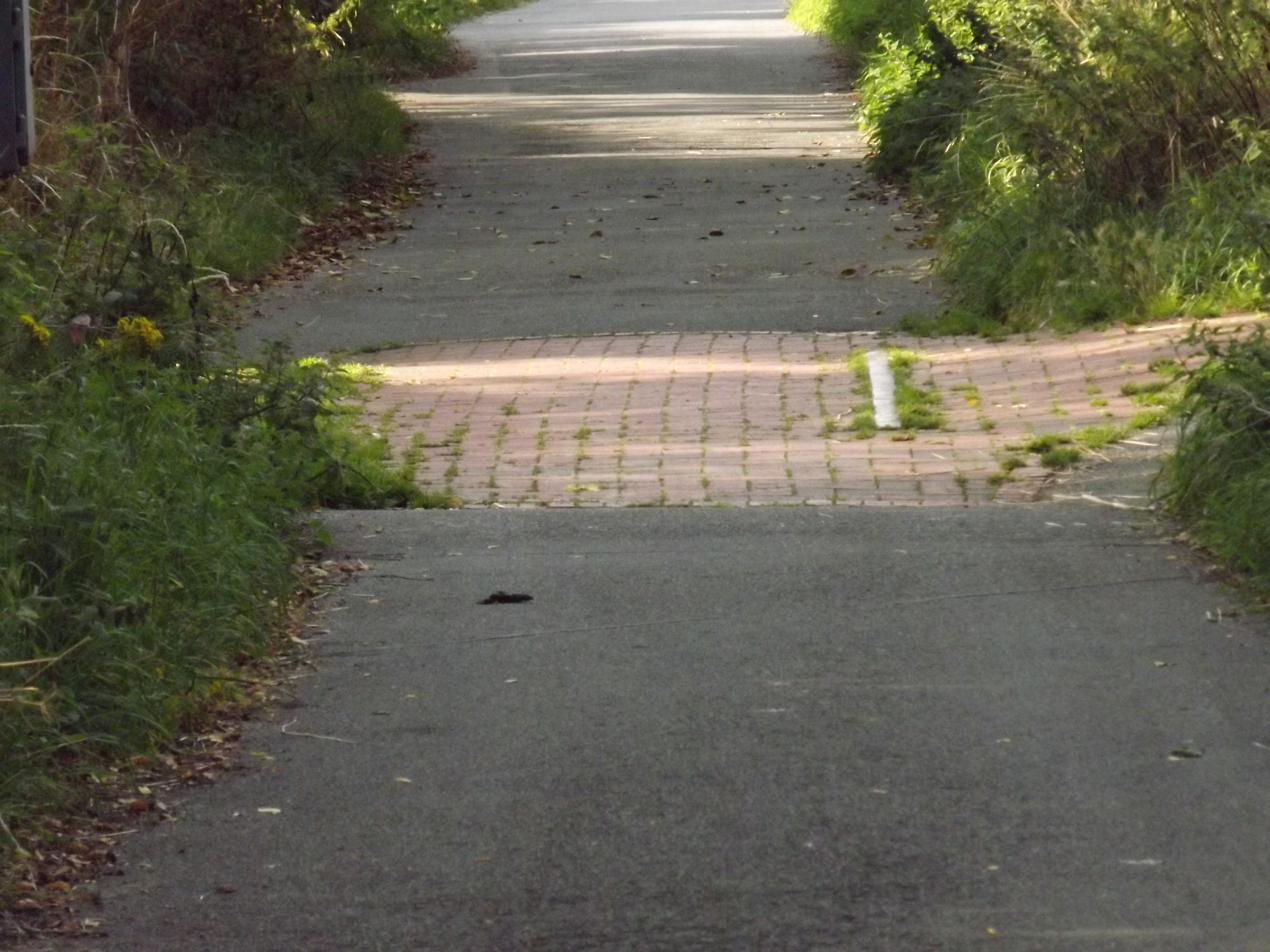

Preceding station	Disused railways	Following station
Prestatyn; Line closed, station open	London and North Western Railway; Dyserth Branch Line	Woodland Park; Line and station closed
