= Dyserth branch line =

Former Welsh railway (1869–1973)

Dyserth Branch Line

Overview
- Owner: British Railways; Previously LNWR then LMSR
- Locale: Prestatyn; Denbighshire, Wales
- Termini: Prestatyn; Dyserth
- Stations: 7

Service
- Type: Heavy Rail

History
- Opened: 1 September 1869
- Closed: 7 September 1973

Technical
- Line length: 2 miles 74 chains (4.7 km)
- Number of tracks: 1
- Character: Rural
- Track gauge: 4 ft 8 1/2 in (1,435 mm) standard gauge
- Minimum radius: 11 chains (220 m)
- Operating speed: 25 miles per hour (40 km/h)
- Maximum incline: 1 in 45

The Dyserth branch line was a short standard-gauge mineral railway between the northern end of the Clwydian Range at Dyserth and the North Wales Coast Line at Prestatyn. The line was constructed by the London and North Western Railway in 1869; it was built to carry quarried stone and coal. The rise of tourism led to the introduction of a passenger service in 1905. There were stations at Dyserth and Meliden, and basic halts were built at other stopping places. Competition from road transport led to the passenger service being withdrawn in 1930. With the eventual demise of all the mineral industries around Dyserth the entire line was closed in September 1973.

== Planning and construction ==
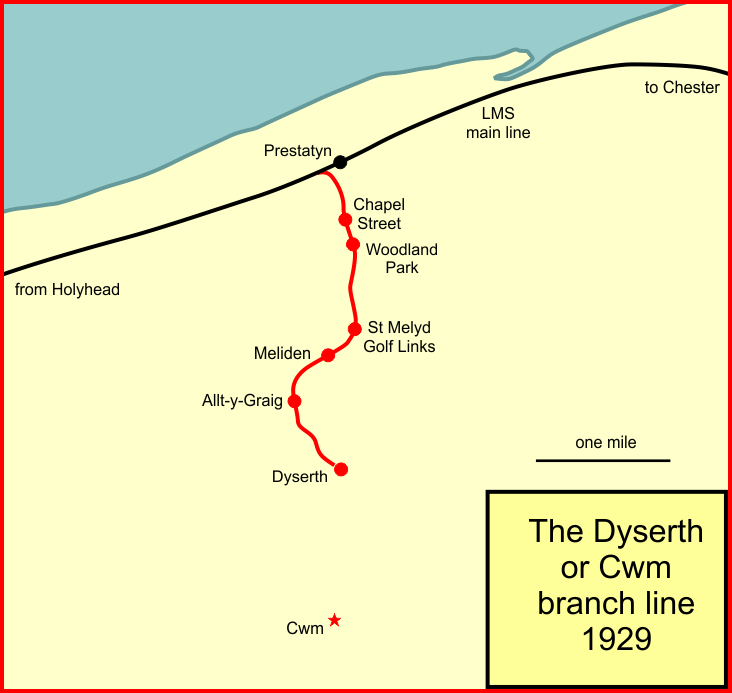
The Dyserth branch

The area between Dyserth and Cwm (about 2km to the south of Dyserth) was the site of lead and haematite mining, as well as numerous limekilns. These heavy industries shipped their ore to the River Clwyd for coastal shipping, but this soon became disadvantageous compared to other mines and quarries with rail connections. An initial proposal in 1860 was to build a mineral railway directly to Cwm in 1860 but this was never realised. On 16 July 1866 the LNWR obtained the London and North-western Railway (New Lines) Act 1866 (29 & 30 Vict. c. clxviii) giving it authority to build a branch line from its main line at Prestatyn to Dyserth. At Prestatyn the line was to connect to the Chester and Holyhead Railway which had opened throughout in 1850. In 1859 the London and North Western Railway absorbed the Chester and Holyhead Railway.

As part of the proposed work, the movable bridge over the Clwyd carrying the main line was to be improved.

In 1868 the construction of the line began after delays in land acquisition. The line was steeply graded and had sharp curves.

The branch, originally known as the Prestatyn and Cwm Line, opened to goods and mineral traffic on 1 September 1869. Shortly afterwards an intermediate goods station at Meliden was opened. Due to the steep gradients, all trains were required to be propelled up the branch, so that the locomotive was always at the lower end of the train). No run-round facility needed to be provided at Dyserth for that reason.

After a limestone quarry was opened east of Dyserth, construction began on earthworks for an extension of the line, but no track was ever laid. About 1 km of works are visible as far as Marian Mill.

Apart from short level sections through Meliden and at Dyserth station, the line climbed southwards on a significant gradient, with the steepest stretch at 1 in 45. The sharpest curve had a radius of 11 chains (220 m). These factors combined to necessitate ruling speed limits of 20 mph for trains climbing to Dyserth and 25 mph back to the main line. These limits were lowered to 15 mph over level crossings and 10 mph approaching the junction with the main line. In practice the heavy loads, curves, visibility and gradients confined speeds to around 10 mph throughout.

=== Passengers ===
Toward the end of the Victorian era, and in the Edwardian period, tourism developed rapidly, and Dyserth Castle (Note: The castle was a ruin; it was later demolished in pursuit of the quarrying operations in the area.) and the waterfalls at Cwm became important tourist destinations. In response, the LNWR started a passenger service on the branch from 28 August 1905, using a steam railmotor. (Note: A self-contained passenger coach incorporating a small steam engine, considered to be an economical way of handling small passenger volumes.) The main line junction for the branch faced away from Prestatyn station, so that a train to the branch ran to the junction and reversed direction there on to the branch.

There were two intermediate stations at first, with basic platform accommodation, but as residential development took place, additional halts were provided. At the start of the First World War a shuttle service was provided. In 1919 there were eleven journeys each way, on weekdays only.

The railmotor services were popular, and from 1911 a trailer car was added to the formation. After 1919 auto-trains (Note: Conventional locomotives operating with a driving trailer coach, from which the driver could control the locomotive; additional trailers could be incorporated in the formation.) were brought in to replace the railmotors.

Timeline

- Prestatyn Junction – branch diverged from Chester–Holyhead line.
- Chapel Street – opened 29 January 1906; closed 22 September 1930.
- Rhuddlan Road – opened 28 August 1905; renamed Woodland Park 1923; closed 22 September 1930.
- St Melyd Golf Links – opened 1 October 1923; closed 22 September 1930.
- Meliden – opened 28 August 1905; closed 22 September 1930.
- Allt-y-Graig – opened 1 February 1929; spelt Alt-y-Craig at first; closed 22 September 1930.
- Dyserth – opened 28 August 1905; closed 22 September 1930.

== Decline and closure ==
Although the train services were popular, road bus services were considered to be much more convenient by the mid 1920s. The last timetabled passenger train ran on 20 September 1930. Two enthusiasts' special trains traversed the line, the "North Wales Rail Tour" where a tank locomotive propelled three coaches to Dyserth on 2 October 1955 and "The Welshman" formed of a six car DMU on 11 October 1969.

As goods and mineral traffic on the line declined, the branch was closed to general traffic on 1 December 1951, while coal continued to be hauled as the only ordinary traffic; that too ceased on 4 May 1964. A revival in limestone quarrying at Dyserth resulted in continuation of the branch, as a private siding, until 8 September 1973. In 1974, after two special mineral trains were run to remove material at the quarry, the branch was closed completely and the track lifted shortly afterwards

== Remains ==
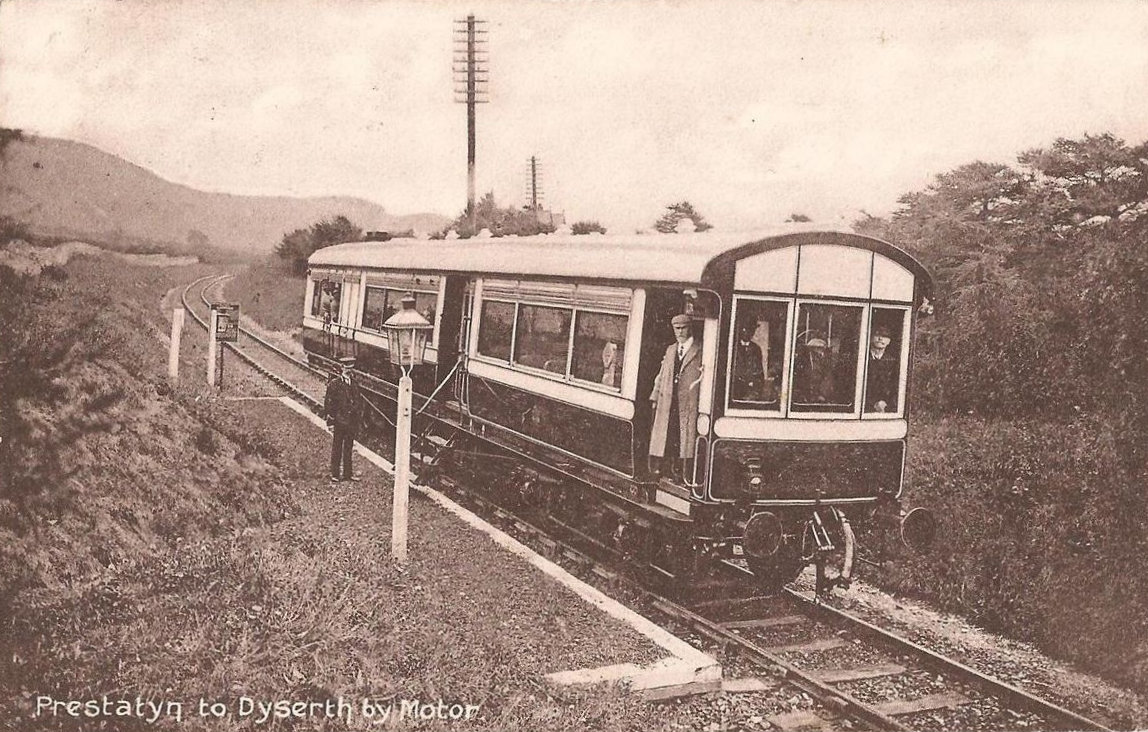
Railmotor at Rhuddlan Road halt in 1905

Much of the trackbed is now used as a footpath, which retains many historical railway points of interest. There are two pieces of track at Chapel Street, the Woodland Park Bridge, Meliden Goods Shed and Loading Gauge, and an original crane from the Dyserth Railway at the end of the walk.

== Mapping ==
- "The line and its stations". Rail Map Online.
- "The line on old OS maps with modern overlays". National Library of Scotland.
- "The whole line and closed stations on 1940s OS maps". npe Maps.
