= St. Melyd Golf Links railway station =

Former railway station in Wales

General information
- Location: Wales
- Coordinates: 53.322612°N 3.402921°W
- Grid reference: SJ066815
- Platforms: 1

Other information
- Status: Disused

History
- Original company: LMSR

Key dates
- 1 October 1923: Opened
- 22 September 1930: Closed
Location

St. Melyd Golf Links railway station was a stop on Dyserth branch line (now a footpath). Passengers would have to access from the Gwaenysgor facing side of the golf course. All that remains here is a post that has long overgrown with foliage. This post was probably used to bear the station name.

The branch line to Dyserth was opened by the LNWR in 1869, initially for mineral traffic only. A passenger service was instituted in 1905 but lasted only until 1930, when it was withdrawn by the LMS. The line remained open to serve a quarry at Dyserth until complete closure in 1973.

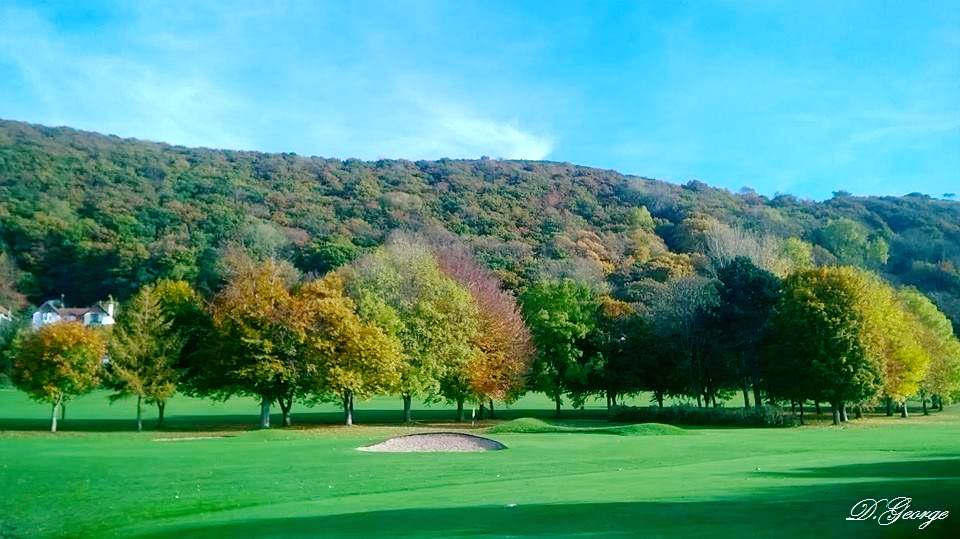
Golf Course in Meliden

Preceding station	Disused railways	Following station
Meliden; Line and station closed	London and North Western Railway; Dyserth Branch Line	Woodland Park; Line and station closed
