= Dyserth Waterfall =

Waterfall in North Wales

Coordinates: 53°18′07″N 3°25′01″W

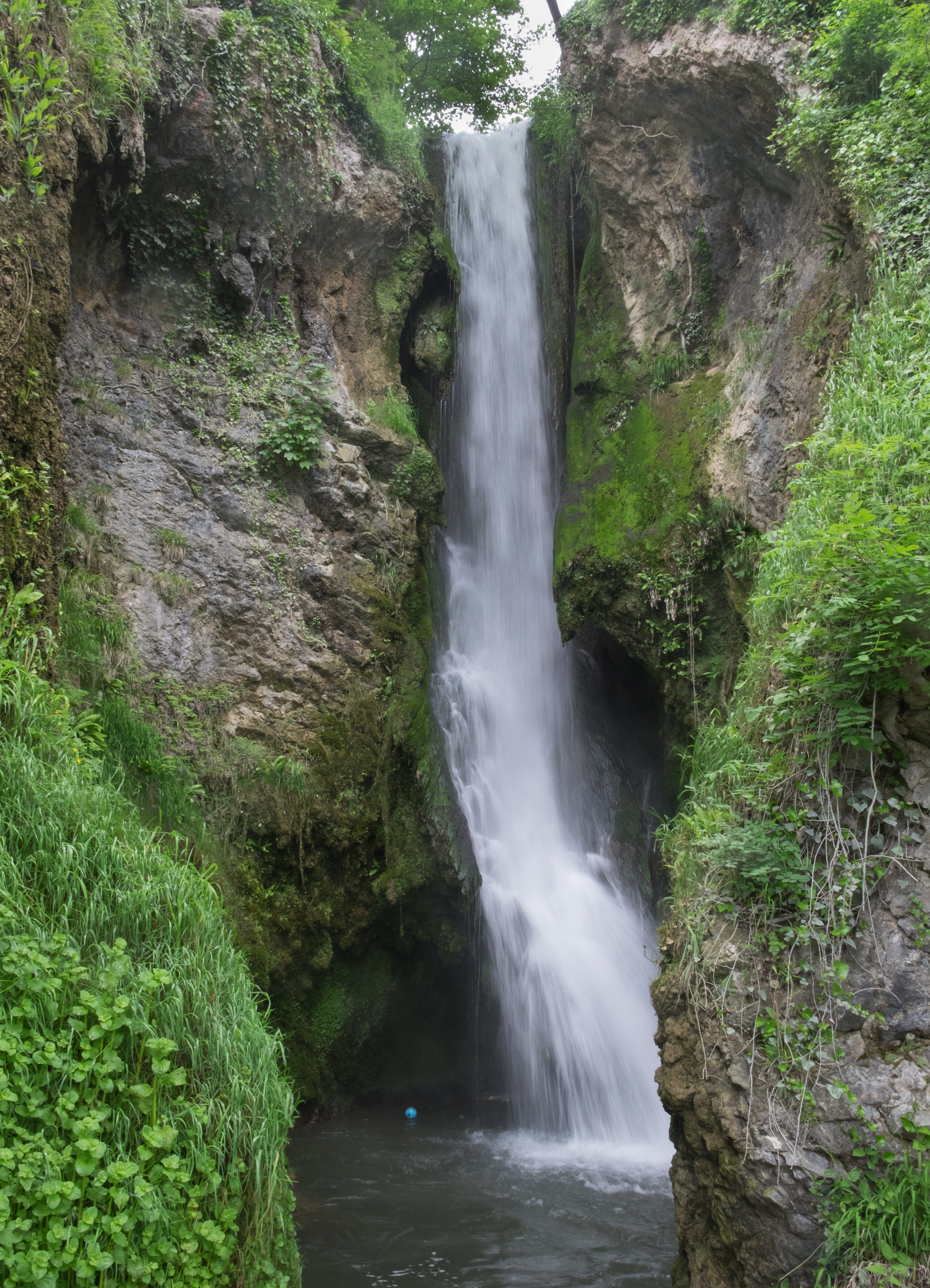
Dyserth waterfall

Dyserth Waterfall is a waterfall in Dyserth, North Wales. The River Ffyddion, a tributary of the River Clwyd, falls down a 70-foot ledge creating the waterfall. In the 1880s, mining in the area caused it to dry up, however when the mining stopped, the waterfall resumed its full flow.
