= Woodland Park railway station =

Former railway station in Wales

General information
- Location: Prestatyn; Wales
- Coordinates: 53.327618°N 3.403820°W
- Grid reference: SJ066820
- Platforms: 1

Other information
- Status: Disused

History
- Pre-grouping: LNWR
- Post-grouping: LMSR

Key dates
- 28 August 1905: Opened as Rhuddlan Road
- 11 May 1923: renamed Woodland Park
- 22 September 1930: Closed
Location

Woodland Park was an unstaffed halt on the Dyserth branch line in North Wales.

The branch opened in 1869 for mineral traffic. In 1905 the LNWR began an innovative passenger service along the branch using steam Railmotors. The halt opened with the new service. It was situated in an open country next to an overbridge carrying the road to Rhuddlan. Although the road is shown as "Meliden Road" on both maps of the era and modern maps the halt was named Rhuddlan Road. In the 1920s the substantial Woodland Park housing estate was built between the line and Prestatyn, utterly changing the character of the area. The halt was renamed Woodland Park in 1923 to reflect this new market.

Railmotors had retracting steps so conventional raised platforms were not needed. The halt was therefore built with a very short ground level platform. Initially, it had no waiting facilities whatever, but by 1910 a cabin little larger than two phone booths were provided.

The passenger service lasted only until 1930, when the LMS withdrew it. The line remained open to serve a quarry at Dyserth until its complete closure in 1973.

Since closure most of the former railway has been converted into a footpath. At the former station site visitors on this walk will notice the ground being higher up on the left when walking from Prestatyn towards Dyserth; this was probably where the platform would have been.

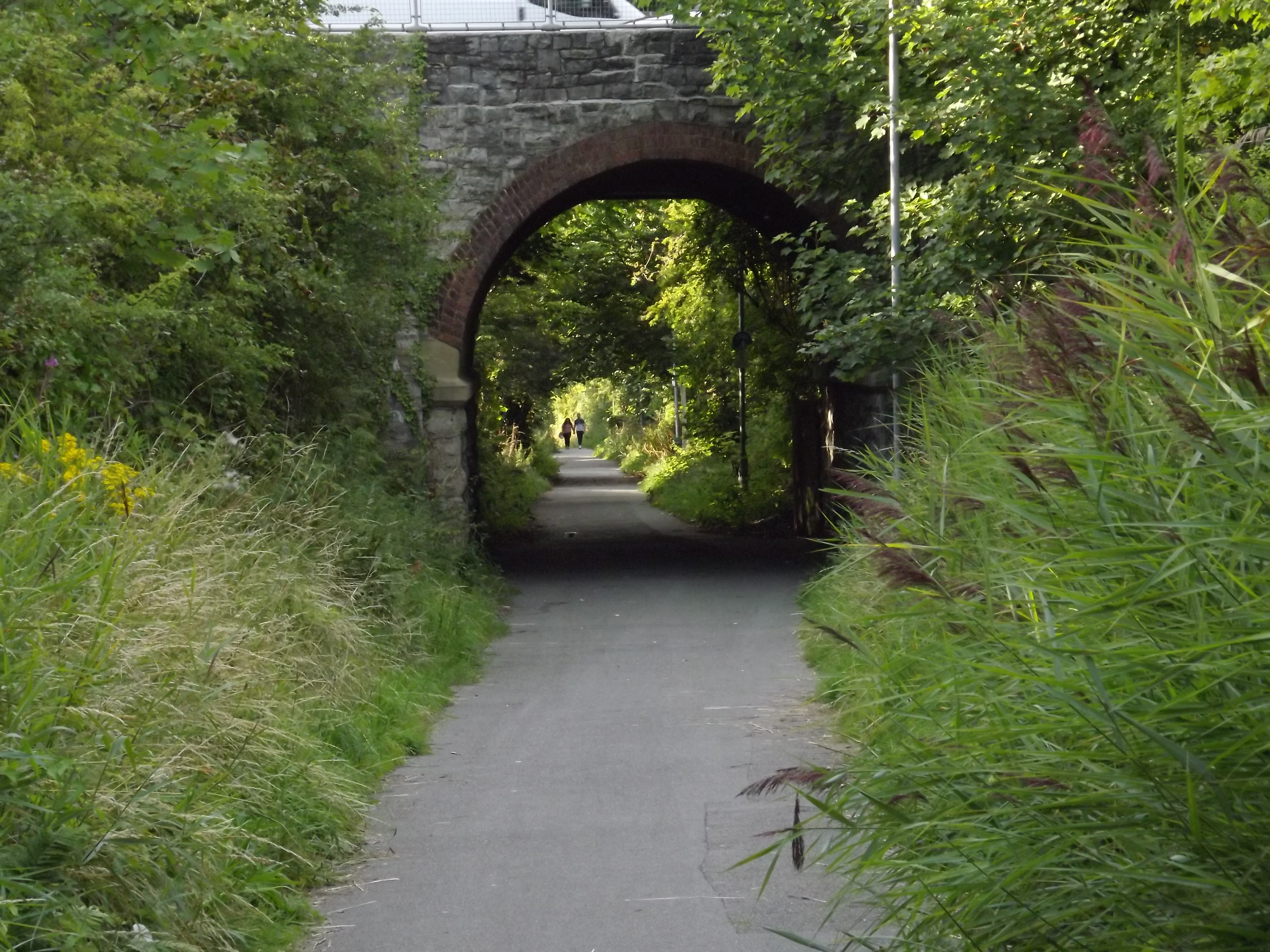

Preceding station	Disused railways	Following station
St. Melyd Golf Links; Line and station closed	London and North Western Railway; Dyserth Branch Line	Chapel Street; Line and station closed
