= Prestatyn railway station =

Railway station in Denbighshire, Wales

Prestatyn
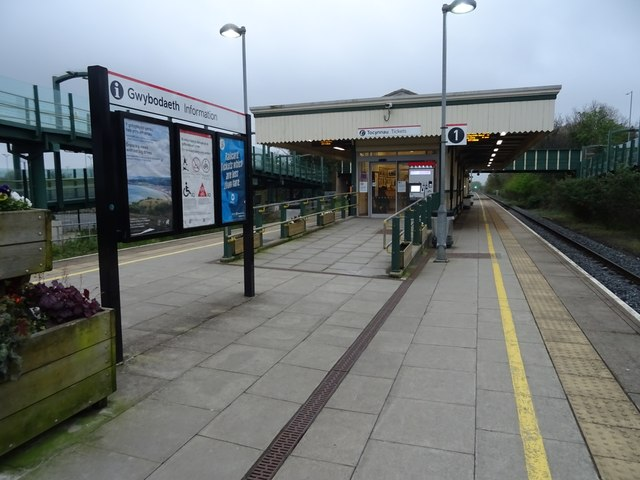
- Prestatyn viewed from platform 1

General information
- Location: Prestatyn, Denbighshire; Wales
- Coordinates: 53.336°N 3.407°W
- Grid reference: SJ063830
- Managed by: Transport for Wales
- Platforms: 2

Other information
- Station code: PRT
- Classification: DfT category D

History
- Opened: 1 May 1848; 178 years ago (original station); 28 February 1897; 129 years ago (current station)
- Closed: 28 February 1897; 129 years ago (original station)
- Rebuilt: 1979 (renovation); 1997, 2011–18 (refurbishment)

Key dates
- 1848: 1st station opened
- 1897: current station opened

Passengers
- 2020/21: ▼94,156
- 2021/22: ▲0.252 million
- 2022/23: ▲0.289 million
- 2023/24: ▲0.341 million
- 2024/25: ▲0.369 million
Location
Notes
- Passenger statistics from the Office of Rail and Road

Prestatyn railway station on the North Wales Coast Line serves the town of Prestatyn in North Wales.

The station was built on the Chester and Holyhead Railway (CHR) line and opened on 1 May 1848. The coming of the railway is credited with bringing large numbers of tourists and prosperity to the town. When the CHR was acquired by the London and North Western Railway (LNWR), further expansion occurred at Prestatyn and the station became a junction for a branch line to Dyserth. In the 1890s, the LNWR built the current station.

Passenger numbers dipped significantly during the mid 20th century. After British Rail tried to close the station in the 1960s, the line and station were rationalised but remained operational. In 1979, the station was renovated.

It is managed by Transport for Wales, who operate services from Cardiff Central, Birmingham International and Manchester Piccadilly to Holyhead and Llandudno; other services are provided by Avanti West Coast between Holyhead and London Euston.

== History ==
=== 19th century ===
Prestatyn station was built by the Chester and Holyhead Railway (CHR) on its line from Chester to the port of Holyhead on Anglesey. The route, engineered by Robert Stephenson, ran mainly along the coastline of North Wales. A contract for the station's construction was awarded to the Hinson Brothers.

On 1 May 1848, Prestatyn's first station opened when the CHR opened its line through to Bangor. It comprised a single slate-roofed two-storey brick building and adjacent shed on its westbound platform. The site is roughly 100 m to the east of the present station.

The station was the junction for a branch line to Dyserth opened by the LNWR in 1869 and intended for mineral traffic. In 1905, a passenger service was started that lasted until 1930, when it was withdrawn by the London, Midland and Scottish Railway (LMS). The line remained open to serve a quarry until its closure in 1973. Since then, much of the former line has been reused as a footpath.

On 1 January 1859, the North Wales Coast Line and its stations became a part on the London and North Western Railway (LNWR), who had acquired the CHR. The LNWR placed a great emphasis on its services between London and Ireland via the ferries at Holyhead. Traffic expanded considerably during the late 1800s and the company began a major expansion. In 1897 the tracks through the town were quadrupled and the current station was constructed.

The new station had prefabricated modular buildings manufactured by the LNWR at their works in Crewe. Three prefabricated buildings were constructed, all 3.4 m wide and 2 m long. Timber trestles and frames supported the prefabricated units and 600mm thick concrete slabs were used for parts of the foundations to support brick footings, fireplaces and chimneys.

One of the 1890s buildings is still standing on what was the line towards Chester. It had timber beam canopies along the south and west sides, three internal rooms with fireplaces and toilet facilities. Two similar structures have since been demolished, one having been located on the north-westerly line (towards Holyhead) and the third being built upon yet another platform. On 28 February 1897, the new station was opened and the old station was closed.

=== 20th century ===
In 1901, further alterations to the station layout became necessary; the work was carried out by contractors Parnell & Son. The former 'up' platform was redeveloped into an island platform between the railway tracks. Another timber canopy was installed on the station building's north side.

Prestatyn station suffered from diminishing passenger numbers after the Second World War. It was threatened with closure during Beeching cuts in the 1960s but objections from the community led to it being reprieved.

The station and line were then rationalised, the four tracks were cut to two in the 1980s, and the island platform became the only one to remain in use. In 1979, the station was rebuilt in a style sympathetic to the original structure. Two of the three prefabricated buildings were demolished. In January 1997, the remaining station buildings were given Grade II listed building status.

In autumn 2011, Prestatyn was the first of six stations in Wales to receive an access footbridge and lift, repaved accessible platforms, in Network Rail's 'Access for All’ programme. In 2012, the station buildings were refurbished. During the first half of 2018, new signalling systems were installed along the North Wales Coast Line leading to the closure of the nearby signal box when control was centralised to the Wales Rail Operating Centre.

== Facilities ==
The station ticket office is staffed seven days a week. A self-service ticket machine is provided for use outside opening hours and collecting pre-paid tickets. Live train running information is via digital passenger information displays.

== Services ==
The hourly Manchester to Llandudno and Birmingham International/Cardiff to Holyhead services call here, giving the station two trains each hour to Chester and Llandudno Junction. On weekdays, Avanti West Coast operate five trains each way per day between Crewe and Holyhead, one of which runs only to Bangor. On Saturdays there is one train each way per day between London Euston and Holyhead, with two trains each way from Crewe to Holyhead, one of which continues to Birmingham New Street. A few early morning and late night trains run to/from Crewe, rather than Cardiff or Birmingham.

On Sundays, there is an hourly service each way from mid-morning (to Holyhead westbound and Crewe eastbound) and two trains to/from Manchester. There are three trains per day each way between Crewe and Holyhead, one of which continues to London Euston.

Preceding station	National Rail	Following station
Flint	Transport for Wales; North Wales Coast Line	Rhyl
Flint	Avanti West Coast; Holyhead/Bangor–London Euston	Rhyl

== Awards ==
Keep Wales Tidy - Best Kept Staffed Station Award (2017)

== Gallery ==
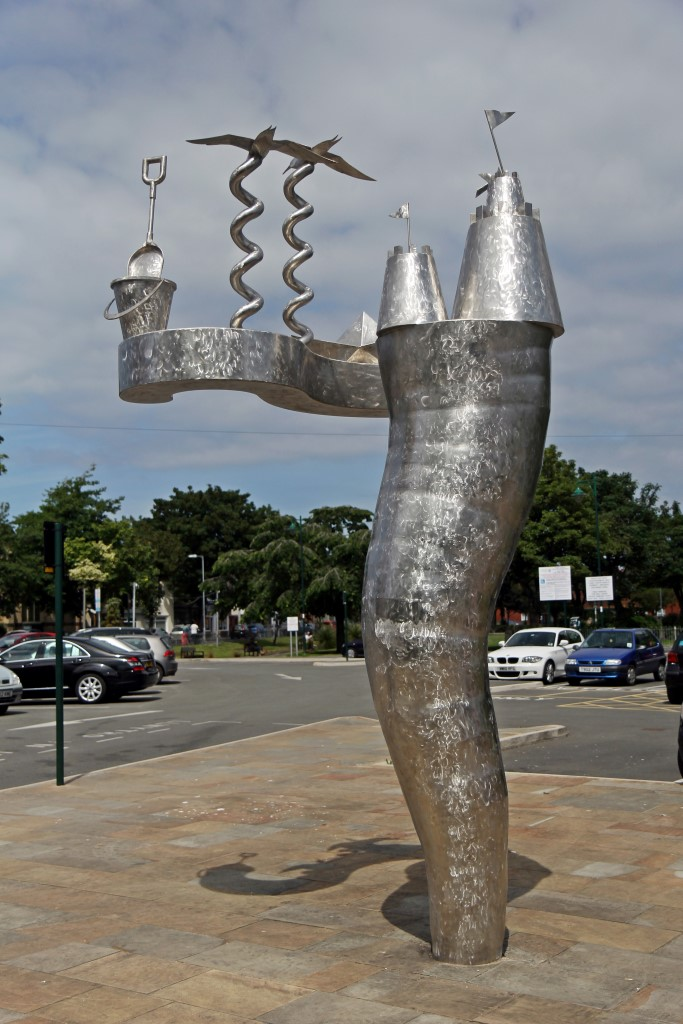
Sculpture at the station entrance by Denis O'Connor Sculpture Works

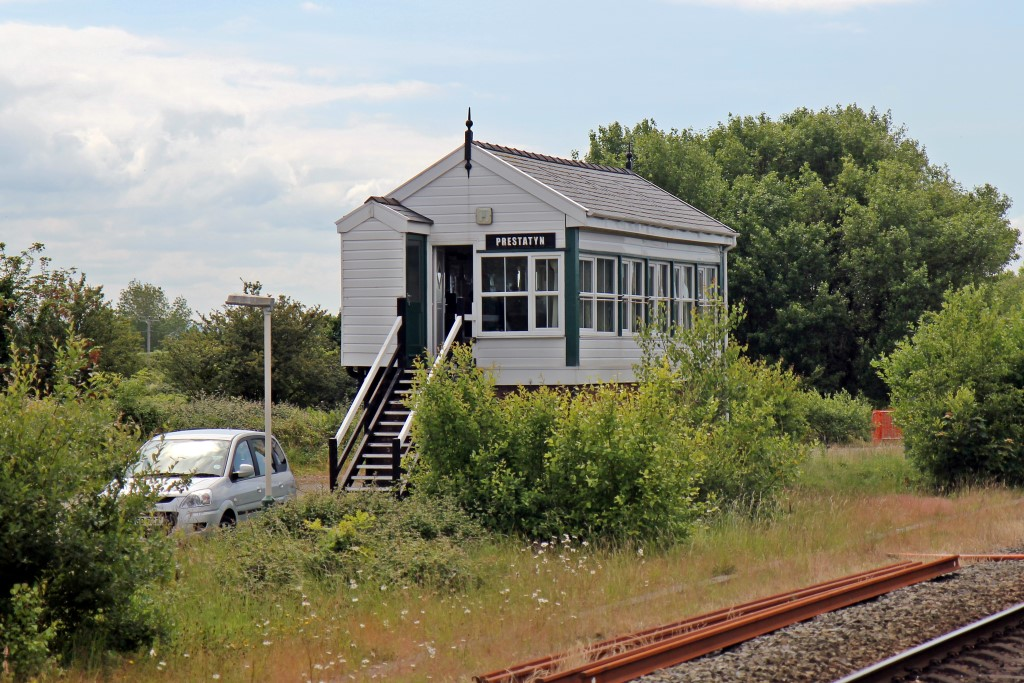
Prestatyn signal box

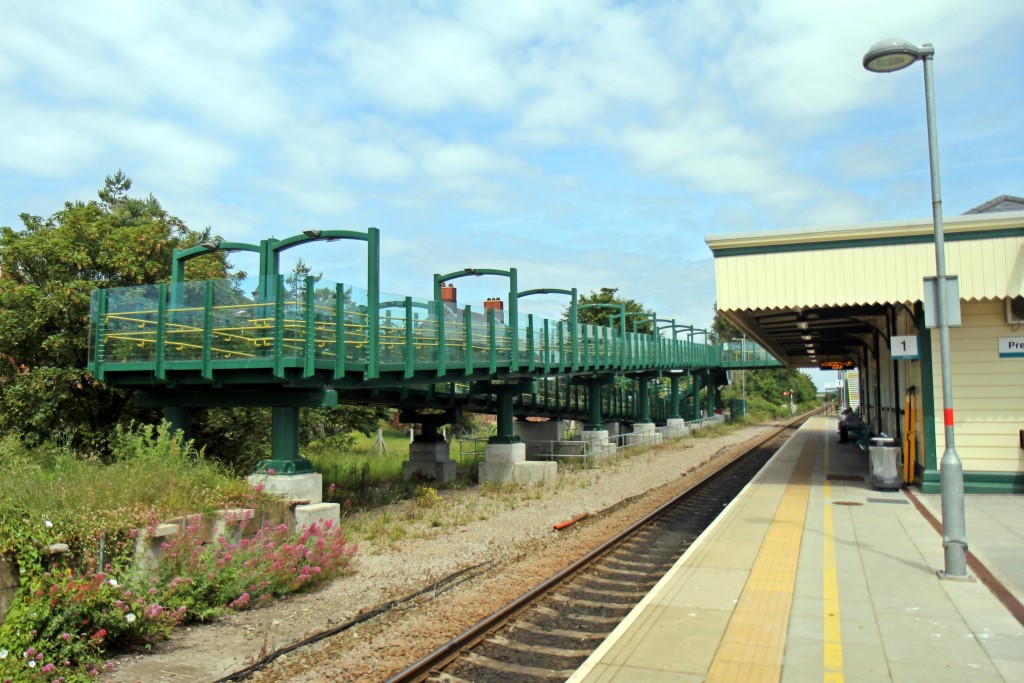
Part of the new footbridge

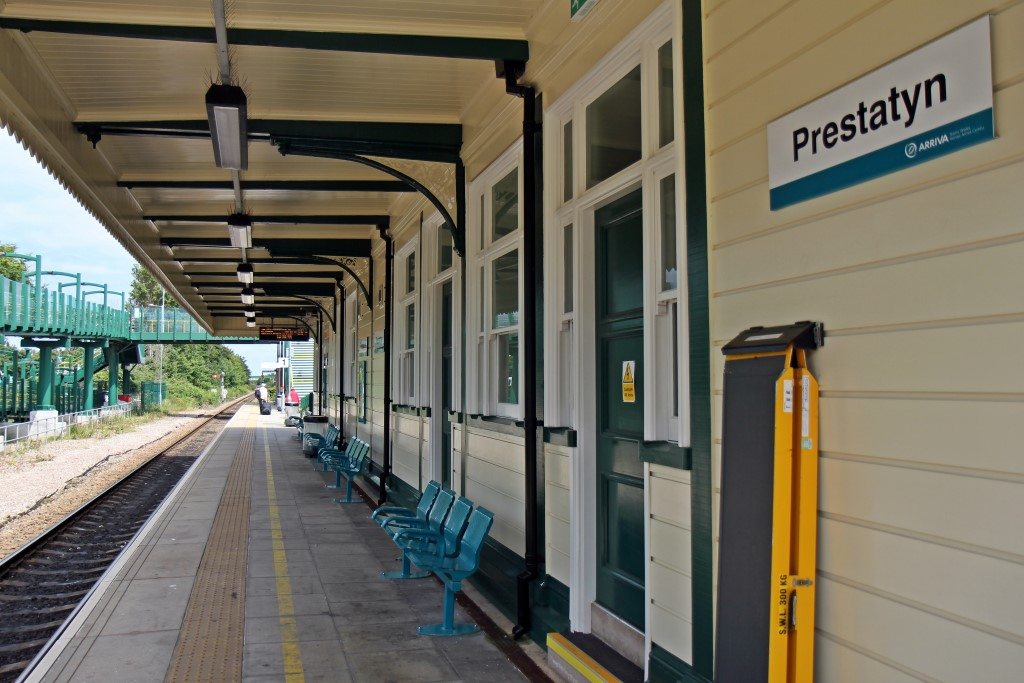
On the platform
