= Dyserth railway station =

Railway station in Wales (1905–1964)

Dyserth
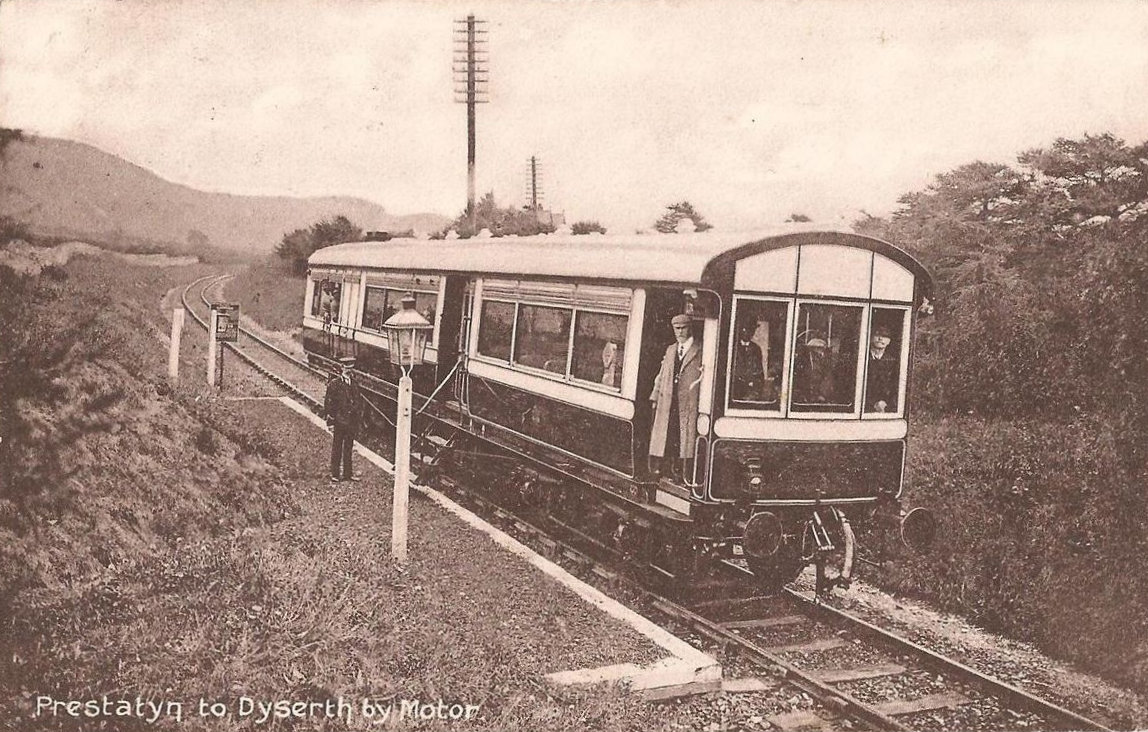

General information
- Location: Wales
- Coordinates: 53.30279°N 3.406773°W
- Grid reference: SJ063793
- Platforms: 1

Other information
- Status: Disused

History
- Pre-grouping: LNWR
- Post-grouping: LMSR

Key dates
- 28 August 1905: Opened
- 22 September 1930: Closed to passengers
- 1951: Station closed to parcel traffic and de-staffed
- 4 May 1964: Station closed completely
- 1973: Line through station site closed
Location

Dyserth railway station served the village of Dyserth, Flintshire (now Denbighshire), Wales. It was the southern terminus of the 2 miles 70 chains (4.6 km) Dyserth branch, most of which is now a public footpath. At its peak Dyserth had passengers in the thousands. In 1930 the line and station closed for passengers in the face of road competition. At one point fourteen trains a day had shuttled along the line. Although the station has long been demolished, a crane from the station has been installed at the end of the walk as a feature of historical interest, as have two pieces of track at Chapel Street.

The branch line to Dyserth was opened by the LNWR in 1869, initially for mineral traffic only. A passenger service was instituted in 1905 but lasted only until 1930, when it was withdrawn by the LMS. Despite being closed the station site was host to two LMS caravans from 1934 to 1939. The line remained open to serve a quarry at Dyserth until complete closure in 1973.

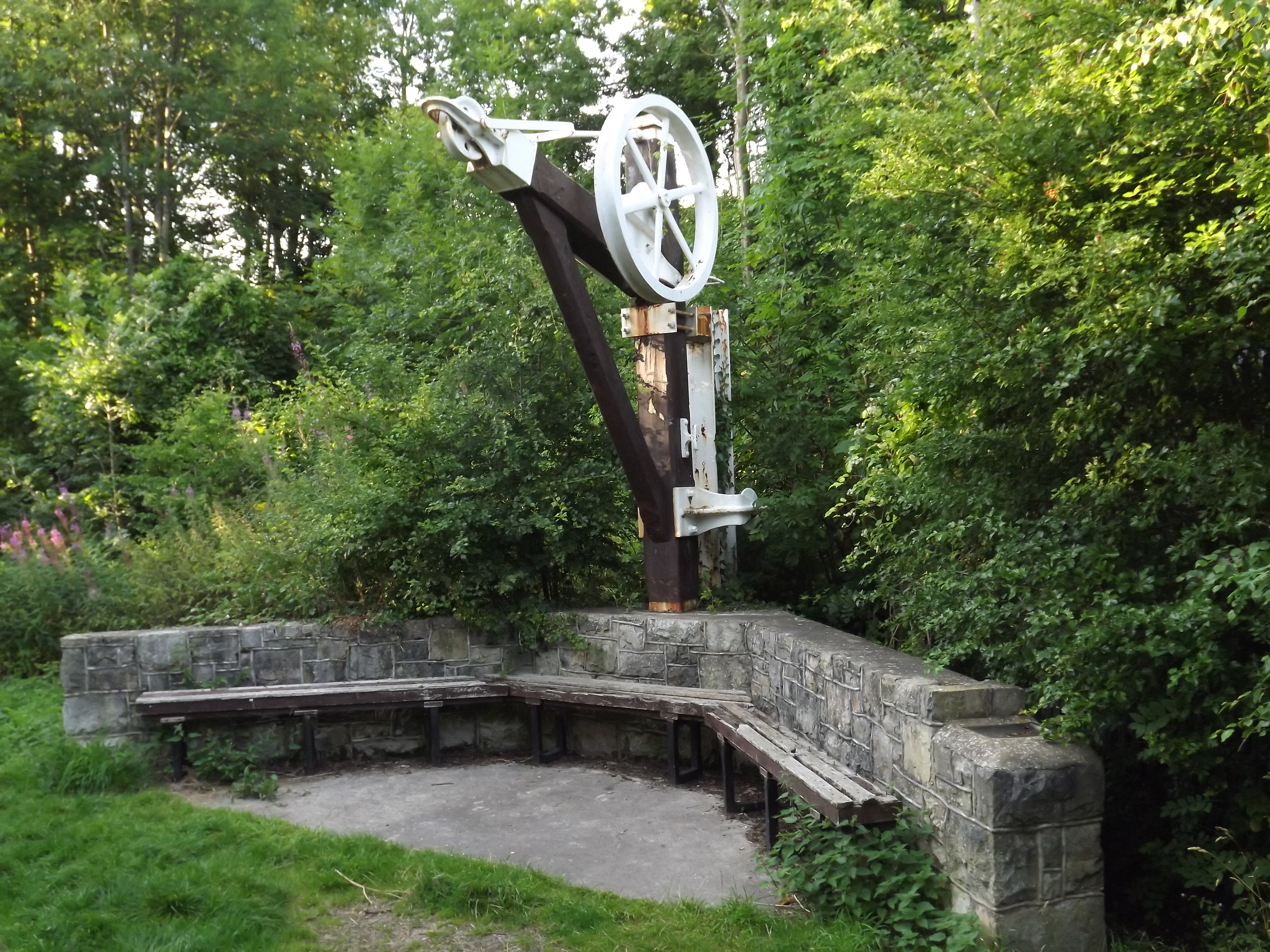
crane

Preceding station	Disused railways	Following station
Terminus	London and North Western Railway; Dyserth Branch Line	Allt-y-Graig; Line and station closed
