= Graig Fawr =

Protected area in Clwyd, Wales

Coordinates: 53°18′43″N 3°24′48″W

Graig Fawr (also known in English as Meliden Mountain) is a Site of Special Scientific Interest in the preserved county of Clwyd, north Wales, now in Denbighshire. It is 153 metres (502 feet) high and located between Meliden and Dyserth, marking the northern end of the Clwydian Range. It is owned by the National Trust.

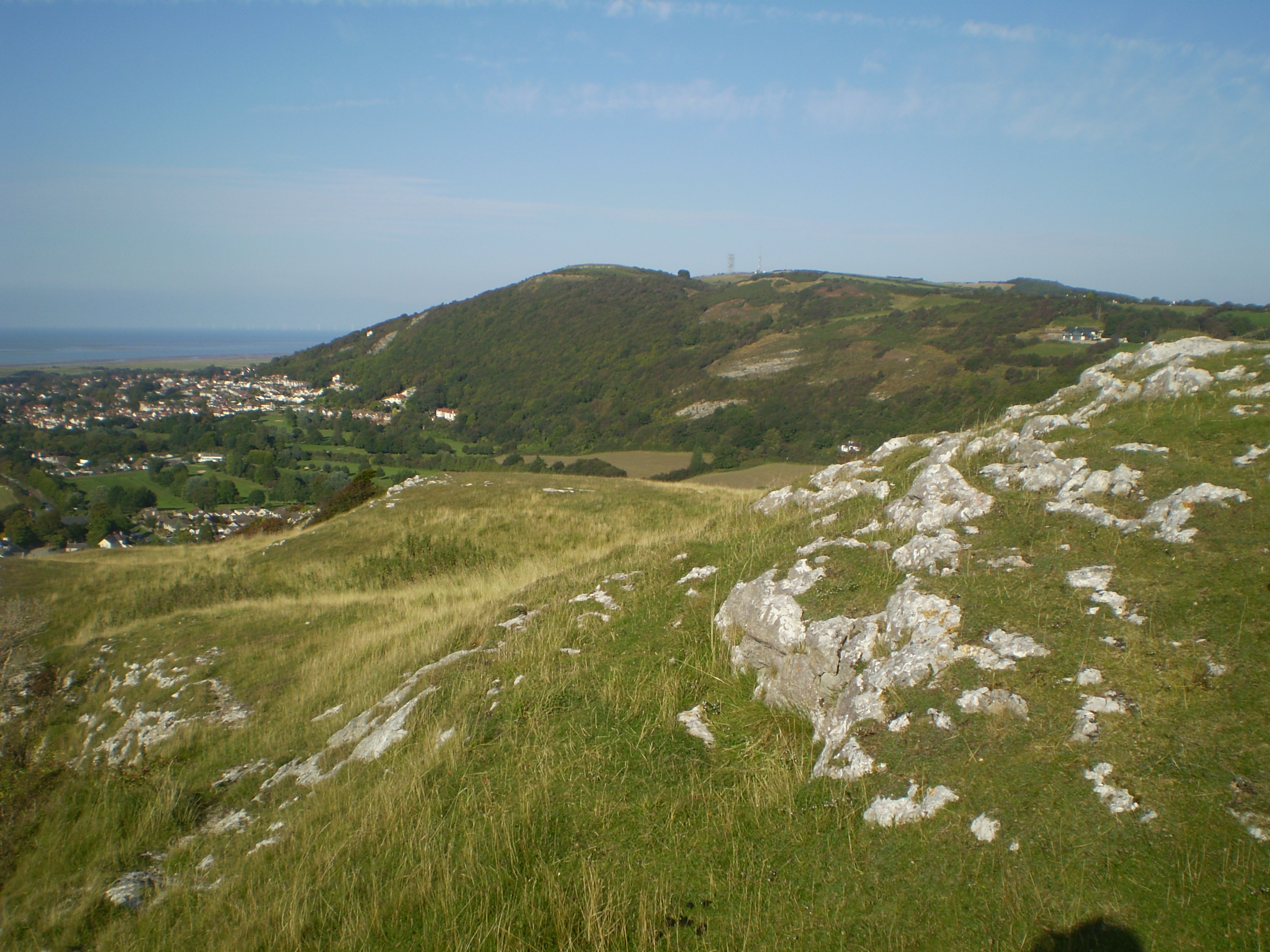
Prestatyn Hillside from Graig Fawr

== See also ==
- List of Sites of Special Scientific Interest in Clwyd
