= Meliden =

Village in Denbighshire, Wales

Coordinates: 53.315°N 3.412°W

Meliden: Welsh: Alltmelyd
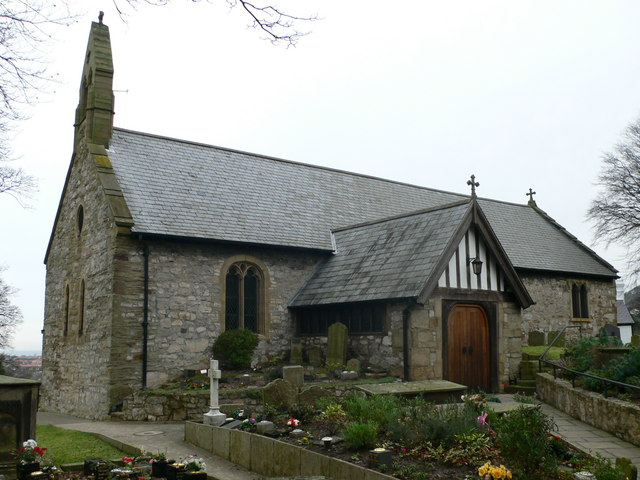
- St Melyd's church, Meliden

- Location within Denbighshire
- Population: 2,066
- OS grid reference: SJ059807
- Community: Prestatyn
- Principal area: Denbighshire
- Country: Wales
- Sovereign state: United Kingdom
- Post town: PRESTATYN
- Postcode district: LL19
- Dialling code: 01745
- Police: North Wales
- Fire: North Wales
- Ambulance: Welsh
- UK Parliament: Clwyd East
- Senedd Cymru – Welsh Parliament: Vale of Clwyd

Meliden (Welsh: Alltmelyd) is a village between Prestatyn and Dyserth in Denbighshire, Wales. It grew up around the locality of lead mines and limestone quarries. The placename "Meliden" has variously been claimed to be derived from that of Bishop Melitus or St. Melyd (the village has the church of St. Melyd as its main place of worship); its Welsh placename, "Alltmelyd", means "wooded hill of Melyd". The railway between Prestatyn and Dyserth, long since lifted and formerly with sidings in the village, is now a public walkway and nature trek. It has a 9-hole golf course, which is split in half by the former railway/nature walk. The local school, St. Melyd Primary, is a feeder school to the High School, Prestatyn.

Meliden's football club, Meliden F.C., reformed in 2008, joining the Clwyd Football League.

Above the village is the limestone hill of Graig Fawr (153 metres, 502 feet) which belongs to the National Trust. The views from the crag include the coast from Llandudno to the Wirral, Snowdonia, neighbouring Moel Hiraddug, and many other hills of North Wales.

== History ==
In 1086, Meliden was recorded in the Domesday Book as a small settlement within the hundred of Ati's Cross and in the county of Cheshire.
