= Prestatyn =

Coastal town in Denbighshire, Wales

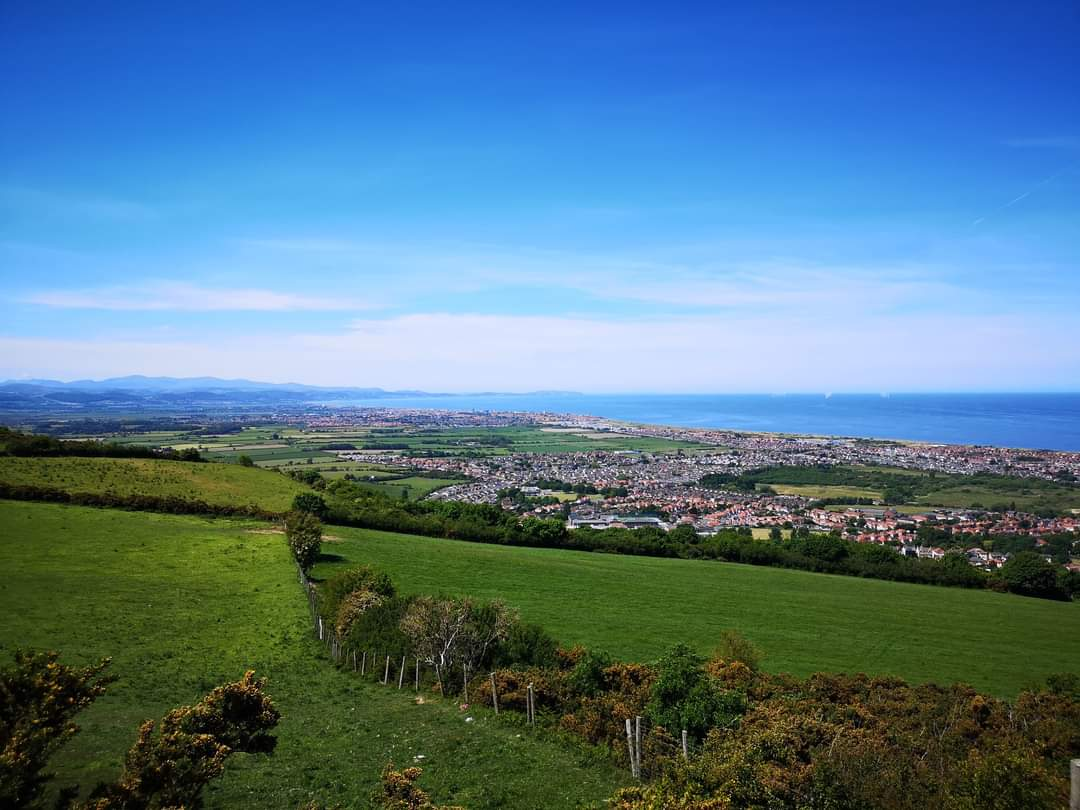
- Overview of Prestatyn, 2020

- Location within Denbighshire
- Population: 19,085 (2021)
- OS grid reference: SJ065825
  - Cardiff: 171.9m
  - London: 233.9m
- Community: Prestatyn
- Principal area: Denbighshire
- Preserved county: Clwyd
- Country: Wales
- Sovereign state: United Kingdom
- Post town: PRESTATYN
- Postcode district: LL19
- Dialling code: 01745
- Police: North Wales
- Fire: North Wales
- Ambulance: Welsh
- UK Parliament: Clwyd East
- Senedd Cymru – Welsh Parliament: Vale of Clwyd
- List of places UK Wales Denbighshire 53.331°N 3.405°W Map of the community

Prestatyn (/prɛˈstætɪn/; Welsh pronunciation) is a seaside town and community in Denbighshire, Wales. Historically a part of Flintshire, it is located on the Irish Sea coast, to the east of Rhyl. Prestatyn has a population of 19,085.

== Origin of name ==
The name Prestatyn derives from the Old English prēosta (the genitive plural of prēost 'priest') and tūn ('homestead'), and thus means 'the homestead of the priests'. It was recorded in the Domesday Book as Prestetone. Unlike similarly derived names in England, which generally lost their penultimate syllable and became Preston, the village's name developed a typically Welsh emphasis on the penultimate syllable and a modification of 'ton' to 'tyn', as also happened at Mostyn.

== History ==
=== Prehistory ===
There is evidence that the current town location has been occupied since prehistoric times. Prehistoric tools found in the caves of Graig Fawr, in the nearby village of Meliden, have revealed the existence of early human habitation in the area.

=== Roman ===
Among a housing estate in the north of the town, there is a Roman bathhouse which may have been part of a fort on the road from Chester to Caernarfon. It was probably built by the Twentieth Legion around 120, and expanded around 150, as shown by stamped tiles with either the legion's name, or its boar insignia. Its cold plunge-bath was fed by a wooden aqueduct channel, while, nearby, the traces of timber buildings, as well as three bronze-smiths' workshops, have been found. The bathhouse was found in 1934, and when the housing estate was built in 1984, it was excavated and preserved. However, much of the rest of Roman Prestatyn has been destroyed as houses have been built over unexcavated land, so that the "Prestatyn Roman Bathhouse" is the only visible remnant of it.

=== Medieval ===
Prestatyn was included in the Domesday Book since it was at that time under English control. An earth mound, visible in fields to the east of the railway station, beyond Nant Hall, marks the site of an early wooden Prestatyn castle, probably built by the Norman Robert de Banastre about 1157, which was destroyed by the Welsh under Owain Gwynedd in 1167. The Banastre family then moved to Bank Hall in Lancashire.

The town appears to have been primarily a fishing village for hundreds of years. The beginning and end of High Street today mark the location of two 'maenolau' (or manor houses) called Pendre (translated as "end of" or "top of town") and Penisadre ("lower end of town").

=== 19th century to present ===
The town's population remained at less than 1,000 until the arrival of the railways and the holidaymakers in the 19th and 20th centuries. "Sunny Prestatyn" became famous for its beach, clean seas and promenade entertainers, and visiting for a bathe was considered very healthy by city-dwelling Victorians. During the Second World War the holiday camps were used as billets for British soldiers, many of whom were also sent to live with locals.

Prestatyn was the home of the first UK Kwik Save supermarket in 1965, as well as the firm's business headquarters. The Kwik Save store was renamed Somerfield following a takeover in 2007, and was finally demolished in 2008 when surrounding land was bought by Tesco.

The North Hoyle Offshore Wind Farm was opened in 2003. Situated in Liverpool Bay, 5 miles (8 km) off the coast of Prestatyn, it was the UK's first major offshore wind farm. It has 30 wind turbines with a combined maximum capacity of 60 megawatts – enough to power 40,000 homes.

== Facilities and attractions ==
Although Prestatyn remains a tourist destination and resort town, the town is diversifying in response to the decline of the British seaside holiday.

The town is at the northern end of the Offa's Dyke Path, although not on Offa's Dyke itself. It also marks the eastern end of the North Wales Path, a long-distance coastal route to Bangor, and the western end of the Clwydian Way. Other attractions include the remains of Roman baths and the nearby Neolithic mound, the Gop.

Pontin's Holiday Centre was the location for a 1973 film of the popular British TV series, On the Buses.

The national trust owned limestone hill Graig Fawr.

=== Nova ===
Previously named the Lido, this leisure and entertainment complex was established in 1923 with an outdoor seawater swimming pool and ballroom. A £4.4 million pound investment in 2015 has seen the redevelopment of this complex to include a new facade, entrance and reception area as well as a new bar/restaurant, 60 station fitness suite and children's soft play area.

== Governance ==
There are two tiers of local government covering Prestatyn: Prestatyn Town Council and Denbighshire County Council.

For elections to Denbighshire County Council the town is divided into five electoral wards, namely Prestatyn Central, Prestatyn East, Prestatyn Meliden, Prestatyn North and Prestatyn South West. For elections to Prestatyn Town Council the town is divided into six wards (with Prestatyn North county ward being subdivided into North and North West). Eighteen town councillors are elected.

The town was in the Delyn parliamentary constituency from 1983 to 1997, then in Vale of Clwyd until 2024, when it became a part of Clwyd East.

=== Administrative history ===
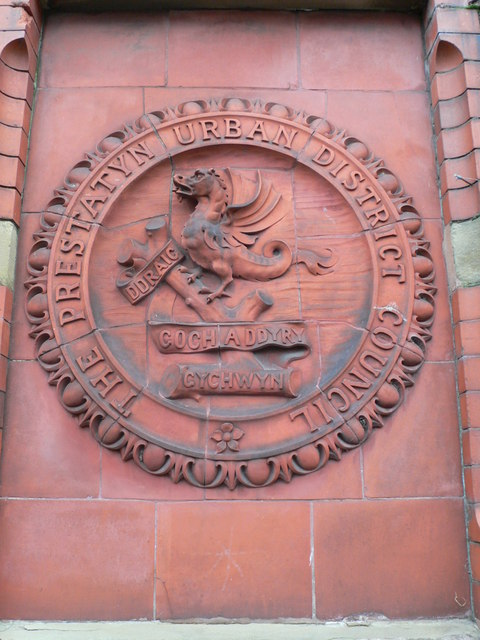
Plaque on the former Urban District Council Offices on Nant Hall Road, built 1903.

Prestatyn was formerly part of the ancient parish of Meliden (also called Meliden with Prestatyn) in the historic county of Flintshire. When elected parish and district councils were established in 1894 Meliden was given a parish council and included in the St Asaph Rural District. A separate urban district called Prestatyn was created from part of Meliden parish in 1896. The urban district council built itself a headquarters on Nant Hall Road in 1903. Prestatyn Urban District was abolished in 1974, with its area becoming a community instead. District-level functions passed to Rhuddlan Borough Council, which was in turn replaced by Denbighshire County Council in 1996.

== Transport ==
=== Rail ===
Prestatyn railway station is on the North Wales Coast Line which connects the town with Holyhead to the west and Chester to the east. It is run by Transport for Wales.

=== Bus ===
Bus services are provided by Arriva Buses Wales, which visit Rhyl, Flint, Chester, Colwyn Bay and Llandudno.

=== Road ===
Prestatyn is on the A547 and A548 roads, and is about six miles (ten kilometres) from the A55.

== Notable people ==
See Category:People from Prestatyn

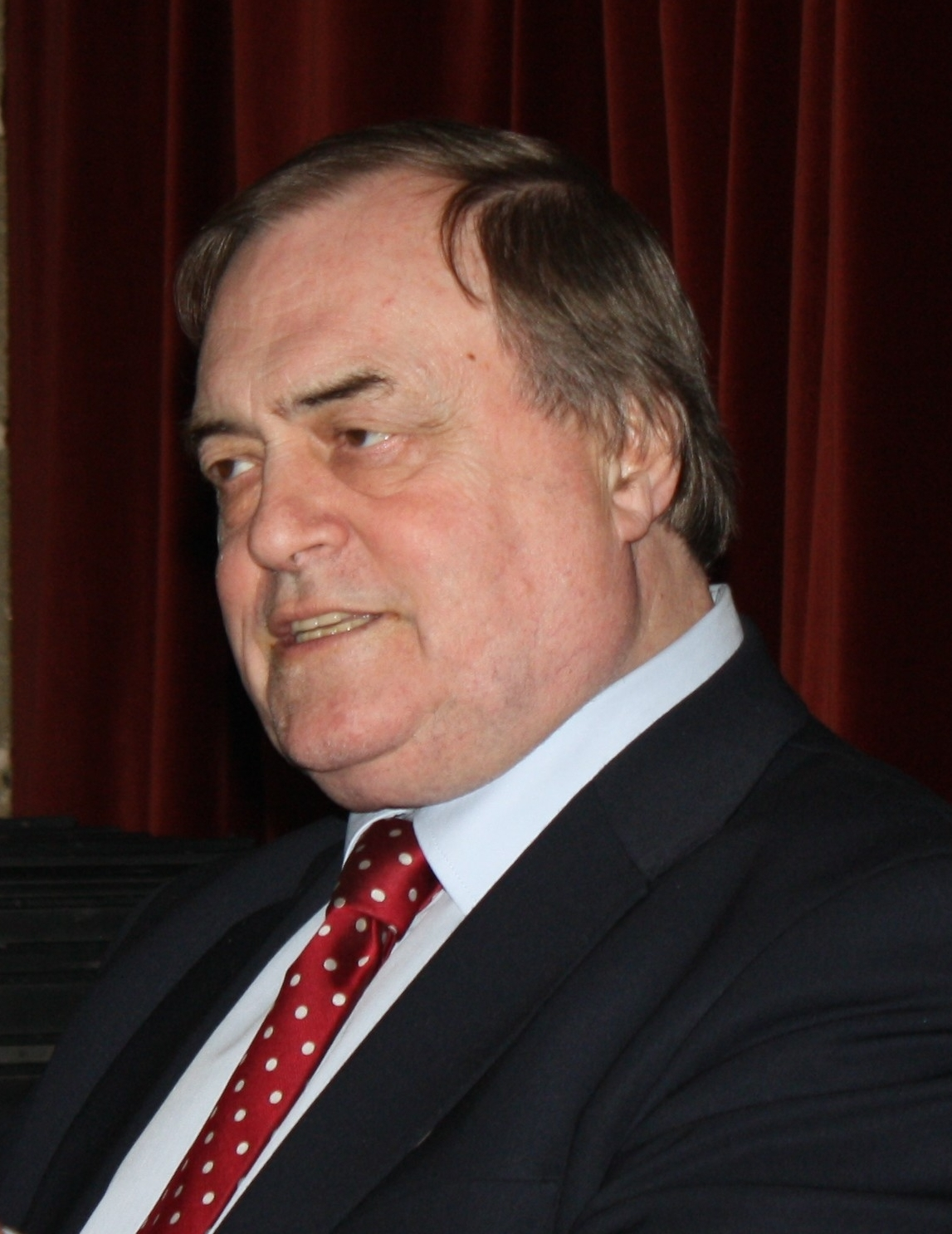
John Prescott, 2009

- Gordon Macdonald, 1st Baron Macdonald of Gwaenysgor (1888–1966), politician and Newfoundland's final British governor
- Sir Huw Wheldon (1916–1986), a broadcaster and BBC executive.
- Harold Bird-Wilson (1919–2000), senior Royal Air Force officer, and a flying ace in WWII.
- Emyr Humphreys (1919–2020), a Welsh novelist, poet and author.
- Peggy Cummins (1925–2017), an Irish actress
- John Prescott (1938–2024), politician, UK Deputy Prime Minister, 1997 to 2007
- Neil Aspinall (1941–2008), music industry executive, head of the Beatles' co. Apple Corps.
- Gareth Williams, Baron Williams of Mostyn (1941–2003), barrister and politician
- Barry Flanagan (1941–2009), sculptor of bronze statues of hares
- Jonathan Elphick (born 1945), natural history author, ornithologist and zoologist
- Philip Caveney (born 1951), a British children's author
- Karl Wallinger (1957–2024), pop musician, songwriter and record producer.
- Bryn Crossley (1958–2018), champion flat racing jockey
- Mike Peters (1959–2025), pop musician, lead singer of The Alarm
- Carol Vorderman (born 1960), media personality, brought up in Prestatyn, co-hosted the game show Countdown for 26 years from 1982 until 2008
- Danny Coyne (born 1973), former goalkeeper with 442 club caps and 16 for Wales

== Annual events ==
=== Flower Show ===
Prestatyn Flower Show is an annual event held in Prestatyn town centre on the last Friday and Saturday of July. It has traditionally been held within the grounds of Cerrig Llwydion, High Street, Prestatyn, which was formerly a vicarage. The event also includes a small display of classic cars and vintage motorcycles on Saturday.

=== Carnival ===
Prestatyn Carnival is an annual summer event in the town, and features field events, competitions and a procession. The traditional Carnival Parade takes place on the Saturday, and is followed by a Carnival Baby Competition later in the day. In 2008 the carnival became a two-day event, with the Sunday designated "Fun on the Field" day, with many events including a talent show and dance competition. In 2011 the event reverted to its original one–day format.

In 2008, Prestatyn Carnival Association revived the 'Miss Prestatyn' title.

=== Classic Car Show ===
The largest free classic car show in North Wales with over 400 vehicles taking part in 2019. The show is an annual event taking place on the last Bank Holiday Monday in May since 2000. It usually takes place on Ty Nant car park in Prestatyn town centre, but expanded in 2019 to include the majority of the High Street. In 2020, due to the COVID-19 pandemic, there was a virtual show.

== Cultural references ==
Philip Larkin wrote a poem entitled 'Sunny Prestatyn'. In it he describes a poster advertising the resort that is progressively defaced by vulgar graffiti. Roddy Frame and Jeremy Stacey wrote most of Aztec Camera's 1995 album Frestonia during a three-week retreat at the Sands Hotel in Prestatyn. Frame later blamed the overcast and grim weather conditions there for the album's melancholy and gloomy tone.

The town also appears in The Royle Family 2009 Christmas special "The Golden Egg Cup", in which the family visits Prestatyn to celebrate Jim and Barb's fiftieth wedding anniversary.

== Sport ==
The town is host to two major football teams within the Welsh football league pyramid, Prestatyn Town and the recently formed Prestatyn Sports.

Local football side Prestatyn Town gained promotion to the Welsh Premier League having been crowned champions of the Cymru Alliance League 2007-08 season. As of 23 April 2008, planning permission for floodlights and seating had been granted in order to meet the Welsh Premier grading requirements. The deadline for these upgrades was 1 May 2008 and, having passed these requirements, their promotion was ratified by the Welsh Premier League on 15 May. They currently play in the Cymru North, the second tier of Welsh football.

Many qualification rounds in snooker were once held at Pontin's Holiday Camp here; this included all the major snooker tournaments, and the World Championship. The qualification rounds have since moved to the World Snooker Academy in Sheffield.

Founded in 1895, Prestatyn Cricket Club has recently celebrated its 125th anniversary. As of 1 November 2020 they play in Liverpool and District Comp (LDDC) 1st XI division.
