= Dyserth =

Village in Denbighshire, Wales

Dyserth: Welsh: Diserth
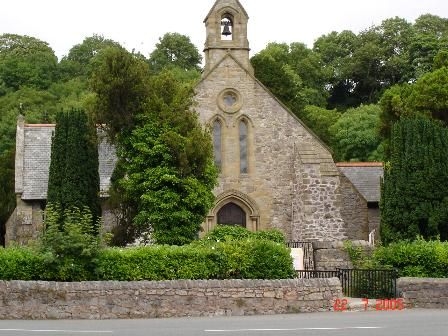
- Church of St Brigid

- Location within Denbighshire
- Population: 2,269 (2011)
- OS grid reference: SJ056789
- Community: Dyserth
- Principal area: Denbighshire
- Country: Wales
- Sovereign state: United Kingdom
- Post town: RHYL
- Postcode district: LL18
- Dialling code: 01745
- Police: North Wales
- Fire: North Wales
- Ambulance: Welsh
- UK Parliament: Clwyd East
- Senedd Cymru – Welsh Parliament: Vale of Clwyd
- List of places UK Wales Denbighshire 53.299°N 3.416°W Map of the community

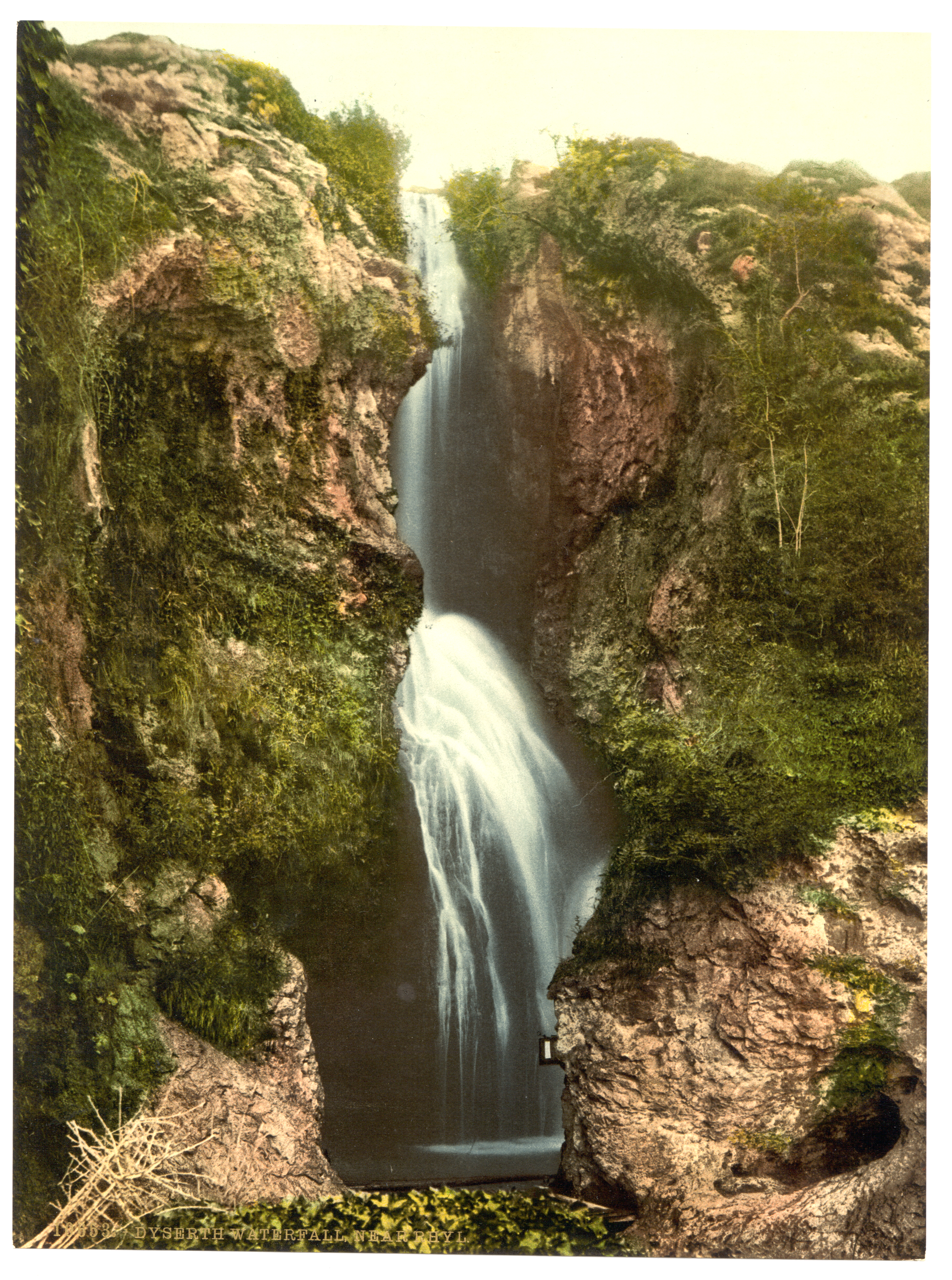
Dyserth Waterfall in the late 19th century

Dyserth (Welsh: Diserth) is a village, community and electoral ward in Denbighshire, Wales. Its population at the 2011 United Kingdom census was 2,269 and was estimated by the Office for National Statistics as 2,271 in 2019. It lies within the historic county boundaries of Flintshire. Features include quarrying remains, waterfalls and the mountain Moel Hiraddug. Its railway line, once part of the London and North Western Railway, finally closed in 1973 and is now a footpath.

The village lies on the A5151 road, which links Rhuddlan and Holywell. The nearest major settlements are the coastal towns of Rhyl and Prestatyn.

== Overview ==
Dyserth is mentioned in the Domesday Book of 1086, listed in the Hundred of Ati's Cross and within Cheshire:

Ad hoc manerium ROELENT jacent hae berewiches, DISSAREN BODUGAN CHILVEN et MAENEVAL. In his est terra i carrucata tantum et silva i leuva longa et dimidia lata. Ibi est francigena et ii villani habent i caracutas.

Translation:

To this manor of Rhuddlan belong these berewicks, DYSERTH BODEGAN (1.5 m ENE of St Asaph) CHILVAN (?) and MAENEFA (?). In these the land is 1 carucate only, and there is a wood 1 league long and a half wide. One foreign woman and 2 villeins have 1 carucate there.

In the Middle Ages, Dyserth was the centre of the commote of Prestatyn, in the cantref of Tegeingl. Here, 1 km west of the present village, was Bodrhyddan Hall, occupied by the Conwy family, one of the most powerful noble families of North Wales. According to the antiquary Edward Lhuyd, the poet, scholar and priest Dafydd Ddu o Hiraddug (died around 1370) was buried in Dyserth church.

Dyserth is the location of Dyserth Castle, which was established by Henry III after the defeat of Dafydd ap Llywelyn in 1241. In 1263 Llywelyn ap Gruffudd destroyed the castle after a six-week siege. The remains of the castle were quarried away during World War I.

The oldest industry in the village and surrounding area is mining, with lead, copper and limestone just some of the minerals being extracted locally in the past. These quarries are still visible and form a major part of the village's geography, though mining ceased when Dyserth Quarry closed in 1981.

Traditionally there has been a strong Welsh language speaking community in the village; and until recent times many families and village folk knew, or knew of, each other. This is typical of a rural community whose life often centred on its many churches and chapels. Many of the village's families have their roots in agriculture, with many notable farms in or around Dyserth, including Hottia, Bryn Cnewyllyn and Ty Newydd.

== Places of worship ==
The parish church of St Bridget and St Cwyfan, of the Church in Wales (the Wales-based churches of the Anglican Communion), is a Grade II* listed building. The church is dedicated to St Brigid of Kildare, and includes the name of the Celtic monk St Cwyfan, believed to have founded the original place of worship near the Dyserth Waterfall during the 6th century. The church is notable for a Jesse Window dating from the 16th century.

The graveyard of the church is home to two of only ten surviving "hooded" tombs, a design so called for the decorative arch atop the main body of the tomb and known only from seventeenth-century North Wales.

Dyserth Chapel, in Dyserth High Street, built in 1927, also has stained glass. It houses the English-speaking Horeb United Reformed Church.

== Railway ==
The Dyserth branch line was opened by the London and North Western Railway in 1869 to tap limestone quarries and a lead mine. A passenger, parcels and goods service was introduced in 1905 to serve local needs and an expanding holiday industry. The company designed and built a single-carriage, steam-powered motor train for such lines, with the Dyserth branch using the first example. The passenger service was a success before the First World War. Services were doubled and an additional unit provided for the motor trains. After the war the motor trains were replaced by locomotive-propelled push-pull trains. Road competition and the 1926 General Strike ate into profits, leading the London, Midland and Scottish Railway to withdraw the passenger service in 1930.

The line remained open for minerals, parcels and general goods until the end of November 1951, when parcels and general goods traffic ended, leaving just coal to Dyserth and limestone products from a quarry in that village. Coal traffic ended in May 1964, with lime and limestone traffic continuing until the line officially closed completely on 7 September 1973, although at least two special trains took stone away in 1974.

The tracks were lifted in 1980, with the former trackbed now converted into a mixed-use footpath and bridleway.

== People of note ==
- Layton Maxwell (b. 1979), footballer
- Mike Peters (1959–2025), musician and songwriter
- John Roberts (1853–1949), missionary

== Bibliography ==
- Goodall, Stephen P. (2003). The Prestatyn and Dyserth Branch Line. Headington: Oakwood Press. ISBN 978-0-85361-313-8. LP 160.
- Mitchell, Vic; Smith, Keith (2011). Chester to Rhyl, including the Holywell Town and Dyserth Branches. Midland Main Lines. Midhurst: Middleton Press (MD). ISBN 978-1-906008-93-2.
- Prestwich, Michael (2010). "Edward I and Wales". In Williams, Diane M.; Kenyon, John R. (eds.). The Impact of the Edwardian Castles in Wales. Oxbow Books. pp. 1–8. ISBN 978-1-84217-380-0. JSTOR j.ctt1cd0nkc.6.
- Rear, W. G. (2003). From Chester to Holyhead : The Branch Lines. Shepperton: Ian Allan Publishing. ISBN 978-0-86093-569-8.
