= List of churches in Denbighshire =

The following is a list of churches in Denbighshire, Wales.

== Active churches ==
Name	Community (settlement)	Dedication	Web	Founded	Denomination	Benefice	Notes
Capel y Gro, Betws Gwerfyl Goch	Betws Gwerfil Goch				Presbyterian		
Capel Cynfal, Melin y Wig	Betws Gwerfil Goch (Melin y Wig)				Presbyterian		
St Margaret, Bodelwyddan	Bodelwyddan	Margaret the Virgin		1856-1860	Church in Wales	Aber-Morfa Mission Area	Nicknamed the 'Marble Church'
St Stephen, Bodfari	Bodfari	Stephen		Medieval?	Church in Wales	Denbigh Mission Area	Rebuilt 1865
Capel y Waen, Bodfari	Bodfari				Presbyterian	Bro Dinbych	
St Tysilio, Bryneglwys	Bryneglwys	Tysilio		Medieval	Church in Wales	Llandegla & Bryneglwys	
St Mary, Cefn Meiriadog	Cefn Meiriadog	Mary		1864	Church in Wales	Denbigh Mission Area	May be a rebuilding of an earlier church
Capel Cefn Meiriadog	Cefn Meiriadog				Presbyterian	Bro Aled	
All Saints, Sinan	Cefn Meiriadog (Sinan)	All Saints			Church in Wales	Denbigh Mission Area	
St Foddhyd, Clocaenog	Clocaenog	Foddhyd		Medieval	Church in Wales	Dyffryn Clwyd Mission Area	
SS Mael & Sulien, Corwen	Corwen	Maël & Sulien		Medieval	Church in Wales	Corwen etc.	
Capel Rehoboth, Corwen	Corwen	Rehoboth			Methodist	Cymru	
Seion a Bryneglwys United Church, Corwen	Corwen	Zion			Presbyterian		
St Ffraid, Carrog	Corwen (Carrog)	Brigid of Kildare		Medieval	Church in Wales	Corwen etc.	
Capel Carrog	Corwen (Carrog)				Baptist Union		
Capel Seion, Carrog	Corwen (Carrog)	Zion			Presbyterian		
St Thomas, Glyndyfrdwy	Corwen (Glyndyfrdwy)	Thomas		1857-1859	Church in Wales	Corwen etc.	
Capel Seion, Glyndyfrdwy	Corwen (Glyndyfrdwy)	Zion			Methodist	Cymru	
SS Mael & Sulien, Cwm	Cwm	Maël & Sulien		Medieval	Church in Wales	Dyserth, Trelawnyd, Cwm	
St Mary, Cyffylliog	Cyffylliog	Mary		Medieval	Church in Wales	Dyffryn Clwyd Mission Area	
Capel Salem, Cyffylliog	Cyffylliog	Jerusalem			Presbyterian		
Capel Bontuchel	Cyffylliog (Bontuchel)				Presbyterian		
St John the Evangelist, Cynwyd	Cynwyd	John the Evangelist		1856	Church in Wales	Corwen etc.	Original parish church was at Llangar (see below)
Capel Bethel, Cynwyd	Cynwyd	Bethel			Presbyterian		
St Mary the Virgin, Denbigh	Denbigh	Mary		1871-1874	Church in Wales	Denbigh Mission Area	
St Joseph, Denbigh	Denbigh	Joseph		1969	Roman Catholic	Denbigh & Ruthin	Congregation probably older
Capel Pendref, Denbigh	Denbigh				Methodist	Cymru	
Capel Mawr a Seion, Denbigh	Denbigh	Zion			Presbyterian	Bro Dinbych	
Capel y Fron, Denbigh	Denbigh				Presbyterian	Bro Dinbych	
St Thomas Presbyterian Church, Denbigh	Denbigh	Thomas		1875	Presbyterian		Building 1878-1880
Grace Church Denbigh	Denbigh				FIEC		Meets in Eirianfa Community Centre
Capel y Brwcws	Denbigh (Brookhouse)				Presbyterian	Bro Dinbych	
Capel Saron, Gwaenynog	Denbigh (Gwaenynog)	Sharon Plain			Methodist	Cymru	
St Marcella, Llanfarchell	Denbigh (Llanfarchell)	Marcella		Medieval	Church in Wales	Denbigh Mission Area	Original parish church of Denbigh
Capel Derwen	Derwen				Presbyterian		
Capel Clawdd Newydd	Derwen (Clawddnewydd)				Presbyterian		
SS Bridget & Cwyfan, Lower Dyserth	Dyserth	Brigid of Kildare & Cwyfan		Medieval	Church in Wales	Dyserth, Trelawnyd, Cwm	
Capel Bethel, Dyserth	Dyserth	Bethel			Presbyterian	Gofalaeth Prestatyn	
Horeb United Reformed Church, Dyserth	Dyserth	Mount Horeb		1906	URC		Building previously UWI. Belonged to NWECU.
St Michael, Efenechtyd	Efenechtyd	Michael		Medieval	Church in Wales	Dyffryn Clwyd Mission Area	
Y Rhiw United Church, Pwllglas	Efenechtyd (Pwllglas)				Presbyterian		
St Beuno, Gwyddelwern	Gwyddelwern	Beuno		Medieval	Church in Wales	Corwen etc.	
Capel Wesley, Gwyddelwern	Gwyddelwern	John Wesley			Methodist	Cymru	
Capel Moreia, Gwyddelwern	Gwyddelwern	Moriah			Presbyterian		
St Sadwrn, Henllan	Henllan	Sadwrn		Medieval	Church in Wales	Denbigh Mission Area	Rebuilt 1806
Capel Henllan	Henllan				Presbyterian	Bro Aled	
St Garmon, Llanarmon-yn-Iâl	Llanarmon-yn-Iâl	Germanus of Auxerre		Medieval	Church in Wales	Dyffryn Clwyd Mission Area	
Capel Bethel, Llanarmon-yn-Iâl	Llanarmon-yn-Iâl	Bethel			Presbyterian		
St Peter, Llanbedr Dyffryn Clwyd	Llanbedr-Dyffryn-Clwyd	Peter		Medieval	Church in Wales	Dyffryn Clwyd Mission Area	New building 1862 (old church stands in ruins)
St Meugan, Llanrhydd	Llanbedr-Dyffryn-Clwyd (Llanrhydd)	Mawgan		Medieval	Church in Wales	Dyffryn Clwyd Mission Area	
St Tecla, Llandegla	Llandegla	Thecla ??		pre-C19th	Church in Wales	Llandegla & Bryneglwys	Rebuilt 1866
Capel Bethania, Llandegla	Llandegla	Bethany			Presbyterian		Combined with Independents in Capel Piscah
St Trillo, Llandrillo-yn-Edeyrn	Llandrillo	Trillo		Medieval	Church in Wales	Llandrillo-yn-Edeirnion & Llandderfel	
Capel Hermon, Llandrillo	Llandrillo	Mount Hermon			Presbyterian		
St Tyrnog, Llandyrnog	Llandyrnog	Tyrnog		Medieval	Church in Wales	Denbigh Mission Area	
Capel y Dyffryn, Llandyrnog	Llandyrnog				Presbyterian	Bro Dinbych	
St Cwyfan, Llangwyfan	Llandyrnog (Llangwyfan)	Cwyfan			Church in Wales	Denbigh Mission Area	
St Elidan, Llanelidan	Llanelidan	Elidan		Medieval	Church in Wales	Dyffryn Clwyd Mission Area	
SS Cynfarch & Mary, Llanfair Dyffryn Clwyd	Llanfair Dyffryn Clwyd	Cynfarch & Mary		Medieval	Church in Wales	Dyffryn Clwyd Mission Area	
Capel Salem, Llanfair Dyffryn Clwyd	Llanfair Dyffryn Clwyd	Jerusalem			Presbyterian		
Capel Bethel, Pentrecelyn	Llanfair Dyffryn Clwyd (Pentrecelyn)	Bethel			Presbyterian		
St Berres, Llanferres	Llanferres	Berres		Medieval	Church in Wales	Mold Mission Area	
St Collen’s Church	Llangollen	Collen		Medieval	Church in Wales	Llangollen, Trevor, Llantysilio	
St John, Llangollen	Llangollen	John ?		1858	Church in Wales	Llangollen, Trevor, Llantysilio	Services in Welsh
Holy Cross, Llangollen	Llangollen	Cross		1940s	Roman Catholic	Parish of St Richard Gwyn	First building 1947, new building 1958-1961
Llangollen Methodist Church	Llangollen				Methodist	Wrexham Circuit	
Capel Seion, Llangollen	Llangollen	Zion			Methodist	Cymru	
Glanrafon Evangelical Church, Llangollen	Llangollen			1981	AECW		
St Cynhafal, Llangynhafal	Llangynhafal	Cynhafal		Medieval	Church in Wales	Dyffryn Clwyd Mission Area	
Capel Gellifor	Llangynhafal (Gellifor)				Presbyterian	Bro Dinbych	
St Hychan, Llanychan	Llangynhafal (Llanychan)	Hychan		Medieval	Church in Wales	Dyffryn Clwyd Mission Area	
St Dyfnog, Llanrhaeadr-yng-Nghinmeirch	Llanrhaeadr-yng-Nghinmeirch	Dyfnog		Medieval	Church in Wales	Denbigh Mission Area	
Capel y Glyn, Llanrhaeadr	Llanrhaeadr-yng-Nghinmeirch				Presbyterian	Bro Dinbych	
Capel Pentre, Llanrhaeadr	Llanrhaeadr-yng-Nghinmeirch				Presbyterian	Bro Dinbych	
Capel Peniel	Llanrhaeadr-yng-Nghinmeirch (Peniel)	Penuel			Presbyterian	Bro Aled	
Capel Prion	Llanrhaeadr-yng-Nghinmeirch (Prion)				Presbyterian	Bro Dinbych	
Capel Saron	Llanrhaeadr-yng-Nghinmeirch (Saron)	Sharon Plain			Presbyterian	Bro Aled	
St Tysilio, Llantysilio	Llantysilio	Tysilio		Medieval	Church in Wales	Llangollen, Trevor, Llantysilio	
Capel Hebron, Rhewl	Llantysilio (Rhewl)	Hebron			Methodist	Cymru	
Capel Rhewl	Llantysilio (Rhewl)				Presbyterian		
St Saeran, Llanynys	Llanynys	Saeran		Medieval	Church in Wales	Dyffryn Clwyd Mission Area	
St James, Nantglyn	Nantglyn	James		pre-C18th	Church in Wales	Denbigh Mission Area	
Capel Nantglyn	Nantglyn				Presbyterian	Bro Aled	
Christ Church, Prestatyn	Prestatyn	Jesus		1863	Church in Wales	Prestatyn Benefice	
Holy Spirit, Prestatyn	Prestatyn	Holy Spirit		1940s	Church in Wales	Prestatyn Benefice	Until 1966 army camp chapel then mission church
SS Peter & Frances, Prestatyn	Prestatyn	Peter & Frances of Rome		1903	Roman Catholic	Prestatyn Catholic Parish	
Capel Salem, Prestatyn	Prestatyn	Jerusalem			Baptist Union		
Trinity Methodist Church, Prestatyn	Prestatyn	Trinity			Methodist	Conwy & Prestatyn Circuit	
Capel Bethel, Prestatyn	Prestatyn	Bethel			Methodist	Cymru	
St John's Methodist Church, Prestatyn	Prestatyn	John ?			Methodist		Not on Methodist website; possibly defunct
Capel Rehoboth, Prestatyn	Prestatyn	Rehoboth			Presbyterian	Gofalaeth Prestatyn	
Nant Hall Road Presbyterian Church	Prestatyn			1902	Presbyterian		Planted from Capel Rehoboth
Alive Church Prestatyn	Prestatyn				Assemblies of God		Was Calvary Church Prestatyn (or two churches?)
Beacon Baptist Church, Prestatyn	Prestatyn				Independent		
Deva Evangelical Church, Prestatyn	Prestatyn			1964	Independent		Originally a Brethren church
St Melyd, Meliden	Prestatyn (Meliden)	Melyd			Church in Wales	Meliden & Gwaenysgor	
St Mary, Rhuddlan	Rhuddlan	Mary		Medieval	Church in Wales	Aber-Morfa Mission Area	
St Illtyd, Rhuddlan	Rhuddlan	Illtud			Roman Catholic	St Asaph Catholic Parish	
Rhuddlan Methodist Church	Rhuddlan				Methodist	Conwy & Prestatyn Circuit	
Capel Ebeneser, Rhuddlan	Rhuddlan	Eben-Ezer			Presbyterian	Gofalaeth Prestatyn	
Gosen Church Rhuddlan	Rhuddlan	Land of Goshen		1985	AECW		
Holy Trinity, Rhyl	Rhyl	Trinity		1835	Church in Wales	Aber-Morfa Mission Area	Chapel of ease to Rhuddlan until 1844
St Thomas, Rhyl	Rhyl	Thomas		1861-1867	Church in Wales	Aber-Morfa Mission Area	English services when Holy Trinity was in Welsh
St Ann, Rhyl	Rhyl	Anne		pre-1912	Church in Wales	Aber-Morfa Mission Area	
Our Lady of the Assumption, Rhyl	Rhyl	Mary		1851	Roman Catholic	Rhyl	Rebuilt 1873. First Jesuit church in Wales
Sussex Street Christian Centre, Rhyl	Rhyl				Baptist Union GB		
Capel Clwyd Street, Rhyl	Rhyl				Presbyterian	Gofalaeth Prestatyn	
Rhyl United Church	Rhyl			c. 1820	URC / PCW		
Rhyl Salvation Army	Rhyl				Salvation Army		
Oasis Christian Centre, Rhyl	Rhyl				Apostolic Church		
Rhyl Seventh-Day Adventist Church	Rhyl				7th-Day Adventist		
Good News Family Church	Rhyl				Independent		
Minster of St Peter, Ruthin	Ruthin	Peter		Medieval	Church in Wales	Dyffryn Clwyd Mission Area	
Ruthin Christian Fellowship	Ruthin			2003	Baptist Union		Joined Baptist Union 2011
Capel Rhuthun, Ruthin	Ruthin				Baptist Union		=above?
Capel Bathafarn, Ruthin	Ruthin	Bathafarn (?)			Methodist	Cymru	
Capel Tabernacl, Ruthin	Ruthin	Tabernacle			Presbyterian		
Capel Bethania, Ruthin	Ruthin	Bethany			Presbyterian	Gofalaeth Morris P. Morris	
Ruthin Presbyterian Church	Ruthin				Presbyterian		
SS Mwrog & Mary, Llanfwrog	Ruthin (Llanfwrog)	Mwrog & Mary		Medieval	Church in Wales	Dyffryn Clwyd Mission Area	
Our Lady Help of Christians, Ruthin	Ruthin (Llanfwrog)	Mary			Roman Catholic	Denbigh & Ruthin	May share a building with St Mwrog's
St Asaph Cathedral	St Asaph	Asaph & Mungo		Ancient	Church in Wales	St Asaph	
SS Asaph & Cyndeyrn, St Asaph	St Asaph	Asaph & Mungo		Medieval	Church in Wales	St Asaph	
St Winefride, St Asaph	St Asaph	Winifred			Roman Catholic	St Asaph Catholic Parish	
St Asaph Baptist Church	St Asaph			2001	Baptist Union GB		Plant from Sussex Street, Rhyl
Capel Peniel, St Asaph	St Asaph	Penuel			Methodist	Cymru	
Bethlehem United Church, Llanelwy	St Asaph	Bethlehem			Presbyterian	Gofalaeth Prestatyn	
Holy Trinity, Trefnant	Trefnant	Trinity		1853-1855	Church in Wales	Denbigh Mission Area	
Capel Trefnant	Trefnant				Presbyterian	Bro Dinbych	
Corpus Christi, Tremeirchion	Tremeirchion	Body of Christ		Medieval	Church in Wales	Denbigh Mission Area	
Our Lady of Sorrows (Rock) Chapel	Tremeirchion	Mary		1866	Roman Catholic		Part of St Beuno's Ignatian Spirituality Centre

== Defunct churches ==
Name	Community (settlement)	Dedication	Web	Founded	Redundant	Denomination	Notes
St Mary, Betws Gwerful Goch	Betws Gwerfil Goch	Mary		Medieval		Church in Wales	No evidence of closure but not listed on CiW site
All Saints, Llangar	Cynwyd (Llangar)	All Saints		Medieval	1856	Church in Wales	In care of Cadw, significant C20th conservation works
Leicester's Church, Denbigh	Denbigh	David of Wales		1578-1584			Never finished. Only significant Elizabethan church in Britain
St Hilary, Denbigh	Denbigh	Hilary ?		Medieval	1874	Church in Wales	Demolished apart from tower 1923
St David, Denbigh	Denbigh	David of Wales		1838-1840	C20th	Church in Wales	Rebuilt 1895. Now owned by Howell's School and used as school chapel
St Mary, Derwen	Derwen	Mary		Medieval	1999	Church in Wales	Friends of Friendless Churches 2001
St David, Eryrys	Llanarmon-yn-Iâl (Eryrys)	David of Wales		1862-1863	1980s	Church in Wales	Now a community centre
St James, Prion	Llanrhaeadr-yng-Nghinmeirch (Prion)	James		1859	2008	Church in Wales	Now a house
St Mary Mission Church, Eglwyseg	Llantysilio (Eglwyseg)	Mary		1870-1871	1985	Church in Wales	Now a house
Rhewl Church	Llanynys (Rhewl)	?				Church in Wales	
St John, Rhyl	Rhyl	John ?		1885	1997	Church in Wales	Now called Churchill House
