= Diocese of St Asaph =

Diocese of the Church in Wales

Coordinates: 53.2572°N 3.4419°W

Diocese of Saint Asaph Esgobaeth Llanelwy
- Coat of arms

- Flag

Location
- Ecclesiastical province: Wales
- Archdeaconries: St Asaph, Montgomery, Wrexham

Information
- Cathedral: St Asaph Cathedral

Current leadership
- Bishop: Gregory Cameron
- Dean: Nigel Williams

Map
- Map of the diocese in the Church in Wales

Website
- www.dioceseofstasaph.org.uk

The Diocese of Saint Asaph is a diocese of the Church in Wales in north-east Wales, named after Saint Asaph, its second bishop.

== Geography ==
The Anglican Diocese of St Asaph in the north-east corner of Wales stretches from the borders of Chester in the east, to the Conwy valley in the west, to Bala in the south-west, and Newtown in the south-east. The population is in excess of half a million people, with five thousand regularly attending services.

The more populous areas are to be found along the coast and in the large conurbation of Wrexham, the principal town. The industrial areas around Wrexham and Deeside have undergone great change in the past decade or so. Where once the coal, steel and textile industries provided most of the employment, the economy is now much more diversified and one of the fastest growing in the UK. A major employer is Airbus UK (currently part of BAE Systems), while Wrexham Industrial Estate is one of the largest in Europe. North-east Wales also acts as a dormitory area for Chester Business Park, which is dominated by MBNA. This economy is ministered to by an Industrial Chaplain, a post which alternates between a Church in Wales priest and a Presbyterian Church of Wales minister.

Most of the diocese is rural, interspersed with small market towns and village communities. The southern area of the diocese in north Powys is undergoing regional development, especially with the advent of a good number of small industries. Because of the beauty of the landscape, at holiday times there is a large influx of visitors from England and further afield. Tourism is now one of the growth industries of this area of Wales.

Traditionally, the Diocese of St Asaph extended across the border into England. However, following disestablishment on 31 March 1920, the Shropshire parishes of Criftins, Hengoed, Kinnerley, Knockin, Llanyblodwel, Llanymynech, Melverley, Morton, Oswestry, St Martins, Selattyn, Trefonen, Weston Rhyn and Whittington were transferred from the Diocese of St Asaph to the English Diocese of Lichfield.

== History ==
This diocese was founded by St. Kentigern about the middle of the sixth century, when he was exiled from his see in Scotland. He founded a monastery called Llanelwy at the confluence of the rivers Clwyd and Elwy in north east Wales, where after his return to Scotland in 573 he was succeeded by Asaph or Asa, who was consecrated Bishop of Llanelwy.

The diocese originally coincided with the Welsh principality of Powys, but lost much territory first by the Mercian encroachment marked by Watt's dyke and again by the construction of Offa's dyke, soon after 798. Nothing is known of the history of the diocese during the disturbed period that followed. Domesday Book gives scanty particulars of a few churches but is silent as to the cathedral.

Early in the twelfth century, Norman influence asserted itself and in 1143 Theobald, Archbishop of Canterbury, consecrated one Gilbert as Bishop of St. Asaph, but the position of his successors was very difficult and one of them, Godfrey, was driven away by poverty and the hostility of the Welsh. A return made in the middle of the thirteenth century (British Library, Cotton MSS, Vitellius, c. x.) shows the existence of eight rural deaneries, seventy-nine churches, and nineteen chapels. By 1291 the deaneries had been doubled in number and there were Cistercian houses at Basingwerk, Aberconway, Strata Marcella and Valle Crucis, and a Cistercian nunnery, Llanllugan Abbey. The cathedral, which had been burnt in the wars, was rebuilt and completed in 1295. It was a plain massive structure of simple plan, and was again destroyed during the English succession Wars of the Roses. When it was restored by Bishop Redman the palace was not rebuilt and thus the bishops continued to be nonresident. At the end of the fifteenth century there was a great revival of church building, as is evidenced by the churches of that date still existing in the diocese.

The chief shrines in the diocese were St. Winefred's Well, St. Garmon in Yale (Welsh: Iâl), St. Dervel Gadarn in Edeirnion, St. Monacella at Pennant and the Holy Cross in Strata Marcella. All these were demolished at the Anglican Reformation. At that time the diocese contained one archdeaconry, sixteen deaneries and one hundred and twenty-one parishes. The bishop at this time had five episcopal residences, four of which were assumed by the Church of England bishop under Edward VI.

The Report of the Commissioners appointed by his Majesty to inquire into the Ecclesiastical Revenues of England and Wales (1835) found the see had an annual net income of £6,301. This made it the wealthiest diocese in Wales and the fourth richest in Britain after Canterbury, London and Winchester.

== Lists of archdeacons ==
=== Archdeacons of Montgomery ===
The archdeaconry was created from that of St Asaph on 6 February 1844.

=== Archdeacons of Wrexham ===
The archdeaconry was created from those of St Asaph and of Montgomery on 25 March 1890.
Some archdeacons of Wrexham are recorded with the title Archdeacon of Wrexham and Ruthin.

- 1890–1897 (res.): David Howell
- 1897–1910 (res.): Llewelyn Wynne Jones
- 1910–1925 (res.): William Fletcher
- 1925–1930 (d.): Lewis Pryce
- 1930–1947 (ret.): James Williams
- 1948–1957 (res.): Richard Mackenzie Williams
- 1957-1969 (res): Benjamin Jones-Perrott
- 1969–1978 (ret.): John Davies
- 1978–1987 (d.): Raymond Foster
- 1987–2001 (ret.): Bryan Williams
- 2001–2010 (res.): Malcolm Squires
- 2010–2013 (ret.): Shirley Griffiths
- 2014–2018: Bob Griffiths
- 7 October 2018 – 2021: John Lomas (became Bishop of Swansea and Brecon)
- 5 March 2023 – present: Hayley Matthews

Hayley Deborah Yeshua Matthews (born 1968) was collated Archdeacon of Wrexham on 5 March 2023. She trained for the ministry at Ridley Hall, Cambridge before receiving ordination in the Church of England: she was made deacon at Petertide 2007 (1 July) — by Nicholas Reade, Bishop of Blackburn, at Blackburn Cathedral — and ordained priest the following Petertide (28 June 2008) — by Geoff Pearson, Bishop of Lancaster, at Lancaster Priory (i.e. Matthews' title church). During her time in Lancaster she was Chair of Churches Together Lancaster, Chaplain to the Dukes Theatre, and Honorary Padre to the Duke of Lancaster's Regimental Association. She served her title (curacy) at Lancaster Priory before moving to Manchester: first as Pioneer Chaplain to MediaCityUK and Honorary Chaplain to Salford University and the BBC where she was a regular contributor to BBC Radio Manchester, then as Rector of Holy Innocents Fallowfield with Birch, Honorary Chaplain to Manchester University at St Peter's House and Padre to 6MI Manchester. From 2012 - 2018 Matthews served as Trustee to the William Temple Foundation, latterly as acting Chair publishing the Temple Tract Grace and Power: sexuality and gender in the CHurch of England in 2015. Matthews was Director of Lay Training for Leeds diocese, Principal of Leeds School of Ministry, and an honorary canon of Ripon Cathedral prior to her archidiaconal appointment.

== Archdeaconries and deaneries ==
Diocese	Archdeaconry	Deanery	Churches	Population	People/church
Diocese of St Asaph	Archdeaconry of Montgomery	Deanery of Cedewain	9	17,716	1,968
Diocese of St Asaph	Archdeaconry of Montgomery	Deanery of Mathrafal	21	12,707	605
Diocese of St Asaph	Archdeaconry of Montgomery	Deanery of Penedeyrn	6	7,786	1,298
Diocese of St Asaph	Archdeaconry of Montgomery	Deanery of Pool	15	16,010	1,067
Diocese of St Asaph	Archdeaconry of Montgomery	Deanery of Valle Crucis	11	11,078	1,007
Diocese of St Asaph	Archdeaconry of St Asaph	Deanery of Denbigh	14	18,794	1,342
Diocese of St Asaph	Archdeaconry of St Asaph	Deanery of Dyffryn Clwyd	12	11,894	991
Diocese of St Asaph	Archdeaconry of St Asaph	Deanery of Holywell	14	35,404	2,529
Diocese of St Asaph	Archdeaconry of St Asaph	Deanery of Llanrwst and Rhos	26	74,181	2,853
Diocese of St Asaph	Archdeaconry of St Asaph	Deanery of St Asaph	16	69,730	4,358
Diocese of St Asaph	Archdeaconry of Wrexham	Deanery of Alyn	12	44,250	3,688
Diocese of St Asaph	Archdeaconry of Wrexham	Deanery of Dee Valley	18	38,741	2,152
Diocese of St Asaph	Archdeaconry of Wrexham	Deanery of Hawarden	19	80,416	4,232
Diocese of St Asaph	Archdeaconry of Wrexham	Deanery of Mold	11	24,178	2,198
Diocese of St Asaph	Archdeaconry of Wrexham	Deanery of Wrexham	8	48,615	6,077
Total/average			212	511,500	2,413

In addition to the clergy 'on the ground', the diocese is served by one Potential Cleric, two Hope Street Senior Leaders, one Bishop's Chaplain, one Anglican Chaplain and three Honorary Assistant Bishops.

== List of churches ==
APC = ancient parish church; MC = medieval chapelry.

=== Archdeaconry of Montgomery ===
==== Caereinion Mission Area ====
This was formed by the union of the parishes of Garthbeibio, Llanerfyl, Llanfair Caereinion, Llangadfan, Llangynyw, Llanllugan, Manafon, Meifod, Pont Dolanog and Pont Robert. It is named after Llanfair Caereinion, the principal village. It has an estimated population of 4,857. As of September 2024 it was served by one Mission Area Leader (shared with Tanat-Vyrnwy), one Priest-in-Charge (shared with Tanat-Vyrnwy), one Pioneer Priest and one Assistant Curate.

Church	Founded (building)
St Mary, Llanfair Caereinion	APC (1868)
St Mary, Llanllugan	APC
St Cynyw, Llangynyw	APC
St Cadfan, Llangadfan	APC
St Erfyl, Llanerfyl	APC (1870)
St Tydecho, Garthbeibio	APC (1862)
St Michael & All Angels, Manafon	APC
SS Tysilio & Mary, Meifod^{1}	APC
St John the Evangelist, Dolanog	1853
St John the Evangelist, Pontrobert	1853
Former churches: none

^{1}Original dedication to St Tysilio

==== Cedewain Mission Area ====
This was formed by the union of the parishes of Aberhafesp, Betws Cedewain, Dolfor, Kerry, Llanllwchaiarn All Saints, Llanllwchaiarn St Llwchaiarn, Llanmerewig, Llanwyddelan, Mochdre and Tregynon. It is named after the medieval cantref of Cedewain. It has an estimated population of 16,433. As of September 2024 it was served by one Priest-in-Charge.

Church	Founded (building)	
St Gwynog, Aberhafesp	APC	
St Michael & All Angels, Kerry	APC	
All Saints, Newtown	1890	
All Saints, Mochdre	APC (1867)	
St Cynon, Tregynon	APC	
St Gwyddelan, Llanwyddelan	APC (1865)	
St Llwchaiarn, Llanllwchaiarn	APC (1816)	
St Beuno, Bettws Cedewain	APC	
St Llwchaiarn, Llanmerewig	APC (1845)	
Former churches	Founded (build)	Closed
St Paul, Dolfor	C19th	2020
St Mary, Newtown	APC	1856
St David, Newtown	1843	2006

==== Pool Mission Area ====
This was formed by the union of the parishes of Berriew, Buttington, Castle Caereinion, Criggion, Forden, Fron, Guilsfield, Llandrinio, Llandysilio St Mary, Llandysilio St Tysilio, Llandyssil, Montgomery, Pantyffridd, Penrhos, Pool Quay and Welshpool. It is named after Welshpool, the principal town. It has an estimated population of 17,113. As of September 2024 it was served by one Mission Area Leader, two Priests in Charge and one Associate Priest.

Church	Founded (building)	
St Aelhaiarn, Guilsfield	APC	
All Saints, Buttington	APC	
St John the Evangelist, Pool Quay	1862	
St Mary, Welshpool	APC	
St Beuno, Berriew	APC	
St Garmon, Castle Caereinion	APC (1865)	
Pantyffridd Mission Church	1858	
St Tysilio, Llandysilio	APC (1867)	
SS Trinio, Peter & Paul, Llandrinio^{1}	APC	
St Michael & All Angels, Criggion	MC (c. 1770)	
Holy Trinity, Penrhos	1625 (1845)	
St Michael & All Angels, Forden	APC (1867)	
St Nicholas, Montgomery	APC	
St Tysul, Llandyssil	APC (1866)	
St John's Mission Church, Garthmyl	C19th	
Former churches	Founded (build)	Closed
Christ Church, Welshpool	1839	1998
Trewern Mission Church	C19th	
Belan Mission Church	1840	2020

^{1}original dedication to St Trinio

==== Tanat-Vyrnwy Mission Area ====
This was formed by the union of the parishes of Brithdir, Bwlchycibau, Llanarmon Mynydd, Llanfechain, Llangadwaladr, Llangedwyn, Llangynog, Llanrhaeadr-Ym-Mochnant, Llansantffraid-Ym-Mechain, Llansilin, Llanwddyn, Llwydiarth, Pennant Melangell and Penybontfawr. It is named after the River Tanat and River Vyrnwy. It has an estimated population of 7,301. As of September 2024 it was served by one Mission Area Leader (shared with Caereinion), two Priests-in-Charge (one shared with Caereinion), and a House for Duty Priest.

Church	Founded (building)	
St Cedwyn, Llangedwyn	MC	
St Melangell, Pennant Melangell	APC	
St Dogfan, Llanrhaeadr-ym-Mochnant	APC	
St Silin, Llansilin	APC	
St Thomas, Penybontfawr	1855	
St Garmon, Llanfechain	APC	
St Mary, Llwydiarth	1854	
St Myllin, Llanfyllin	APC (1710)	
St Bridget, Llansantffraid-ym-Mechan	APC	
St Wyddyn, Llanwddyn	1887	
Christ Church, Bwlchycibau	1864	
Former churches	Founded (build)	Closed
St Cynog, Llangynog	APC (1792)	c. 2018
St Mary, Brithdir	1892	c. 2018
Rhiwlas Mission Church		c. 2018
St Garmon, Llanarmon Mynydd Mawr	MC	
St Illog, Hirnant	APC (1886)	
St John the Baptist, Llanwddyn^{1}	MC	1880s
St Cadwaladr, Llangadwaladr	MC	2020
St Michael, Llanfihangel-yng-Ngwynfa	APC (1864)	2020

^{1}original dedication to St Wyddyn

==== Valle Crucis Mission Area ====
This was formed in 2022 by the merger of the existing mission areas of Valle Crucis and Penedeyrn. The original Valle Crucis was formed in 2017 by the union of the parishes of Bryneglwys, Corwen St Ffraid, Corwen SS Mael & Sulien, Glyndyfrdwy, Gwyddelwern, Llanarmon Dyffryn Ceiriog, Llandegla, Llangollen St Collen, Llangollen St John, Llansantffraid Glyn Ceiriog, Llansantffraid Glyn Dyfrdwy, Llantysilio, Pontfadog and Trevor, and was named after Valle Crucis Abbey. Penedeyrn was formed by the union of the parishes of Bala, Cerrigydrudion, Dinmael, Frongoch, Llandderfel, Llandrillo, Llanfihangel Glyn Myfyr, Llangar, Llangwm, Llawrybetws and Ysbyty Ifan, and was named after part of the historical area of Edeirnion. The combined Mission Area has an estimated population of 19,695. As of September 2024 it was served by two Priests in Charge and a House for Duty Priest.

Church	Founded (building)	
Christ Church, Bala	1811 (1857)	
St Mary Magdalene, Cerrigydrudion	APC	
St Trillo, Llandrillo-yn-Edeyrn	APC (1776)	
St John the Evangelist, Cynwyd	1856	
St Collen, Llangollen	APC	
St Tysilio, Llantysilio	APC	
Trevor Parish Church	1772	
SS Mael & Sulien, Corwen	APC	
St Bridget, Llansantffraid Glyn Dyfrdwy	APC (1611)	
St Thomas, Glyndyfrdwy	1859	
St Tysilio, Bryneglwys	APC	
St Tecla, Llandegla	APC (1866)	
St Garmon, Llanarmon Dyffryn Ceiriog	APC (1845)	
St John the Baptist, Pontfadog	1847	
Former churches	Founded (build)	Closed
St Mary, Betws Gwerful Goch	APC	
St Mark, Frongoch	1858	
St Michael, Llanfihangel Glen Myfyr	APC	2020^{1}
SS Mor & Deiniol, Llanfor^{2}	APC	1992
All Saints, Llangar	APC	1856
St Jerome, Llangwm	APC (1747)	
St Cywair, Llangywer	APC (1871)	c. 2000
St Deiniol, Llanuwchllyn	APC	2004
St Beuno, Llanycil	APC	c. 2000
St James, Llawrybetws	1861	
Pentrefoelas Parish Church	C18th (1859)	
Holy Trinity, Rhosygwaliau	1880	
St John the Baptist, Ysbyty Ifan	APC (1861)	2016
St Catherine, Maerdy	1878	c. 2022
St Derfel, Llandderfel	APC	c. 2023^{1}
St Mary, Eglwyseg	1870	1985
St James, Glan-yr-afon	1864	
St Ffraid, Llansantffraid Glyn Ceiriog	MC (1790)	
St Beuno, Gwyddelwern	APC	
St Aelhaearn, Llanaelhaearn	APC	C17th
St John, Llangollen	1858	2020

^{1}occasional services still held ^{2}original dedication to St Deiniol

=== Archdeaconry of St Asaph ===
==== Aberconwy Mission Area ====
This was formed by the union of the parishes of Bryn Pydew, Craigydon, Deganwy, Eglwysrhos, Llanddoget, Llandudno Junction, Llangystenin, Llanrwst, Llansantffraid Glan Conwy and Penrhyn Bay. It is named after the former district of Aberconwy. It has an estimated population of 33,954. As of September 2024 it was served by two Priests-in-Charge and an Associate Priest.

Church	Founded (building)	
All Saints, Deganwy	late C19th (1899)	
St Michael & All Angels, Llandudno Junction	1930	
SS Eleri & Mary, Llanrhos^{2}	APC	
St Martin, Eglwysbach	APC (1782)	
St Paul, Craig-y-Don	1895	
St Cystennin, Llangystennin	APC (1843)	
St David, Penrhyn Bay	1963	
St Grwst, Llanrwst	APC	
St Bridget, Llansantffraid Glan Conwy	APC (1841)	
Former churches	Founded (build)	Closed
St Garmon, Capel Garmon	MC	pre-2006
St Mary, Llanrwst	1841-1842	1980s
St Doged, Llandoged^{1}	APC	2020
St Catherine, Bryn Pydew	early C20th (1961)	2020

^{1}Occasional services still held ^{2}original dedication to St Eleri

==== Aber-Morfa Mission Area ====
This was formed by the union of the parishes of Bodelwyddan, Rhuddlan, Rhyl Holy Trinity, Rhyl St Ann, Rhyl St Thomas and Towyn. It is named after ?. It has an estimated population of 41,017. As of September 2024 it was served by one Mission Area Leader, two Priests-in-Charge and one Transition Minister.

Church	Founded (building)	
St Margaret, Bodelwyddan	1860	
St Mary, Rhuddlan	APC	
Holy Trinity, Rhyl	1835	
St Thomas, Rhyl	1867	
St Ann, Rhyl	1894	
St Mary, Towyn	1873	
Former churches	Founded (build)	Closed
St John the Evangelist, Rhyl	1885	1997

==== Aled Mission Area ====
This was formed by the union of the parishes of Abergele, Betws-Yn-Rhos, Brynymaen, Colwyn, Colwyn Bay St David, Colwyn St Paul, Llanddulas, Llandrillo-Yn-Rhos St George, Llandrillo-Yn-Rhos St Trillo, Llanelian, Llanfair Talhaearn, Llangernyw, Llysfaen, Pensarn and St George. It is named after the River Aled. It has an estimated population of 47,402. As of September 2024 it was served by three Priests in Charge.

Church	Founded (building)	
St Michael, Abergele	APC	
St David, Pensarn	1880 (2011)	
St George, St George^{1}	APC (1893)	
St Michael, Betws yn Rhos	APC (1838)	
St Elian, Llanelian	APC	
St David, Colwyn Bay	1903	
St Paul, Colwyn Bay	1872 (1888)	
Christ Church, Bryn-y-Maen	1899	
St Cynfryd, Llanddulas	APC (1869)	
St Mary, Llanfair Talhaiarn	APC (C17th)	
St Digain, Llangernyw	APC	
St Sannan, Llansannan	APC	
St Cynfran, Llysfaen	APC	
SS Catherine & John the Baptist, Old Colwyn^{2}	1903	
St George, Rhos-on-Sea	1913	
St Trillo's Chapel, Rhos Trillo	MC	
St Trillo, Llandrillo-yn-Rhos	APC	
Former churches	Founded (build)	Closed
St John, Trofarth	1873	c. 2009
St Andrew, Colwyn Bay	1908	2013
St Winifred, Gwytherin	APC (1867)	
St John the Baptist, Pontygwyddel	1882	1982
St Catherine, Old Colwyn	1837	2013
St David, Pandy Tudur or Llanddewi	1866-1867	

1original dedication to the Welsh saint Siôr 2original dedication to St John the Baptist

==== Bryn a Mor Mission Area ====
This was formed by the union of the parishes of Cwm, Dyserth St Bridget, Dyserth SS Mael & Sulien, Dyserth St Michael, Ffynnongroyw, Gronant, Gwaenysgor, Llanasa, Meliden St Mary Magdalene, Meliden St Melyd, Newmarket/Trelawnyd, Prestatyn Christ Church and Prestatyn Holy Spirit. It is named after the hills (bryn) and sea (mor) which dominate the landscape. It has an estimated population of 26,718. As of September 2024 it was served by one Mission Area Leader.

Church	Founded (building)	
SS Bridget & Cwyfan, Dyserth^{1}	APC	
St Michael & All Angels, Trelawnyd	APC (1724)	
SS Asaph & Cyndeyrn, Llanasa^{2}	APC	
All Saints, Ffynnongroew	1881	
St Mary Magdalene, Gwaenysgor	APC	
St Melyd, Meliden	APC	
Christ Church, Prestatyn	1863	
Holy Spirit, Prestatyn	1968	
Former churches	Founded (build)	Closed
SS Mael & Sulien, Cwm	APC (c. 1500)	
St Winifred, Gronant		C21st

^{1}original dedication to St Cwyfan ^{2}original dedication to St Asaph

==== Denbigh Mission Area ====
This was formed in 2018 by the union of the parishes of Bodfari, Bylchau, Caerwys, Cefn, Denbigh St Marcella, Denbigh St Mary, Henllan, Llandyrnog St Cwyfan, Llandyrnog St Tyrnog, Llangwyfan, Llannefydd, Llanrhaeadr-Yng-Nghinmeirch, Nantglyn, Sinan, Trefnant and Tremeirchion. It is named after Denbigh, the principal town. It has an estimated population of 18,223. As of September 2024 it was served by one Mission Area Leader and one Associate Priest.

Church	Founded (building)	
St Stephen, Bodfari	APC (1865)	
St Mary the Virgin, Denbigh	1875	
St Marchell, Llanfarchell, Old Denbigh	APC	
St Sadwrn, Henllan	APC (1806)	
St Tyrnog, Llandyrnog	APC	
St Cwyfan, Llangwyfan	APC	
St Dyfnog, Llanrhaeadr-yng-Nghinmeirch	APC	
St James, Nantglyn	APC (1862)	
Holy Trinity, Trefnant	1855	
Corpus Christi, Tremeirchion	APC	
St Michael, Caerwys	APC	
SS Nefydd & Mary, Llannefydd^{1}	APC	
Former churches	Founded (build)	Closed
St Thomas, Bylchau	1857	c. 2019
St David (Leicester's Church), Denbigh	1578-1584	Never completed
St Hilary, Denbigh	MC	1874
St David, Denbigh	1838 (1895)	C20th
St James, Prion	1859	2008
St Mary, Cefn Meiriadog	1864	2023
All Saints, Sinan	1873	2023
Capel Hwlcyn, Aberwheeler	MC	C17th

^{1}original dedication to St Nefydd

==== Dyffryn Clwyd Mission Area ====
This was formed by the union of the parishes of Clocaenog, Efenechtyd, Gyffylliog, Llanarmon Yn Ial, Llanbedr Dyffryn Clwyd, Llanelidan, Llanfair Dyffryn Clwyd, Llanfwrog, Llangynhafal, Llanrhydd, Llanychan, Llanynys, Rhewl and Ruthin. It is named after the Vale of Clwyd. It has an estimated population of 12,291. As of September 2024 it was served by one Mission Area Leader, two Priests in Charge and one Associate Priest.

Church	Founded (building)	
St Foddhyd, Clocaenog	APC	
St Mary, Cyffylliog	MC	
St Michael, Efenechtyd	APC	
St Garmon, Llanarmon-yn-Iâl	APC (1736)	
(New) St Peter, Llanbedr Dyffryn Clwyd	1863	
St Meugan, Llanrhydd, Old Ruthin	APC	
SS Cynfarch & Mary, Llanfair Dyffryn Clwyd^{1}	APC	
St Cynhafal, Llangynhafal	APC	
St Hychan, Llanychan	APC	
St Saeran, Llanynys	APC	
Minster of St Peter, Ruthin	MC (1310) (C17th)	
SS Mwrog & Mary, Llanfwrog^{1}	APC	
Former churches	Founded (build)	Closed
St Mary, Derwen	APC	1999
St David, Eryrys	1862	1980s
St Elidan, Llanelidan	APC	2020
Rhewl Church		
(Old) St Peter, Llanbedr Dyffryn Clwyd	APC	1864
Jesus Chapel, Llanfair Dyffryn Clwyd	1619 (1787)	c. 2000

^{1}additional dedication to St Mary added later

==== Elwy Mission Area ====
This was formed from the parish of St Asaph. It is named after the River Elwy. It has an estimated population of 3,730. As of September 2024 it was served by one Dean and one Canon Precentor.

Church	Founded (building)
Cathedral of SS Asaph & Cyndeyrn, St Asaph	Ancient
SS Asaph & Cyndeyrn, St Asaph	APC (1872)

==== Estuary and Mountain Mission Area ====
This was formed by the union of the parishes of Bagillt, Brynford, Caerfallwch, Flint SS Mary & David, Flint St Thomas, Gorsedd, Halkyn, Holywell Holy Trinity, Holywell St James, Holywell St Peter, Mostyn, Rhesycae, Rhosesmor, Whitford and Ysgeifiog. It is named after the natural features in the area. It has an estimated population of 35,943. As of September 2024 it was served by one Mission Area Leader, four Priests in Charge and one Assistant Curate.

Church	Founded (building)	
St Peter, Holywell	1849 (2008)	
Holy Trinity, Greenfield	1871	
SS Mary & Peter, Bagillt^{1}	1839	
St Michael, Brynford	1853	
SS Mary & David, Flint^{1}	MC (1848)	
St Thomas, Flint Mountain	1875	
St Mary the Virgin, Halkyn	APC (1878)	
Christ Church, Rhes-y-cae	1847	
St Paul, Rhosesmor	1876	
St James the Apostle, Holywell^{3}	APC (1769)	
Christ Church, Mostyn	1845	
SS Mary & Beuno, Whitford^{2}	APC	
St Paul, Gorsedd	1853	
St Mary, Ysceifiog	APC (1839)	
Former churches	Founded (build)	Closed
St David, Flint	1872	2011
St Peter, Bagillt	c. 1890	2012

^{1}originally dedicated to St Mary alone ^{2}original dedication to St Beuno ^{3}original dedication to St Winefride

=== Archdeaconry of Wrexham ===
==== Alyn Mission Area ====
This was formed by the union of the parishes of Broughton, Brymbo, Bwlchgwyn, Gresford, Gwersyllt, Holt, Isycoed, Llay, Minera St Mary, Minera St Tydfil, Pentre Broughton, Rossett and Southsea. It is named after the River Alyn. It has an estimated population of 45,673. As of September 2024 it was served by one Mission Area Leader and two Curates.

Church	Founded (building)	
All Saints, Gresford	APC	
St Paul, Pentre Broughton	1889	
All Saints, Southsea	1884 (1984)	
Christ Church, Bwlchgwyn	1867	
St Tydfil, Coedpoeth	1875 (1895)	
Holy Trinity, Gwersyllt	1851	
St Chad, Holt	MC	
St Paul, Isycoed	1718 (1829)	
St Martin of Tours, Llay	1925	
St Mary, Minera	C17th (1866)	
Christ Church, Rossett	1841 (1892)	
Former churches	Founded (build)	Closed
St Peter, Brynteg	1894	2006
St Paul, Berse Drelincourt	1742	pre-2010
St John, Brymbo	1837 (1891)	1974
St Alban, Tanyfron	1896	2010
St Peter, Rhosrobin	1881 (1898)	
St Mary, Brymbo	1838 (1871)	2023

==== Borderlands Mission Area ====
This covers the former parishes of Broughton, Connah's Quay St David, Connah's Quay St Mark, Hawarden, Queensferry, Sandycroft, Sealand and Shotton. It is named after the Welsh-English border. It and Rhos a Mynydd have an estimated population of 81,940 and, as of September 2024, were served by one Mission Area Leader, two Priests in Charge and one Associate Priest.

Church	Founded (building)	
St Mary, Broughton	1824	
St Mark, Connah's Quay	1837	
St David, Connah's Quay	1915	
St Deiniol, Hawarden	APC (1859)	
St Bartholomew, Sealand	1867	
St Andrew, Garden City, Queensferry	pre-1900	
St Ethelwold, Shotton	1875 (1902)	
Former churches	Founded (build)	Closed
St Michael & All Angels, Mancot Royal		
Holy Innocents, Queensferry	1887 (1889)	1960
St Francis, Sandycroft^{1}	1875 (1913)	c. 2022

^{1}original dedication to St Ambrose

==== Maelor Mission Area ====
This was formed by the union of the parishes of Bangor Monachorum, Bettisfield, Bronington, Erbistock, Eyton, Hanmer, Marchwiel, Overton, Penley and Worthenbury. It is named after the historical area of the Maelor. It has an estimated population of 8,672. As of September 2024 it was served by one Mission Area Leader and one Assistant Curate.

Church	Founded (building)	
St Dunawd, Bangor-on-Dee	APC	
Holy Trinity, Bronington	1836	
St Hilary, Erbistock^{3}	APC (1861)	
St Chad, Hanmer	APC (1892)	
St Mary Magdalene, Penley	MC (1901)	
SS Deiniol & Marcella, Marchwiel^{1}	APC (1778)	
St Mary the Virgin, Overton-on-Dee	APC	
Former churches	Founded (build)	Closed
St Mary Magdalene, Tallarn Green	1851 (1873)	2007
St Deiniol, Eyton	1939	2022
St John the Baptist, Bettisfield^{2}	1851 (1874)	2023
St Deiniol, Worthenbury	MC (1739)	2022

^{1}original dedication to St Deiniol ^{2}occasional services still held (Pilgrim Church status) ^{3}original dedication to St Erbin

==== Mold Mission Area ====
This was formed by the union of the parishes of New Brighton, Cilcain, Gwernaffield, Llanferres, Mold, Nannerch, Nercwys, Northop SS Eurgain & Peter, Northop St Mary, Pontblyddyn, Rhyd-Y-Mwyn and Treuddyn. It is named after Mold, the principal town. It has an estimated population of 26,115. As of September 2024 it was served by three Priests-in-Charge, one Mission Area Priest and one Assistant Curate.

Church	Founded (building)	
St James, New Brighton	1893	
St Mary, Cilcain	APC	
St John the Evangelist, Rhydymwyn	1864	
Holy Trinity, Gwernaffield	1838 (1872)	
Christ Church, Pontblyddyn	1836	
St Mary, Mold	APC (c. 1500)	
St Michael & All Angels, Nannerch	APC (1853)	
St Mary, Nercwys	MC	
SS Eurgain & Peter, Northop^{1}	APC	
St Mary, Treuddyn	MC (1875)	
St Berres, Llanferres	APC	
Former churches	Founded (build)	Closed
St John the Evangelist, Mold	1879	
St Mary, Northop Hall	c. 1890 (1912)	2020

^{1}original dedication to St Eurgain

==== Offa Mission Area ====
This was formed by the union of the parishes of Chirk, Froncysyllte, Penycae, Rhosllanerchrugog St David, Rhosllanerchrugog St Mary, Rhosymedre, Ruabon All Saints and Ruabon St Mary. It is named after Offa's Dyke. It has an estimated population of 29,407. As of September 2024 it was served by one Mission Area Leader, one Priest in Charge, one Associate Priest and three Assistant Curates.

Church	Founded (building)	
St John the Evangelist, Rhosymedre	1837	
St Mary, Chirk^{1}	APC	
St David, Froncysyllte	1871	
St Thomas, Penycae	1878	
St Mary, Johnstown	1929	
St Mary, Ruabon	APC	
All Saints, Pen-y-lan	1889	
Former churches	Founded (build)	Closed
Halton Mission Church	1878	pre-1998
St David, Rhosllanerchrugog	1893	c. 2020
St John the Evangelist, Rhosllanerchrugog	1853	2005

^{1}original dedication to St Tysilio

==== Rhos a Mynydd Mission Area ====
This covers the former parishes of Bistre All Saints, Bistre Emmanuel, Bistre St Cecilia, Buckley Good Shepherd, Buckley St Matthew, Cymau, Ewloe, Hope, Llanfynydd, Mynydd Isa, Pentrobin and Penyffordd. The churches in this area were originally part of the Borderlands Mission Area, but this was deemed unworkably large and these churches split off to form the new Mission Area in 2024. For population and clergy numbers see Borderlands.

Church	Founded (building)	
St Cecilia, Mynydd Isa	1892	
Holy Spirit, Ewloe	1938	
The Good Shepherd, Drury	late C19th	
St Matthew, Buckley	1822 (1905)	
St Cynfarch, Hope	APC	
St Michael & All Angels, Llanfynydd	1843	
Emmanuel, Penyffordd	1881 (1959)	
Emmanuel, Bistre, Buckley	1842	
All Saints, Buckley	pre-1892 (1892)	
St John the Baptist, Penmynydd, Pentrobin	1843	
Former churches	Founded (build)	Closed
All Saints, Cymau	1870	2023

==== Wrexham Mission Area ====
This was formed by the union of the parishes of Bersham, Esclusham, Rhosddu, Wrexham All Saints, Wrexham St Giles, Wrexham St James, Wrexham St John, Wrexham St Margaret and Wrexham St Mark. It is named after Wrexham. It has an estimated population of 48,457. As of September 2024 it was served by one Mission Area Leader, one Priest in Charge and one Assistant Curate.

Church	Founded (building)	
St Mary, Bersham	1873	
Holy Trinity, Esclusham	1877	
St John, Rhosnesni	1894 (1974)	
St Mark, Caia Park	1961	
St Giles, Wrexham	APC	
All Saints, Wrexham	1912	
St Margaret, Garden Village	1928	
Hope Street Church, Wrexham	2021	
Former churches	Founded (build)	Closed
St Peter, Wrexham	1910	C20th
St Mark, Wrexham	1858	1956
St John the Baptist, Wrexham	1909	1998
St David, Wrexham	1890	
St James, Rhosddu	1875	2024

== Dedications ==
=== Medieval churches ===
- All Saints: Buttington, Gresford, Llangar, Mochdre
- Corpus Christi: Tremeirchion
- St Aelhaiarn: Guilsfield, Llanaelhaearn
- St Asaph: Llanasa
- SS Asaph & Kentigern: St Asaph Cathedral, St Asaph
- St Berres: Llanferres
- St Beuno: Berriew, Bettwscedewain, Gwyddelwern, Llanycil, Whitford
- St Bridget: Llansantffraidglanconwy, Llansantffraidglynceiriog, Llansantffraidglyndyfrdwy, Llansantffraidymmechan
- St Cadfan: Llangadfan
- St Cadwaladr: Llangadwaladr
- St Cedwyn: Llangedwyn
- St Chad: Hanmer, Holt
- St Collen: Llangollen
- St Constantine: Llangystennin
- St Cwyfan: Dyserth, Llangwyfan
- St Cynfarch: Hope, Llanfairdyffrynclwyd
- St Cynfran: Llysfaen
- St Cynfryd: Llanddulas
- St Cynhafal: Llangynhafal
- St Cynog: Llangynog
- St Cynon: Tregynon
- St Cynyw: Llangynyw
- St Cywair: Llangywer
- St Deiniol: Hawarden, Llanfor, Llanuwchllyn, Marchwiel, Worthenbury
- St Derfel: Llandderfel
- St Digain: Llangernyw
- St Doged: Llandoged
- St Dogfan: Llanrhaeadrymmochnant
- St Dunawd: Bangor-on-Dee
- St Dyfnog: Llanrhaeadryngnghinmeirch
- St Eigen: Northop
- St Elian: Llanelian
- St Elidan: Llanelidan
- St Erbin: Erbistock
- St Erfyl: Llanerfyl
- St Foddhyd: Clocaenog
- St Germanus: Capelgarmon, Castlecaereinion, Llanarmondyffrynceiriog, Llanarmonmynyddmawr, Llanarmonynial, Llanfechain
- St Giles: Wrexham
- St Grwst: Llanrwst
- St Gwyddelan: Llanwyddelan
- St Gwynog: Aberhafesp
- St Hilary: Denbigh, Erbistock, Llanrhos
- St Hychan: Llanychan
- St Illog: Hirnant
- St James: Nantglyn
- St Jerome: Llangwm
- St John the Baptist: Ysbytyifan
- St Llwchaiarn: Llanllwchaiarn, Llanmerewig
- SS Maël & Sulien: Corwen, Cwm
- St Marchell: Llanfarchell
- St Martin: Eglwysbach
- St Mary: Betwsgwerfulgoch, Cilcain, Cyffylliog, Derwen, Flint, Halkyn, Llanfaircaereinion, Llanfairdyffrynclwyd, Llanfairtalhaiarn, Llanllugan, Mold, Nercwys, Newtown, Overton, Rhuddlan, Ruabon, Treuddyn, Welshpool, Ysceifiog
- St Mary Magdalene: Cerrigydrudion, Gwaenysgor, Penley
- St Mawgan: Llanrhydd
- St Melangell: Pennantmelangell
- St Melyd: Meliden
- St Michael: Abergele, Betwsynrhos, Caerwys, Criggion, Efenechtyd, Forden, Kerry, Llanfihangelglynmyfyr, Llanfihangelyngngwynfa, Manafon, Nannerch, Trelawnyd
- St Mwrog: Llanfwrog
- St Myllin: Llanfyllin
- St Nefydd: Llannefydd
- St Nicholas: Montgomery
- St Peter: Llanbedrdyffrynclwyd, Ruthin
- St Sadwrn: Henllan
- St Saeran: Llanynys
- St Sannan: Llansannan
- St Sior: St George
- St Stephen: Bodfari
- St Sulien: Llansilin
- St Tegla: Llandegla
- St Trillo: Llandrilloynedeirnion, Llandrilloynrhos, Rhostrillo
- St Trinio: Llandrinio
- St Tydecho: Garthbeibio
- St Tyrnog: Llandyrnog
- St Tysilio: Bryneglwys, Chirk, Llandysilio (Montgomeryshire), Llantysilio (Denbighshire), Meifod
- St Tysul: Llandyssil
- St Winifred: Gwytherin, Holywell
- St Wyddyn: Llanwddyn

=== Post-medieval churches ===
- All Saints: Buckley (C19th), Cymau (1870), Deganwy (1899), Ffynnongroew (1881), Newtown (1890), Penylan (1889), Sinan (1873), Southsea (1884), Wrexham (1912)
- Christ Church: Bala (1811), Brynymaen (1899), Bwlchgwyn (1867), Bwlchycibau (1864), Mostyn (1845), Pontblyddyn (1836), Prestatyn (1863), Rhesycae (1847), Rossett (1841), Welshpool (1839)
- Emmanuel: Buckley (1842), Penyffordd (1881)
- Good Shepherd: Drury (C19th)
- Holy Innocents: Queensferry (1887)
- Holy Spirit: Ewloe (1938), Prestatyn (1968)
- Holy Trinity: Bronington (1836), Esclusham (1877), Greenfield (1871), Gwernaffield (1838), Gwersyllt (1851), Penrhos (1625), Rhosygwaliau (1880), Rhyl (1835), Trefnant (1855)
- Jesus: Llanfairdyffrynclwyd (1619)
- St Alban: Tanyfron (1896)
- St Ambrose: Sandycroft (1875)
- St Andrew: Colwyn Bay (1908), Garden City (C19th)
- St Anne: Rhyl (1894)
- St Bartholomew: Sealand (1867)
- St Catherine: Brynpydew (C20th), Maerdy (1878), Old Colwyn (1837)
- St Cecilia: Mynyddisa (1892)
- St David: Colwyn Bay (1903), Connah's Quay (1915), Denbigh (1838), Eryrys (1862), Flint (1872), Froncysyllte (1871), Newtown (1843), Pandytudur (1867), Penrhyn Bay (1963), Pensarn (1880), Rhosllanerchrugog (1893), Wrexham (1890)
- St Deiniol: Eyton (1939)
- St Ethelwold: Shotton (1875)
- St Francis: Sandycroft (1913)
- St George: Rhos-on-Sea (1913)
- St James: Glanyrafon (1864), Llawrybetws (1861), New Brighton (1893), Prion (1859), Rhosddu (1875)
- St John the Baptist: Bettisfield (1851), Old Colwyn (1903), Penmynydd (1843), Pontfadog (1847), Pontygwyddel (1882), Wrexham (1909)
- St John the Evangelist: Brymbo (1837), Cynwyd (1856), Dolanog (1853), Garthmyl (C19th), Llangollen (1858), Mold (1879), Pontrobert (1853), Pool Quay (1862), Rhosllanerchrugog (1853), Rhosnesni (1894), Rhosymedre (1837), Rhydymwyn (1864), Rhyl (1885), Trofarth (1873)
- St Margaret: Bodelwyddan (1860), Garden Village (1928)
- St Mark: Caia Park (1961), Connah's Quay (1837), Frongoch (1858), Wrexham (1858)
- St Martin: Llay (1925)
- St Mary: Bagillt (1839), Bersham (1873), Brithdir (1892), Broughton (1824), Brymbo (1838), Cefnmeiriadog (1864), Denbigh (1875), Eglwyseg (1870), Johnstown (1929), Llanrwst (1842), Llwydiarth (1854), Minera (C17th), Northop Hall (1890), Towyn (1873)
- St Mary Magdalene: Tallarn Green (1851)
- St Matthew: Buckley (1822)
- St Michael: Brynford (1853), Llandudno Junction (1930), Llanfynydd (1843), Mancot Royal (?)
- St Paul: Berse (1742), Colwyn Bay (1872), Craigydon (1895), Dolfor (C19th), Gorsedd (1853), Isycoed (1718), Pentre Broughton (1889), Rhosesmor (1876)
- St Peter: Bagillt (1890), Brynteg (1894), Holywell (1849), Llanbedrdyffrynclwyd (1863), Rhosrobin (1881), Wrexham (1910)
- St Thomas: Bylchau (1857), Flint Mountain (1875), Glyndyfrdwy (1859), Penybontfawr (1855), Penycae (1878), Rhyl (1867)
- St Tydfil: Coedpoeth (1875)
- St Winifred: Gronant (C20th)
- St Wyddyn: Llanwddyn new (1887)
- No dedication/dedication unknown: Belan (1840), Halton (1878), Pantyffridd (1858), Pentrefoelas (C18th), Rhewl (?), Rhiwlas (?), Trevor (1772), Trewern (C19th), Wrexham (2021)

== Churches in 1895 ==
From Slater's Directory of North and Mid Wales, arranged by deanery and parish.

=== Archdeaconry of Montgomery ===
==== Deanery of Caereinion ====
- Parish of Garthbeibio: St Tydecho's Church (rebuilt 1862)
- Parish of Llanerfyl: St Erfyl's Church (rebuilt 1870)
- Parish of Llanfair-Caereinion: St Mary's Church (rebuilt 1868)
- Parish of Llangadfan: St Cadfan's Church
- Parish of Llangyniew: St Cyniw's Church
- Parish of Llanllugan: St Mary's Church
- Parish of Llanwyddelan: St Gwyddelan's Church
- Parish of Manafon: St Michael's Church
- Parish of Meifod: St Tysilio's Church
- Parish of Pont-Dolanog (EP formed 1856 from Llanerfyl)
- Parish of Pont-Robert (EP formed 1854 from Meifod): St John the Evangelist's Church (1852)

==== Deanery of Cedewain ====
- Parish of Aberhafesp: St Gwynog's Church
- Parish of Bettws-Cedewain: St Beuno's Church
- Parish of Dolfor (EP formed 1876 from Kerry): St Paul's Church
- Parish of Kerry: St Michael's Church
- Parish of Llandyssil: St Tysilio's New Church (1866)
- Parish of Llanmerewig: St Llwchaiarn's Church
- Parish of Llanllwchaiarn: St Llwchaiarn's Church (rebuilt 1815) --- All Saints' Chapel of Ease (1888)
- Parish of Mochdre: All Saints' Church (rebuilt 1867)
- Parish of Newtown: St David's Church (1847)
- Parish of Sarn (EP formed 1860 from Churchstoke and Kerry) (or in St David's diocese?): Holy Trinity Church (voted to join Church of England in 1915)
- Parish of Tregynon: St Cynon's Church

==== Deanery of Llanfylllin ====
- Parish of Bwlch-y-cibau (EP formed 1865 from Llanfechan, Llanfyllin, Llansantffraid and Meifod): Christ Church (1865)
- Parish of Hirnant: St Illog's Church
- Parish of Llanarmon-Mynydd-Mawr: St Garmon's Church
- Parish of Llanfechan: St Garmon's Church
- Parish of Llanfihangel-yn-Gwyswa: St Michael's Church
- Parish of Llanfyllin: St Myllin's Church (rebuilt 1806) --- Mission Church (1892)
- Parish of Llangedwyn: St Cedwyn's Church
- Parish of Llangynog: St Cynog's Church --- St Melangell's Church, Pennant-Melangell
- Parish of Llanrhaiadr-ym-Mochnant: St Dogfan's Church
- Parish of Llansantffraid-ym-Mechain: St Ffraid's Church
- Parish of Llanwddyn: St John the Baptist's New Church (1888)
- Parish of Llwydiarth (EP formed 1859 from Llanfihangel and Llangadfan): St Mary's Church
- Parish of Pennant: St Thomas's Church, Pen-y-bont-fawr (1845)

==== Deanery of Oswestry ====
- Parish of Llangadwaladr: St Cadwaladr's Church
- Parish of Llansilin: St Silin's Church
- Parish of Llanymynech (mostly in England): St Agatha's Church (rebuilt 1845) (voted to join Church of England in 1915)

==== Deanery of Pool ====
- Parish of Berriew: St Beuno's Church
- Parish of Buttington (EP formed from Welshpool): All Saints' Church
- Parish of Castle Caereinion: St Garmon's Church
- Parish of Guilsfield: St Aelhaiarn's Church
- Parish of Leighton: Holy Trinity Church (now in Diocese of Hereford)
- Parish of Llandrinio: St Trinio's Church
- Parish of Llandysilio: St Tysilio's Church
- Parish of Pool Quay (EP formed 1863 from Guilsfield and Welshpool): St John the Evangelist's Church
- Parish of Welshpool: St Mary's Church --- Christ Church --- Llwynderw/Belan Chapel of Ease

=== Archdeaconry of St Asaph ===
==== Deanery of Denbigh ====
- Parish of Aberwheeler: no church
- Parish of Bodfari: St Stephen's Church
- Parish of Caerwys: St Michael's Church
- Parish of Denbigh: St Marcellus' Church, Whitchurch (semi-disused) --- St Hilary's Church, Denbigh --- St Mary's Church, Denbigh (1874) --- St David's Church, Denbigh (rebuilt 1894)
- Parish of Henllan: St Sadwrn's Church (rebuilt 1806)
- Parish of Llandyrnog: St Tyrnog's Church
- Parish of Llangwyfan: St Cwyfan's Church
- Parish of Llannefydd: St Mary's Church
- Parish of Llanrhaiadr-yng-Nghinmeirch: St Dynfog's Church
- Parish of Llansannan: St Sannan's Church
- Parish of Nantglyn: St James' Church
- Parish of Prion (EP formed 1859 from Llanrhaiadr-yng-Nghinmeirch): St James' Church
- Parish of Trefnant (EP formed 1855 from Henllan): Holy Trinity Church (1855)

==== Deanery of Dyffryn Clwyd ====
- Parish of Clocaenog: St Trillo's Church
- Parish of Cyffylliog: St Mary's Church
- Parish of Derwen: St Mary's Church
- Parish of Efenechtyd: St Michael's Church
- Parish of Eryrys (EP formed 1861 from Llanarmon-yn-Yale): St David's Church
- Parish of Llanarmon-yn-Yale: St Garmon's Church
- Parish of Llanbedr-Dyffryn-Clwyd: St Peter's Church
- Parish of Llandegla: St Tecla's Church
- Parish of Llanelidan: St Elidan's Church
- Parish of Llanfair-Dyffryn-Clwyd: St Mary's Church --- Jesus Chapel of Ease
- Parish of Llanfwrog: St Mwrog's Church
- Parish of Llangynhafal: St James's Church
- Parish of Llanynys: St Saeran's Church --- Llanrhydd Church
- Parish of Ruthin: St Peter's Church

==== Deanery of Llanrwst ====
- Parish of Capel Garmon: St Garmon's Church
- Parish of Deganwy (EP formed from Eglwysrhos?): St James' Church
- Parish of Eglwysbach: St Martin's Church (rebuilt 1782)
- Parish of Eglwysrhos or Llanrhos: St Eleri's Church --- Penrhyn Side Mission Room
- Parish of Gwytherin: St James' Church (rebuilt 1869)
- Parish of Llanddewi (EP formed 1867 from Llangerniew): St David's Church (1867)
- Parish of Llanddoget: St Dogfan's Church (rebuilt 1839)
- Parish of Llangerniew: St Digain's Church
- Parish of Llangwstennin: St Cwstenin's Church
- Parish of Llanrwst: St Grwst's Church --- St Mary's Chapel of Ease (1842)
- Parish of Llansantffraid-Glan-Conwy: St Ffraid's Church
- Parish of Pentre-foelas: Parish Church (1857)
- Parish of Yspytty Ifan: St John the Baptist's Church

==== Deanery of Rhos ====
- Parish of Abergele: St Michael's Church --- St David's Chapel of Ease, Pensarn
- Parish of Bettws-yn-Rhos: St Michael's Church
- Parish of Colwyn Bay (EP formed 1893 from Llandrillo-yn-Rhos): St Paul's Church --- St Paul's Mission Room
- Parish of Eirias: St Catherine's Church, Old Colwyn (1837)
- Parish of Llanddulas: St Cynbryd's Church
- Parish of Llandrillo-yn-Rhos: St Trillo's Church
- Parish of Llanelian: St Eleri's Church
- Parish of Llanfair-Talhaiarn: St Mary's Church
- Parish of Llysfaen: St Cynfran's Church
- Parish of St George: St Sior's Old Church --- St Sior's New Church (1893)
- Parish of Towyn (EP formed 1873 from Abergele): St Mary's Church (1873)

==== Deanery of St Asaph ====
- Parish of Bodelwyddan (EP formed 1860 from St Asaph): St Margaret's Church (1856-60)
- Parish of Cefn (EP formed 1865 from St Asaph): St Mary's Church (1865)
- Parish of Cwm: St Valacinian's Church
- Parish of Dyserth: St Bridget's Church
- Parish of Gwaenysgor: St Mary's Church
- Parish of Meliden: St Melydd's Church
- Parish of Newmarket: St Michael's Church
- Parish of Prestatyn (EP formed 1860 from Meliden): Christ Church
- Parish of Rhuddlan: St Mary's Church
- Parish of Rhyl (EP formed 1844 from Rhuddlan): Holy Trinity Church (1835) --- St Thomas' Church (1861-69) --- St John the Evangelist's Church (1885-87) --- St Anne's Mission Church (1895)
- Parish of St Asaph: St Asaph's Cathedral --- SS Cyndeyrn & Asaph's Church
- Parish of Tremeirchion: Holy Trinity Church

=== Archdeaconry of Wrexham ===
==== Deanery of Bangor-ys-y-Coed ====
- Parish of Bangor-is-y-Coed: St Dinoth's Church
- Parish of Bettisfield: St John the Baptist's Church (1874)
- Parish of Bronington: Holy Trinity Church (1836)
- Parish of Erbistock: St Hilary's Church
- Parish of Hanmer: St Chad's Church (rebuilt 1890) --- St Mary Magdalene's Chapel of Ease, Tallarn Green
- Parish of Is-y-Coed (EP formed 1826 from Holt): St Paul's Church (1829)
- Parish of Marchwiel: St Deiniol's Church (1835)
- Parish of Overton: St Mary's Church
- Parish of Threapwood (partly in Cheshire): St John's Church (1815)
- Parish of Whitewell: St Mary's Church
- Parish of Worthenbury: St Deiniol's Church (1755)

==== Deanery of Edeirnion ====
- Parish of Bettws-Gwerfil-Goch: St Mary's Church
- Parish of Corwen: St Julian's Church --- Rug Chapel
- Parish of Cerrig-y-druidion: St Mary Magdalene's Church
- Parish of Glyndyfrdwy (EP formed 1863 from Corwen): St Thomas' Church
- Parish of Gwyddelwern: St Beuno's Church
- Parish of Llanfihangel-Glyn-Myfyr: St Michael's Church
- Parish of Llangar: St John's Church, Cynwyd
- Parish of Llangwm: St Jerome's Church --- St Catherine's Mission Church, Maerdy
- Parish of Llawr-y-Bettws (EP formed 1864 from Gwyddelwern, Llandderfel and Llanfor): St James the Greater's Church

==== Deanery of Holywell ====
- Parish of Bagillt (EP formed 1844 from Holywell): St Mary's Church
- Parish of Brynford (EP formed 1853 from Holywell and Ysceifiog): St Michael's Church
- Parish of Connah's Quay (EP formed 1844 from Northop): St Mark's Church
- Parish of Ffynnon-Groew (EP formed 1883 from Llanasa): All Saints' Church
- Parish of Flint: St Mary's Church (rebuilt 1848) --- St David's Chapel of Ease, Pentre (1872) --- St Thomas' Chapel of Ease, Flint Common (1874)
- Parish of Gorsedd (EP formed 1853 from Whitford and Ysceifiog): St Paul's Church
- Parish of Halkyn: St Mary's Church (rebuilt 1740)
- Parish of Holywell: St Winifred's Church (rebuilt 1769) --- Holy Trinity Chapel of Ease, Greenfield (1873)
- Parish of Llanasa: St Asaph's Church
- Parish of Mostyn (EP formed from Whitford): Christ Church
- Parish of Rhes-y-cae (EP formed 1848 from Cilcen, Halkin and Ysceifiog): Christ Church
- Parish of Whitford: SS Beuno & Mary's Church
- Parish of Ysceifiog: St Mary's Church

==== Deanery of Llangollen ====
- Parish of Bryneglwys: St Tysilio's Church
- Parish of Llanarmon-Dyffryn-Ceiriog: St Garmon's Church
- Parish of Llangollen: St Collen's Church (rebuilt 1750) --- St John's Mission Chapel --- Trevor Issa Chapel of Ease --- Froncysyllte Chapel of Ease
- Parish of Llansantffraid-Glyn-Ceiriog: St Ffraid's Church
- Parish of Llansantffraid-Glyn-Dyfrdwy: St Ffraid's Church
- Parish of Llantysilio: St Tysilio's Church
- Parish of Pontfadog: St John the Baptist's Church
- Parish of St Martin's (in Shropshire): St Martin's Church, Ifton Rhyn --- Weston Rhyn Church
- Parish of The Lodge (in Shropshire) (EP formed 1870 from St Martin's): St John the Divine's Church (1878) --- Bron-y-Garth Mission Church

==== Deanery of Mold ====
- Parish of Bistre (EP formed 1842 from Mold): Emmanuel Church --- St Cecilia's Mission Church, Mynydd-Isa
- Parish of Buckley (EP formed 1874 from Hawarden): St Matthew's Church (1821)
- Parish of Caerfallwch (EP formed 1876 from Northop): St Paul's Church, Rhosesmor
- Parish of Cilcain: St Mary's Church
- Parish of Gwernaffield (EP formed 1839 from Mold): Holy Trinity Church
- Parish of Hawarden: St Deiniol's Church (rebuilt C16th) --- St Mary's Chapel of Ease, Broughton (1826) --- Holy Innocents Chapel of Ease, Pentre --- St Ambrose's Mission Church, Sandycroft
- Parish of Higher Kinnerton: All Saints' Chapel of Ease (to St Mary's Church, Dodleston)
- Parish of Hope: St Cynfarch's Church (rebuilt 1812)
- Parish of Llanferras: St Berres' Church (rebuilt 1722)
- Parish of Mold: St Mary's Church --- St John's Mission Church --- New Brighton Mission Room (1894) --- St Mary's Mission Church, Gwern-y-mynydd
- Parish of Nannerch: St Mary's Church
- Parish of Nerquis: St Mary's Church
- Parish of Northop: St Peter's Church (rebuilt C16th)
- Parish of Pen-y-mynydd (EP formed from Hawarden?): St John's Church
- Parish of Pont-Bleiddyn with Leeswood (EP formed 1836 from Mold): Christ Church, Pont-Bleiddyn
- Parish of Rhyd-y-mwyn (EP formed 1865 from Cilcain, Halkyn, Mold and Northop): St John the Evangelist's Church
- Parish of Saltney (EP formed from Hawarden?): St Mark's Church --- Saltney Ferry Mission Church
- Parish of Sealand (EP formed from Hawarden?): St Bartholomew's Church
- Parish of Trydden: St Mary's Church

==== Deanery of Penllyn ====
- Parish of Frongoch (EP formed 1859 from Llandderfel, Llanfor and Llanycil): St Mark's Church
- Parish of Llandderfel: St Derfel Gadarn's Church
- Parish of Llandrillo: St Trillo's Church
- Parish of Llanfor or Llanfawr: St Mor's Church
- Parish of Llangower: St Cywair's Church
- Parish of Llanuwchllyn: St Deiniol's Church
- Parish of Llan-y-cil: St Beuno's Church --- Christ Church Chapel of Ease, Bala
- Parish of Rhos-y-gwaliau (EP formed 1856 from Llanfor): Holy Trinity Church

==== Deanery of Wrexham ====
- Parish of Bersham/Berse (EP formed from Wrexham?): Parish Church
- Parish of Brymbo: St Mary's Church (1837) --- St Paul's Chapel of Ease, Broughton --- Southsea Chapel of Ease
- Parish of Bwlchgwyn (EP formed 1880 from Hope and Wrexham): Christ Church (1867)
- Parish of Chirk: St Mary's Church --- Halton Chapel of Ease --- Pentre Mission Room
- Parish of Esclusham (EP formed 1879 from Gresford and Wrexham): Holy Trinity Church, Rhostyllen
- Parish of Gresford: All Saints' Church --- Burton Mission Church
- Parish of Gwersyllt: Holy Trinity Church
- Parish of Holt: St Chad's Church (Transferred from Diocese of Chester in 1861.)
- Parish of Llanfynydd (EP formed 1845 from Hope): St Michael's Church (1842)
- Parish of Minera: St Mary's Church
- Parish of Pen-y-cae (EP formed 1879 from Ruabon): St Thomas' Church (1877) --- St David's Chapel of Ease (1895)
- Parish of Rhosddu (EP formed 1886 from Gresford and Wrexham): St James's Church --- Rhosnesney Mission Church
- Parish of Rhosllanerchrugog (EP formed 1844 from Ruabon): St John's Church (1851) --- St David's Chapel of Ease (1891) --- St Mary's Chapel of Ease, Johnstown (1891)
- Parish of Rhos-y-medre (EP formed 1844 from Ruabon): St John's Church (1836)
- Parish of Rossett (EP formed from Gresford): Christ Church (1894)
- Parish of Ruabon: St Mary's Church --- All Saints' Chapel of Ease, Bryn-Pen-y-lan (1889)
- Parish of Wrexham: St Giles' Church --- St Mark's Chapel of Ease (1858) --- St John the Baptist's Chapel of Ease (1876) --- St David's Church (1890) --- Abenbury Mission Church (1893) --- New Town or Ruthin Road Mission Church --- Hill Street Mission Room --- Coed-Poeth Mission Church

== See also ==
- Bishop of Saint Asaph
- Archdeacon of St Asaph

== Sources and references ==
- CATHOLIC ENCYCLOPEDIA: Ancient Diocese of Saint Asaph
