= St Meugan's Church, Llanrhydd =

Coordinates: 53.1101°N 3.2862°W

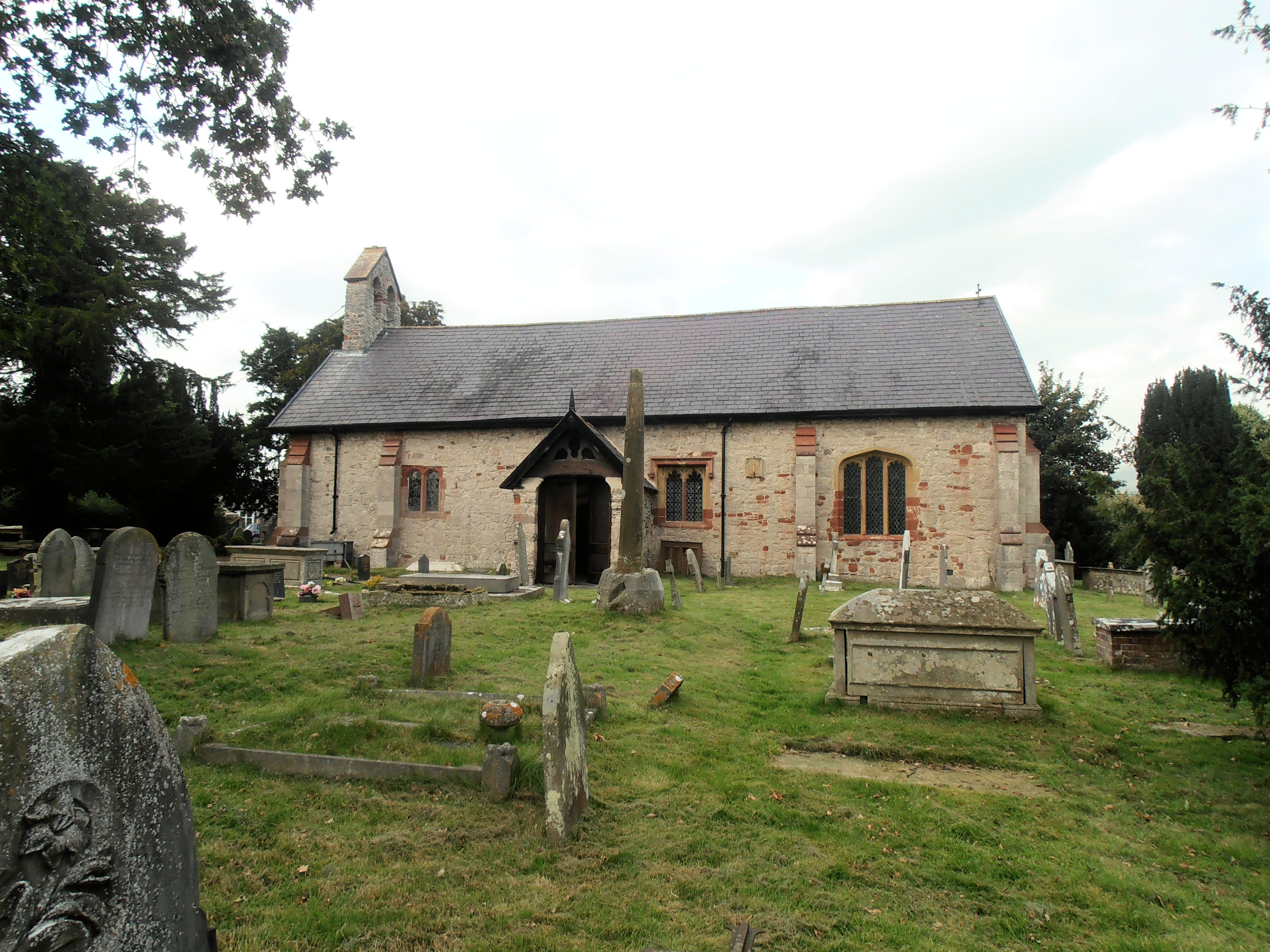

- Location in Denbighshire
- OS grid reference: SJ 140 577
- Location: Llanrhydd, Ruthin, Denbighshire
- Country: Wales
- Denomination: Church in Wales

History
- Dedication: Saint Mawgan

Architecture
- Functional status: Active
- Heritage designation: Grade I
- Designated: 24 October 1950
- Architectural type: Church
- Groundbreaking: 13th century with later additions

Specifications
- Materials: Body of church: rubble Roof: slate

Administration
- Diocese: St Asaph
- Archdeaconry: St Asaph
- Deanery: Dyffryn Clwyd
- Parish: Mission Area of Dyffryn Clwyd

St Meugan's Church was the original parish church of Ruthin, in Denbighshire, Wales. Located about 1.5 km east of the centre of the town, the church is dedicated to Saint Meugan, a Welsh saint of the 5th/6th centuries. Although with earlier origins, the present church dates to the 13th century, with additions and enlargements in the following two centuries. St Meugan's was later superseded as the parish church of the town by the more centrally located St Peter's Church. It remains an active church in the Diocese of St Asaph and is a Grade I listed building.

== History ==
The Church of St Meugan stands about a mile east of the town of Ruthin. It is dedicated to Saint Meugan, a Welsh saint of the 5th or 6th centuries. Cadw suggests that the dedication references the site of a 6th-century llan settlement. It was damaged during the Conquest of Wales by Edward I and compensation was paid by the king's commissioners. The roof and rood screen date from the 15th century. The church was restored by Henry Kennedy, Diocesan Architect to the See of Bangor, in 1852.

St Meugan's was replaced as the town's parish church by the more centrally located St Peter's Church. It remains an active parish church in the Diocese of St Asaph and occasional services are held.

== Architecture ==
In a tiny rural hamlet a mile or so from the town centre, St Meugan's was the original mother-church of the Welsh settlement which became Ruthin. The pretty little 15th-century building (dedicated to a hermit-saint from Caerleon) contains many notable furnishings – above all the ‘rood screen’ which once supported a ‘rood’ or crucifix (also at Derwen). The church probably dates back to the early 1500s and is a fine example of local carpentry: richly carved with intricate tracery, with an ‘ivy-berry’ trail (which is a Vale of Clwyd speciality) along its upper rail. The Georgian west gallery opposite (for choir and ‘church band’) is an even rarer survival, and is dated 1721, as such galleries were generally removed by the Victorians. Also rare is the ornate 17th-century altar table.

On the walls nearby are the intriguing monuments of the Thelwall family, who came to Ruthin with their de Grey overlords. The oldest depicts Elizabeth John and Jane Thelwall with their ten sons and four daughters, all named and some holding skulls to show that they died before their parents. The ninth son Ambrose is again commemorated by a fine portrait bust: a courtier to three Stuart kings, he retired here in the ‘troublesome times’ of Republican rule and died in 1653.

In the churchyard (not far from the south porch) stands the decorated nine-foot shaft of a medieval preaching cross: and in the north-east corner is the gravestone of ‘Alfred Corbett, Tramp’ a popular figure who died in 1947. A good guidebook is available in the church. St Meugan's church is open by appointment.

St Meugan's is a single-chamber church, the nave and chancel combined, with a south porch and a bellcote. The building materials are limestone and sandstone with a Welsh slate roof. The architectural historian Edward Hubbard, in his 2003 Clwyd volume of the Pevsner Buildings of Wales, notes the impressive collection of funerary monuments dating from the 16th to the 19th centuries. (Note: The exterior of the church has an 18th century sundial set into a wall. The names of the churchwardens "Dd Jones" and "Rb Rouland", are inscribed along with the construction date of 1736, and the brass gnomon is original.) The Royal Commission on the Ancient and Historical Monuments of Wales (RCAHMW) records the "fine" seven-bay collar truss roof

St Meugan's is a Grade I listed building. A shaft, all that remains of its 15th-century churchyard cross, is listed at Grade II*, and a monument in the churchyard is listed at Grade II.

== Gallery ==
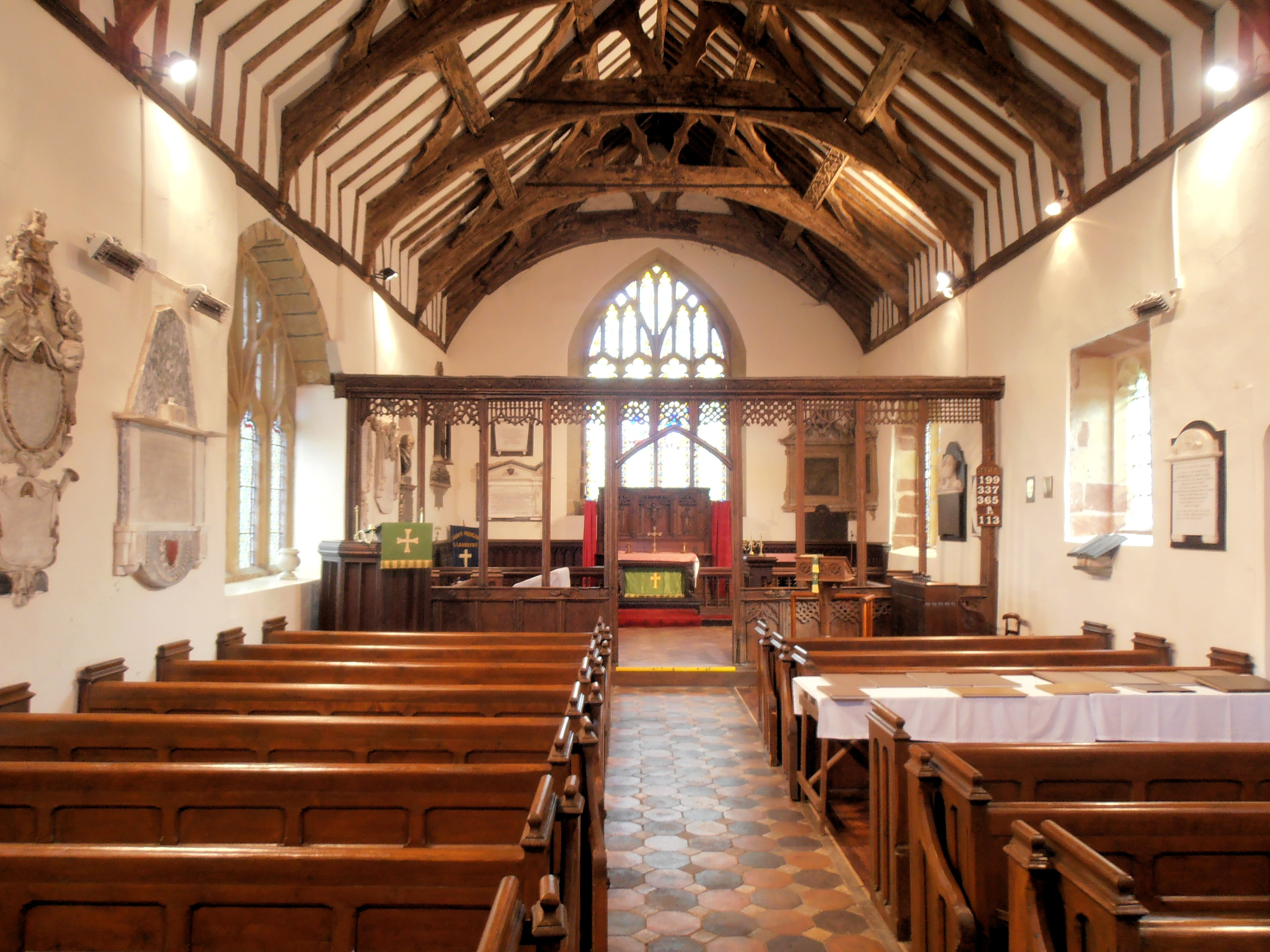
The interior

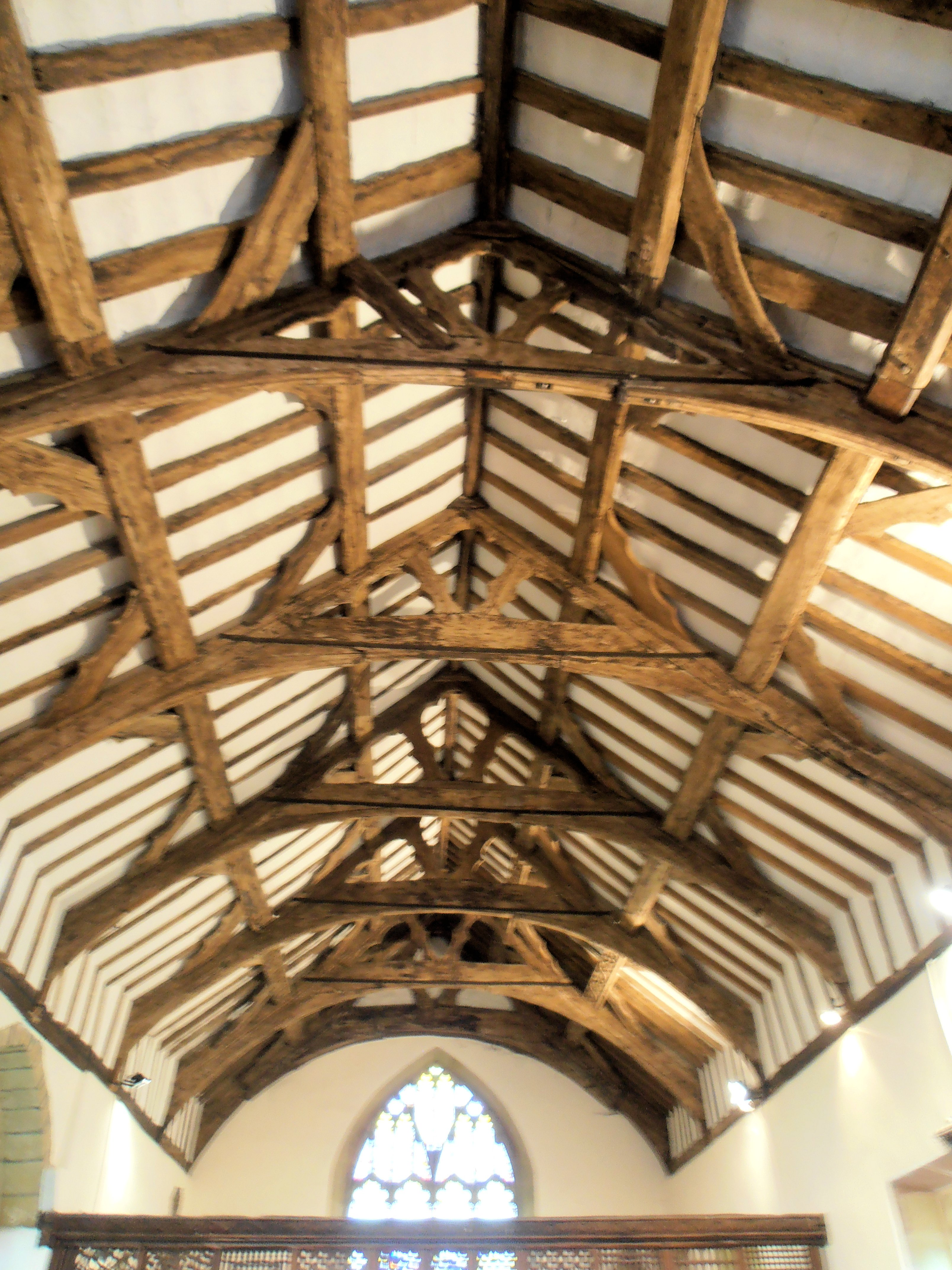
The "fine" collar truss roof

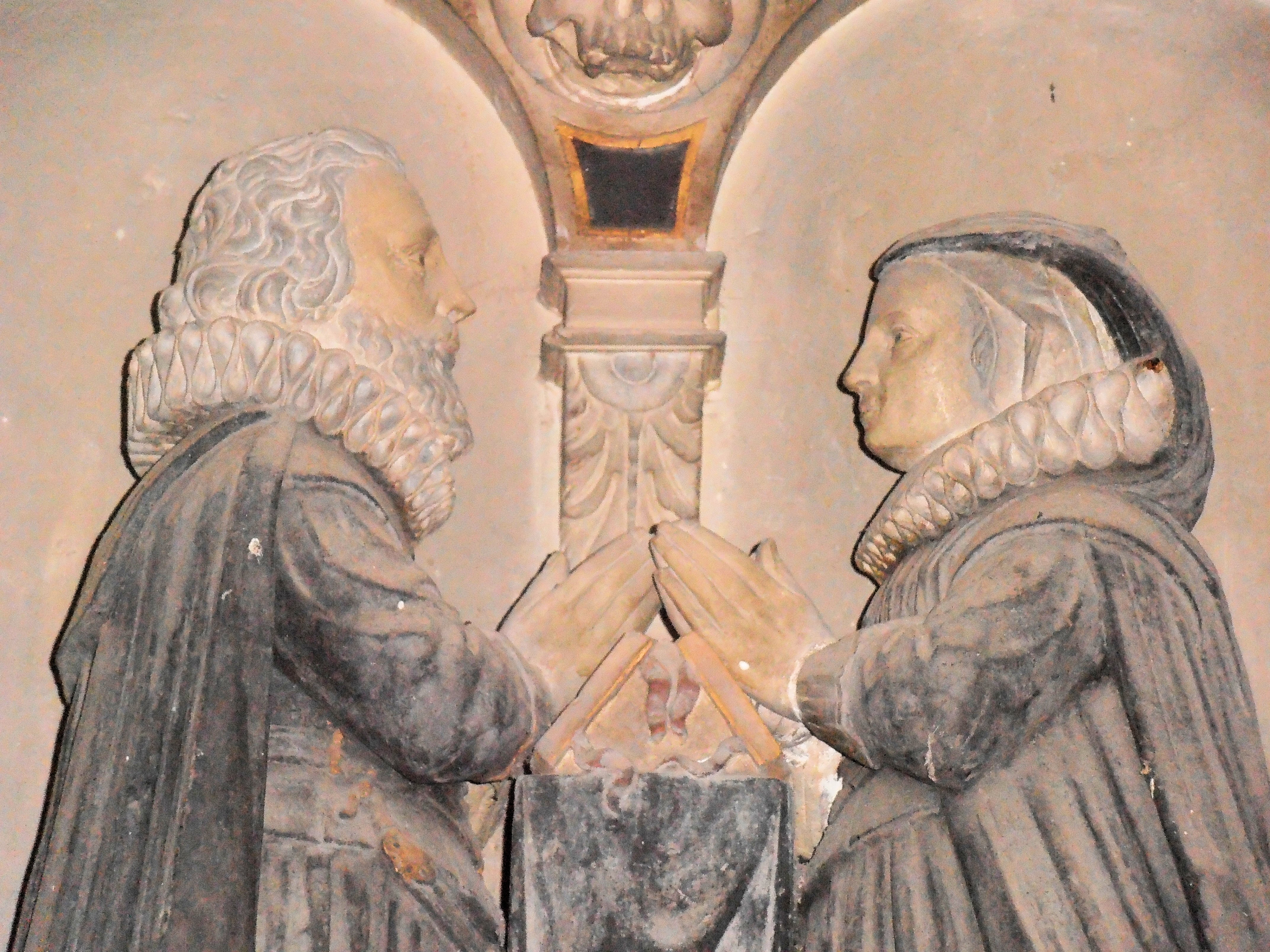
Monument in the church

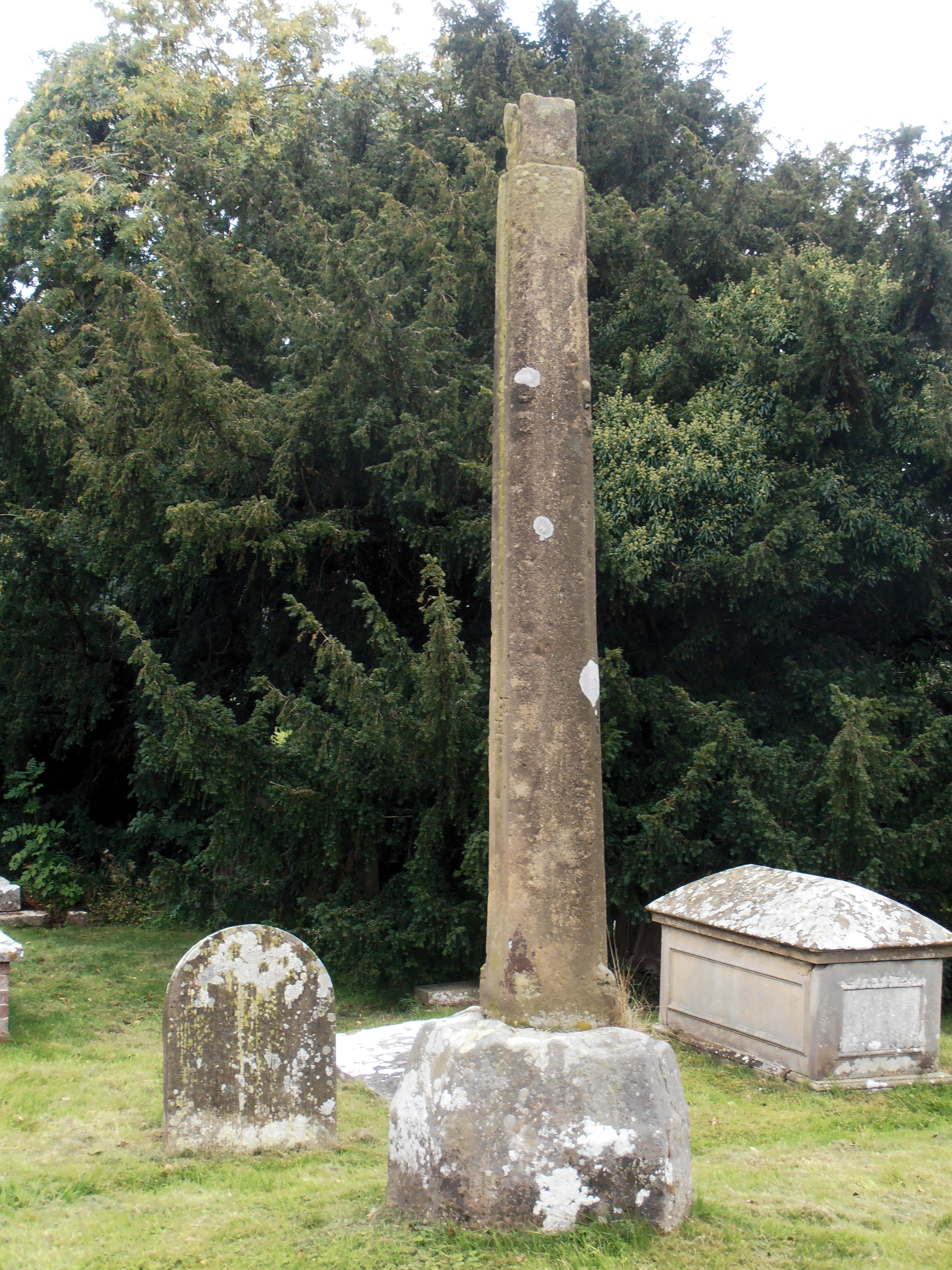
Shaft of the churchyard cross

== Sources ==
- Hubbard, Edward (2003). Clwyd (Denbighshire and Flintshire). The Buildings of Wales. New Haven and London: Yale University Press. ISBN 978-0-300-09627-9. OCLC 315792534.
