= List of Commissioners' churches in Wales =

A Commissioners' church is an Anglican church in the United Kingdom built with money voted by Parliament as a result of the Church Building Act 1818, and subsequent related Acts. Such churches have been given a number of titles, including "Commissioners' Churches", "Waterloo Churches" and "Million Act Churches". In some cases the Commissioners provided the full cost of the new church; in other cases they provided a grant and the balance was raised locally. This list contains the Commissioners' churches in Wales.

== Key ==
Grade	Criteria
I	Buildings of exceptional interest
II*	Particularly important buildings
II	Buildings special interest.
"—" denotes a work that is not graded.

== Churches ==
Name and location	Photograph	Date	Grant in £	Architect	Notes and refs.	Grade
St Matthew, Buckley, Flintshire; 53.1745°N 3.0726°W		1821–22	4,052	John Oates	Gothic Revival with a tower and spire. Rebuilt 1897–1902.	II*
St Michael, Llanbadarn Fawr, Aberystwyth, Ceredigion		1830–32	1,289	Edward Haycock	Gothic Revival with a bell turret. Replaced 1890.	—
St Thomas, Trevethin, Torfaen		1831–32	1,155	Edward Haycock	Gothic Revival with a bell turret.	
St David, Carmarthen, Carmarthenshire		1835–36	3,000	Edward Haycock	Gothic Revival with a tower.	II
St Paul, Newport		1835–36	1,350	Thomas Henry Wyatt	Gothic Revival with a tower and spire.	II
St George, Tredegar, Blaenau Gwent		1835–36	1,042	John Jenkins	Norman Revival with a tower.	II
St Mary, Bagillt, Flintshire		1837–39	300	John Lloyd	Gothic Revival style.	II
St Mary, Brymbo, Wrexham		1838	600	John Lloyd	Demolished about 1870.	—
St Mary, Glyntaff, Mid Glamorgan; 51.5966°N 3.3227°W		1838	414	Thomas Henry Wyatt	Norman Revival with a tower.	II
Holy Trinity, Gwernaffield, Flintshire		1838	300	John Lloyd	Replaced 1871–72.	—
St David, Denbigh, Denbighshire; 53.1839°N 3.4141°W		1838–40	250	Thomas Mainwaring Penson	Tower added 1855–58.	II
Christ Church, Cwmamman, Carmarthenshire		1841	400	Robert Ebbels	Gothic Revival with a tower.	II
Emmanuel, Bistre, Buckley, Flintshire; 53.1678°N 3.0882°W		1841–42	200	John Lloyd	Gothic Revival with a bell turret.	II
St Mary, Cardiff, South Wales		1841–43	1,663	Thomas Foster	Norman Revival with two west turrets.	II
St David, Newtown, Powys		1843–45	2,000	Thomas Mainwaring Penson	Gothic Revival with a tower.	II
St John, Clydach, Swansea, West Glamorgan; 51.6951°N 3.8971°W		1845–47	200	William Whittington	Gothic Revival with a northwest tower and turrets.	II
St John the Baptist, Pontfadog, Wrexham; 52.9329°N 3.1438°W		1845–47	100	F. Wehnert	Gothic Revival with a tower.	
St David, Merthyr Tydfil, Mid Glamorgan		1846–47	1,204	Thomas Henry Wyatt and David Brandon	Gothic Revival with a bell turret.	II
St John, Pembroke Dock, Pembrokeshire		1846–48	400	James Harrison	Gothic Revival with a tower.	II
St Paul, Llanelli, Carmarthenshire		1849–50	250	George Gilbert Scott	Gothic Revival style.	
Skewen, West Glamorgan		1849–50	125	Egbert Moxham	Gothic Revival style.	
Holy Trinity, Gwersyllt, Wrexham; 53.0747°N 3.0221°W		1850–51	150	Thomas Mainwaring Penson	Gothic Revival with a steeple.	
St Michael, Brynford, Flintshire; 53.2605°N 3.2330°W		1851–52	125	Thomas Henry Wyatt	Gothic Revival with a bell turret.	II
Holy Trinity, Pillgwenlly, Newport		1851–52	250	John Langdon	Gothic Revival style.	
St Fagan, Trecynon, Mid Glamorgan		1851–53	200	Thomas Talbot Bury	Gothic Revival with a bell gable. Burnt down 1855.	—
St Elvan, Aberdare, Mid Glamorgan; 51.7132°N 3.4452°W		1852–53	250	Andrew Moseley	Gothic Revival with a spire.	II*
St David, Maesteg, Mid Glamorgan		1852–53	100	Egbert Moxham	Gothic Revival with a bell turret.	
St John the Evangelist, Rhosllannerchrugog, Wrexham		1852–53	200	Thomas Mainwaring Penson	Norman Revival with a bell turret.	II
Holy Trinity, Nantyglo, Blaenau Gwent		1852–54	100	Joshua Daniels	Gothic Revival with a bell turret.	
St David, Rhondda, Mid Glamorgan		c. 1853	60	Charles Bernard		
St Michael, Abertillery, Blaenau Gwent		1853–54	125	John Norton	Replaced 1898.	—
St Seiriol, Holyhead, Anglesey		1854	185	Charles Verelst	Gothic Revival with a spire. Demolished in 1992 after the structure became unsafe.	—
Christ Church, Glanogwen, Llanllechid, Gwynedd		1855–56	300	Thomas Henry Wyatt	Gothic Revival with a steeple.	
St Peter, Swansea		1856	85	Richard Penson	Gothic Revival with a bell turret.	

== See also ==
- List of Commissioners' churches in eastern England
- List of Commissioners' churches in the English Midlands
- List of Commissioners' churches in London
- List of Commissioners' churches in Northeast and Northwest England
- List of Commissioners' churches in southwest England
- List of Commissioners' churches in Yorkshire
