= Bob Griffiths (priest) =

Church in Wales priest

The Ven. Robert Herbert Griffiths

Archdeacon of Wrexham
- Incumbent
- Assumed office 2014

Personal details
- Born: 1953 (age 72–73) Rhyl
- Education: Chichester Theological College

Robert Herbert (Bob) Griffiths (born 1953) is a Church in Wales priest: he has been Archdeacon of Wrexham since 2014.

He was born in Rhyl. He studied for ordination at Chichester Theological College. After a curacy in Holywell he was a Chaplain to the Forces from 1979 until 1987. After this he served at Llanfair Dyffryn Clwyd, St Asaph and Llanrhos.
