= St Mary's Church, Glyntaff =

St Mary's Church
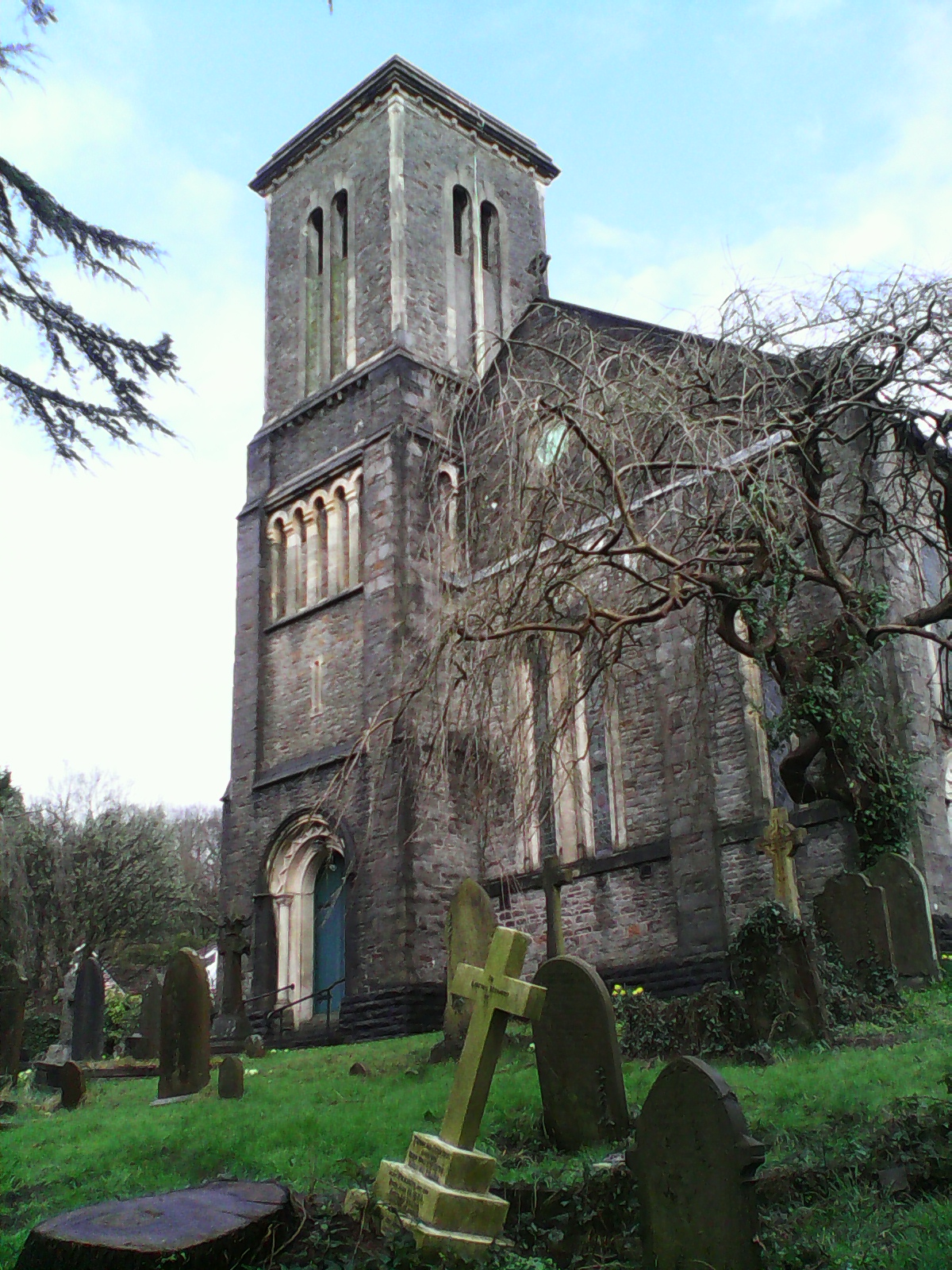
- The church in 2017.
- St Mary's Church
- 51.5965°N 3.3224°W
- Denomination: Church in Wales
- Churchmanship: Anglo-Catholic

History
- Status: Active
- Dedication: Saint Mary
- Consecrated: 29 October 1839

Architecture
- Functional status: Parish church
- Heritage designation: Grade II
- Designated: 26 February 2001
- Architect: Thomas Henry Wyatt
- Style: Romanesque Revival
- Groundbreaking: 1837
- Completed: 1839
- Construction cost: £2500

Specifications
- Capacity: 800

Administration
- Diocese: Llandaff
- Deanery: Pontypridd
- Parish: Pontypridd

St Mary's Church is a Church in Wales parish church in the village of Glyntaff, near Pontypridd, South Wales. It is the oldest Anglican church in the Pontypridd urban area. Formerly an independent parish, it became part of the Parish of Glyntaff, Rhydyfelin and The Graig, and is now part of the Parish of Pontypridd. It is a member of Pontypridd Christians Together.

The church has a long tradition of following an Anglo-Catholic style of worship, extending at least as far back as the 1920s.

== History ==
The church was built by the architect Thomas Henry Wyatt of London. He employed architectural practices that were later used in his work on St Mary and St Nicholas parish church in Wilton, Wiltshire. The Ecclesiastical Commissioners gave a grant of £414. The rest of the cost was borne by local worthies, including a £400 by the Hon. R. H. Clive and J. Bruce Pryce. Worship commenced in the church on 22 April 1838, an event reported by the Glamorgan, Monmouth & Brecon Gazette and Merthyr Guardian on 28 April. The first vicar of St Mary's was John Griffiths, who presided at the church between 1848 and 1875. When the church originally opened, it had an austere and minimally furnished interior, intended to accommodate as many worshippers as possible at the expense of comfort, this being a common feature of Commissioners' churches at the time. A refurbishment in 1906 saw the interior updated and the quality of the seating improved. An oak screen was inserted to create a chancel. At the same time oak block flooring, an oak pulpit, a reredos and oak pews were installed. The tower originally had a pyramidal cap, but this was destroyed by a violent storm on 27 October 1913 and has never been replaced. The storm also caused extensive damage to the church's vicarage. A new vestry was added in 1922. The church has a memorial to the First World War, located in the porch. The church became Grade II listed in 2001.

The screen and pews were removed in late 2022 as part of the reordering of the church for its use by Citizen Church, Cardiff.

The churchyard contains the grave of Gordon Lenox, who was a benefactor of the church, and a member of the family who were owners of the local chainworks Brown Lenox & Co Ltd.

== Location ==
The church is located near the A470 main road. The nearest railway station is at Treforest.

== See also ==
- List of Commissioners' churches in Wales
