= Glyntaff =

Coordinates: 51.596°N 3.323°W

Glyntaff: Welsh: Glyn-taf
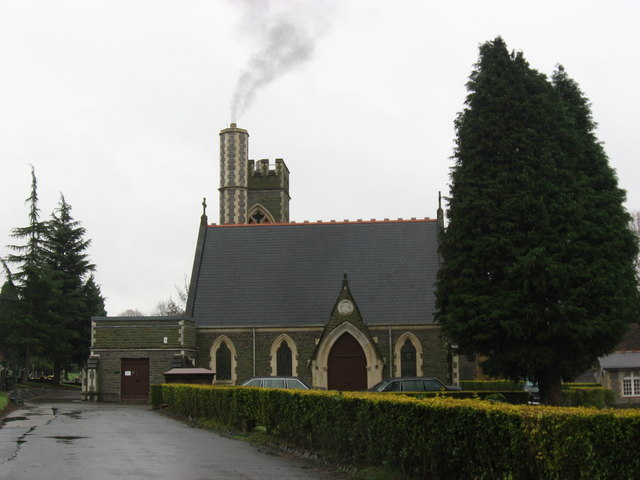

- Location within Rhondda Cynon Taf
- Principal area: Rhondda Cynon Taf
- Preserved county: Mid Glamorgan
- Country: Wales
- Sovereign state: United Kingdom
- Police: South Wales
- Fire: South Wales
- Ambulance: Welsh
- UK Parliament: Pontypridd
- Senedd Cymru – Welsh Parliament: Rhondda

Glyntaff (Welsh: Glyn-taf) is a small village to the south-east of Pontypridd, in the County Borough of Rhondda Cynon Taf, Wales situated in the Treforest ward along with the village of Trefforest.

== Education ==
Glyntaff is the location of the University of South Wales, formerly University of Glamorgan, Polytechnic of Wales' Glyntaff Campus, which houses the Department for Health, Sport and Social Science (HESAS); including Glamorgan's Police Science Centre and Glamorgan Centre for Art & Design Technology.

== Places of worship ==
The parish church of St Mary's is on Glyntaff Road in the village.

== Other information ==
Also Glyntaff Crematorium (pictured), the first such facility in Wales when opened in 1924, is located in this village. It is run by Rhondda Cynon Taf County Borough Council.

Glyntaff was served between 1904 and 1932 by Glyntaff Halt railway station on the Pontypridd, Caerphilly and Newport Railway.
