= St Berres' Church, Llanferres =

Coordinates: 53.1360°N 3.2144°W

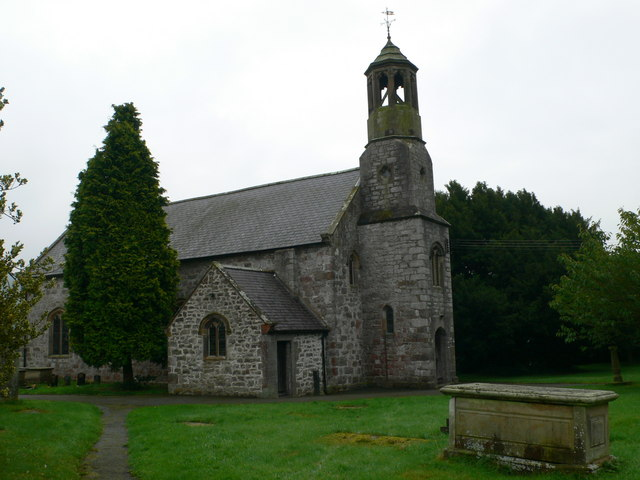
- St Berres' Church, Llanferres, from the northwest
- St Berres' Church, Llanferres
- OS grid reference: SJ 188 605
- Location: Llanferres, Denbighshire
- Country: Wales
- Denomination: Anglican

History
- Dedication: Saint Berres

Architecture
- Heritage designation: Grade II
- Designated: 26 April 1990
- Architect(s): Joseph Turner (?), Thomas Jones, John Douglas
- Architectural type: Church
- Style: Gothic

Specifications
- Materials: Limestone, slate roofs

Administration
- Province: Church in Wales
- Diocese: St Asaph
- Archdeaconry: Wrexham
- Deanery: Mold
- Parish: Mold Mission Area

Clergy
- Rector: Fr. Daniel J. S. Stroud

St Berres' Church, Llanferres, is in the village of Llanferres, Denbighshire, Wales on the A494 road between Mold and Ruthin. It is an Anglican church in the Bro Famau Group of Churches, the Mission Area of Mold, the archdeaconry of Wrexham and the diocese of St Asaph. The church is designated by Cadw as a Grade II listed building.

== History ==
The earliest documentary evidence to the church is in 1291, although it is possible that it has a medieval origin. Alterations were made to the church in the 17th century, which are indicated by a datestone of 1650. Some rebuilding took place in 1774, probably under the direction of the Chester architect Joseph Turner. Another Chester architect, Thomas Jones, added the south transept, the west tower, and possibly two galleries. A third Chester architect, John Douglas carried out an internal restoration in 1891–92. This included stripping of the plaster, removal of the galleries, and a new screen. Glass was removed from the east window and inserted into windows at the west end.

== Architecture ==
=== Exterior ===
The church is built in limestone with slate roofs and grey ridge tiles. Its plan consists of a nave and chancel in one cell, a south transept, a west tower, and a porch near the northwest angle of the nave. The tower has three stages. In the lowest stage, on the west wall is a doorway, and above this is a two-light window. The second stage has a quatrefoil window on each face. The top stage consists of an octagonal bellcote with a weathervane.

=== Interior ===
The font has a bowl with quatrefoils and is dated 1684. There are two sepulchral slabs which date from the late 13th century. One of the monuments dates from the late 14th century, and others from the 17th and 18th centuries.

== External features ==
The gate piers in the church yard are also designated as a Grade II listed building. The churchyard contains the war graves of a Welsh Guards soldier and an airman of World War II.

== See also ==
- List of church restorations, amendments and furniture by John Douglas
