= Holy Trinity Church, Penrhos =

Coordinates: 52.7412°N 3.1307°W

Holy Trinity Church
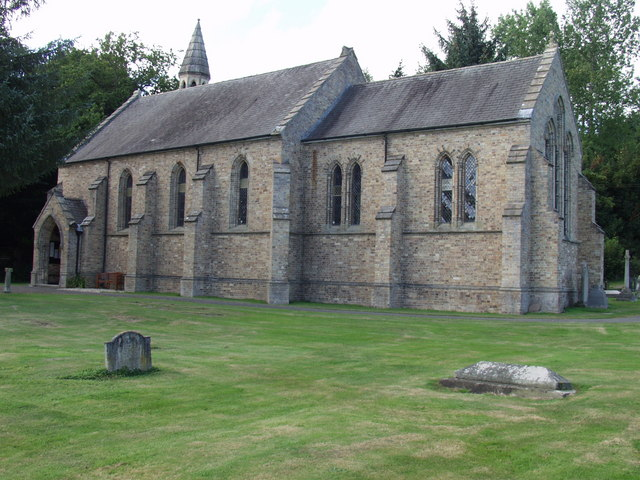
- Holy Trinity Church
- Country: Wales
- Denomination: Church in Wales

Architecture
- Heritage designation: Grade II
- Designated: 29 December 1994
- Architectural type: Church
- Style: Medieval

Holy Trinity Church is a church in the valley of Penrhos, Powys, Wales. The present church was built in 1845 to a design by Sydney Smirke, as a replacement for a previous church which was built in 1627. It was designated a Grade II-listed building on 29 December 1994.
