= St Mary's Church, Betws Gwerful Goch =

Coordinates: 53.0079°N 3.4436°W

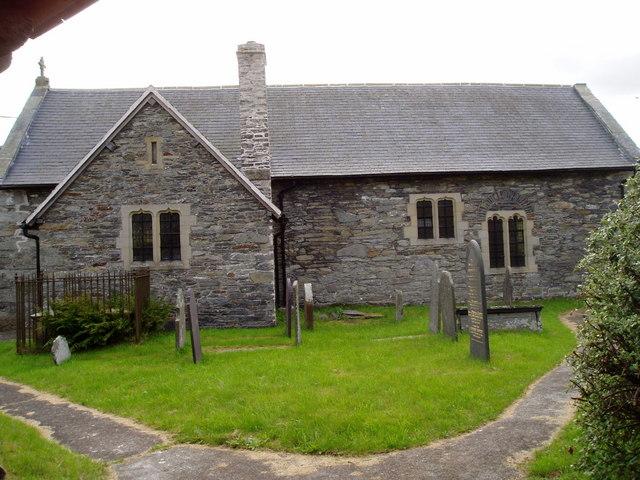
- St Mary's Church, Betws Gwerful Goch, from the north
- St Mary's Church, Betws Gwerful Goch
- OS grid reference: SJ 032 465
- Location: Betws Gwerful Goch, Denbighshire
- Country: Wales
- Denomination: Anglican

History
- Founded: 12th century
- Dedication: St Mary

Architecture
- Heritage designation: Grade II*
- Designated: 20 October 1966
- Architect: John Douglas (restoration)
- Architectural type: Church

Specifications
- Materials: Shale with slate roofs and stone ridge tiles

Administration
- Province: Church in Wales
- Diocese: St Asaph
- Archdeaconry: Wrexham
- Deanery: Penllyn & Edeyrnion

Clergy
- Vicar: Revd S. J. Roberts

St Mary's Church, Betws Gwerful Goch, is in the village of Betws Gwerful Goch, Denbighshire, Wales. It is an active Anglican church in the deanery of Penllyn & Edeyrnion, the archdeaconry of Wrexham and the diocese of St Asaph. The church is designated by Cadw as a Grade II* listed building.

== History ==
The building dates probably from the 12th century although there may have been an earlier church on the site dedicated to Saint Elain. It was restored by the Chester architect John Douglas in 1881–82. In the process of this restoration, the north door was removed, a vestry with a chimney was added, and the box pews were taken out. The plaster was removed from the walls, windows were replaced, a buttress was added to the south side, a new screen was erected. A new bellcote with a spire, and the lychgate were added. In 1985 the bellcote had to be removed.

== Architecture ==
The church is built in shale. The roofs are covered in slates, with stone ridge tiles. Its plan consists of a nave and a chancel, with a south porch and a vestry to the north of the chancel. At the east end is a stone cross finial. The east window is part of Douglas' restoration; it consists of three lights with ogee heads.

== See also ==
- List of church restorations, amendments and furniture by John Douglas
