= St Peter's Church, Ruthin =

Church in Denbighshire, Wales

Coordinates: 53.1154°N 3.3108°W

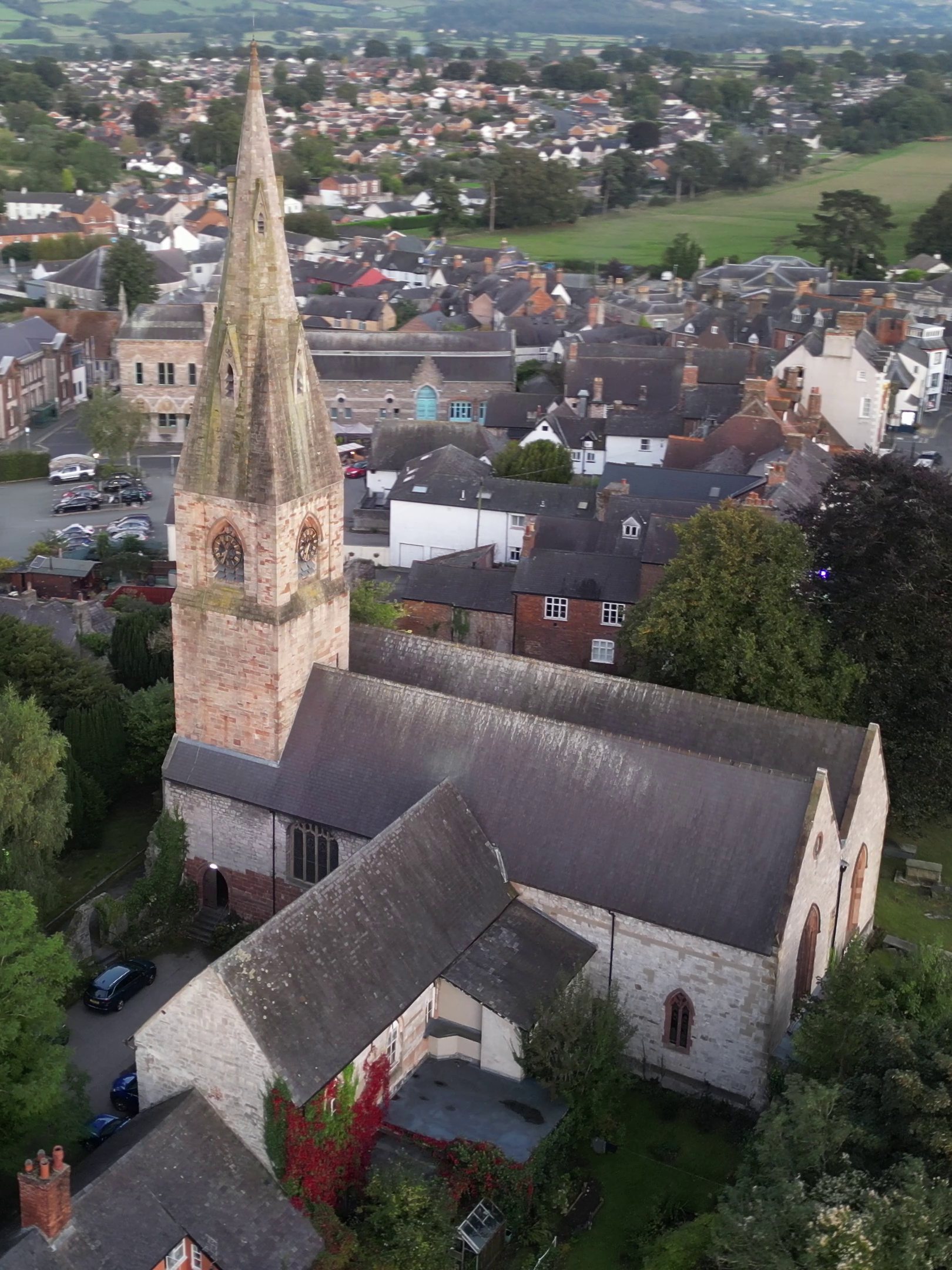
St Peter's Church

The Collegiate and Parochial Church of St Peter is the Anglican parish church of Ruthin, an ancient market town which lies within the Vale of Clwyd in Denbighshire, north east Wales. It is a greater church of the diocese of St Asaph and a Grade I listed building.

== History ==
=== St Peter's Church ===
The embryo of Christianity developed in the Vale of Clwyd before the 10th century, when numerous Celtic saints established religious cells throughout the vale. One, named Meugan, founded a cell within the parish of Llanrhydd, which served the surrounding population, including that of Ruthin. It flowered to become the mother church of the area. It is evident that St. Meugan's grew in prominence, as the church is recorded in the Norwich Taxatio of 1254 and suffered damage during the Edwardian wars for which compensation was paid by the Crown to the church authorities. The present building is located some 1.5 miles south-east of Ruthin.

In 1282, when Edward I completed his conquest of Wales, it was the first phase in the reduction of the dominance of St. Meugan's as the mother church. For his services to the crown, Edward granted the Cantref of Dyffryn Clwyd to his close friend Reginald de Grey, baron of Wilton. De Grey proceeded to complete the construction of Ruthin Castle, which had been commenced in 1277 by royal masons, and in 1282 created Ruthin a chartered borough.

With the death of Reginald de Grey in 1308, the lordship of Ruthin passed to his son John, an important person in the history of St. Peter's.

In 1310 he established a place or worship – Capella St. Petri – for the inhabitants of the new borough. He established a collegiate church, which is a church staffed by a community (Latin collegium) of priests, in this case seven. These were known as the Bonshommes, in fact an order of priests, associated with the Augustinian canons, the Rule of which they followed. The 'order' had only three houses in England and Wales, Ruthin being the only one in Wales.

During the turbulent years of the fifteenth century, the collegiate church continued to serve the community, but it suffered damage during the Owain Glyndŵr uprising, when the town of Ruthin was raided on 16 September 1400 and again in 1402, when the 3rd Lord de Grey was captured and ransomed by Glyndŵr.

In the year 1508 the 6th Lord de Grey of Ruthin, 3rd Earl of Kent, sold the lordship to King Henry VII. The de Greys were impoverished due in the main to the high ransom the family had to pay for the release of the 3rd Lord in 1402.

The original church has been much altered since then, particularly by a Victorian restoration in 1854–59, when its trademark spire – the only spire in the Vale of Clwyd – was also added. Within, the most immediately striking feature of St Peter's is that it is double-naved, consisting of two rectangles of equal length, built side by side and divided by a row of pillars.

This arrangement resulted when the originally "single rectangle" church was laterally doubled in size in the late 14th century. Uncommon elsewhere in Britain, the double-naved form was much favoured in the Vale of Clwyd, becoming a distinctive local style. There are now no less than 21 such double-naved churches in the district.

Both naves have magnificent timber roofs, added in the early Tudor period (c. 1500–40). The northern nave roof is particularly elaborate, with decorated beams and over 400 panels carved with an immense variety of devices, flowers, badges and heraldry of baronial families. The later, southern roof is simpler, with plain panels but decorated bosses (and a recently painted section near the altar).

In 1589–90 Dean Gabriel Goodman purchased the church and college lands and refounded the wardenship in connection with Christ's Hospital, overseeing the construction of almshouses for twelve persons, including two women. The dean had earlier, in 1574, refounded Ruthin School. He had thus become the major benefactor of the town, making Ruthin a centre of ecclesiastical importance and the premier educational establishment in North Wales.

In the year 1683 the great bell of Ruthin Church was cast at the joint expense of Sir Thomas Myddleton and Sir John Salusbury. Thus, the tower at this time must have been structurally sound enough to hold at least one large bell. A smaller bell had been also used since the Middle Ages to ring the night curfew to the inhabitants of the town.

Since the demolition of the original chancel in 1663, little maintenance appears to have been undertaken to the church, as in the year 1714 a royal brief was issued to carry out urgent repairs, to the estimated value of some £3,128. The church must have remained in a decayed condition, as during 1720/1, restoration to the stone structure, windows, timber – including a new family pew – and ironwork was undertaken at the expense of the Myddletons of Chirk Castle, who were then Lords of the Manor of Ruthin.

It appears that the work required by the brief of 1714 was not completed, as in 1754 a further brief was issued, noting that the church had "... become so ruinous and dangerous to the lives of the inhabitants". This George II brief is now included in the British Museum collections.

In 1720 the Myddletons paid £28 18s 1d to the Davies brothers of Bersham, who constructed the fine wrought-iron gates of the churchyard, and in 1727 a further £20 was subscribed for their erection. The Davies Bros. also made the gates of Chirk Castle and Wrexham Parish Church. The erection of the gates enhanced the setting of the church and provided Ruthin with excellent examples of the ironsmith's craft.

In 1804 the Rev. Richard Newcome was appointed warden. During his 47 years in Ruthin he was to undertake alterations of the church, the town and the castle of Ruthin and to become the biographer of Gabriel Goodman. He was also a friend of the "Ladies of Llangollen", to whom he presented a carved lion which is still to be seen at Plas Newydd.

A disastrous fire occurred on 6 April 1904, when damage was done to the vestry and the roof of the inner vestry, causing the loss of an ancient brass alms dish, prayer books and a cupboard full of clerical robes.

On 31 March 1920, by reason of the Welsh Church Act 1914, the whole of Wales and Monmouthshire was severed from the Church of England and the domination of Canterbury to become the Church in Wales with its own archbishop.

In 1949 the electric clock cost £896 and was installed on the tower section of the spire as a memorial to the fallen of World War Two.

During a special service held on 16 May 1976, the local branch of the British Legion laid up its standard in the church for safekeeping. Also, the standard of the Royal Air Forces Association was placed in the church "for evermore", at a service held on 29 September 1991.

Among the many memorials are two monumental brasses – very rare in Wales – on the north nave wall. The single figure depicts Edward Goodman, a cloth merchant who died in 1560, in his robes as mayor of Ruthin. Unusually, he appears again on a second brass with his wife (he lived to be 84, she 90) and their eight named children. Their second son was Gabriel Goodman, who is again commemorated by a strikingly painted bust near the altar. He was a most distinguished cleric, chaplain to Queen Elizabeth’s "prime minister" William Cecil and dean of Westminster. Goodman also helped finance the Welsh translation of the Bible

Behind the church is a collection of historical buildings relating to the church and Gabriel Goodman.

=== Church close ===
Located behind St Peter's Church this attractive group of buildings give the feeling of a small cathedral close.

- The Almshouses:

The fifty statutes for the governance of Christ's Hospital were drafted and signed by the founder, Dean Gabriel Goodman, Dean of Westminster on 28 June 1590, a copy of which is in the keeping of the Warden. The statutes state-"That there shall be a president, being bishop of the diocese; one warden who shall be a preacher, and 12 poor, whereof 10 shall be men and two women". The men were to be "... of 50 years of aged alive, and the two women, widows or maids likewise of 50 years at the least; and men and women to be sole and unmarried at the time of their admittance, and so remain suring their lives, upon pain of losing their places in the said hospital". The two women were to wash for, and to look to, the sick and impotent poor of the hospital. The poor were once known as the "Goodman Pensioners".

For the poor, a group of twelve almshouses were built and the Warden resided in the Old Cloisters. In 1863 a new scheme and regulations for the management of Christ's Hospital was prepared by the Charity Commissioners. At that time the almshouses were ordered to be reconstructed, but this was not done until 1865.

The property has been substantially refurbished in 1865 and 1974 now offering comfortable living conditions in one bedroom accommodation with the rules considerably relaxed with married couples now living in the accommodation

The Warden was the guardian of the hospital and parish priest in St Peter's Church. He also had to provide a stock of three or four cows, milk them himself dividing the milk amongst the inmates. The inmates had to rise at 6.a.m (7 a.m. in winter) and retire at 9p.m.(8p.m. in winter) They were not to frequent alehouses, nor beg from door to door nor take in lodgers, and damages to hospital property were to be paid for out of their allowance

The two women were to wash for, and to look after the sick and impotent poor of the hospital.

- The Old Cloisters:

Forms part of the original collegiate part of the church founded in 1310. It is a two-storey building attached to St. Peter's which was the dwelling and workrooms of the priests who served the church before the Reformation. After the purchase of the college lands by Dean Goodman in 1589/90 it became the residence of the Wardens of Ruthin until the erection of the new Cloisters in 1954.

The various alterations and additions which were undertaken to the building over the years can be noted on the elevations. The neat brick addition at the north end was added during the early 16th century and is now the residence of the Choirmaster. The first floor of the Old Cloisters has been converted into a Masonic Temple which is let to the Gabriel Goodman Lodge of Freemasons. The ground floor is used as a Parish room, music rooms for the church choir.

Source. The Collegiate and Parochial Church of St Peter

- The Old Grammar School and Headmaster's House:

The existing stone building was erected by subscription in 1700 on the site of the original school room.

The brick building adjacent to the Grammar School was built in 1742 as dormitories and a house for the Headmaster. The Old Grammar School and Headmaster's house were sold in 1903 and 1994 and have since been converted into flats.

== Gates ==
Churchyard Gates
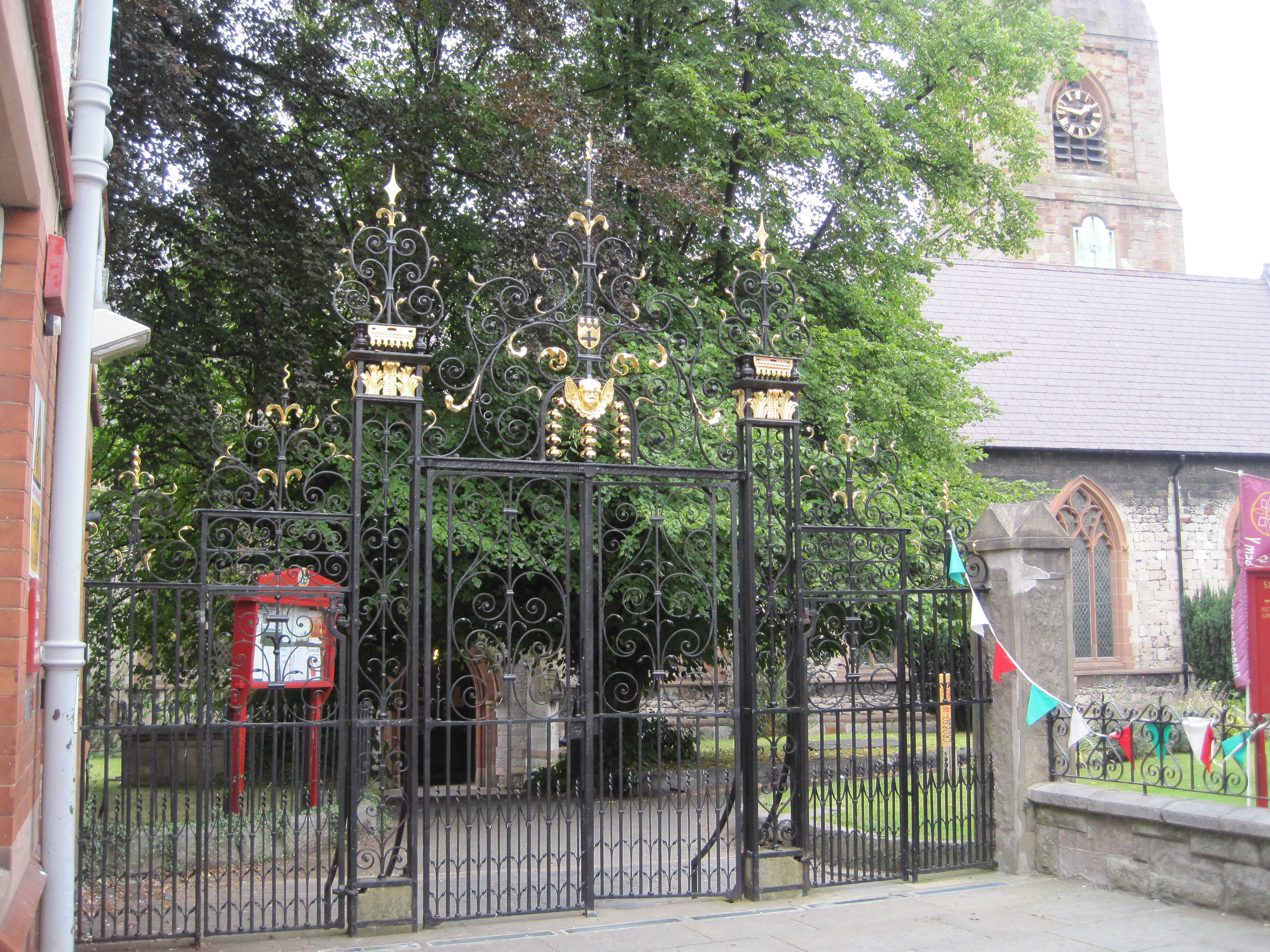
- Interactive map of the Churchyard Gates area

General information
- Status: Completed
- Location: Churchyard, Ruthin, Denbighshire, Ruthin, Wales

Website
- Cadw

References
- Cadw 906

These wrought iron gates are Grade II listed, made on 24 October 1950 (Cadw listing: 906) and are located on the north side of St Peter's Square, to the rear of the Post-office, forming the main entrance to the church. Made in 1727 by Robert Davies of Bersham, a gift of the Myddeltons of Chirk Castle to the church.

== Wardens or Priors of the Old Foundation ==
- 1310 Sir Hugh (Rector of Llanrhydd)
- 1353 Nicholas de Blechley
- 1391 Gethin
- 14—David ap Ieuan ap Iorwerth
- 1416 William Sutton
- 1421 John Croote
- 1439 Nicholas Hammond
- 1455 Robert Hale
- 1465 John Bert
- 1511 David Yale
- 1512 John Greysley
- 1535 John Strynger (Resigned)
- 1535 David Yale
- 1541 Hugh ap Ieuan

== Wardens of the New Foundation ==
- 1590 Eubule Thelwall
- 1594 John Price
- 1599 Jaspar Griffith
- 1606 John Williams
- 1621 John Bayley
- 1633 David Lloyd (Ejected 1642)
- 1658 Robert Lloyd
- 1662 David Lloyd (Restored)
- 1668 Hugh Pugh
- 1682 John Lloyd
- 1713 Benjamin Conway
- 1748 Edward Jones
- 1784 William Parry
- 1804 Richard Newcome
- 1851 Bulkeley Owen Jones
- 1909 Lewis Pryce
- 1916 Arthur Llewelyn Davies
- 1923 John Howell Thomas
- 1933 John Evan Rowland
- 1951 James Cecil Jones
- 1966 Gwilym T. Hugues
- 1970 John Elwern Thomas
- 1979 Robert Edward Smart
- 1986 David John Williams
- 1996 Raymond Bayley
- 2010 Stuart Evans
- 2023 Luke Bristowe
