= Old St Peter's Church, Llanbedr Dyffryn Clwyd =

Ruins in Denbighshire, Wales

Old St. Peter's Church
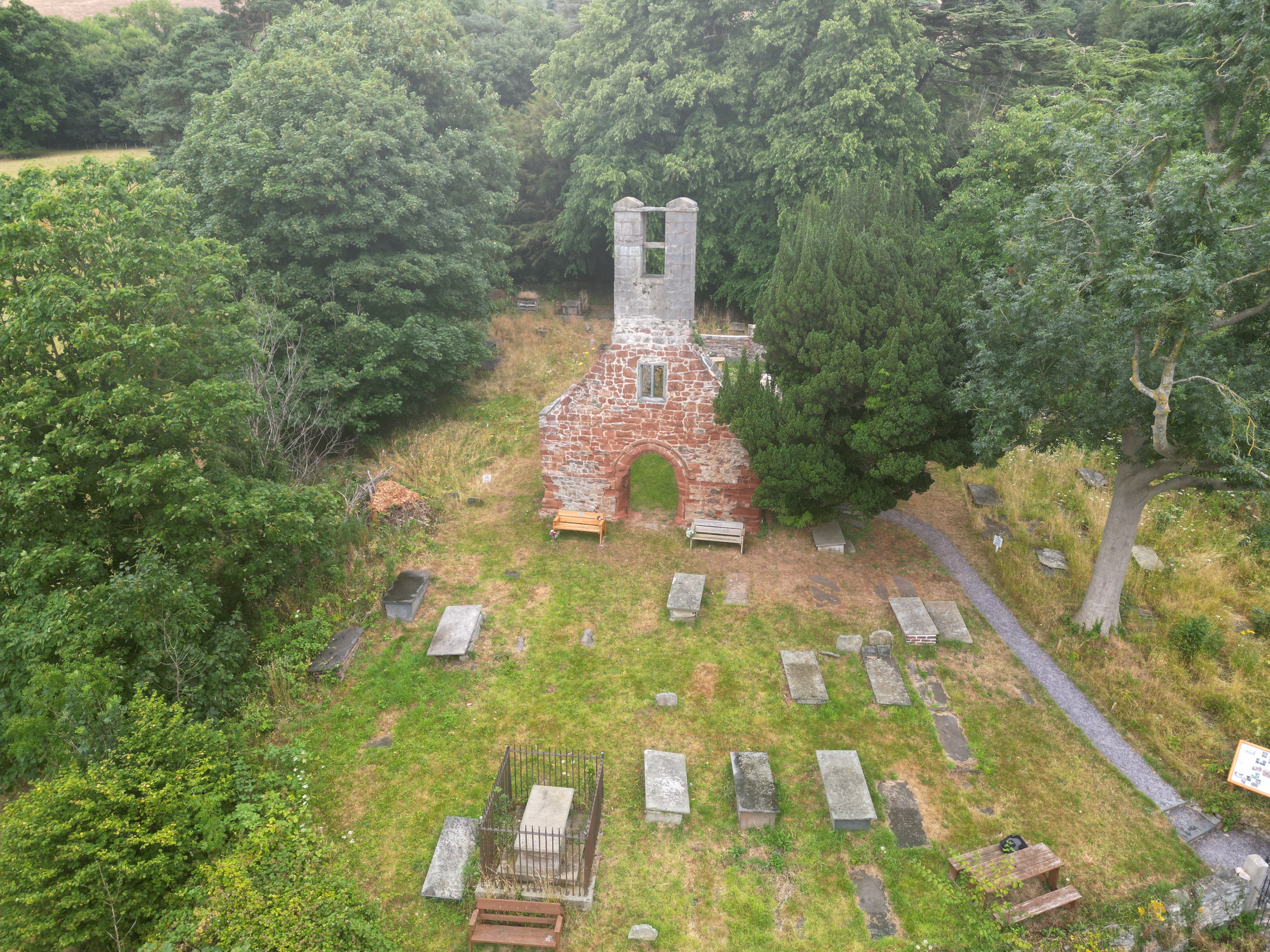
- Aerial photograph of Old St Peter's Church

Religion
- Region: North Wales
- Rite: Christian

Location
- Location: Llanbedr Dyffryn Clwyd, Denbighshire
- Interactive map of Old St. Peter's Church
- Coordinates: 53.128535°N 3.276021°W

Architecture
- Completed: 1291

Old St Peter's Church a Grade II-listed ruin is situated above the B5429 in the village of Llanbedr Dyffryn Clwyd. It was first mentioned in the Lincoln Taxatio of 1291. Valued at £418 in the Valor Ecclesiasticus of 1535.
