= St Elidan's Church, Llanelidan =

Church in Denbighshire, Wales

Coordinates: 53.0447°N 3.3292°W

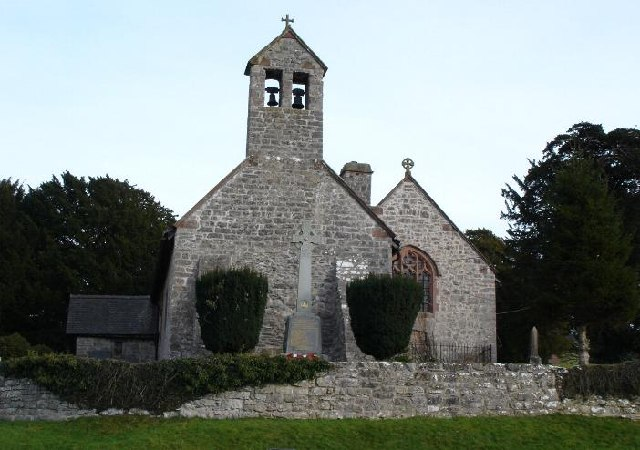
St Elidan's Church

St Elidan's Church is a Grade II*-listed building in the community of Llanelidan in Denbighshire, Wales.
