= Sadwrn =

Two Welsh saints bear the name Sadwrn (Welsh pronunciation: [ˈsadʊrn]): St Sadwrn of Llansadwrn near Beaumaris in Anglesey, and St Sadwrn of Henllan in Denbighshire.

== St Sadwrn of Llansadwrn ==
A burial stone dating from AD 550 at the latest, discovered in 1742, suggests that St Sadwrn of Llansadwrn may also have been known as Sadyrnin (Saturninus), creating a link to two churches in Carmarthenshire in south Wales: Llansadwrn, a chapel under Cynwyl Gaeo and Llansadyrnin, both of which were dedicated to Sadwrn and had fairs on 5 October.

== St Sadwrn of Henllan ==
This Sadwrn is mentioned in the Life of Saint Winefrid (Welsh: Gwenfrewy) by Robert of Shrewsbury and also in the Welsh hagiography Buchedd Gwenfrewy. According to these, Winifred was sent to Sadwrn at Henllan in Rhufoniog by Deifer of Bodfari. However, Sadwrn evidently did not want to be troubled with her and sent her on to Prince Eleri at Gwytherin.

The festival at Henllan is held on 29 November, but as this is also the feast day of Saturnin, martyr bishop of Toulouse, it may have been adopted only in mediaeval times.
