= Llanrhydd =

Hamlet in Denbighshire, Wales

Coordinates: 53.110°N 3.286°W

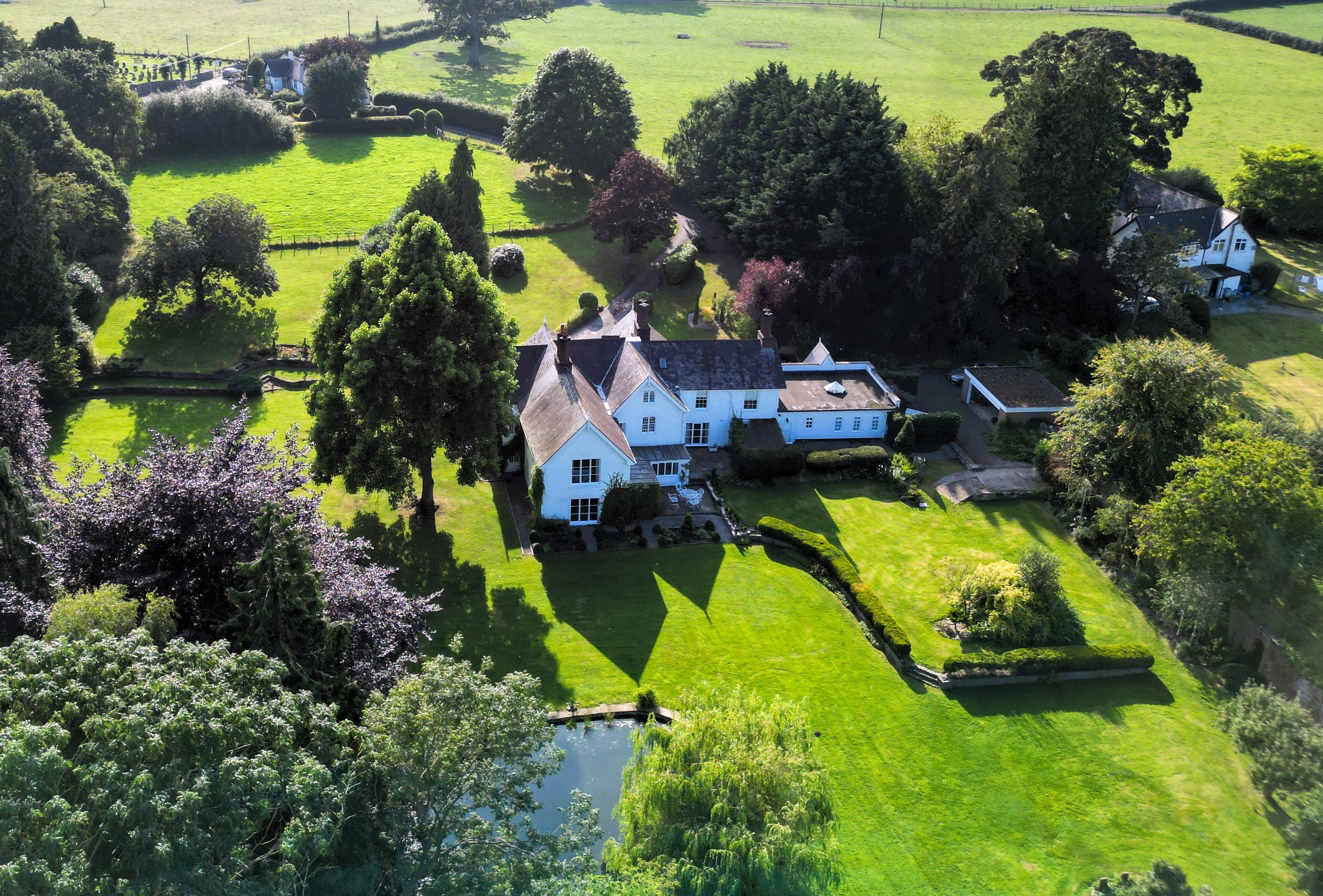
- Aerial view of Llanrhydd Hall

- Location within Denbighshire
- OS grid reference: SJ 14 57
- Community: Llanbedr Dyffryn Clwyd
- Principal area: Denbighshire
- Country: Wales
- Sovereign state: United Kingdom
- Post town: Ruthin
- Postcode district: LL15
- Dialling code: 01824
- Police: North Wales
- Fire: North Wales
- Ambulance: Welsh
- UK Parliament: Clwyd East
- Senedd Cymru – Welsh Parliament: Clwyd West

Llanrhydd or Llanrhudd is a village in the community of Llanbedr Dyffryn Clwyd, in Denbighshire, Wales, one and a half miles east of Ruthin; 'rhudd' being the Welsh name for 'red' – the colour of the local sandstone. Llanrhydd was a civil parish, on 31 December 1894 the parish was abolished with the rural part becoming Llanrhydd Rural and the part in Ruthin Municipal Borough becoming "Llanrhydd Urban". At the 1891 census (the last before the abolition of the parish), Llanrhydd had a population of 799.
