= List of crossings of the River Clwyd =

The River Clwyd (Welsh: Afon Clwyd) is a river in Wales that rises in the Clocaenog Forest (grid reference SJ045535) 5 mi (8 km) northwest of Corwen. It has many crossings. The Denbigh, Ruthin and Corwen Railway crossed the river seven times and remnants of some of these bridges survive.

Key to heritage status
Status	Criteria
I	Grade I listed. Bridge of exceptional interest, sometimes considered to be internationally important
II*	Grade II* listed. Particularly important bridge of more than special interest
II	Grade II listed. Bridge of national importance and special interest

Crossing	Date	Coordinates	Heritage status	Locality	Notes	Image
Footbridge	New in 2024	53.0563°N 3.4356°W	-	Clocaenog Forest	Bypasses ford.	Footbridge on River Clwyd in Clocaenog Forest
Pont Petryal		53.0511°N 3.4365°W	-	Clocaenog Forest	B5105	Pont Petryal
Melin-y-Wig Bridge		53.0276°N 3.4331°W	-	Melin-y-Wig		
Local access bridge		53.0271°N 3.4321°W	-	Melin-y-Wig		The_river_Clwyd_at_Melin-y-Wig_-_geograph.org.uk_-_3500754
Footbridge		53.0354°N 3.4131°W	-	Glyn-bach		Footbridge_over_the_River_Clwyd_at_Glyn_Bach_-_geograph.org.uk_-_5377598
Footbridge		53.03977°N 3.3857°W	-	Felin Meiarth		Footbridge over the River Clwyd near Felin Meiarth - geograph.org.uk - 1309669
Minor Road Bridge		53.0414°N 3.3789°W	-	Bryn Saith Marchog		
Farm Access Bridge		53.0443°N 3.3601°W	-	Pandy'r Capel		
Efail-y-plas Bridge	18th Cent	53.0485°N 3.3487°W	II	Derwen		Bridge_-_geograph.org.uk_-_124579
Farm Access Bridge		53.0553°N 3.334°W	-			
Pont Nant Clwyd		53.0574°N 3.331°W	-	Llanelidan	A494	
Pont Nant Clwyd	1776	53.0574°N 3.3308°W	II	Llanelidan	Old A494 route	Old_road_bridge_-_geograph.org.uk_-_1310284
Nantclwyd Hall Bridge	1965	53.058°N 3.3289°W	II	Llanelidan	Nantclwyd Hall Access	
Footbridge		53.05857°N 3.32777°W	-	Llanelidan		Quaint_footbridge_over_the_River_Clwyd_-_geograph.org.uk_-_1905365
Pwllglas Footbridge		53.0793°N 3.3229°W	-	Pwllglas		Footbridge over River Clwyd Pwllglas
Local Access Bridge		53.08°N 3.3187°W	-	Pwllglas		
Local Access Bridge		53.083°N 3.3143°W	-	Pwllglas		
Footbridge		53.0838°N 3.3114°W	-	Pwllglas	Former Railway Bridge	Bridge_near_Pwllglas_at_Craigadwywynt_and_Coed_Cilgroeslwyd_SSSI;_Dyffryn_Clwyd,_Sir_Ddinbych,_Cymru_(Wales)_113
Pont Eyarth	17th-18th Cent	53.0877°N 3.3052°W	II	Llanfair DC		Pont Eyarth over River Clwyd Llanfair DC
Farm Access Bridge		53.1005°N 3.3083°W	-	Ruthin	Ty'n-y-Wern	
Corwen Road Bridge		53.104°N 3.3104°W	-	Ruthin		
Tunnel Bridge	Early 19th Cent	53.1086°N 3.313°W	II	Ruthin	Scott House	Tunnel Bridge Ruthin
Ruthin Park Bridges		53.1117°N 3.3152°W	-	Ruthin	3 Footbridges	High_water_in_the_River_Clwyd_-_geograph.org.uk_-_2922655
Pont Howkin	1771	53.1133°N 3.3154°W	II	Ruthin		River_Clwyd_-_old_bridge_near_Cae_Ddol,_Ruthin
Pont y Plant	2007	53.1135°N 3.3147°W	-	Ruthin	Footbridge	Pont_y_Plant,_Ruthin_-_geograph.org.uk_-_290776
Park Road Bridge		53.1155°N 3.3136°W	-	Ruthin		A494 Bridge over River Clwyd in Ruthin
Footbridge	Early 19th Cent	53.1159°N 3.3137°W	II	Ruthin		Grade II listed Footbridge over River Clwyd Ruthin
Ruthin Bypass Bridge		53.1208°N 3.3152°W	-	Ruthin	A525	A525 Bridge over River Clwyd Ruthin
Water Treatment Access Bridge		53.1227°N 3.3137°W	-	Ruthin		Bridge and Weir at Water Treatment Plant Ruthin
Footbridge		53.1344°N 3.3164°W	-	Ruthin		Footbridge_over_the_Clwyd_-_geograph.org.uk_-_2334596
Pont Telpyn	Around 1800	53.1378°N 3.3177°W	II	Rhewl	Photo during repair work	Pont_Telpyn_-_geograph.org.uk_-_1260031
Pont Llanychan	Around 1800	53.1469°N 3.3269°W	II	Rhewl		Bridge over the River Clwyd near Llanychan (geograph 7631830)
Farm Access Bridge		53.1525°N 3.3321°W	-	Gellifor		
Pont Perfa	17th Cent (or early 18th)	53.1586°N 3.3389°W	II	Llanynys		Stone_bridge_-_geograph.org.uk_-_136277
Pont Clwyd	18th Cent	53.1673°N 3.3491°W	II	Llandyrnog		
Whitchurch Road Bridge		53.1822°N 3.362°W	-	Denbigh		Bridge_over_the_River_Clwyd_-_geograph.org.uk_-_1924162
Farm Access Bridge		53.2077°N 3.3766°W	-	Denbigh	Lleweni Hall	Bridge_over_the_river_Clwyd_at_Llewenibridge_-_geograph.org.uk_-_1153374
Pont Ruffydd	1784	53.2156°N 3.3801°W	II	Bodfari	A541	Bridge_over_the_River_Clwyd_-_geograph.org.uk_-_1161622
Demolished Railway Bridge		53.2173°N 3.3808°W	-	Mold and Denbigh Junction Railway	Now Demolished	Disused_railway_bridge_over_the_River_Clwyd,_1_mile_west_of_Bodfari._-_geograph.org.uk_-_204604
Pont-y-cambwll	Late 16th Cent	53.2275°N 3.3931°W	II	Bodfari		Bridge_over_the_River_Clwyd_-_geograph.org.uk_-_29540
Pont Llannerch	Around 1800	53.2363°N 3.4112°W	II	Trefnant	Washed away Jan 2021 (historic photo)	Pont_Llanerch_-_geograph.org.uk_-_6057770
Footbridge		53.2402°N 3.4152°W	-	Llannerch_Hall		
Footbridge		53.2499°N 3.4227°W	-	St Asaph		"Aluminium"_Footbridge_over_the_River_Clwyd_-_geograph.org.uk_-_1945275
Chester St Bridge		53.262°N 3.4339°W	-	St Asaph	A525	The_A525_crosses_the_River_Clwyd_at_St_Asaph_-_geograph.org.uk_-_2735834
A55 Bridge		53.2628°N 3.4352°W	-	St Asaph	A55	The River Clwyd from below the A55 bridge at St Asaph - geograph.org.uk - 2735831
Pont Dafydd	1630	53.2637°N 3.4349°W	II	St Asaph	Marooned following rerouting of river	PontDafyddWales20110508_010
Rhuddlan Bridge	1595, subsequent alterations	53.2899°N 3.4688°W	II*	Rhuddlan		Bridge_over_the_River_Clwyd_-_geograph.org.uk_-_4169025
Rhuddlan Footbridge		53.29°N 3.469°W	-	Rhuddlan		Bridges_over_the_River_Clwyd_at_Rhuddlan_-_geograph.org.uk_-_5159436
A525 bridge		53.2911°N 3.4726°W	-	Rhuddlan	A525	Pontclwyd_607773
Foryd Bridge		53.3094°N 3.5061°W	-	North Wales Main Line		Railway_over_the_Clwyd_-_geograph.org.uk_-_2566257
Foryd Harbour Bridge	1932	53.313°N 3.5105°W	II	Kinmel Bay		Foryd_Bridge_over_River_Clwyd_-_geograph.org.uk_-_31943
Pont y Ddraig	2013	53.3149°N 3.5079°W	-	Kinmel Bay	Lifting footbridge	Pont_y_Ddraig_-_Dragon's_Bridge_open_-_geograph.org.uk_-_4110167
