= Nathaniel Jones (poet) =

Welsh poet

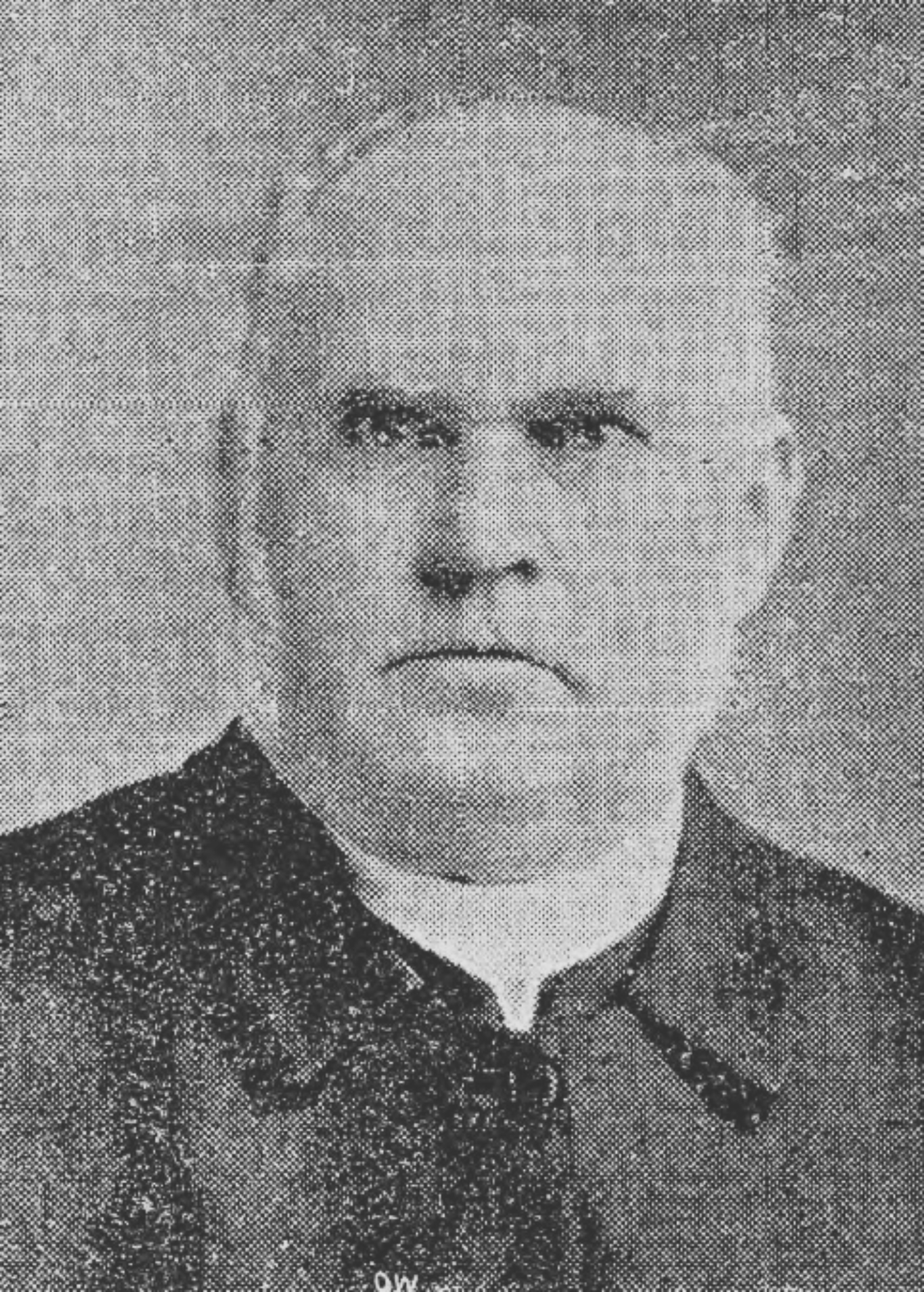
Nathaniel "Cynhafal" Jones

Nathaniel Jones (19 April 1832 – 14 December 1905) was a Welsh Calvinistic Methodist minister and poet.

Nathaniel Jones took his bardic name of "Cynhafal" from his birthplace of Llangynhafal, near Ruthin in Denbighshire, where the church is dedicated to Saint Cynhafal. He worked as a tailor, and later as a sales assistant, before becoming a preacher in 1859. He attended the Calvinistic Methodist College at Bala before becoming a minister at Penrhyndeudraeth in 1865.

== Works ==
- Fy Awenydd (1859)
- Elias y Thesbiad (1869)
- Y Messiah (1895)
- Charles o'r Bala (1898)

== Sources ==
- "JONES, NATHANIEL CYNHAFAL, (1832 - 1905)". Dictionary of Welsh Biography. National Library of Wales.
