= St Saeran's Church, Llanynys =

Church in Denbighshire, Wales

Coordinates: 53.1536°N 3.3425°W

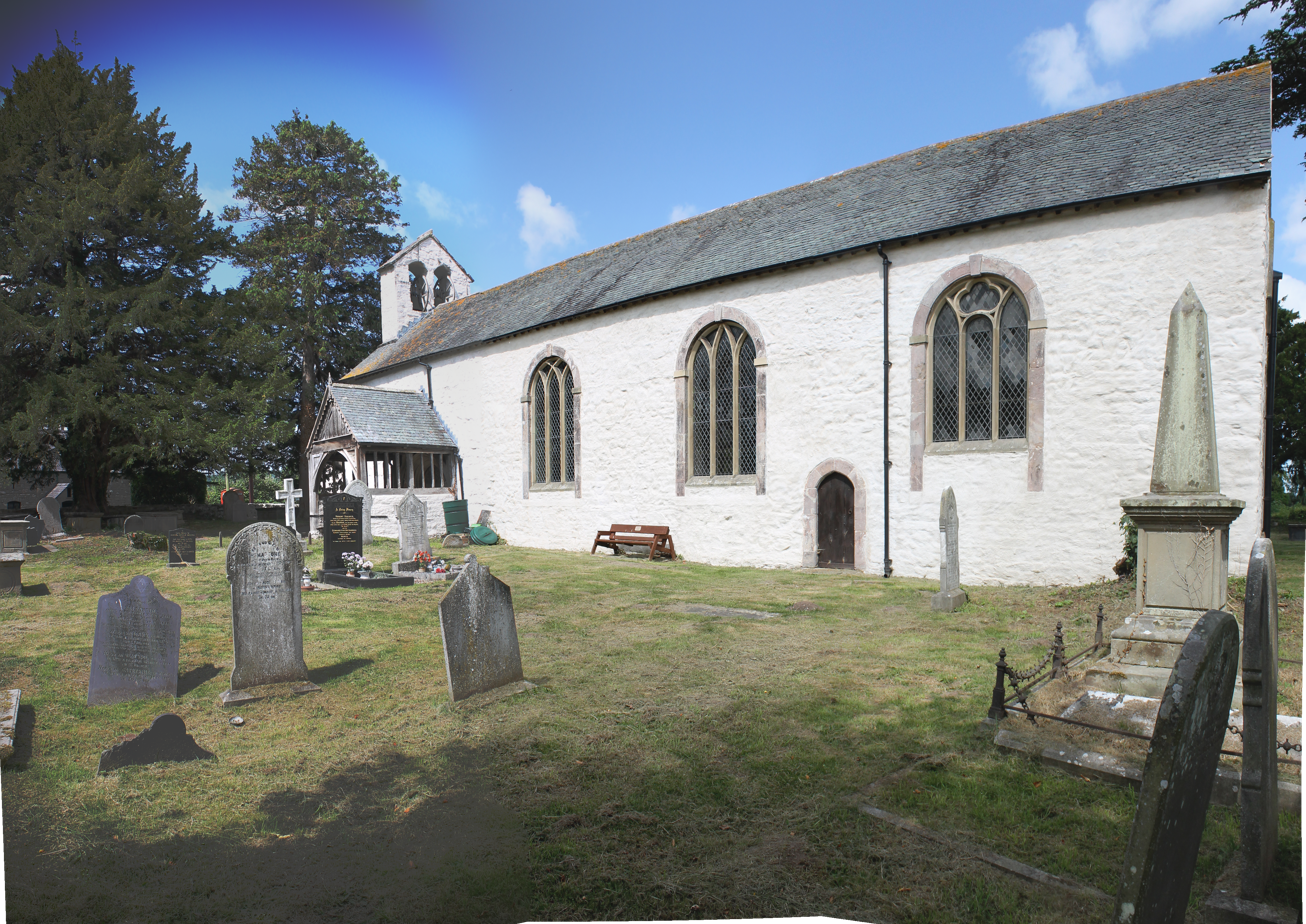
St Saeran's Church, Llanynys, in July 2015

St Saeran's Church lies in the village of Llanynys, Denbighshire, Wales. It was listed by Cadw at Grade I on 19 July 1966 (Cadw Building ID: 808). Between 2013 and 2015 £2.5 million was spent preserving the church, which has one of the finest medieval paintings in North Wales. The church's former importance is today evidenced in the sheer size of the interior which is large and spacious; it had close links with the Bishops of Bangor, who were its "rectors" or owners. Like many Denbighshire churches it is double-naved and has a fine pair of the characteristically local late-medieval hammerbeam roofs. The fluted timber pillars between the naves are more unusual, and much later, dating from a restoration in 1768.

The church was founded in the 6th century, but the site may be of Celtic origin, and was home to a clas or religious community; it was the mother church of southern Dyffryn Clwyd (the Vale of Clwyd). Unusually, it was dedicated to Saint Saeran, a Celtic bishop-saint who also gave his name to Ffynnon Sara.

== Saint Saeran ==
Little is known of Saeran. He is first mentioned in MSE (appendix) of 'Bonedd y Saint', which exists handwritten by Guto'r Glyn in 1455. He was the son of Geraint Saer of Ireland. Saer is the Welsh for "wright" or "carpenter" and the ending "-an" is a diminutive: "Saer the Younger".

The battered tomb effigy of a priest may be Bishop ap Richard of Bangor (who died here in 1267) while the figure of a mitred bishop on the hexagonal stone may represent Saint Saeran himself. Crozier in hand, the little figure is apparently standing on a muzzled bear, and on the stone's reverse is a crucifixion scene. It stood until recently in the churchyard, and perhaps marked the saint's tomb or shrine: said to be of the 14th century, it could be much older.

== The wall painting ==
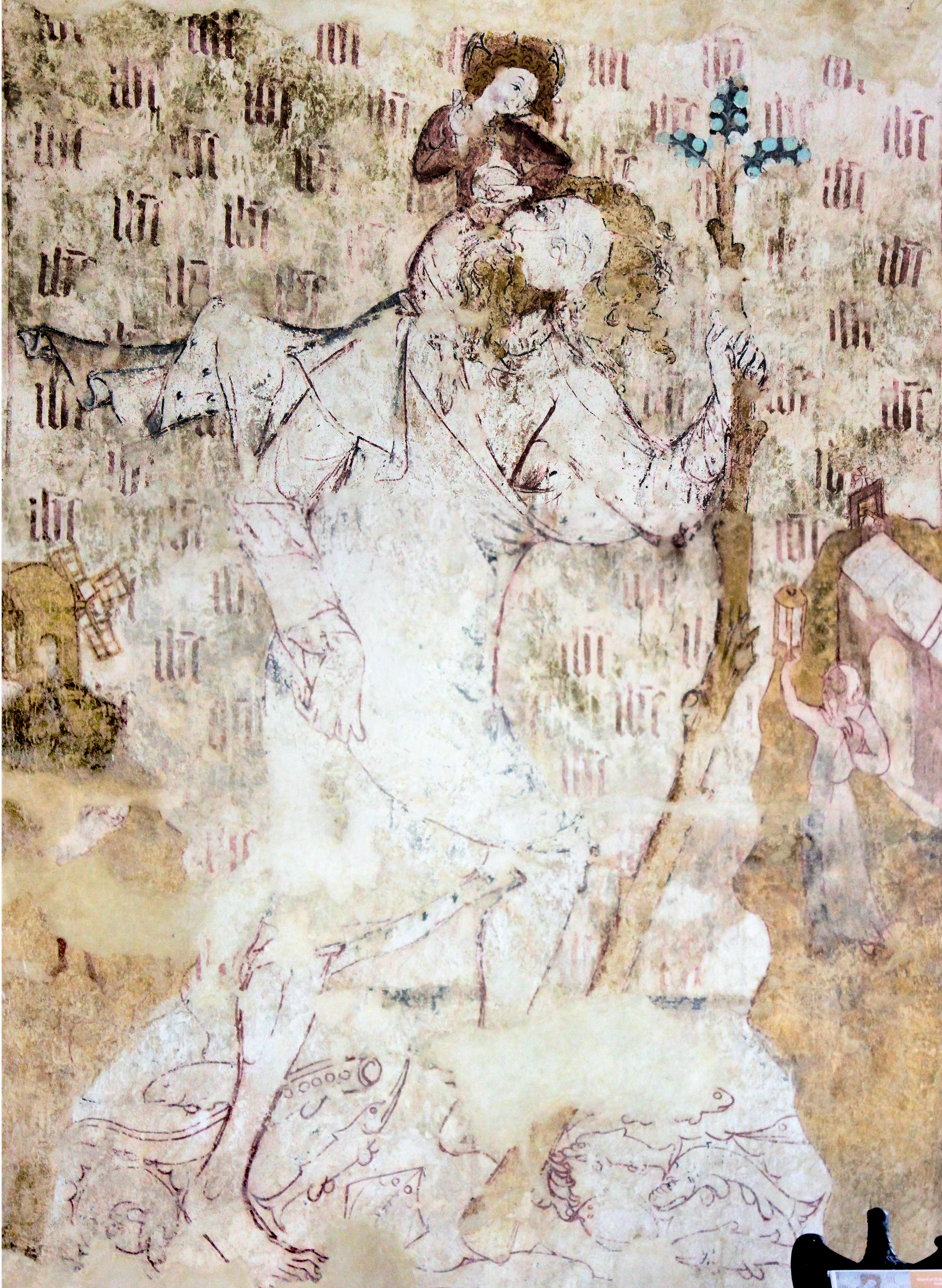
14th- to 15th-century painting of Saint Christopher carrying Christ on his shoulders.

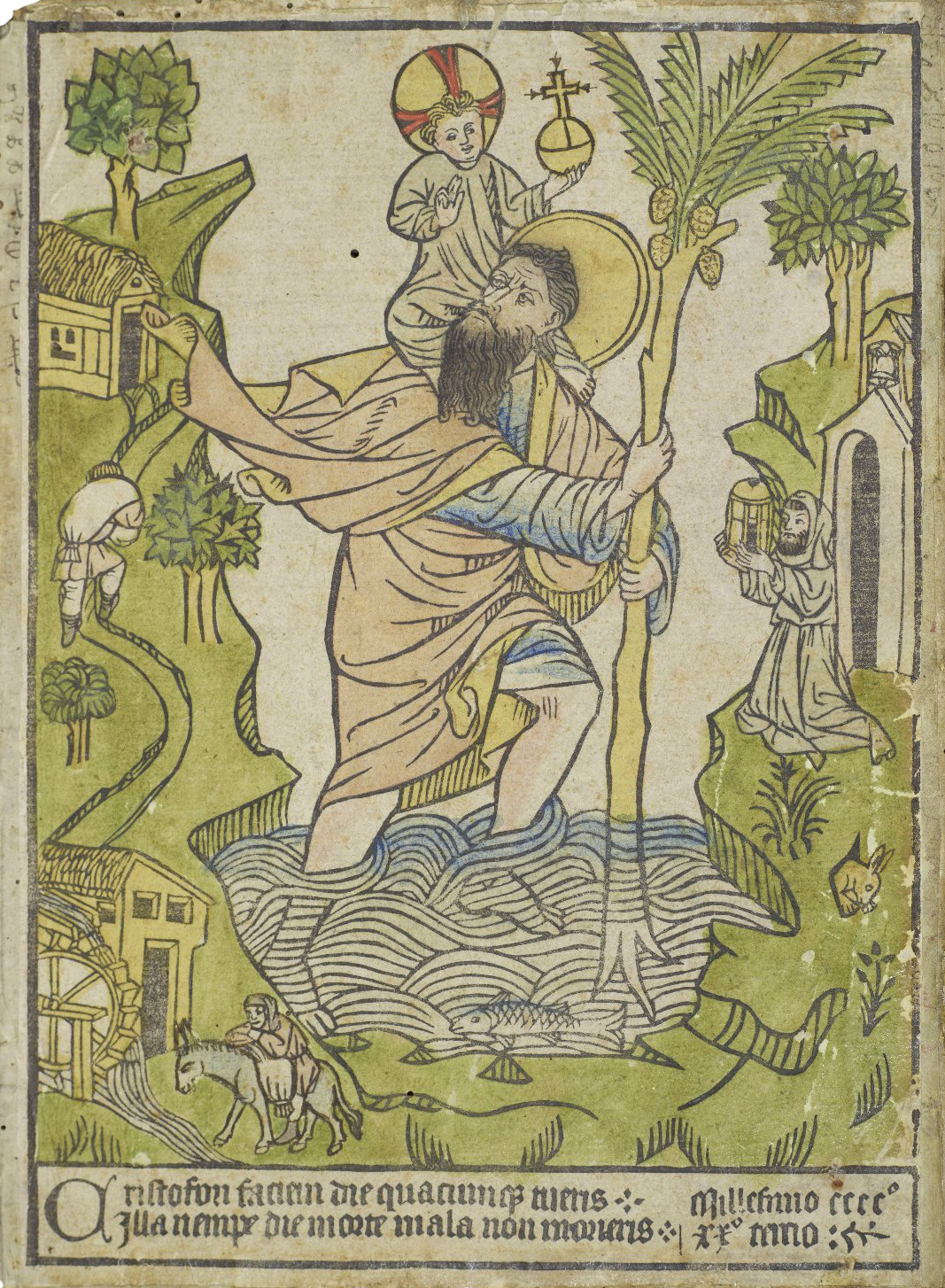
Saint Christopher- The Buxheim engraving (1450)

Directly opposite the door is the most significant work in St Saeran's, a huge 15th-century mural of Saint Christopher. The painting was rediscovered under plaster in 1967; this rare survival is much the finest medieval wall painting in North Wales.

The image is very similar to one of the oldest known woodcut prints, the Buxheim engraving, probably made between 1450 in southern Germany and Switzerland. The Llanynys fresco painter certainly knew it. The saint is depicted in a similar way, but with much more detailed marine life than in the Buxheim engraving — almost as if to make Christopher more Welsh.

The saint – according to legend a giant who served as a ferryman – is shown carrying the infant Christ across a river, with a flowering staff in his hand and a shoal of fish round his feet. The patron saint of travellers, Christopher ("Christ-bearer") was often painted opposite church doorways, where wayfarers could easily glimpse his image and thus (it was believed) be preserved from "fainting or falling" all that day. The belief lives on in the Saint Christophers of modern key-rings and car dashboards.
