= Derwen railway station =

Former railway station in Denbighshire, Wales

Derwen

General information
- Location: Derwen, Denbighshire; Wales
- Coordinates: 53.0425°N 3.3774°W
- Grid reference: SJ077504
- Platforms: 1

Other information
- Status: Disused

History
- Opened: 6 October 1864
- Closed: 30 April 1962 (for freight)
- Original company: Denbigh, Ruthin and Corwen Railway
- Pre-grouping: London and North Western Railway
- Post-grouping: London, Midland and Scottish Railway

Key dates
- 2 February 1953: closed for passengers
Location

Derwen railway station was a station in Derwen, Denbighshire, Wales. The station was opened on 6 October 1864 and closed for passengers in 1953 and completely on 30 April 1962. The station building is now a private residence. The platform also still exists.

Preceding station	Disused railways	Following station
Nantclwyd; Line and station closed	London and North Western Railway; Denbigh, Ruthin and Corwen Railway	Gwyddelwern; Line and station closed
