= Rhewl railway station =

Former railway station in Denbighshire, Wales

Rhewl

General information
- Location: Rhewl, Llanynys, Denbighshire; Wales
- Coordinates: 53.1341°N 3.3283°W
- Grid reference: SJ112605
- Platforms: 1

Other information
- Status: Disused

History
- Original company: Denbigh, Ruthin and Corwen Railway
- Pre-grouping: London and North Western Railway
- Post-grouping: London, Midland and Scottish Railway

Key dates
- 1 March 1862: Opened
- 30 April 1962: Closed
Location

Rhewl railway station was a station in Rhewl, Llanynys, Denbighshire, Wales. The station was opened on 1 March 1862 and closed on 30 April 1962. The main station building and sections of the platform are still extant and in use as a private dwelling.

Preceding station	Disused railways	Following station
Llanrhaiadr; Line and station closed	London and North Western Railway; Denbigh, Ruthin and Corwen Railway	Ruthin; Line and station closed
