= Plas Coch, Ruthin =

Building in Denbighshire, Wales

Plas Uchaf
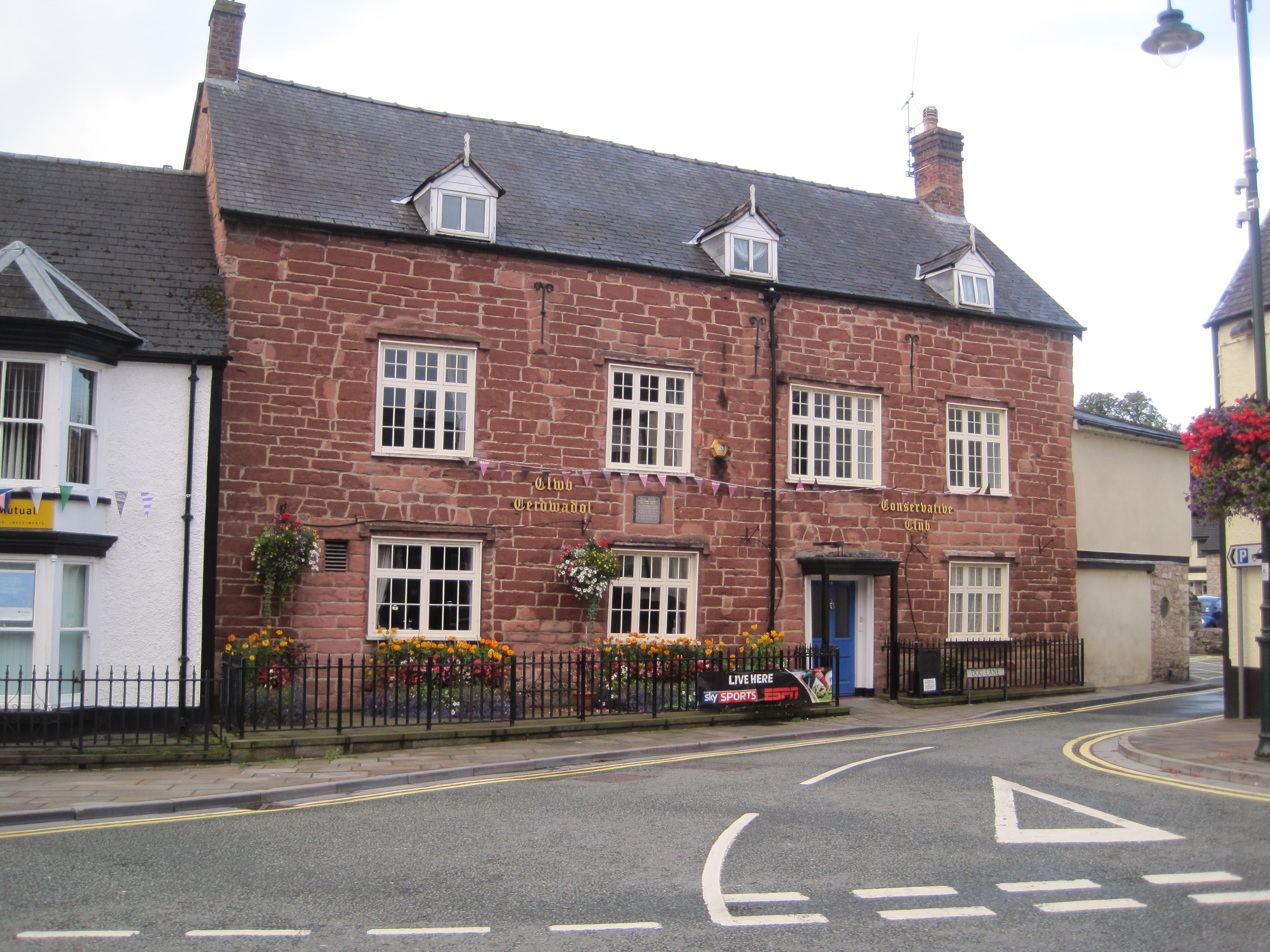
- Plas Coch
- Interactive map of the Plas Uchaf area

General information
- Location: Ruthin, Wales
- Coordinates: 53.1132°N 3.3066°W
- Construction started: 15th century

Listed Building – Grade II
- Official name: Conservative Club
- Designated: 24 October 1950
- Reference no.: 946

Plas Coch (also known as 24 and 26 Well St) is a building in Ruthin, Denbighshire, that was Grade II listed on 24 October 1950. It is of medieval origin and is a former 17th-century large town house. It was built in 1613 using red sandstone from the castle; it became home to the constable of the castle. The building is two-storey with attics and has four large windows on each floor. In 1963 it became a banqueting hall owned by Rees Jones who used to trade at the village hall in Llanfair. It became the Conservative Club in 1977 and was slightly altered, offering all-round facilities for functions. In 2025 Plas Coch was opened as 'The Dreamatorium' by Lavinia Stamps, a Ruthin-based crafting business.

It has been listed as being architecture of exceptional value for being "a large early C17 town-house, unusual for its stone construction in this area".
