= Rhewl =

Rhewl may refer to:

- Rhewl, Llanynys, Denbighshire – a village on the River Clwedog in Denbighshire, Wales, United Kingdom
- Rhewl, Wrexham – a place near the village of Overton in Wrexham, Wales, United Kingdom
- Rhewl, Llantysilio, Denbighshire – a place on the River Dee near Llantysilio in Denbighshire, Wales, United Kingdom
- Rhewl, Llanrhaeadr-yng-Nghinmeirch, Denbighshire – a place near the Nant Mawr in Denbighshire, Wales, United Kingdom
- Rhewl, Shropshire – a place near the village of Gobowen in Shropshire, England, United Kingdom
