= Dragon Bridge =

Dragon Bridge may refer to:

- Dragon Bridge (Ljubljana) in Ljubljana, Slovenia
- Dragon Bridge (Da Nang) in Vietnam
- Dragon Bridge (Sha Tin District) (錦龍橋) on Sha Tin Road, Hong Kong
- A pedestrian bridge (Drakonov Most) in Alexander Park of Tsarskoe Selo, St. Petersburg, Russia

== See also ==
- Bridge of Dragons, 1999 American romantic action film
- Dragon's Bridge (Pont y Ddraig), Wales
