= Ty Coch Cruck Barn, Llangynhafal, Denbighshire =

Building in Denbighshire, Wales

Cruck barn, Ty Coch, Llangynhafal, Denbighshire
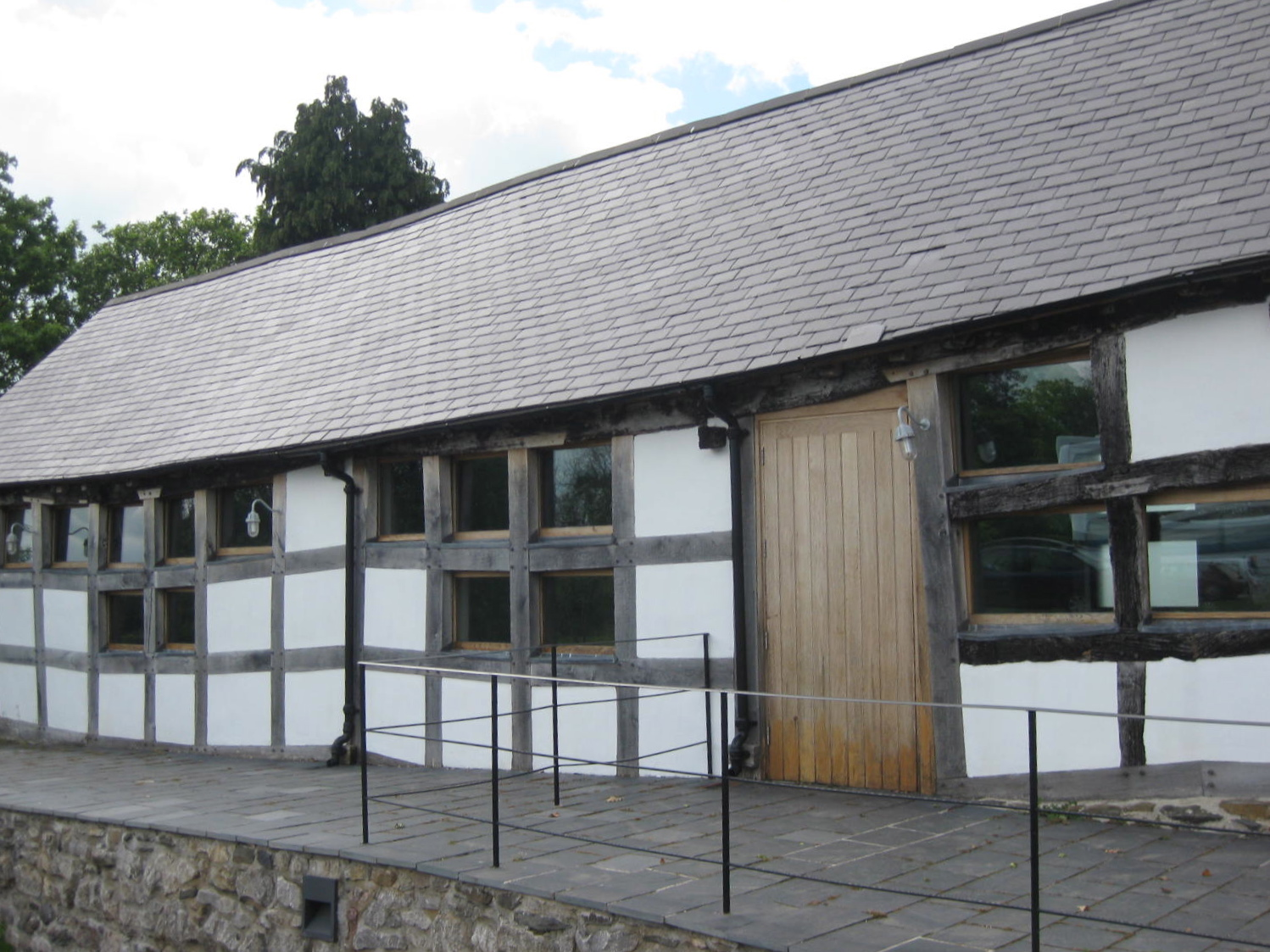
- Cruck barn, Ty Coch, Llangynhafal, Denbighshire

- Location in Denbighshire

General information
- Location: Denbighshire, Wales, UK
- Coordinates: 53.164192°N 3.303767°W
- OS grid: SJ1293263800

The Cruck barn on the Ty Coch estate at Llangynhafal, Denbighshire, is a timber framed building, which has been dated by dendrochronology to 1430. It is one of the earliest timber-framed buildings in Wales. Although there is evidence that the building was a house originally, it was converted to agricultural use and is often described as a barn.

The significance of the barn was recognised by Cadw in 2002 when it was listed as a Grade II listed building. Previously the building had been thought to be 17th century. It has recently been restored by the Denbighshire County Council, with European and other grant funding, as part of a small workshop complex.

== Description ==
It is a 5-bay cruck structure. The building was originally a house consisting of an inner room (one bay), a hall with passage (2 bays), and a cow house (2 bays).

The end gables were replaced in stone, probably in the 18th century with side walls that are 3-panel high timber-framing, infilled originally with brick nogging, resting on a plinth of rubble stonework. To the north side the timber-framing is largely intact, but to the south, much of the timber-framing has had to be replaced. Timbers at the upper end show signs of smoke blackening, indicating that it was formerly a house. Mortices survive for wind-braces – two to each bay. The matching ‘blades’ of each cruck truss are sawn on only one surface, with the other surface curved. This is a result of the vertical separation of the matching curved branch that formed the cruck, after being cut from a tree..

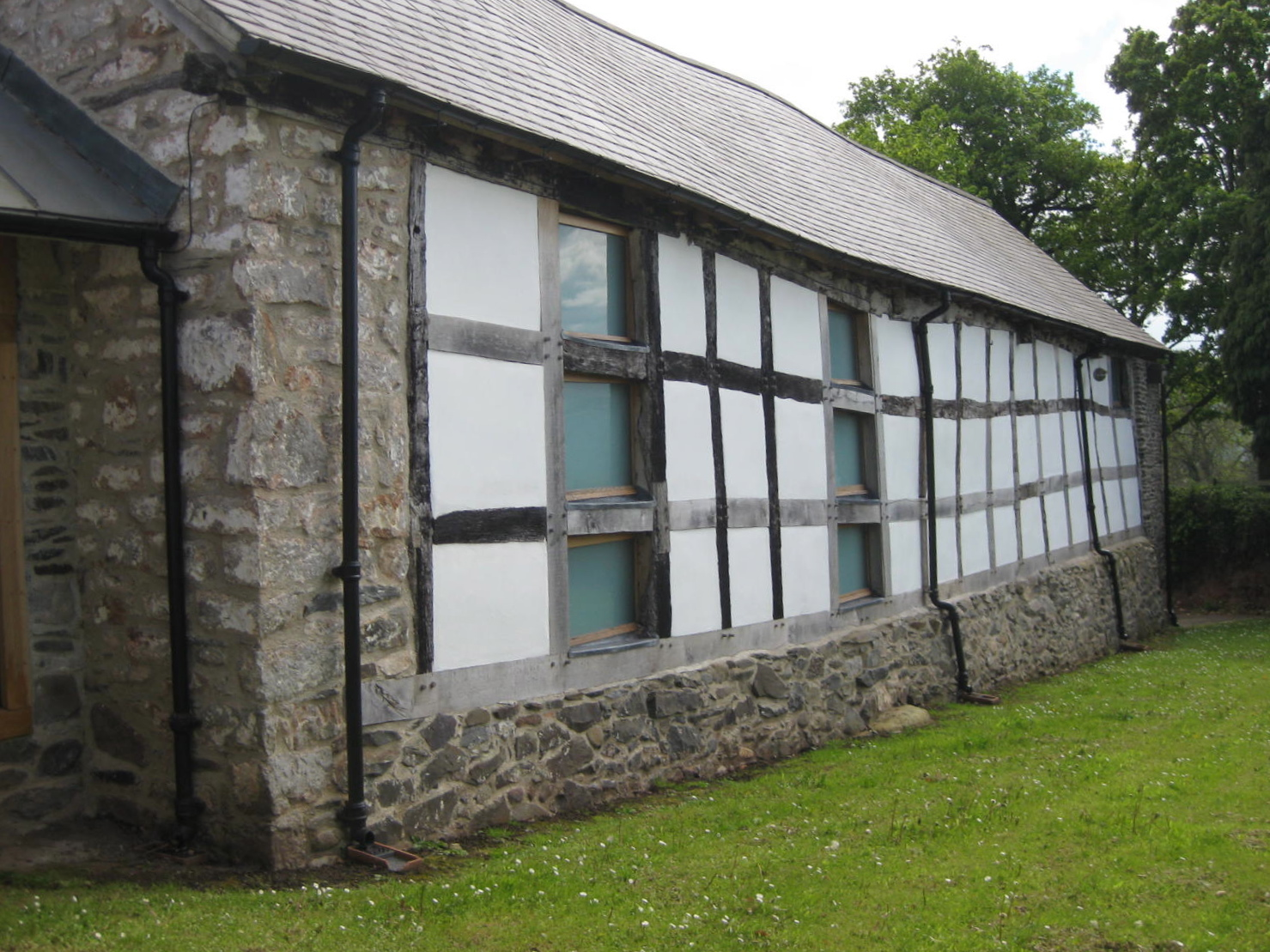
Timber framed Cruck Barn at Ty-Coch

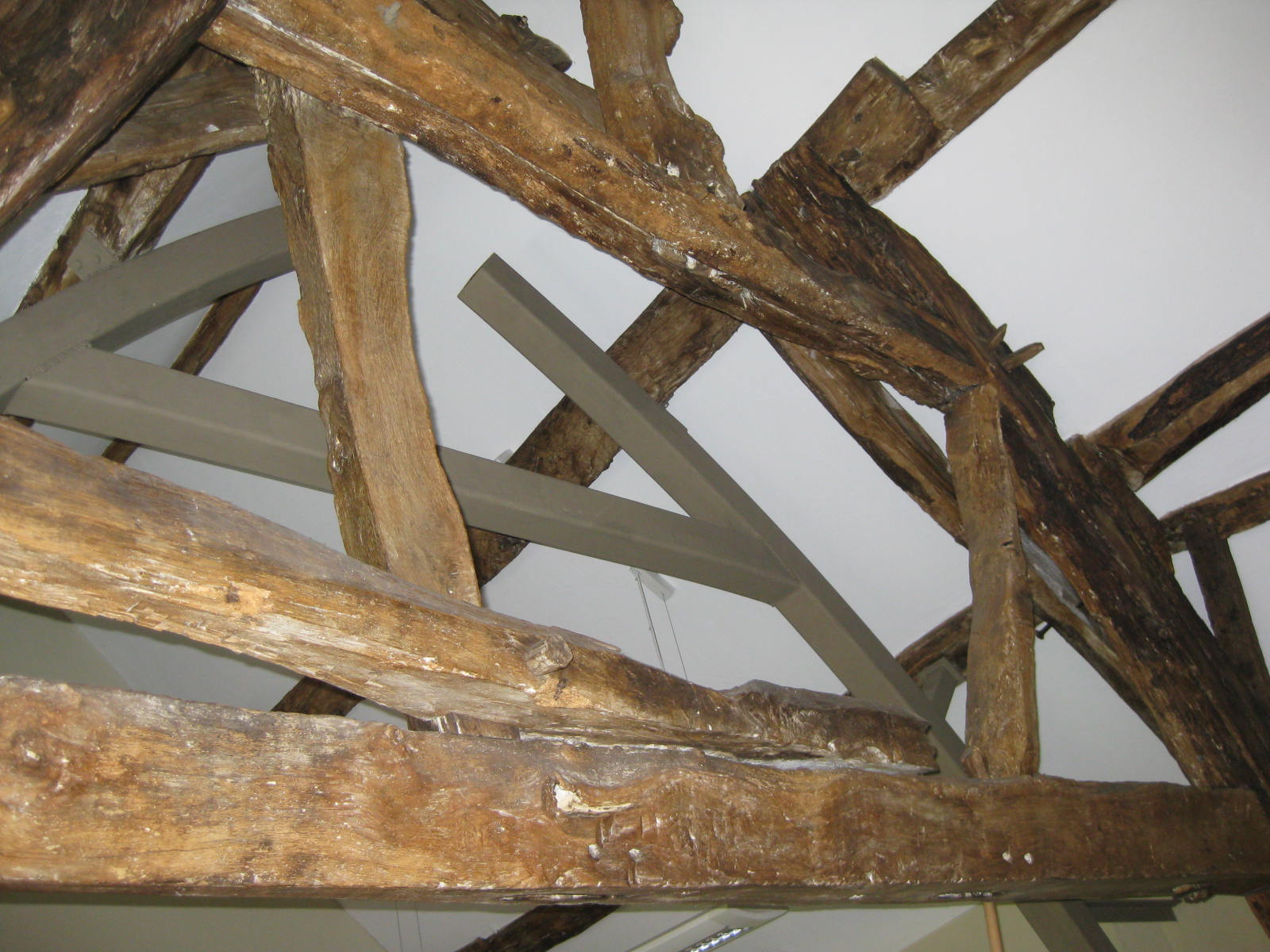
End bay to barn with new metal support to cruck frame

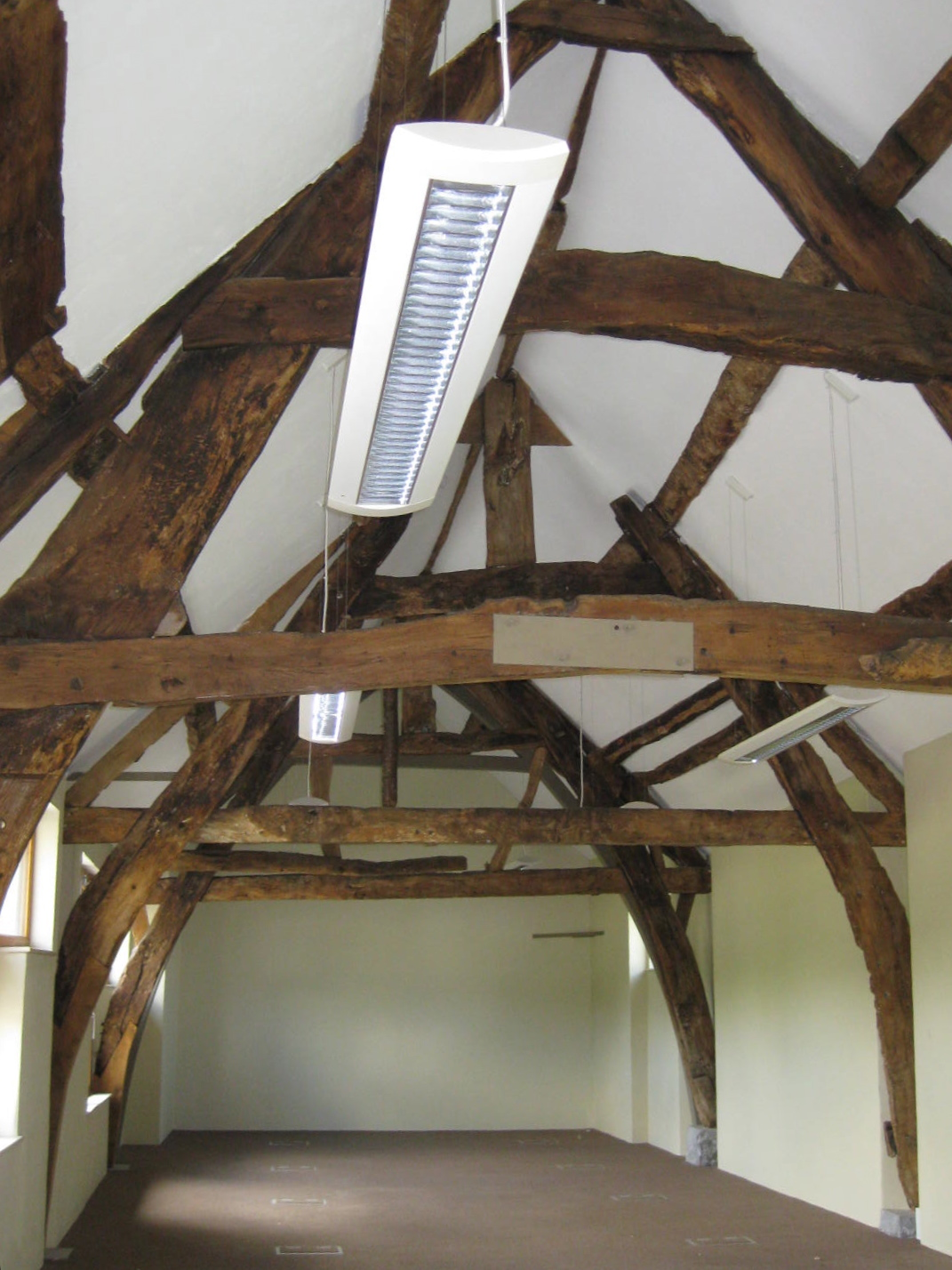
Cruck frame, lower three bays.

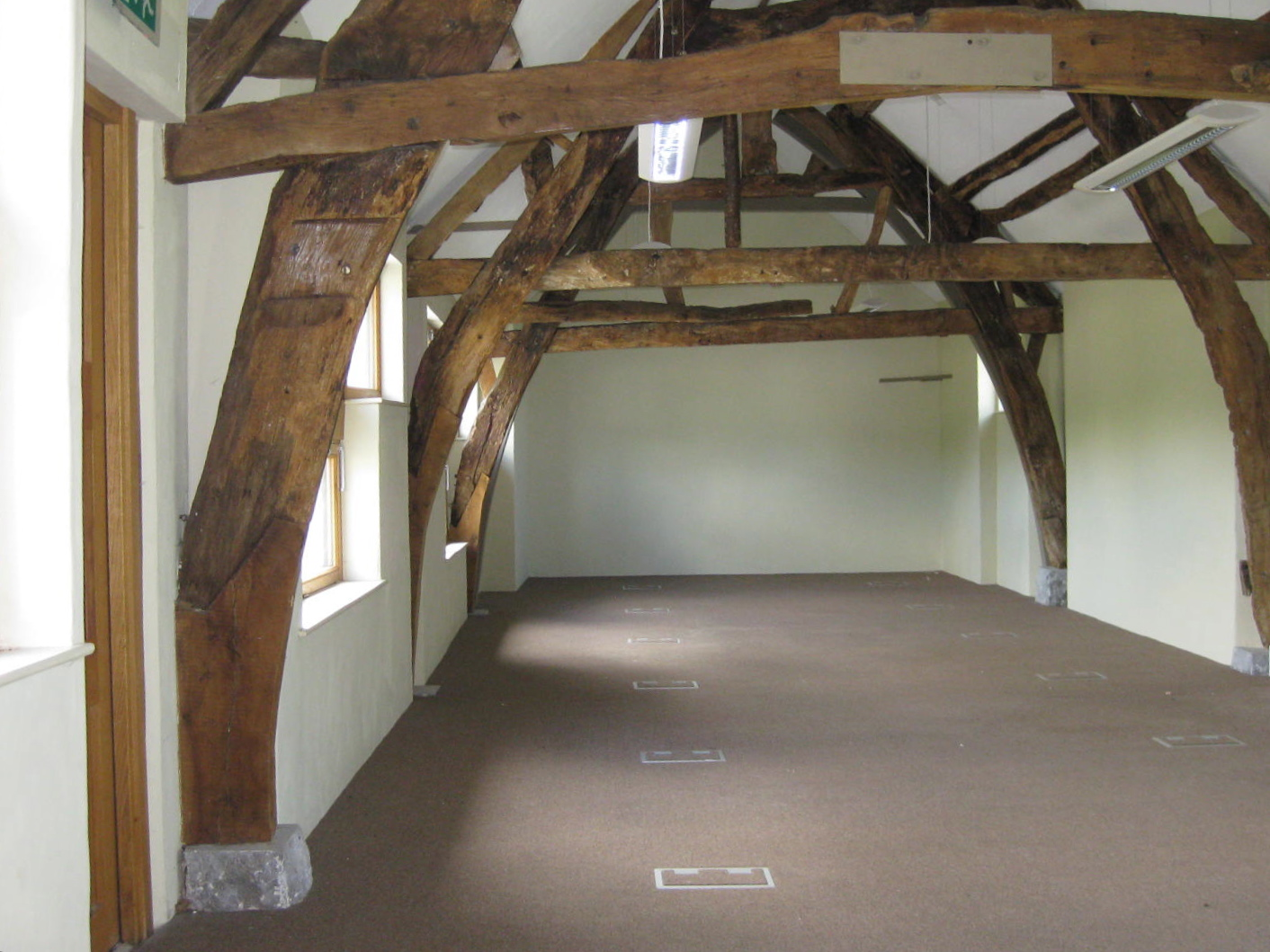
Detail of Cruck frame at Ty-Coch

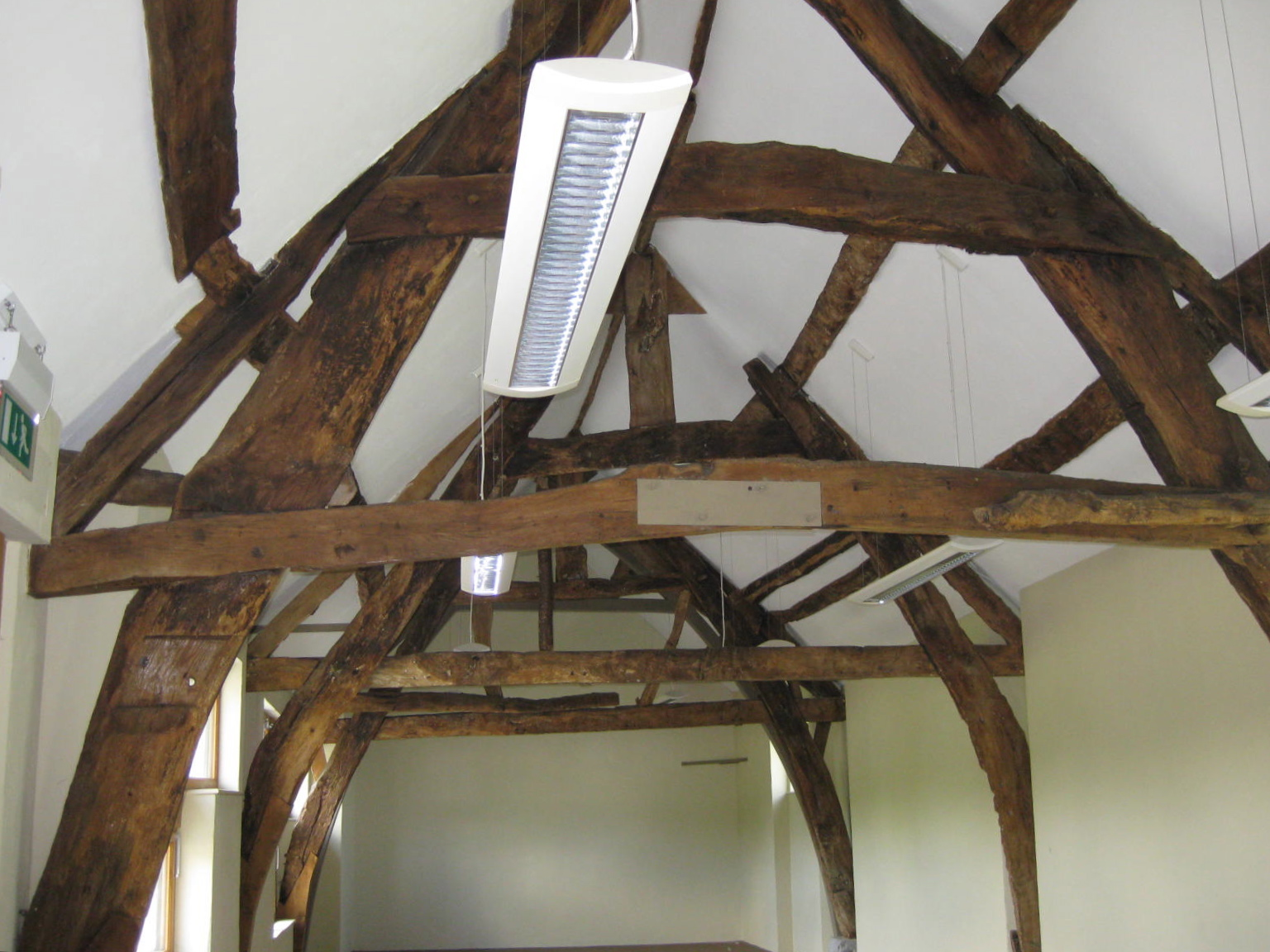
Detail of Cruck frame at Ty-Coch

== Literature ==
- Alcock N W Cruck Construction: An introduction and catalogue. CBA Research Report no 42, 1981.
- Alcock, N. W., Barley, M. W. et al. (1996), Recording timber-framed buildings – An illustrated glossary, Council for British Archaeology, York. ISBN 1872414729
- Smith P Houses of the Welsh Countryside, 2nd Edition, 1988, HMSO/ RCAHMW
- Suggett R and Stevenson G Introducing Houses of the Welsh Countryside. Cyflwyno Cartrefi Cefn Gwlad Cymru, Y Lolfa/ RCAHMW, 2010
