= Ffynnon Sara =

Building in Denbighshire, Wales

- Location within Denbighshire

General information
- Status: Completed
- Location: Derwen, Denbighshire, Wales
- Coordinates: 53.052962°N 3.397308°W

Website
- Cadw

References
- Cadw 24347

Ffynnon Sara is a Grade II listed building in the community of Derwen, Denbighshire, Wales, which dates back to the 6th century. It is listed by Cadw (Reference Number 24347).

Ffynnon Sara is a well near the small village of Derwen, Ruthin. The well is suspected of being linked to a founder of a monastery 8 miles away in Llanynys. This is due to the well standing by an ancient pilgrim trackway. Ffynon Sara is estimated to have been built around the 6th century. Up until the 17th century the name was Ffynnon Pyllau Perl ("The Pearl Pool Well"). A woman living in a nearby cottage named Sara became well known for tending the well hence the name was changed to Ffynnon Sara (Sarah's Well). Those cured at the well left sticks at Sara's cottage as a gift of thanks. There is no sign of the cottage today as it is believed to have burnt down in the 1860s. The well was repaired and now stands in its own grounds. There is access by a beautiful tree lined, cobbled path through a small gate set back off the road.

== Location ==
This building is 1 km north west of Derwen church, in a small roadside enclosure with perimeter wall and gate.
