= Nantclwyd railway station =

Former railway station in Denbighshire, Wales

Nantclwyd

General information
- Location: Near Nantclwyd Hall, Llanelidan, Denbighshire; Wales
- Coordinates: 53.0556°N 3.3346°W
- Grid reference: SJ105517
- Platforms: 1

Other information
- Status: Disused

History
- Original company: Denbigh, Ruthin and Corwen Railway
- Pre-grouping: London and North Western Railway
- Post-grouping: London, Midland and Scottish Railway

Key dates
- 22 September 1864: Opened
- 2 February 1953: Closed for passengers
- 30 April 1962: Closed completely
Location

Nantclwyd railway station was a station near Nantclwyd Hall, Llanelidan, Denbighshire, Wales.

The station was opened on 22 September 1864 by the Denbigh, Ruthin and Corwen Railway.

It was host to an LMS caravan from 1934 to 1939.

The station closed to passengers on 2 February 1953, and completely on 30 April 1962.

The station was demolished in the 1970s and only the approach road exists today.

Preceding station	Disused railways	Following station
Eyarth; Line and station closed	London and North Western Railway; Denbigh, Ruthin and Corwen Railway	Derwen; Line and station closed
