= Eyarth railway station =

Former railway station in Denbighshire, Wales

Coordinates: 53.0921°N 3.2997°W

Eyarth
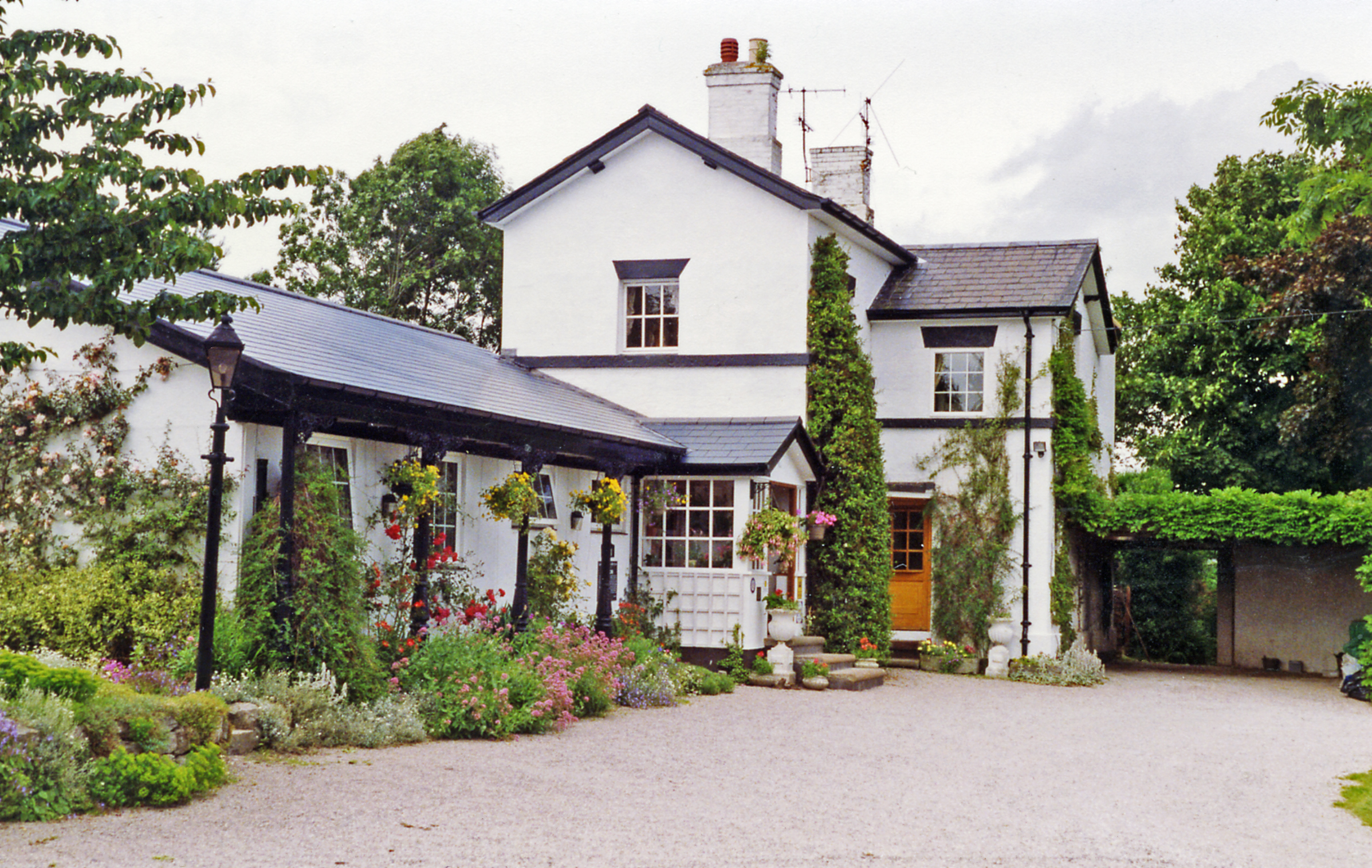
- The former station in 1993

General information
- Location: Eyarth, Denbighshire; Wales
- Platforms: 1

Other information
- Status: Disused

History
- Original company: Denbigh, Ruthin and Corwen Railway
- Pre-grouping: London and North Western Railway
- Post-grouping: London, Midland and Scottish Railway

Key dates
- 6 October 1864: Opened
- 2 February 1953: closed for regular passengers
- 30 April 1962: Closed completely
Location

Eyarth railway station served the village of Llanfair Dyffryn Clwyd in Denbighshire, Wales, between the years of 1864 and 1962. It is located west off an unnamed minor road off Wrexham road south of Ruthin (grid reference SJ 131557). It had one platform and a goods loop at the end. The station house is now a Bed and Breakfast and part of the platform still exists,

Preceding station	Disused railways	Following station
Ruthin	London and North Western Railway; Denbigh, Ruthin and Corwen Railway	Nantclwyd
