= Ruthin railway station =

Former railway station in Denbighshire, Wales

Ruthin
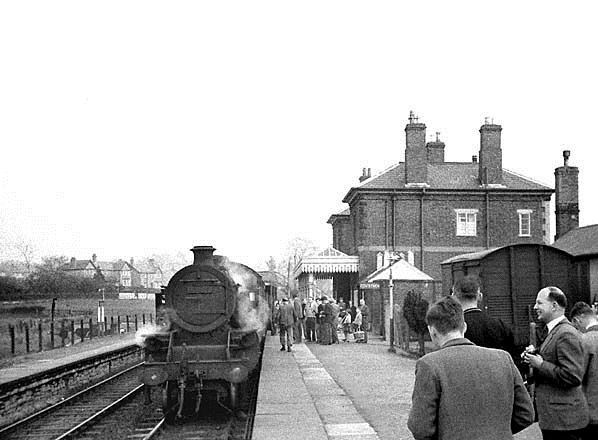

General information
- Location: Ruthin, Denbighshire; Wales
- Coordinates: 53.11688°N 3.30779°W
- Platforms: 2

Other information
- Status: Disused

History
- Original company: Denbigh, Ruthin and Corwen Railway
- Pre-grouping: London and North Western Railway
- Post-grouping: London, Midland and Scottish Railway

Key dates
- 1 March 1862: Opened
- 30 April 1962: Closed
Location

Ruthin Railway Station served the town of Ruthin in Denbighshire, Wales, between the 1862 and 1962. It was the main headquarters of the Denbigh, Ruthin and Corwen Railway. It had two platforms, a bay siding and a goods shed that opened into a second bay platform. The station was demolished after its closure and the Ruthin Craft Centre was built in its place. A goods crane at the Craft Centre's car park entrance is all that remains of the station.

Preceding station	Disused railways	Following station
Rhewl	London and North Western Railway; Denbigh, Ruthin and Corwen Railway	Eyarth
