= Gwyddelwern railway station =

Former railway station in Denbighshire, Wales

Gwyddelwern
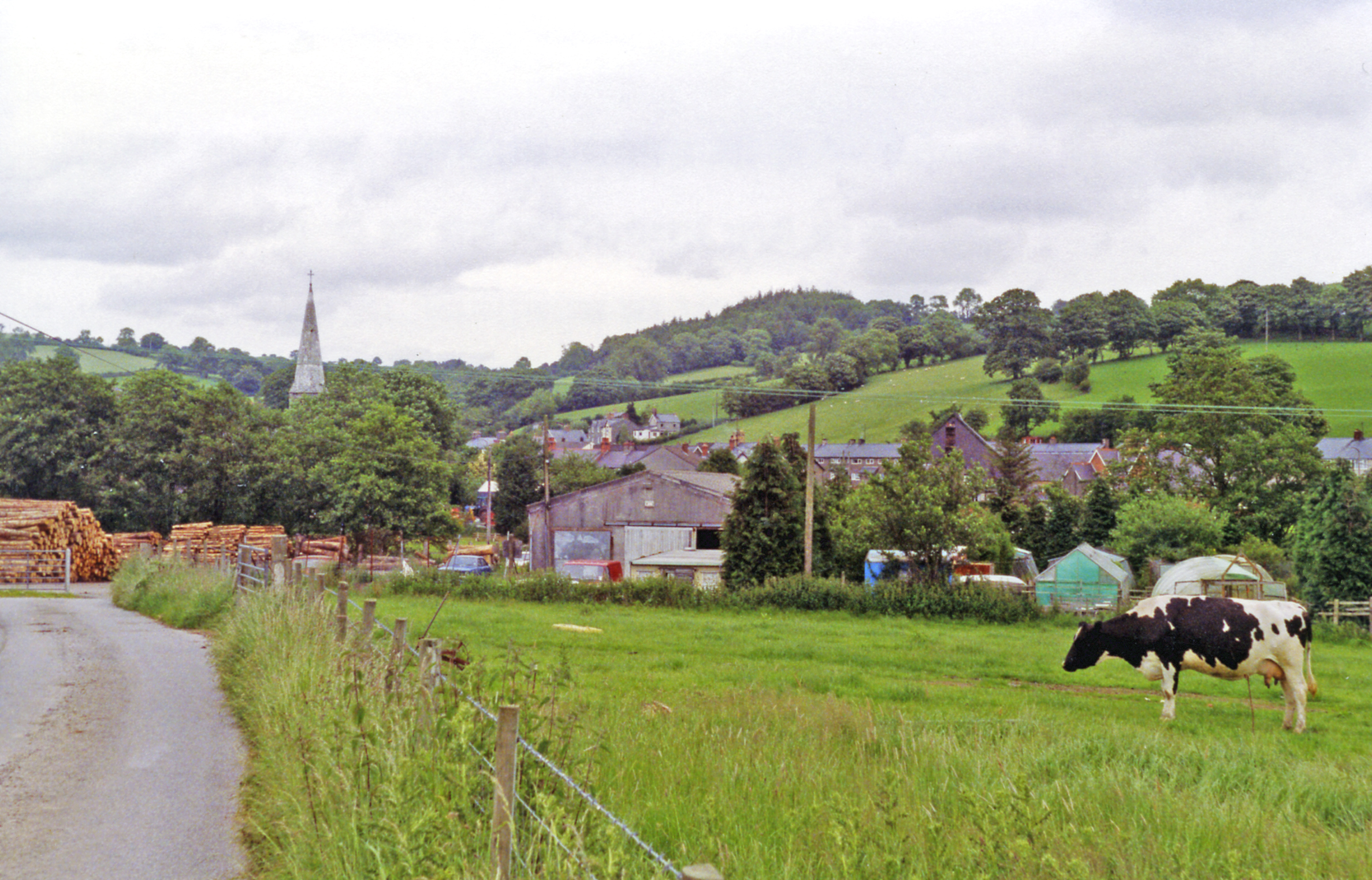
- The site of the station in 1993

General information
- Location: Gwyddelwern, Denbighshire; Wales
- Coordinates: 53.0082°N 3.3829°W
- Grid reference: SJ073465
- Platforms: 1

Other information
- Status: Disused

History
- Original company: Denbigh, Ruthin and Corwen Railway
- Pre-grouping: London and North Western Railway
- Post-grouping: London, Midland and Scottish Railway

Key dates
- 1 March 1863: Opened
- 2 February 1953: Closed to passengers
- 2 December 1957: Closed
Location

Gwyddelwern railway station was a station in Gwyddelwern, Denbighshire formerly within Merionethshire, Wales. The station was opened on 1 March 1863, closed to passengers on 2 February 1953 and closed completely on 2 December 1957. Nothing remains of the station today and the site is occupied by a sawmill.

Preceding station	Disused railways	Following station
Derwen; Line and station closed	London and North Western Railway; Denbigh, Ruthin and Corwen Railway	Corwen; Line and station closed
