= Llanrhaiadr railway station =

Former railway station in Denbighshire, Wales

Llanrhaiadr

General information
- Location: Llanrhaeadr-yng-Nghinmeirch, Denbighshire; Wales
- Coordinates: 53.1576°N 3.3563°W
- Grid reference: SJ094632
- Platforms: 1

Other information
- Status: Disused

History
- Original company: Denbigh, Ruthin and Corwen Railway
- Pre-grouping: London and North Western Railway
- Post-grouping: London, Midland and Scottish Railway

Key dates
- 1 March 1862: Opened
- 2 February 1953: Closed
Location

Llanrhaiadr railway station was one mile from the village of Llanrhaeadr-yng-Nghinmeirch, Denbighshire, Wales. The station was opened on 1 March 1862 and closed on 2 February 1953. It was demolished in the 1970s and there is no trace of its existence today.

Preceding station	Disused railways	Following station
Denbigh; Line and station closed	London and North Western Railway; Denbigh, Ruthin and Corwen Railway	Rhewl; Line and station closed
