= Clawddnewydd =

Village in Denbighshire, Wales

Coordinates: 53.061°N 3.368°W

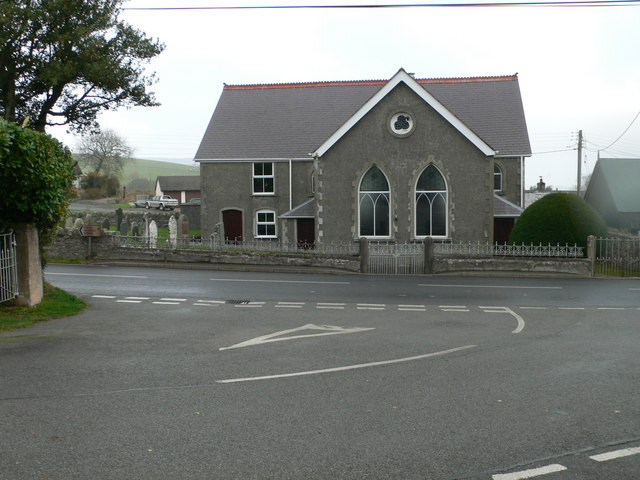
- Clawddnewydd Chapel

- Location within Denbighshire
- OS grid reference: SJ083524
  - Cardiff: 109.6 mi (176.4 km)
  - London: 174.1 mi (280.2 km)
- Community: Derwen
- Principal area: Denbighshire
- Country: Wales
- Sovereign state: United Kingdom
- Post town: RUTHIN
- Postcode district: LL15
- Dialling code: 01824
- Police: North Wales
- Fire: North Wales
- Ambulance: Welsh
- UK Parliament: Bangor Aberconwy
- Senedd Cymru – Welsh Parliament: Clwyd West

Clawddnewydd is a village in the community of Derwen, Denbighshire.

The village has a community centre (Canolfan Cae Cymro), a shop (Siop y Fro) and a pub (Glan Llyn), all owned and run by the villagers.

The Clawddnewydd telephone exchange in the village used to have its own area code (08245) until numbers were changed and it became part of the new Ruthin area code (01824). The exchange now services Ruthin area numbers beginning 750 (i.e. 01824 750 XXX), which includes the community of Llanelidan on the other side of the A494 road.

== Clawddnewydd FC ==
Clawddnewydd Football Club was founded in 1999, after the Cae Cymro Community Centre was built, and play at the pitch (also named Cae Cymro) adjoining the community centre. They play in the Llandyrnog and District Summer League, and won the league title in 2007 and 2009.

The club colours are yellow and black.

The club's catchment area includes Clawddnewydd, Clocaenog, Derwen and parts of Bryn Saith Marchog, Cyffylliog, Efenechtyd and Llanfwrog. Since 2024 they have also been allowed players from Betws Gwerfil Goch and Melin-y-Wig, and up to four players from the Gwyddelwern area. This is one of the largest catchment areas of all clubs in the league.
