= Denbigh railway station =

Former railway station in Denbighshire, Wales

Coordinates: 53.1876°N 3.4122°W

Denbigh

General information
- Location: Denbigh, Wales
- Platforms: 2

Other information
- Status: Disused

History
- Original company: Vale of Clwyd Railway
- Pre-grouping: London and North Western Railway
- Post-grouping: London, Midland and Scottish Railway; London Midland Region of British Railways

Key dates
- 5 October 1858: first (temporary) station opened
- December 1860: Opened
- 30 April 1962: Closed
- 4 May 1964: closed for goods
- 1965: line closed
Location

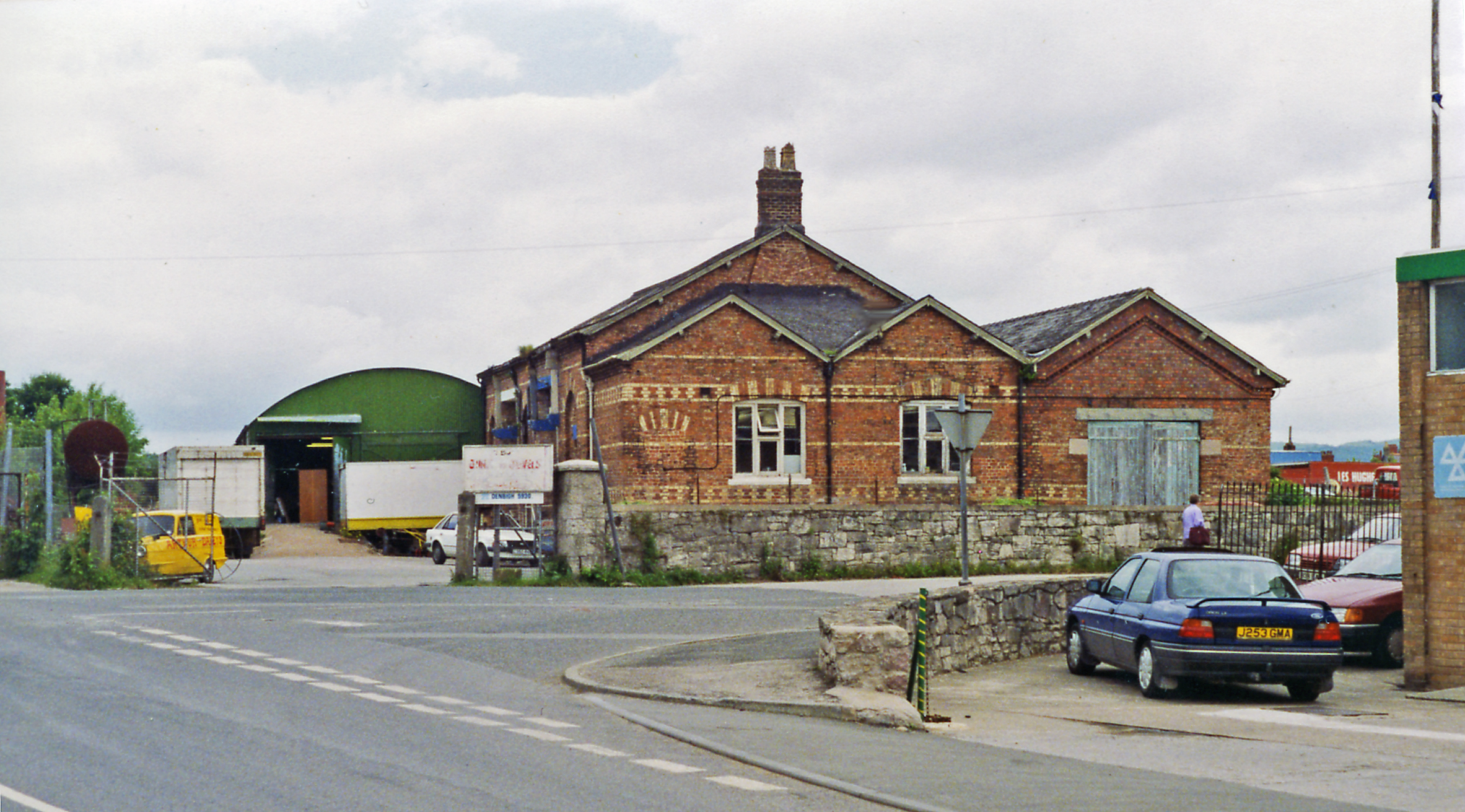
Goods shed before demolition

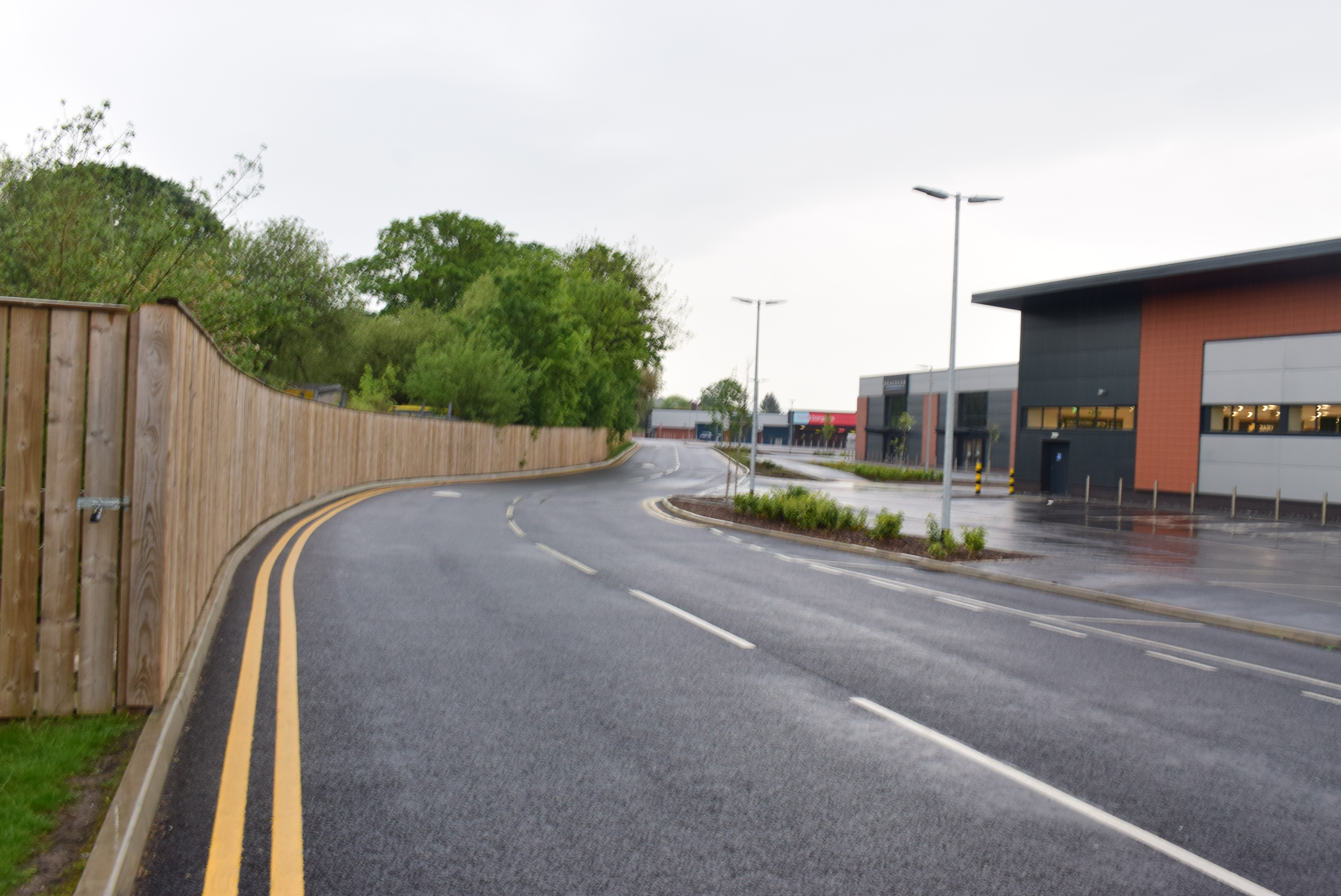
The Denbigh station site in 2018, now occupied by retail units

Denbigh railway station served the town of Denbigh in Wales. It closed in 1962. The only remains of the station are sections of platform edge.

The Vale of Clwyd Railway had used a temporary stop at Denbigh from 1858 until their station buildings, which also housed their headquarters, were constructed. The station was designed, along with several other stations on the line, by the local firm of Lloyd Williams and Underwood. It opened in December 1860 and was for some time the terminus of the railway, until the line extension to Ruthin opened in 1862.

The Tudor Gothic-style station building, which incorporated accommodation on the first-floor for the station master, primarily used limestone, with detailing such as around the doors, windows and chimneys being of freestone. The booking and left luggage offices were placed centrally, and there were three waiting rooms - a general room, one for ladies travelling first-class and another for those ladies travelling second-class. There was an initially single platform, partly sheltered by a roof supported by cast iron columns. That platform was then extended in 1885 and altered also to allow trains to stop regardless of their direction of travel.

Preceding station	Disused railways	Following station
Terminus	London and North Western Railway; Denbigh, Ruthin and Corwen Railway	Llanrhaiadr
Bodfari	Mold and Denbigh Junction Railway	Terminus
Trefnant	London and North Western Railway; Vale of Clwyd Railway	Terminus
