= St Mary's Church, Derwen =

Coordinates: 53.0455°N 3.3882°W

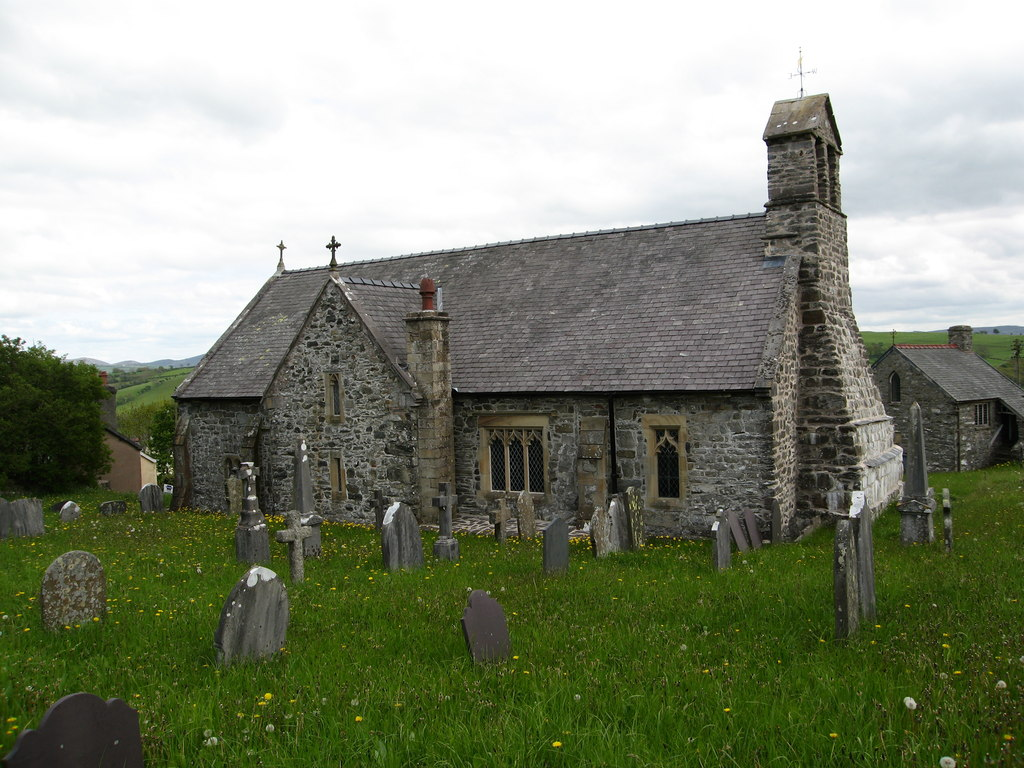
- St Mary's Church, Derwen

- Location in Denbighshire
- OS grid reference: NZ 274 513
- Location: Derwen, Denbighshire
- Country: Wales
- Denomination: Church in Wales
- Website: Friends of Friendless Churches

Architecture
- Functional status: Redundant
- Heritage designation: Grade I
- Designated: 19 July 1966
- Architect: Henry Kennedy (restoration)
- Architectural type: Church
- Style: Gothic
- Groundbreaking: 13th century
- Closed: 1988–99

Specifications
- Materials: Body of church gritstone, porch shale, roof slate

St Mary's Church, Derwen, is a redundant church in the centre of the village of Derwen, Denbighshire, Wales. It is designated by Cadw as a Grade I listed building, and is under the care of the Friends of Friendless Churches. The churchyard contains Derwen Cross, an important medieval sculpture, which is listed at Grade II* and a Scheduled Ancient Monument.

== History ==
The structure of the present church is thought to originate from the 13th century, although because the churchyard is round in shape, it is likely that there had been an earlier church on the site. Additions and modifications were made during the following centuries. Dating from the pre-Reformation period are the east window, the roof and the rood screen. The bellcote is dated 1688. The church was restored in 1857 by Henry Kennedy at a cost of about £750 (equivalent to £73,000 in 2025); the restoration included removal of the west gallery. Encaustic tiles were laid in the sanctuary in 1907. The church was closed for worship in 1998–99, and was taken into the care of the charity, the Friends of Friendless Churches, in 2000–01. The charity holds a lease for 999 years with effect from 1 December 2002.

== Architecture ==
=== Structure ===
The body of the church is constructed in local gritstone, the porch is in shale, and the roof is of slate with a tile ridge. Its plan consists of a nave and chancel without any external distinction, a south porch, and a short north transept that was initially the stairway leading to the loft of the rood screen, and used later as a chimney. At the west end is a bellcote with a weathervane. On the gables to the north and east are crosses acting as finials, and supporting the west wall is a large buttress. The east window has five wide lights and is Perpendicular in style. In the south wall of the chancel is a three-light window and in the north wall is a small two-light window. All the other windows date from the 19th century. The single bell is dated 1751.

=== Fittings and furniture ===
The floor of the nave is flagged, the chancel has a wood-block floor, and the sanctuary has encaustic tiles. The outstanding feature of the interior is the rood screen which has retained its loft. It is finely carved with Perpendicular features. The font is dated 1665. The rest of the furniture dates from the 19th century. This includes a large, carved, octagonal pulpit, an oak altar, and an octagonal font. The stained glass in the south chancel window was designed by H. E. Wooldridge and made by James Powell and Sons; it is dated 1869 and depicts the Nativity, the Resurrection and the Ascension.

== Derwen Cross ==
A mid- to late-fifteenth century cross stands in the churchyard. It is almost 4.6 metres (15 ft) tall and consists of an oblong head on an octagonal shaft, itself resting on a pedestal and a plinth of two steps. The cross is decorated in the Gothic style; the shaft with bosses in the form of crowned heads and foliage, and the head with niches with ogee-arched canopies. The north and south sides of the head have single niches, and the east and west side double niches.

The niches contain weathered figurative sculptures. The sculptures have been interpreted as repsenting on the north side the Virgin and Child; on the east the Coronation of the Virgin or God the Father sat in glory; on the south either Justice or an angel with scales, possibly St Michael at the Last Judgment; and on the west the Crucifixion of Jesus with Mary and St John the Apostle.

The cross is listed Grade II* and is a Scheduled Ancient Monument.

Also in the churchyard is a sundial dating from the 18th or 19th century. The sundial is in bronze, has retained its gnomon, and stands on a limestone pillar. It is listed at Grade II.

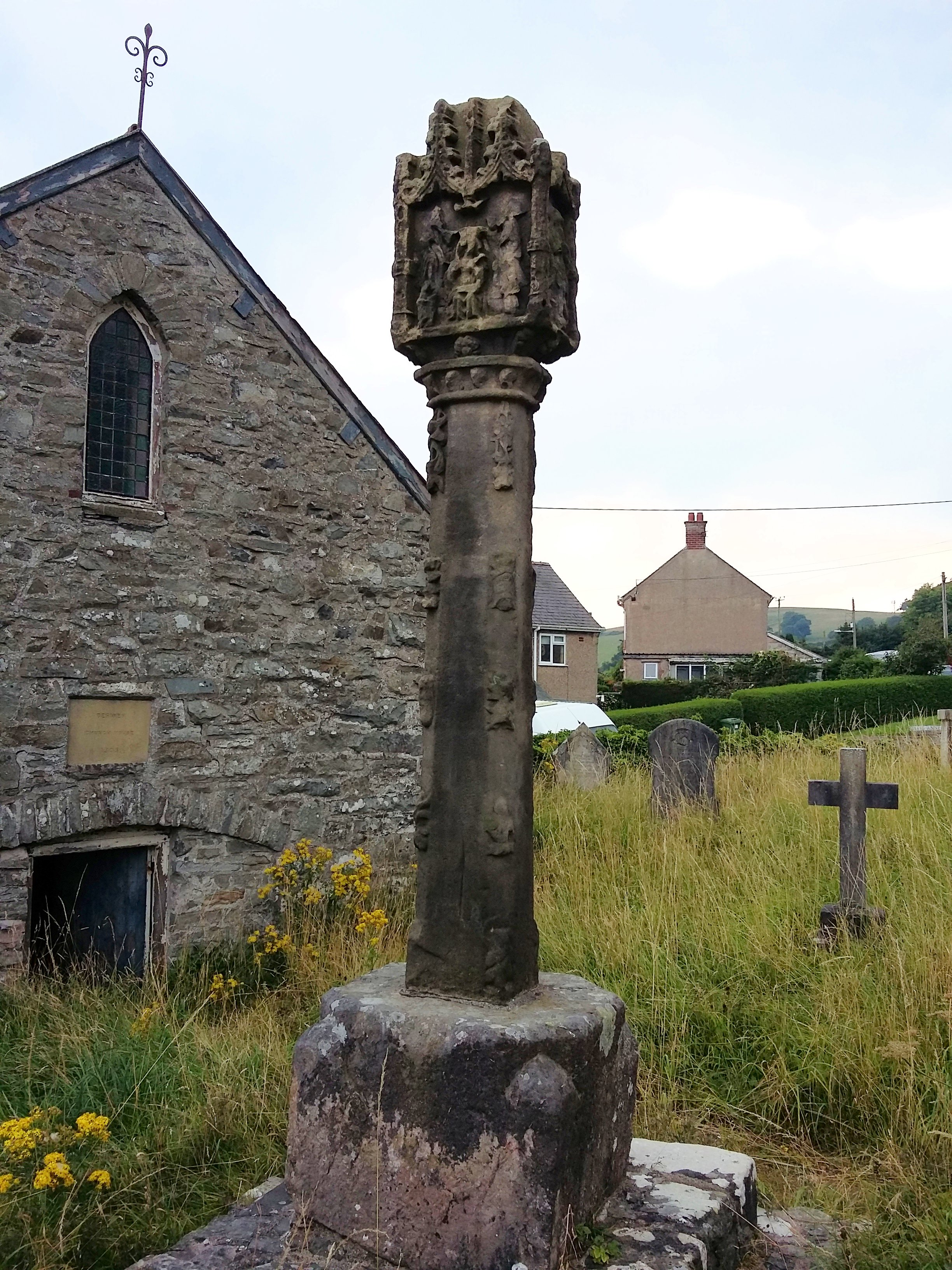
Derwen Cross, with the church behind

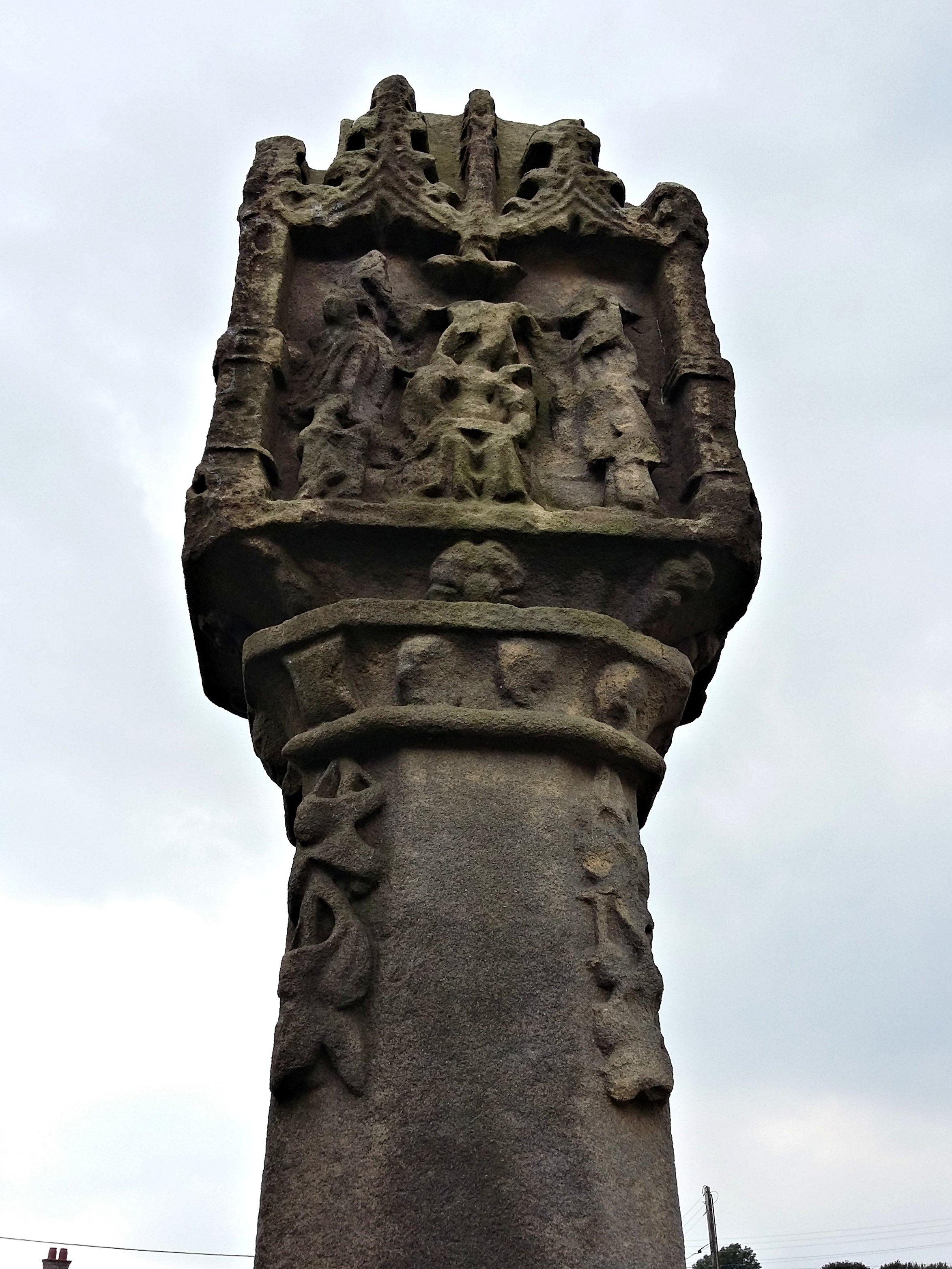
Detail of the east side of the cross head

== Church House ==
On the west side of the churchyard is a building known as Church House. This dates from the 17th century or earlier. It has two storeys, with large openings to the north and south in the ground floor, now walled up. It is likely that this was a hearse house or a lych gate. The upper storey is approached by external stairs, and was originally a parish room or a vestry. It was restored and re-roofed in 1905, and is listed at Grade II.

== Critique ==
The church is listed by Cadw at Grade I because of its "possessing an exceptionally complete rood screen and loft and otherwise retaining much of its mediaeval character". The architectural historian Edward Hubbard states "the church indeed enjoys the rare good fortune of having a rood screen which retains its loft". Of the churchyard cross, the Royal Commission on the Ancient and Historical Monuments of Wales in 1911 described it as "a monument especially worthy of preservation", and the Cadw listing describes it as "a fine example of late pre-Reformation stonecarving".
