= Gellifor =

Village in Denbighshire, Wales

Coordinates: 53.152°N 3.313°W

- Gellifor village entrance from the north

- Location within Denbighshire
- OS grid reference: SJ122624
- Community: Llangynhafal
- Principal area: Denbighshire
- Country: Wales
- Sovereign state: United Kingdom
- Post town: RUTHIN
- Postcode district: LL15
- Dialling code: 01824
- Police: North Wales
- Fire: North Wales
- Ambulance: Welsh
- UK Parliament: Clwyd East
- Senedd Cymru – Welsh Parliament: Clwyd West

Gellifor is a small village in the Vale of Clwyd, Wales. Located at the foot of the Clwydian Range, in the community of Llangynhafal, it is a largely residential settlement. Community facilities are limited but include a primary school and a chapel. The last shop and post office closed around 2000, and residents rely on the towns of Ruthin and Denbigh for access to many services. The population is over 200.
