= Llangynhafal =

Village in Denbighshire, Wales

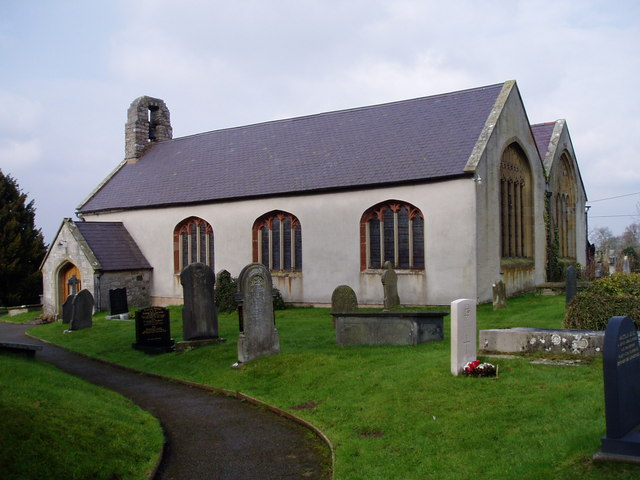
- St Cynhafal's Church

- Location within Denbighshire
- Population: 634 (2011)
- OS grid reference: SJ129635
  - Cardiff: 116.3 mi (187.2 km)
  - London: 176.2 mi (283.6 km)
- Community: Llangynhafal
- Principal area: Denbighshire
- Country: Wales
- Sovereign state: United Kingdom
- Post town: RUTHIN
- Postcode district: LL15
- Post town: DENBIGH
- Postcode district: LL16
- Dialling code: 01824
- Police: North Wales
- Fire: North Wales
- Ambulance: Welsh
- UK Parliament: Clwyd East
- Senedd Cymru – Welsh Parliament: Clwyd West
- List of places UK Wales Denbighshire 53.161°N 3.303°W Map of the community

Llangynhafal is a village and community to the north of Ruthin, in Denbighshire, North Wales. The community includes the village of Gellifor. Llangynhafal is approximately four miles away from Ruthin and six miles away from Denbigh. The name Llangynhafal is thought to originate from the 7th century missionary Saint Cynhafal, who was the son of Saint Elgin ap Cadfarch, rather than from the popular but inaccurate "hundred apples" legend.

== St Cynhafal's Church ==
Llangynhafal Church - St Cynhafal's Church - was built in the 15th century, with earlier origins and significant later additions and restorations. The site itself is believed to have been a place of worship since the 7th century. located on the hillside behind Plas Dolben, Ffynnon Cynhafal is a historic holy well associated with Saint Cynhafal. The site has long been part of local religious and folk traditions. According to local accounts, the well's water was once used for baptisms and was also believed to possess healing properties, particularly for treating warts. Visitors would prick the affected area with a pin and then drop it in the water, and give a short prayer.

== Local amenities and community life ==
Llangynhafal is located at the foot of Moel Famau, the highest hill in the Clwydian Range of north east Wales, standing at 554 metres (1,818 feet) above sea level. The Clwydian Range is an Area of outstanding Beauty (AONB). Moel Famau brings lots of walkers to the village.

Llangynhafal is the home to the Golden Lion Inn, a long established pub that caters to both residents and visitors, including walkers exploring the nearby hills.

Llangynhafal is also home to two Georgian sister country houses Plas Draw and Wern Fawr. Plas Draw is a grade II listed building, the house was the principle gentry house in Llangynhafal. It was built in the C1600 and extensively extended in the following centuries. It is a Georgian 3 by 3 house (with the lower floor having four floor to ceiling windows - two either side of the front door). Wern Fawr was originally built as a farmhouse the residents of Plas Draw - Thos & Judith Davies in 1799. It is a 3 by 3 Georgian style house with sash windows, similar to Plas Draw. Wern Fawn stands further up Moel Famau, also east facing, and is visible from Ruthin. Wern Fawr has been made into a holiday let business by the current owner, it brings many people to the area, sleeping up to 12-14 people

== Llangynhafal FC ==
Llangynhafal Football Club plays in the Llandyrnog & District Summer League. They originally played in the Ruthin Summer League, until the league folded in 1956. In 1966 they joined the Llandyrnog league but left in 1978. They then rejoined in 1987. In 1992 they merged with Llanbedr.

The club colours are orange and black.

The club has won the league in 1997, 1998, 2001, 2019 and 2026.

They currently play outside of the village, at the Rhewl playing fields.

Professional footballer Charlie Caton formerly played for the club.
