= St Cynhafal's Church, Llangynhafal =

Coordinates: 53.1606°N 3.298°W

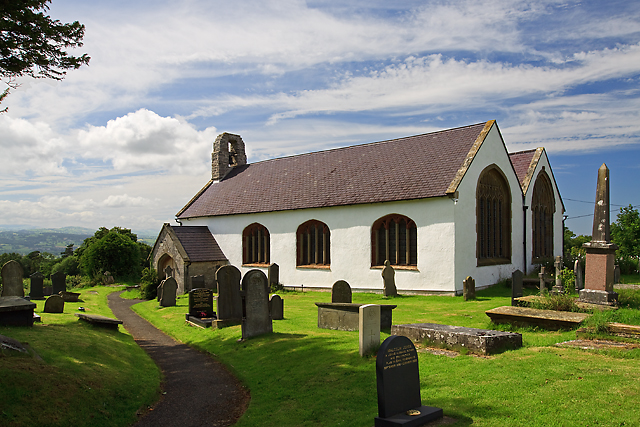
- Double nave and bellcote

- Location in Denbighshire
- OS grid reference: SJ 133 634
- Location: Llangynhafal, Ruthin, Denbighshire
- Country: Wales
- Denomination: Church in Wales

History
- Dedication: Saint Cynhafal

Architecture
- Functional status: Active
- Heritage designation: Grade I
- Designated: 19 July 1966
- Architectural type: Church
- Groundbreaking: 13th century with earlier origins/later additions

Specifications
- Materials: Body of church: rubble Roof: slate

Administration
- Diocese: St Asaph
- Archdeaconry: St Asaph
- Deanery: Dyffryn Clwyd
- Parish: Mission Area of Dyffryn Clwyd

St Cynhafal's Church is a small, isolated church east of the scattered village of Llangynhafal in Denbighshire, Wales. Its only immediate neighbour is the former rectory, Plas-yn-llan, birthplace of the Rev. Robert Jones, friend of William Wordsworth and where Wordsworth stayed in the 1790s. The church is dedicated to Saint Cynhafal, a 7th-century monk, and is the only such dedication in the United Kingdom. Although with earlier origins, the present church dates to the 13th century, and was largely rebuilt in the 15th. It remains an active church in the Diocese of St Asaph and is a Grade I listed building.

== History ==
The Church of St Cynhafal stands in an isolated position to the east of the scattered village of Llangynhafal, five miles south-east of Denbigh. It is dedicated to Saint Cynhafal, a 7th-century monk, and is the only such dedication in Britain. Cadw suggests that the dedication references the site of a monastic cell. The current church dates from the 15th century. In the late 18th century the adjacent house, Plas-yn-llan, was the rectory and the Rev. Robert Jones (1769–1835) was born there. He was a close friend of William Wordsworth, who stayed at Plas-yn-llan during the summer of 1791 and again in August and September 1793. The church was restored in the mid-19th century at a cost of £1400.

St Cynhafal's remains an active parish church in the Diocese of St Asaph and occasional services are held.

== Architecture ==
The church is built to a double-nave plan, with a south porch and a bellcote. The architectural historian Edward Hubbard, in his 2003 Clwyd volume of the Pevsner Buildings of Wales, notes that the church was whitewashed in the 19th century and rendered in the 20th. (Note: During their survey, carried out in 1996, the Clwyd-Powys Archaeological Trust (CPAT) noted that the rendering made the identification of an accurate building sequence impossible.) The building materials are limestone and Welsh slate for the roof. The Royal Commission on the Ancient and Historical Monuments of Wales (RCAHMW) records the carved reredos, with an effigy of a pelican. Hubbard notes the traditional 17th century dating for this, but suggests a possible later date. St Cynhafal's is a Grade I listed building.

== Gallery ==
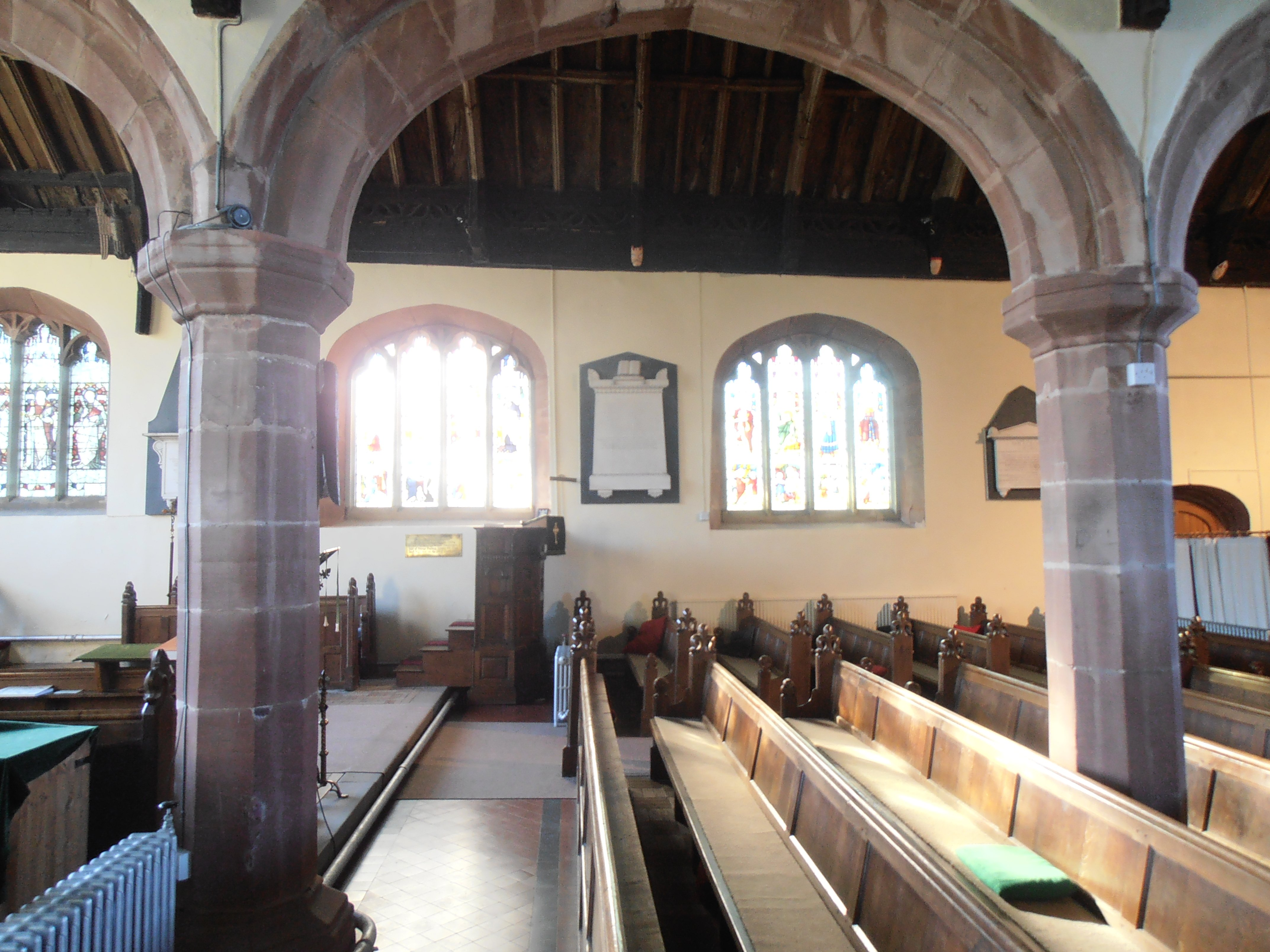
The interior

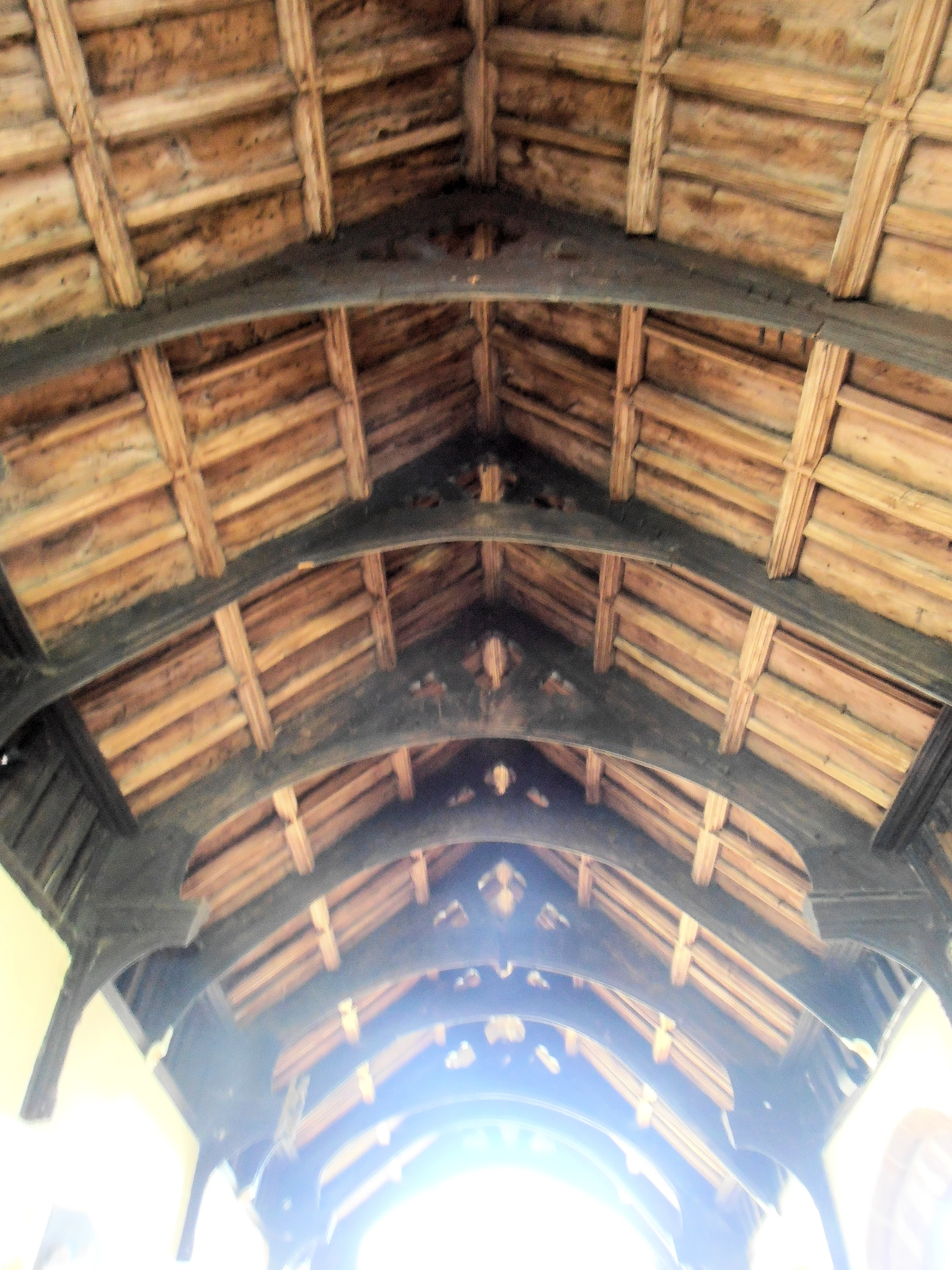
The roof

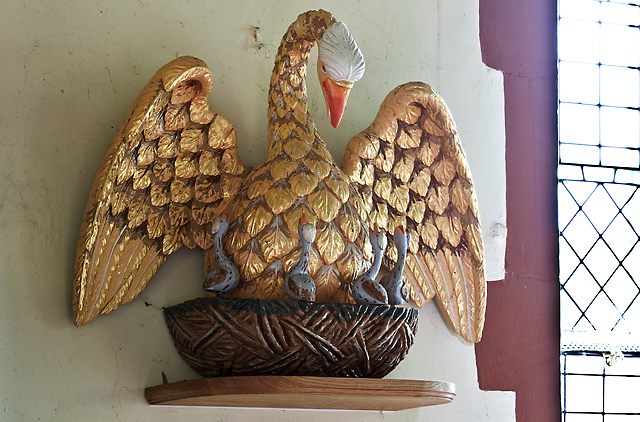
Pelican in piety

== Sources ==
- Hubbard, Edward (2003). Clwyd (Denbighshire and Flintshire). The Buildings of Wales. New Haven and London: Yale University Press. ISBN 978-0-300-09627-9. OCLC 315792534.
