= Derwen =

Village in Denbighshire, Wales

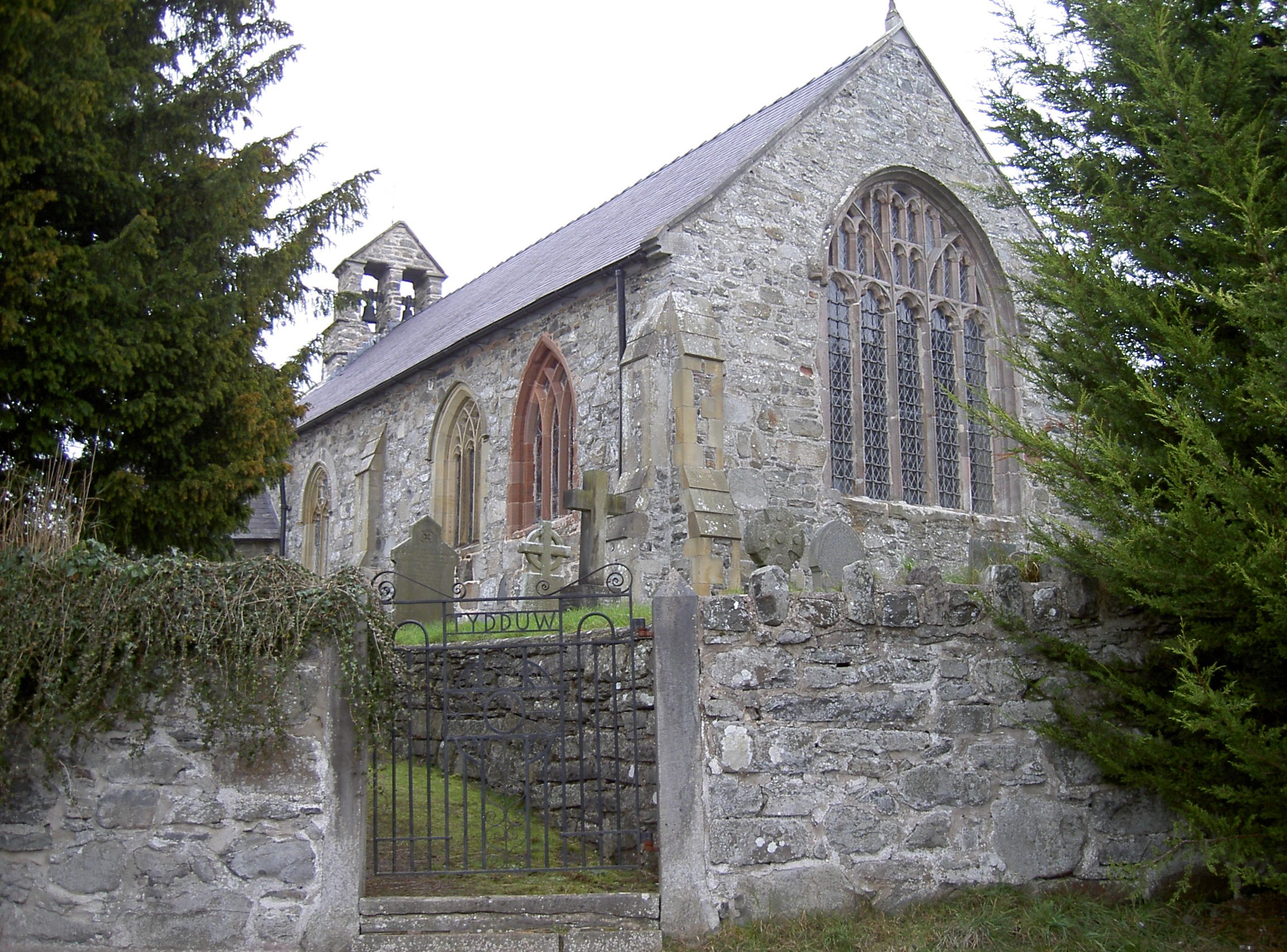
- St Mary's church, Derwen

- Location within Denbighshire
- Population: 426 (2011)
- OS grid reference: SJ069506
- Community: Derwen
- Principal area: Denbighshire
- Country: Wales
- Sovereign state: United Kingdom
- Post town: RUTHIN
- Postcode district: LL15
- Post town: CORWEN
- Postcode district: LL21
- Dialling code: 01824
- Police: North Wales
- Fire: North Wales
- Ambulance: Welsh
- UK Parliament: Bangor Aberconwy
- Senedd Cymru – Welsh Parliament: Clwyd West
- List of places UK Wales Denbighshire 53.045°N 3.388°W Map of the community

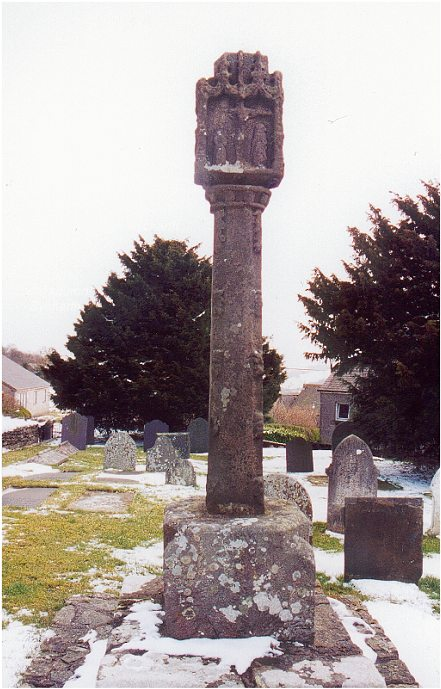
Derwen's Celtic Cross

Derwen (historically, Derwen-dêg-fawr) is a rural village in the south of Denbighshire, Wales. It lies approximately halfway between Corwen and Ruthin, in the upper part of Dyffryn Clwyd on the north side of the River Clwyd, opposite the village of Bryn Saith Marchog. The population of the community as taken at the 2011 census was 426.

The community includes the village of Clawddnewydd.

An old Celtic Cross stands in the village, near the church, dating from the Early Middle Ages. There is also the Grade II Ffynnon Sara.

== Notable residents ==
- William Jones (Ehedydd Iâl) (1815-1899), poet and hymnist
- Charles Evans (mountaineer) (1918–1995)
- Eric Jones (climber) (1836-), lived in the village as a child and attended the village school

== See also ==
- St Mary's Church, Derwen
