= Denbigh, Ruthin and Corwen Railway =

Former British railway company

The Denbigh, Ruthin and Corwen Railway was a standard gauge railway line that connected Corwen with Denbigh via Ruthin in North Wales.

The line was promoted independently as part of the rivalry between the London and North Western Railway and the Great Western Railway for access to Rhyl. It opened in stages from 1862 to 1865, and was worked by the LNWR, and vested in that company in 1879.

The line was never busy, serving a rural community, and it was closed to passenger traffic in 1962, and completely in 1965.

== Conception ==
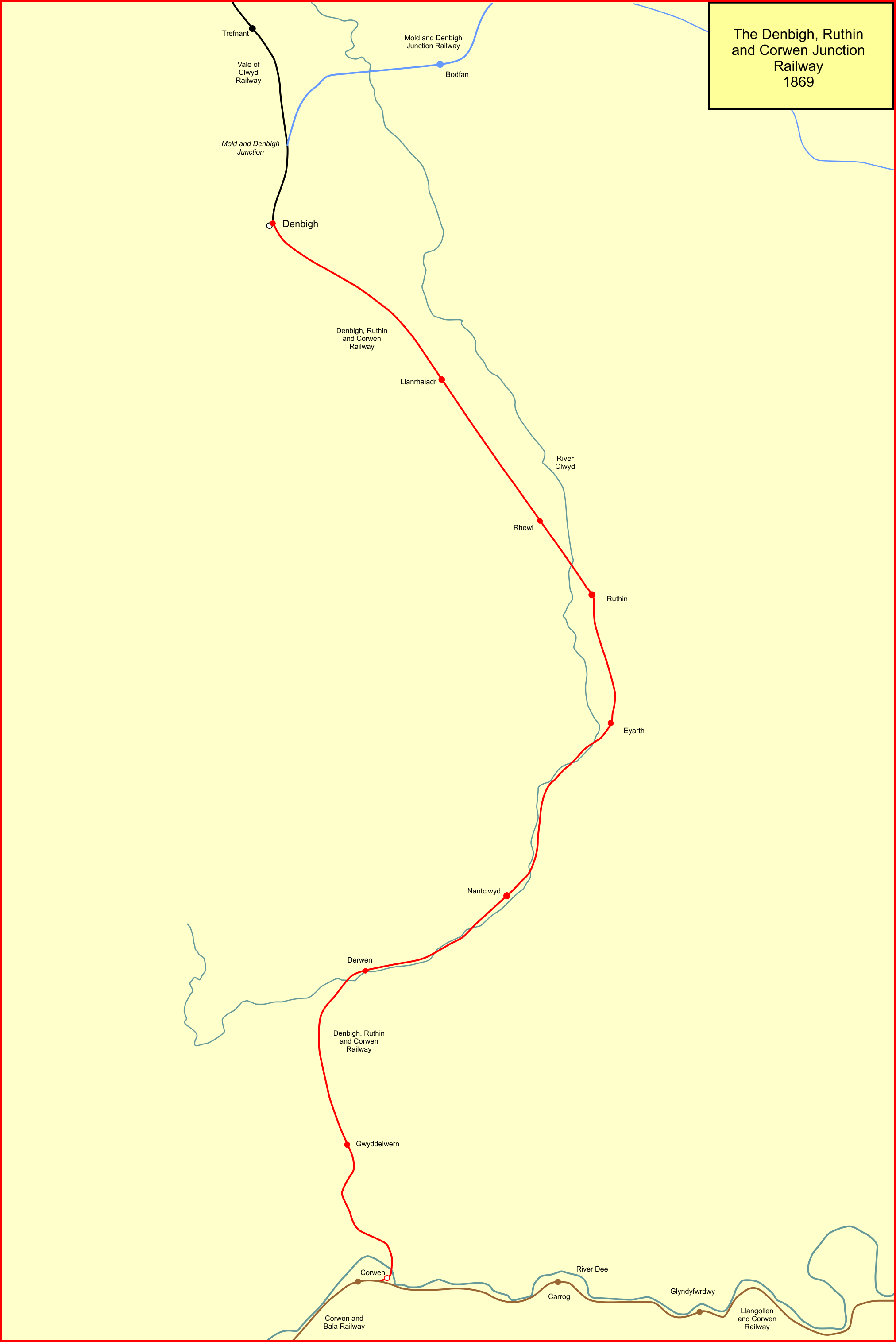
The Denbigh, Ruthin and Corwen Junction Railway

The Chester and Holyhead Railway completed its main line in 1850, transforming the transport environment in North Wales; however its main focus at opening was the Irish Mail traffic rather than local traffic. It allied itself with routes to London via Crewe, and shortly merged with other lines to form the London and North Western Railway, in 1858.

The Shrewsbury and Chester Railway had already opened in 1848; it was not aligned to larger lines at first, but in time it became aligned to the Great Western Railway, so that the two railways were in competition.

Denbigh was an important regional centre, and in 1856 the Vale of Clwyd Railway was authorised by the Vale of Clwyd Railway Act 1856 (19 & 20 Vict. c. xlv) to build from Rhyl to Denbigh. Relations with the LNWR at Rhyl were not completely cordial.

Denbigh, Ruthin and Corwen Railway Act 1860
- Act of Parliament
- Parliament of the United Kingdom
- Long title: An Act for making a Railway from the Vale of Clwyd Railway at Denbigh in the County of Denbigh to Corwen in the County of Merioneth, to be called "The Denbigh, Ruthin, and Corwen Railway."
- Citation: 23 & 24 Vict. c. clxiv

Dates
- Royal assent: 23 July 1860

Text of statute as originally enacted

On 1 August 1859 the Vale of Llangollen Railway was authorised by the Vale of Llangollen Railway Act 1859 (22 & 23 Vict. c. lxiv) to build from a junction south of Ruabon, on the Shrewsbury and Chester line, now in the control of the Great Western Railway. This branch was definitely in the GWR camp, and the GWR was attracted by the possibility of reaching Rhyl. If the gap between Llangollen and Denbigh could be closed, the GWR would achieve its aim; the LNWR made efforts to frustrate that ambition. The following year two ostensibly independent lines were authorised, the Llangollen and Corwen Railway by the Llangollen and Corwen Railway Act 1860 (23 & 24 Vict. c. clxxxviii) and, on 23 July 1860, the Denbigh, Ruthin and Corwen Railway by the Denbigh, Ruthin and Corwen Railway Act 1860 (23 & 24 Vict. c. clxiv).

== Opening, in stages ==
Raising the capital to construct the line proved difficult, and in the end the contractors David Davies and Thomas Savin formed a partnership and funded nearly all of the cost. The two men fell out and Davies severed his active involvements with the company, leaving Savin to control progress. He became the dominant force on the board.

Part of the line opened, from Denbigh to Ruthin on 1 March 1862; there were two intermediate stations in the seven-mile line, at Llanrhaiadr and Rhewl.

Savin was now totally in control; continuation of the construction to Gwyddelwern was authorised by the Board of Trade inspecting officer, Captain Tyler, and opening was planned for 12 May 1863, but that was delayed. Savin feared absorption of the company by the LNWR, and this did not suit his business interests: he wished to play the LNWR off against the GWR. Because of negotiations over the matter, it was not until 6 October 1864 that the line was opened throughout to Corwen. Even now this was only to a temporary station, a little short of Corwen on the Llangollen and Corwen Railway, which had become a satellite of the GWR. The actual connection to the GWR line opened nearly a year later, on 1 September 1865, when that company's station was ready.

In fact GWR priorities changed, and the company lost interest in reaching Rhyl; the DR&CR turned to the LNWR camp, and its line was worked by the LNWR; the arrangement was authorised by the London and North Western Railway (Additional Powers) Act 1863 (26 & 27 Vict. c. ccxvii).

== Finance, and lease to the LNWR ==
Savin was negotiating a lease of the line to the LNWR, but this was broken off in October 1864, and the LNWR were unco-operative about continuing the working arrangement. From 1 August 1865 Savin worked the line using hired locomotives, but Savin himself became bankrupt and the DR&CR board took control and worked the line directly.

Rolling stock hired in from the Cambrian Railways was used, but a dispute with that company over payment of hire charges resulted in a rupture with them. The DR&CR went into receivership by 1866, but the company freed itself from that condition by 1871. A closer relationship with the LNWR was formalised from July 1878, and full vesting with the LNWR was authorised by the London and North-western Railway (Denbigh, Ruthin, and Corwen Railway Vesting) Act 1879 (42 & 43 Vict. c. cxv) of 3 July 1879.

== 1895 passenger train service, and later ==
Bradshaw's Guide shows the 1895 service: there were four trains throughout the line on weekdays, with two additional trains (three on Saturdays) between Denbigh and Ruthin. All the trains called at all stations.

There were three goods trains on the line daily in the 1920s, but this seems to have been exceptional; one a day normally sufficed later.

== Closure ==
Passenger business on the line had always been light, and had declined in the 1930s. After 1945 carryings were so low that it was obvious that the future was bleak, and the ordinary passenger service over the Ruthin to Corwen part of the line was closed on 2 February 1953; however in the summer months a periodical Land Cruise train traversed the line as part of a circular tour. A passenger service from Denbigh to Ruthin continued, as the final part of a service from Chester via Mold.

On 30 April 1962 the remaining passenger service ceased, as did the ordinary goods service to Ruthin; the line closed completely on 1 March 1965.

== Future ==
In February 2020 Brian Jones, a local councillor and lead member for transport at Denbighshire Council, stated he hoped the line can obtain some of the UK Government's £500m fund for reversing the 1960s Beeching cuts. The site of Denbigh railway station is now occupied by a retail park, but the former Corwen railway station remains intact as retail premises. The rail union RMT has however called the government fund a "drop in the ocean". A new railway station opened in Corwen in 2023 as part of the extension of the heritage Llangollen Railway.

== Station list ==
- Denbigh; Vale of Clwyd Railway station, opened December 1860; closed 30 April 1962; later excursions used the station;
- Llanrhaiadr; opened 1 March 1862; closed 2 February 1953;
- Rhewl; opened 1 March 1862; closed 30 April 1962;
- Ruthin; opened 1 March 1862; closed 30 April 1962;
- Eyarth; opened 6 October 1864; closed 2 February 1953;
- Nantclwyd; opened 6 October 1864; closed 2 February 1953;
- Derwen; opened 6 October 1864; closed 2 February 1953;
- Gwyddelwern; opened 6 October 1864; closed 2 February 1953;
- Corwen; temporary station opened 6 October 1864; transferred to another Corwen station late in 1865;
- Corwen opened 8 May 1865; closed 14 December 1964.
