= Llanfair Dyffryn Clwyd =

Village in Denbighshire, Wales

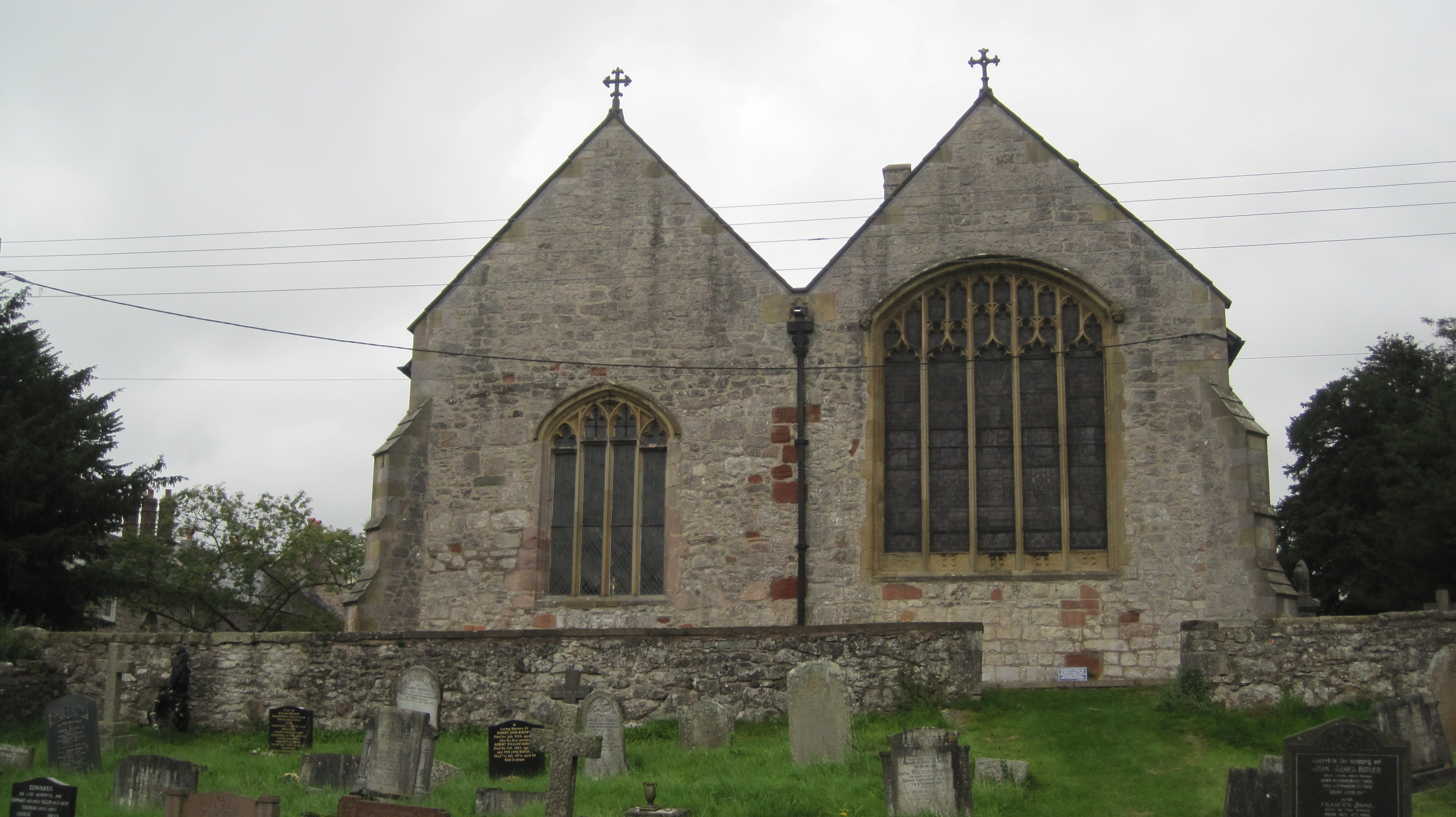
- Church of St. Mary and St. Cynfarch

- Location within Denbighshire
- Population: 1,053 (2011)
- OS grid reference: SJ133554
- Community: Llanfair Dyffryn Clwyd
- Principal area: Denbighshire
- Country: Wales
- Sovereign state: United Kingdom
- Post town: RUTHIN
- Postcode district: LL15
- Dialling code: 01824
- Police: North Wales
- Fire: North Wales
- Ambulance: Welsh
- UK Parliament: Clwyd East
- Senedd Cymru – Welsh Parliament: Clwyd West
- List of places UK Wales Denbighshire 53.089°N 3.294°W Map of the community

Llanfair Dyffryn Clwyd is a village and community in Denbighshire, Wales, situated in the Vale of Clwyd about one mile south of the town of Ruthin. In the 2001 census, it had 1048 residents and 50.6% of them could speak Welsh. The figures for the 2011 census were: population 1,053; Welsh speakers 46.9%. The age group with the highest percentage of Welsh speakers was the 15-year-olds, all of whom could speak it. The villages of Pentrecelyn and Graig Fechan are located in the community.

== Church of St. Mary and St. Cynfarch ==
The church of St. Mary in the Vale of Clwyd – in Welsh Llanfair Dyffryn Clwyd – shares its dedication with "Saint" Cynfarch, apparently a Celtic chieftain from northern Britain, related to Coel Hen or "Old King Cole". It is a large 15th century double-naved church with an impressive tower. It also shares its churchyard with massive yew trees, the stump of a preaching cross, a Georgian vestry house and a timbered lychgate inscribed "Heb Dduw, Heb Ddim" (Without God, Without Anything).

Though the interior is much restored, medieval features remain. Both roofs have carved "canopies of honour" over their east ends – a distinctive local feature – and part of the medieval rood screen still stands in the south aisle. Beside the altar, and perhaps two centuries older than this woodwork, lies a monument to an early 14th-century Welsh knight, David ap Madoc: it depicts his hand clutching his sword, and a cat-like lion on his flowery shield. The most outstanding medieval survival is the mosaic of stained glass (dated 1503) in a south window, including figures of saints and the feet of Christ pierced by a huge golden nail. According to tradition, this glass was once in the big window above the altar, and was preserved from destruction during the Civil War by being buried in the mighty iron-bound oak chest which stands below its present position. There is more medieval glass in the window by the font, near the Elizabethan memorial to Thomas ap Rice, who died "at cock-crow" on a Sunday in 1582. The church is generally open during daylight hours.

== Notable buildings ==
Four estates lie close to the village:

=== Eyarth Hall and Eyarth House ===
Eyarth Hall, dating from the 16th century and with additions and alterations in the following three centuries, is a Grade II listed building. Its garden is listed Grade II on the Cadw/ICOMOS Register of Parks and Gardens of Special Historic Interest in Wales. Eyarth House, to the north of the hall and to the south-west of the village, is also listed at Grade II, and its garden is similarly listed. In the Victorian era the Eyarth estate and the village were served by the Eyarth railway station which was closed in 1951.

=== Garthgynan ===
Garthgynan, to the east of the village and dating from the 17th century, is listed at Grade II*. Its garden is listed Grade II on the Cadw/ICOMOS register.

=== Plas Newydd ===
Plas Newydd, to the north-east of the village and dating from the 17th century, is listed at Grade II, as is its garden.

== Governance ==
The community falls in Llanfair Dyffryn Clwyd/Gwyddelwern electoral ward of Denbighshire County Council. This ward has a total population of 2,227 taken at the 2011 census.
