= Rhewl, Llanynys =

Village in Denbighshire, Wales

Coordinates: 53.133°N 3.333°W

Rhewl
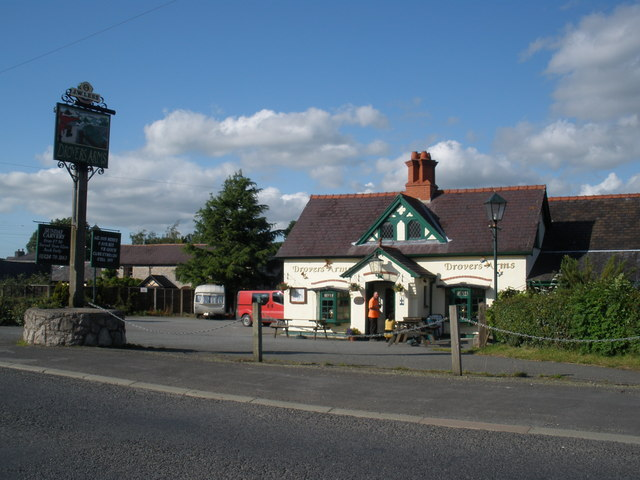
- The Drovers Arms public house, Rhewl

- Location within Denbighshire
- OS grid reference: SJ108604
- Community: Llanynys
- Principal area: Denbighshire
- Country: Wales
- Sovereign state: United Kingdom
- Post town: RUTHIN
- Postcode district: LL15
- Dialling code: 01824
- Police: North Wales
- Fire: North Wales
- Ambulance: Welsh
- UK Parliament: Clwyd East
- Senedd Cymru – Welsh Parliament: Vale of Clwyd

Rhewl is a village on the A525 between Ruthin and Denbigh in the county of Denbighshire in Wales. The village is beside the River Clywedog, which is bridged by the A525.

The village is notable for its football club, Rhewl F.C. Rhewl primary school was scheduled to be shut down in 2005, but protests by local newspapers and parents of the pupils saved the school from being closed. The village holds an annual Family Fun Day with live music, hog roast, displays and many more attractions. The village is also noted for the Drovers Arms public house and Lady Bagot's Drive, a picturesque two mile walk up the River Clywedog that was originally laid as a carriageway by Lord Bagot for his wife in Edwardian times to traverse between Rhewl and Bontuchel. Parts of the drive are privately owned.

Rhewl railway station was on the line opened by the Denbigh, Ruthin and Corwen Railway and closed in 1962, three years before the line's closure. The station's main building is still in existence. Rhewl was to have another station on the narrow gauge Ruthin and Cerrig-y-Drudion Railway but construction was aborted after 8 km of earthworks had been built from Ruthin to a point just west of Bontuchel. The route was abandoned in 1884.
