= Pont y Ddraig =

Bridge across River Clwyd, Wales

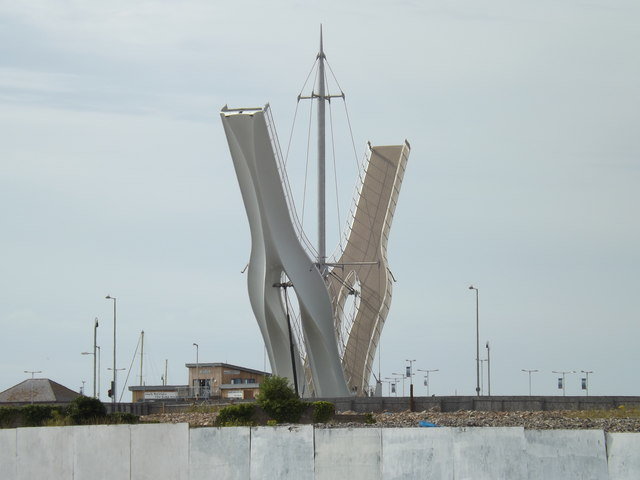
Pont y Ddraig

Pont y Ddraig or Dragon's Bridge is a bridge for pedestrians and cyclists across the Foryd Estuary of the River Clwyd next to Rhyl harbour in Wales. The bridge was opened in October 2013 by Mark Colbourne, gold and silver medalist at the London Paralympics. The length of the bridge is 32 metres, and it rises for boats with tall masts. The cost of its construction was £4.3 million.
