= Llanynys =

Hamlet in Denbighshire, Wales

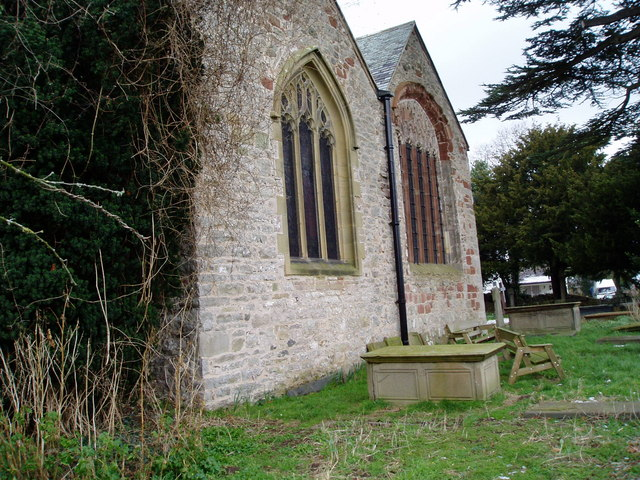
- St Saeran's Church, Llanynys, a Grade I Listed Building

- Location within Denbighshire
- Population: 762 (2011)
- OS grid reference: SJ101627
- Community: Llanynys
- Principal area: Denbighshire
- Country: Wales
- Sovereign state: United Kingdom
- Post town: RUTHIN
- Postcode district: LL15
- Post town: DENBIGH
- Postcode district: LL16
- Dialling code: 01824
- Police: North Wales
- Fire: North Wales
- Ambulance: Welsh
- UK Parliament: Clwyd East
- Senedd Cymru – Welsh Parliament: Vale of Clwyd
- List of places UK Wales Denbighshire 53.154°N 3.344°W Map of the community

Llanynys (Welsh: [ɬanˈənɪs]) is a hamlet and community (Llanynys and Rhewl Community Council) in Denbighshire, north-east Wales; (OS grid reference: SJ1062). It lies in the Vale of Clwyd, a few miles north of Ruthin, and includes the village of Rhewl.

The community population at the 2011 census was 762; a 2.8% fall since the 784 people noted in 2001. The 2011 census showed 47.8% of the population could speak Welsh, a fall from 52.9% in 2001.

The local church, St Saeran's, was built in the 13th century on the site of a 6th-century monastery; Saeran was a bishop-saint. It is situated on a small rise between the winding Clwyd and Clywedog rivers, hence the name ynys (island).

== Bachymbyd Fawr ==
South of the village, on the Ruthin to Denbigh road, stands Bachymbyd Fawr, an ancestral home of the Salusbury family. Prominent landowners and politicians in the 16th and 17th centuries, the Salesburys served as members of parliament for Denbighshire and Denbigh Boroughs and as High Sheriffs for the county. Bachymbyd is a Grade II* listed building. Its gardens and landscaped park are listed at Grade II on the Cadw/ICOMOS Register of Parks and Gardens of Special Historic Interest in Wales.
