= Grade I listed buildings in Denbighshire =

Denbighshire shown within Wales

In the United Kingdom, the term listed building refers to a building or other structure officially designated as being of special architectural, historical, or cultural significance; Grade I structures are those considered to be "buildings of exceptional interest". Listing was begun by a provision in the Town and Country Planning Act 1947. Once listed, strict limitations are imposed on the modifications allowed to a building's structure or fittings. In Wales, the authority for listing under the Planning (Listed Buildings and Conservation Areas) Act 1990 rests with Cadw.

== Buildings ==
Name	Location Grid Ref. (Note: Sometimes known as OSGB36, the grid reference is based on the British national grid reference system used by the Ordnance Survey.) Geo-coordinates	Date Listed	Function	Notes	Reference Number	Image
Plas Uchaf	Cynwyd; SJ0531642722; 52°58′25″N 3°24′41″W	4 June 1952	House	Located off the W side of a lane which runs N from Cynwyd to Melin Rug. The front faces S, the ground sloping downhill to the E.	663	See more images
Rhug Chapel	Corwen; SJ0649543889; 52°59′03″N 3°23′39″W	20 October 1966	Chapel	Built in 1637 as a private chapel.	671	See more images
Llangar Church	Llangar, Cynwyd; SJ0635442452; 52°58′16″N 3°23′45″W	20 October 1966	Church	In a rural location on the E banks of the River Dee, and set down from B4401. The church is set in a large churchyard, the stone boundary wall probably C18, and with many contemporary table tombs.	704	See more images
St Mary's Church	Derwen; SJ0703150728; 53°02′45″N 3°23′18″W	19 July 1966	Church	At the centre of the village of Derwen.	725	See more images
St Garmon's Church	Llanarmon-yn-Iâl; SJ1907556158; 53°05′47″N 3°12′36″W	19 July 1966	Church	Situated in the centre of Llanarmon village.	735	See more images
St Meugan's Church	Llanrhydd; SJ1400257761; 53°06′36″N 3°17′10″W	19 July 1966	Church	Located at the southern boundary of the community, some 1.5km SW of Llanbedr village and approximately 1.5km E of Ruthin; set within its own raised and partly revetted churchyard, with a particularly good series of C18 and C19 monuments.	739	See more images
St Cynhafal's Church	Llangynhafal; SJ1331363400; 53°09′38″N 3°17′53″W	19 July 1966	Church	Reached by a minor road east of Llangynhafal. The churchyard is circular, considerably raised above road level on the west, and partly surrounded by a rubble stone wall. War memorial set in west wall of churchyard. Iron gates; winding path from west.	786	See more images
St Dyfnog's Church	Llanrhaeadr-yng-Nghinmeirch; SJ0816763375; 53°09′34″N 3°22′30″W	19 July 1966	Church	Picturesquely-sited in the village centre, set back from the road within its own walled churchyard.	792	See more images
St Saeran's Church	Llanynys; SJ1031962672; 53°09′13″N 3°20′33″W	19 July 1966	Church	Located in the centre of the small village of Llanynys towards the north-eastern boundary of the community.	808	See more images
Ruthin Castle	Ruthin; SJ1233558051; 53°06′45″N 3°18′40″W	24 October 1950	Castle	Situated on a rise at the S end of the town, the entrance drive continuing S from Castle Street.	825	See more images
Nantclwyd y Dre (Nantclwyd House)	Ruthin; SJ1236158185; 53°06′49″N 3°18′39″W	24 October 1950	House	Situated in a block of buildings in Castle Street.	833	See more images
St Peter's Church	Ruthin; SJ1236258376; 53°06′55″N 3°18′39″W	24 October 1950	Church	Located off the N side of St Peter's Square, in the centre of Ruthin.	905	See more images
St Marcella's Church	Denbigh; SJ0713866233; 53°11′06″N 3°23′28″W	24 October 1950	Church	Located in open countryside within Denbigh Green, approximately 1.6km SE of Denbigh; within its own rubble-walled churchyard. Also known as Whitchurch.	952	See more images
Town Wall, including North-East, Countess and Goblin Towers	Denbigh; SJ0524465805; 53°10′51″N 3°25′10″W	24 October 1950	Town wall	Defining the Old Town boundary in a long arc to the E of the castle and rising dramatically at the top of a wooded, craggy hill-slope.	954	See more images
Denbigh Castle	Denbigh; SJ0516365811; 53°10′51″N 3°25′14″W	2 February 1981	Castle	Prominently-sited at the southern end of the Old Town, with commanding views over the Vale of Clwyd.	968	See more images
St Hilary's Chapel	Denbigh; SJ0521165903; 53°10′54″N 3°25′11″W	24 October 1950	Church tower	Located within the walls of the old town immediately N of and below the castle.	969	See more images
Leicester's Church (Remains)	Denbigh; SJ0529365952; 53°10′56″N 3°25′07″W	24 October 1950	Church (ruined)	Located within the old walled town on Castle Hill, some 50m NE of the tower of St Hilary's Church.	970	See more images
Burgess Gate	Denbigh; SJ0515465995; 53°10′57″N 3°25′15″W	2 February 1981	Gate	On the northern side of the Old Town of Denbigh, at the lower end of the street.	1020	See more images
Foxhall Newydd	Henllan; SJ0298367518; 53°11′45″N 3°27′13″W	24 October 1950	Country House	Located at the southern edge of Foxhall Woods, some 250m W of Foxhall and 1km SE of Henllan; accessed via a track running W from Foxhall.	1055	See more images
Llangollen Bridge	Llangollen; SJ2151142167; 52°58′16″N 3°10′13″W	24 April 1951	Bridge	Spans the River Dee at the N end of the main street.	1080	See more images
St Collen’s Church	Llangollen; SJ2167241976; 52°58′10″N 3°10′04″W	24 April 1951	Church	Towards the edge of the town centre.	1164	See more images
Trevor Hall	Llangollen; SJ2563242295; 52°58′22″N 3°06′32″W	7 June 1952	Hall	Set in a wooded hillside location overlooking its own parkland and the eastern end of the vale of Llangollen.	1350	See more images
Bodrhyddan Hall	Rhuddlan; SJ0460278774; 53°17′50″N 3°25′58″W	24 September 1951	Hall	Set in parkland approx. lkm east of Rhuddlan.	1361	See more images
St Asaph Cathedral	St Asaph; SJ0389674310; 53°15′25″N 3°26′31″W	16 November 1962	Cathedral	Situated in the town centre at the top of the hill.	1460	See more images
Rhuddlan Castle	Rhuddlan; SJ0248977913; 53°17′21″N 3°27′51″W	10 November 1994	Castle	Prominently sited on the east bank of the River Clwyd to the SE of the town.	14977	See more images
Pillar of Eliseg	Llantysilio; SJ2026744525; 52°59′32″N 3°11′22″W	7 June 1963	Pillar	The pillar is raised on a tumulus, approximately 50m from the road, and 400m N of Valle Crucis Abbey.	19678	See more images
Valle Crucis Abbey	Llantysilio; SJ2044744139; 52°59′19″N 3°11′12″W	22 April 1998	Abbet (ruined)	The abbey lies in the lower Eglwyseg valley between the main road and the river, approximately 0.9km N of Llangollen.	19693	See more images
Town Wall: Western Section	Denbigh; SJ0508865925; 53°10′55″N 3°25′18″W	27 February 2004	Town Wall	Defining the old Town boundary, running W and S from the Burgess Gate to the site of the Exchequer Tower.	82445	Upload Photo

== See also ==
- Grade II* listed buildings in Denbighshire
- Listed buildings in Wales
