= Dafydd ap Llywelyn ap Madog =

Dafydd ap Llywelyn ap Madog was a 16th-century Welsh poet. He is known to have written a number of cywyddau in praise of St Mordeyrn (as associated with Nantglyn), St Dyfnog, and to God (also attributed to Dafydd ap Hwlcyn ap Madog).
