= Leicester's Church, Denbigh =

Ruined church in Denbigh, Wales

Leicester's Church
- Remains of St David's Church, Denbigh
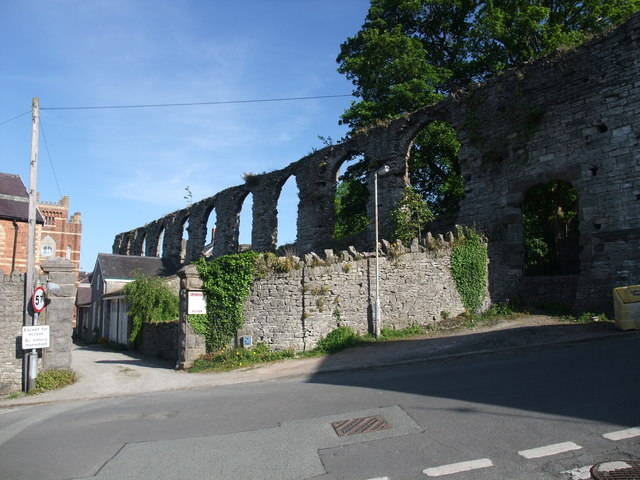

- Location within Denbighshire
- 53.18222°N 3.41864°W
- Type: Church
- Location: Denbigh, Denbighshire

History
- Built: begun in 1578-9, abandoned in 1584
- Built for: Robert Dudley, 1st Earl of Leicester

Site notes
- Governing body: Cadw

Listed Building – Grade I
- Official name: Leicester's Church (Remains)
- Designated: 1950
- Reference no.: 970

Scheduled monument
- Official name: Denbigh, Leicester's Church
- Reference no.: DE044

Leicester's Church, originally known as St David's Church, Denbigh, is a large ruined church near to the hill top castle at Denbigh, North Wales. It was built for Robert Dudley, 1st Earl of Leicester, from 1578, but financial difficulties meant work stopped in 1584. When the Earl died unexpectedly in 1588 the project was abandoned. It had been the only large church-building project in Elizabethan England or Wales. On Robert Dudley's death with no heir, his estates reverted to the Crown, as a roofless enclosed space. It is now a Grade I listed building and Scheduled Ancient Monument, cared for by Cadw, the Welsh historic environment service.

== Standing ruins ==
The ruined church has stood as an empty shell since work ceased in 1584, enclosing a substantial rectangle of 54.9 metres (180 ft) by 22.9 metres (75 ft). Removal of stonework has taken place from the south wall and east gable, whereas the north aisle wall and west end remain at their original full height. 10 bays, with Tudor arched windows, and the remains of Tuscan pillars show this would have been in a Renaissance style, very different from the church gothic style that ceased to be built at the Reformation. Because so few new churches were built in the century following the reformation, Leicester's Church is 'probably the most significant and ambitious example of Protestant church building in the Elizabethan period'.

== Lordship of Denbigh ==
The first Lord of Denbigh was Henry de Lacy, who in 1284 was granted one of a number of Marcher Lordships granted by Edward I as what were in effect personal fiefdoms. Successive lords held the lordship of Denbigh, sometimes bitterly disputed, until, via the Mortimers, it came to be held by Edward of York. When he became King Edward IV in 1461, Denbigh lordship passed back to the crown. Under Tudor reforms of 1535–42, the Marcher Lordships were brought within the kingdom, abolishing their autonomy. The Lordship of Denbigh, although merged with the Crown, retained its own identity, and in 1563, Elizabeth I granted the lordship to Robert Dudley. There was no legal basis for this grant, but his power and status were such that he was able to behave as though he had the same sort of fiefdom as the lords once had. The people of Denbigh did not think well of this arrangement, and some rebellious behaviour resulted. Dudley, in 1564 also made the Earl of Leicester, undertook a number of town improvements to pacify the people of Denbigh. He built a town hall and a market hall, and in 1579 laid the foundation stone of a new church, the first to be built since the reformation.

== Puritan cathedral ==
The Earl of Leicester's plans for his new church were on a grand scale. It was dedicated to St David, and he apparently hoped to make it a new protestant cathedral instead of St Asaph Cathedral. As a proponent of the puritan movement within the English Reformation, he wanted to emphasize preaching as the focus of Anglican services, rather than the celebration of the mass. The wide rectangular preaching house allowed closer proximity to the pulpit, to hear sermons, rather than celebration of the mass at a distant east end altar. The hiatus in church governance, finance and patronage caused by the Reformation meant that from 1536 no significant new church building was undertaken throughout England and Wales for the next 100 years. The attempt by the Earl of Leicester to build such a church stands in isolation as the only example of its kind. The result would have been both liturgically and stylistically very different from the gothic style buildings the Anglican Church took over. Large, Tudor style windows running the length of the nave would have ensured a well lit building. Tuscan columns and Renaissance features would have looked modern and international.

== From construction to ruin ==
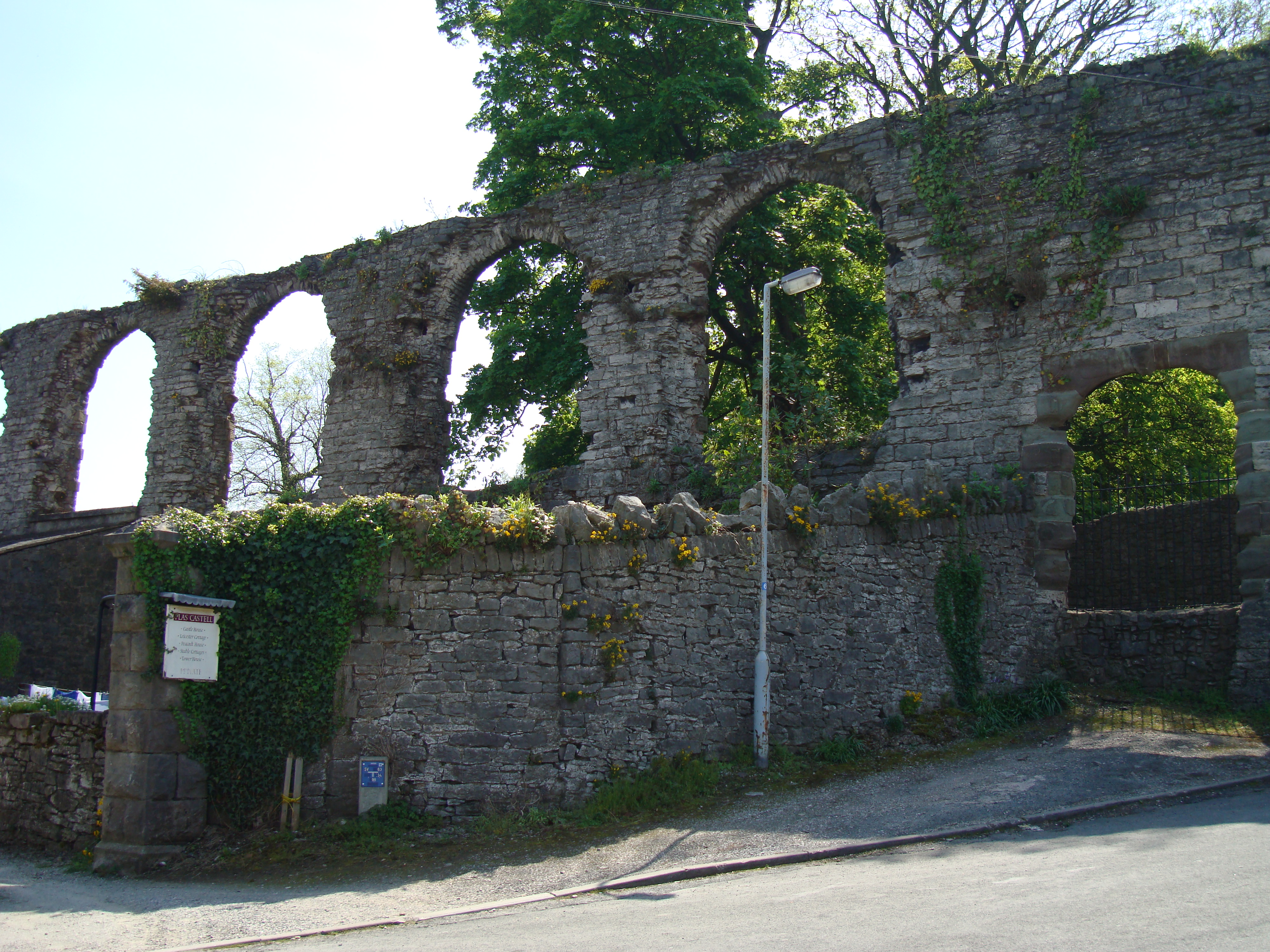
North wall of Leicester's Church, Denbigh

In 1584, five years into the building process, work came to a halt. In the same year his three-year-old son died. The death of his only legitimate child, styled Baron Denbigh, was a dreadful blow both personally and for his dynastic ambitions, as it left him without an heir, with little expectation that his 40 year old wife would have another child. No further work was made on the incomplete Church. The particular problem would appear to be financial. Building a huge stone Church was prohibitively expensive even for an Earl. Whether due to this, or other expenses, the following year Dudley had to mortgage his lordship of Denbigh for £15,000, to pay his debts. Three years after that, in 1588, the Earl of Leicester himself died unexpectedly. With no heir, all his estates and titles reverted to the Crown. Queen Elizabeth I paid off the mortgage on the Denbigh lordship in 1592, but clearly neither she nor anyone else was interested in progressing the building works, and it remained the property of the Crown rather than the local diocese. Instead it was quarried as a supply of stone and other building materials. Even where the walls remain at full height they mostly have gaping unframed windows where the dressed ashlar has been stripped out.

== State protection ==
Map showing locations of Cadw historic properties around Denbigh.

The church stood as an open ruin from then on. Reputedly used for cockfights and even dueling, it has had no formal purpose since. It is designated a Scheduled Ancient Monument and a grade I listed building. Responsibility for its preservation was taken up by the Ministry of Works, and subsequently by Cadw, who gradually acquired a number of properties around the town. Denbigh Castle, 150 metres to the south, was slighted during the English Civil War and the Town Walls run close by the church site. St Hilary's Chapel Tower is 50 yards away, and the Carmelite Denbigh Friary is at the other end of Vale Street. All are in the guardianship of Cadw, who facilitate public access in various ways.

== See also ==
- Grade I listed buildings in Denbighshire
- List of Cadw properties
- List of Scheduled Monuments in Denbighshire
