= Twm o'r Nant =

Welsh dramatist and poet

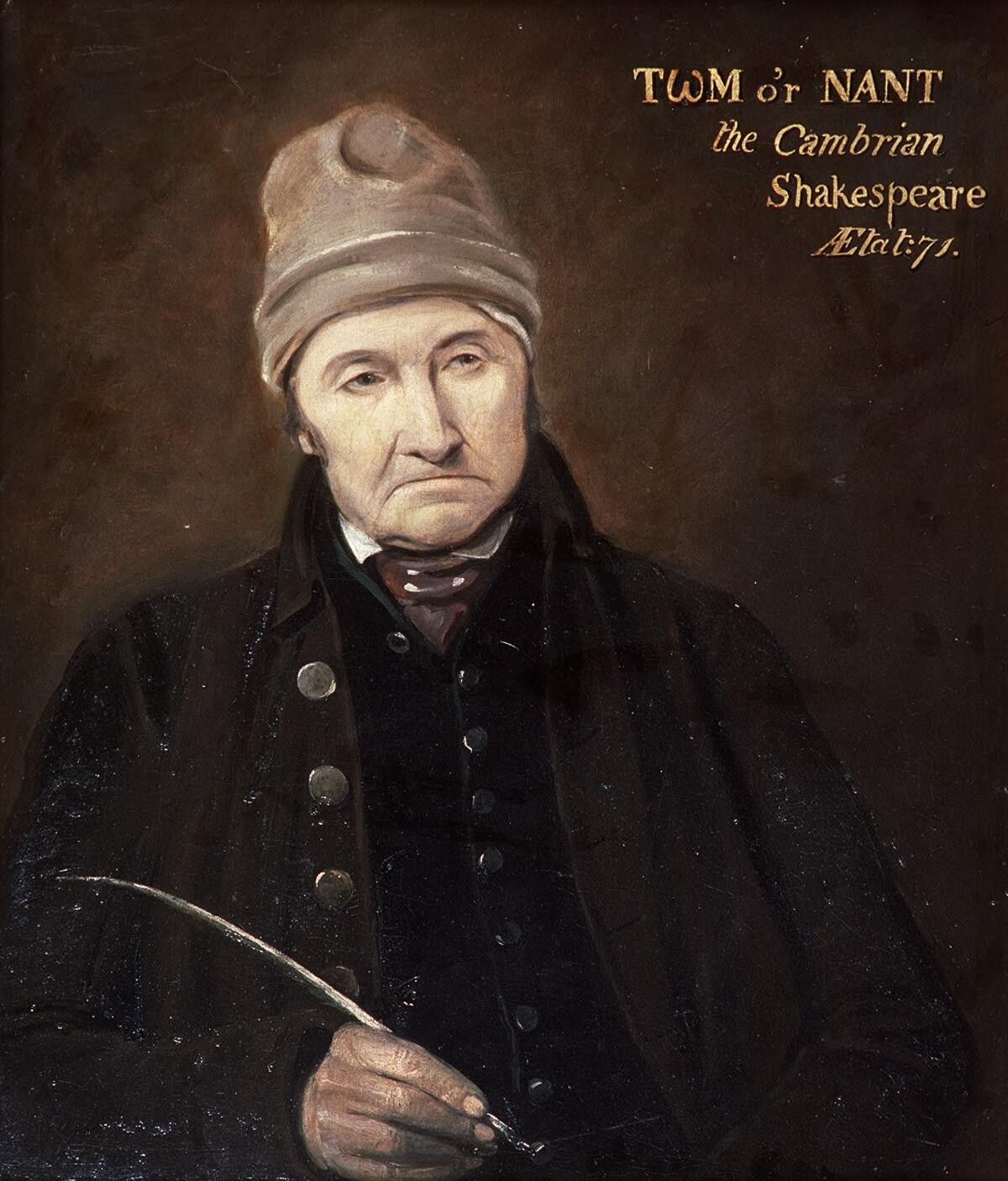
- Born: Thomas Edwards; January 1739; Llannefydd, Denbighshire, Wales
- Died: April 3, 1810 (aged 71)
- Resting place: St Marcella's Church, Denbigh
- Other name: "The Cambrian Shakespeare"

Twm o'r Nant ('Tom from the Brook') was the pseudonym of a Welsh language dramatist and poet, Thomas Edwards (January 1739 – 3 April 1810), also known as Tom of the Dingle. He was famous for anterliwtau (interludes or short plays), which he performed mainly round his native Denbighshire.

== Early life ==
Edwards was born in Llannefydd, Denbighshire (now in Conwy County Borough). As a child, he moved with his parents to Y Nant Isaf (Welsh for 'Lower Brook'), near Nantglyn, from which he took his pseudonym. Edwards had little formal education: he attended one of Griffith Jones's circulating schools, where he learnt to read, and a school in Denbigh for two weeks to learn English. However, he was eager to learn to write – he cadged writing paper and wrote with ink that he made from elderberries.

In 1749 Edwards joined a company of touring actors, which typically performed on an improvised stage such as a cart. He wrote seven interludes before he was 20 years old, but all have been lost.

In 1763 Edwards married Elizabeth Hughes, the wedding being conducted by the poet-priest Evan Evans (Ieuan Fardd). The couple settled in Denbigh, where Edwards worked hauling timber, performing in his interludes throughout North Wales and selling printed copies of them. After financial problems caused by the bankruptcy of an uncle, for whom he had stood surety, Edwards moved to South Wales, where he again worked in timber haulage and for a time kept an inn in Llandeilo. He returned to North Wales in 1786 to resume his performances, and became a stonemason. In 1808 he was working for William Madocks on the construction of the Porthmadog embankment.

== Social comments ==
The interludes Edwards wrote feature social evils of his day. He often notes unpopular taxes, greedy landowners, swindling lawyers and immoral clergymen. They form a link between the medieval and modern traditions of Welsh drama. He also wrote and published ballads, of which about 200 remain, at least in parts. His short autobiography appeared in the periodical Y Greal in 1805.

Edwards took part in the annual eisteddfodau of the Gwyneddigion Society, the precursors of the National Eisteddfod. His failure to win the main prize at the Corwen Eisteddfod in 1789 may have been due to a dispute over an impromptu composition competition with Walter Davies (Gwallter Mechain), in which Edwards was supported by David Samwell (Captain Cook's surgeon). Samwell named Edwards The Cambrian Shakespeare and gave him a silver pen as a consolation prize for having been unfairly beaten. The silver pen remains in the collection of National Museum Wales. Edwards died on 3 April 1810. He was buried at St Marcella's Church, Denbigh, where there is a memorial to him.

== Legacy ==
Edwards's interludes were published after his death: a collection of six appeared with Isaac Foulkes in 1874.

George Borrow devotes two chapters to Edwards in his 1862 travel book Wild Wales: Its People, Language and Scenery. He includes a translation of part of an interlude by Edwards, entitled Riches and Poverty.

In 1974 the Welsh playwright Dedwydd Jones published Bard:A Play on the Life and Times of Twm o'r Nant. This was commissioned for the opening of the Sherman Theatre, Cardiff.
