= All Saints' Church, Llangar =

Church in Denbighshire, Wales

All Saints' Old Parish Church
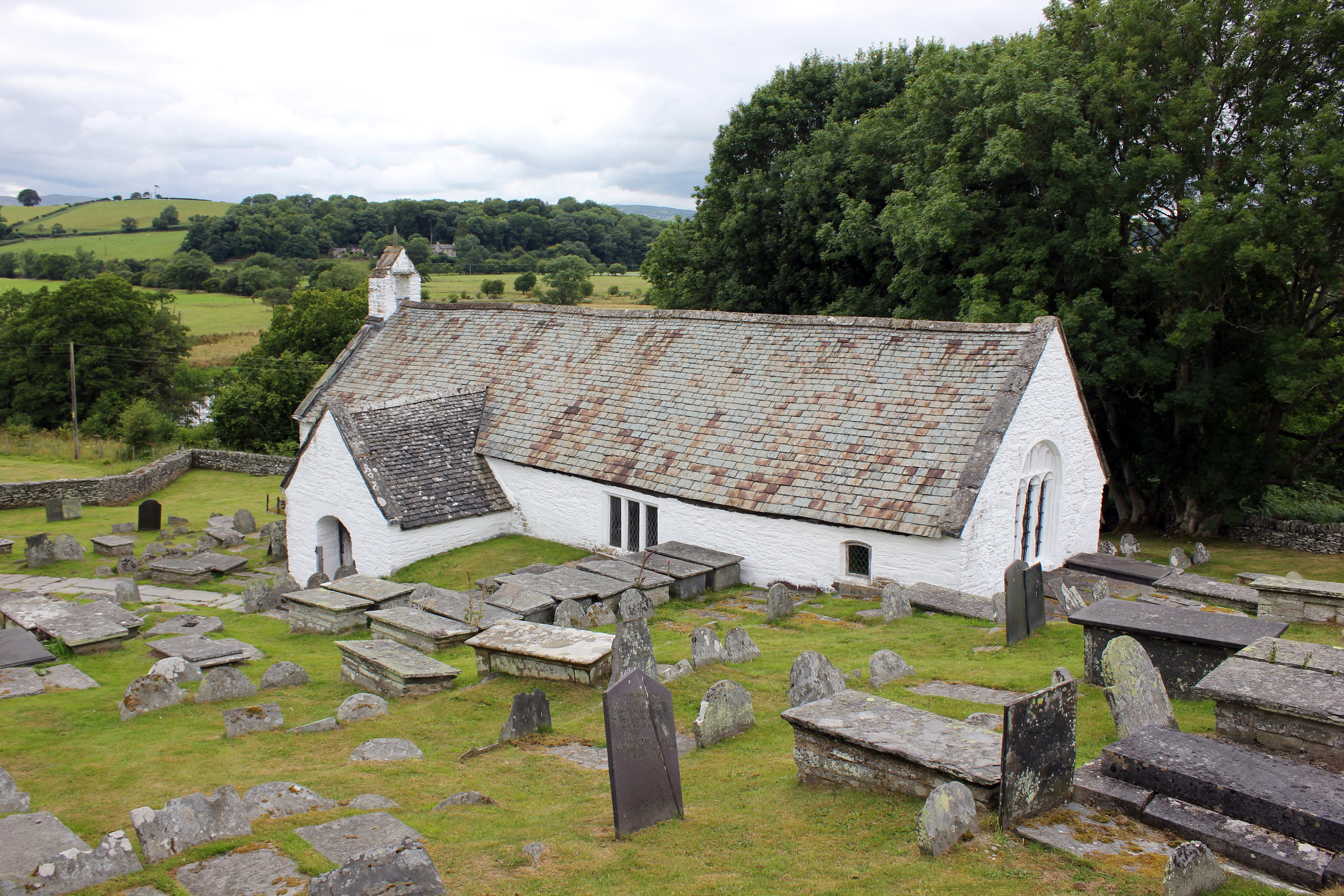

- Location within Denbighshire
- 52.9712°N 3.3959°W
- Type: Church
- Location: Llangar, Cynwyd, Denbighshire

History
- Built: 15th century
- Rebuilt: 18th century

Site notes
- Restored: 1974
- Restored by: R. Shoesmith
- Governing body: Cadw

Listed Building – Grade I
- Official name: Church of All Saints, Cynwyd
- Designated: 1966
- Reference no.: 704

Scheduled monument
- Official name: Llangar Old Parish Church & Churchyard
- Reference no.: ME093

Llangar Church, or All Saints Old Parish Church, Llangar, was formerly the parish church of Llangar with Cynwyd, in the Dee Valley, Denbighshire, North Wales. It is now under the guardianship of Cadw, is a Scheduled Monument, and a grade I Listed Building. It is conserved and open to the public as an example of a rural church with medieval wall paintings and largely intact 18th century interior fittings.

== History ==
Documentary sources show a church at Llangar in 1291, but the present building would appear to date to the 15th century (1971 excavations within the church found this to be the earliest identifiable occupancy). The Church has an undivided nave and chancel, flagstone floor, and arch-braced roof with 15th century roof trusses. The walls have wall paintings, which probably represent at least 8 different layers of painted schemes. The earliest of these date to the 15th century. The extensive woodwork of the interior includes a gallery, box pews, benches and pulpit, all of which date to the early part of the 18th century.

By 1682 the parish was two identifiable townships of Llangar and Cymmer. By 1856 the majority of the population were living even further up that valley, at Cynwyd, and with the church now distant and in poor repair the decision was made to build a new Church, the Church of St John Evangelist, Cynwyd, and abandon the old Church at Llangar, which thus avoided the renovations of the 19th century. The church is now under the guardianship of Cadw, having become very dilapidated in its abandoned state. A major conservation programme was undertaken from 1974.

== Roof timbers ==
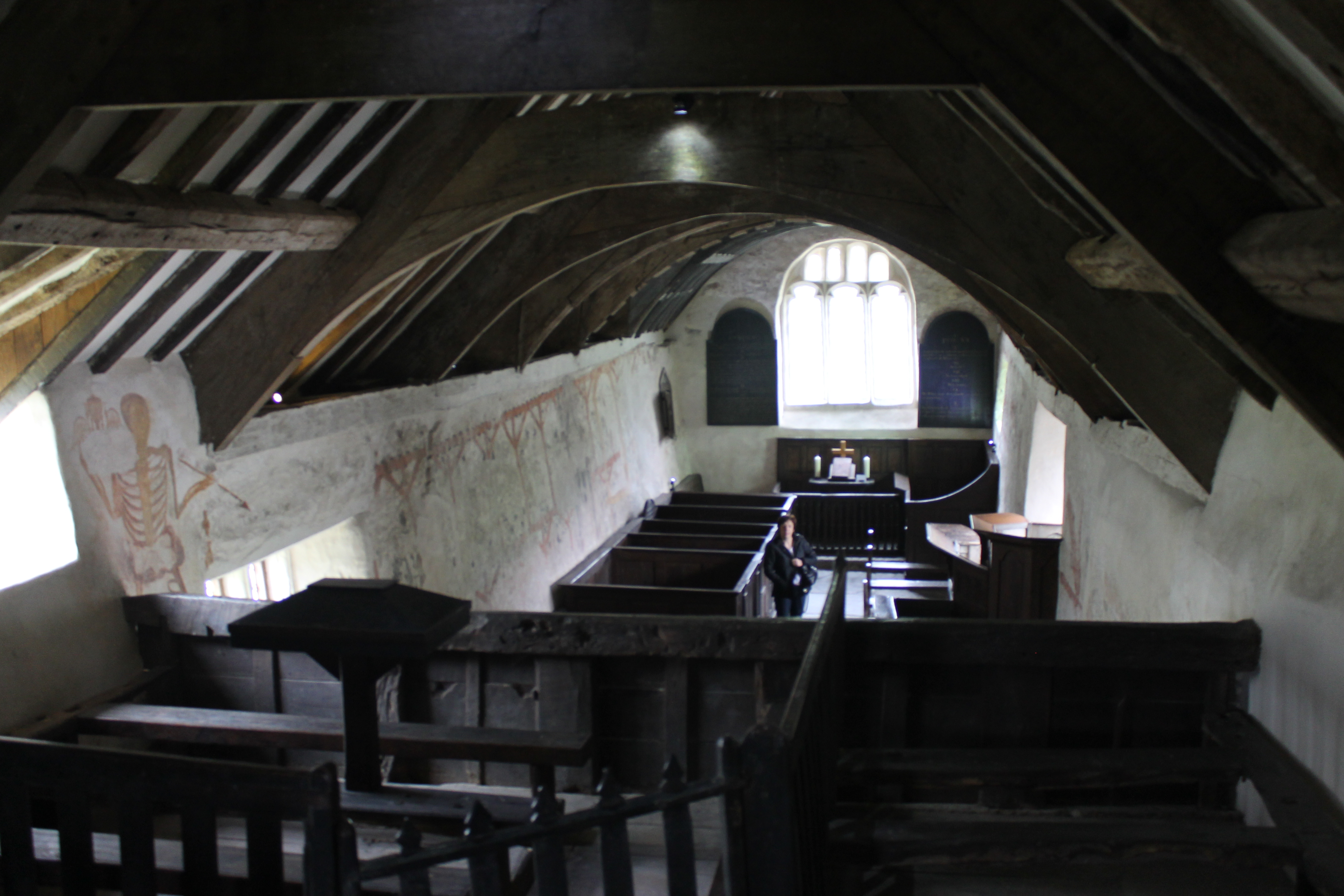
View from the gallery

The oldest roof trusses are four arch-braced roof trusses forming the four bays in the centre of the Church. At the west end, above the gallery, further trusses were altered in the 17th or 18th century and are divided by a collar-beam truss. At the chancel end the roof is panelled over with a barrel shaped ceiling to provide a 'canopy of honour' of 15th century design, although most of the fabric of this is now of later date.

== Internal woodwork ==
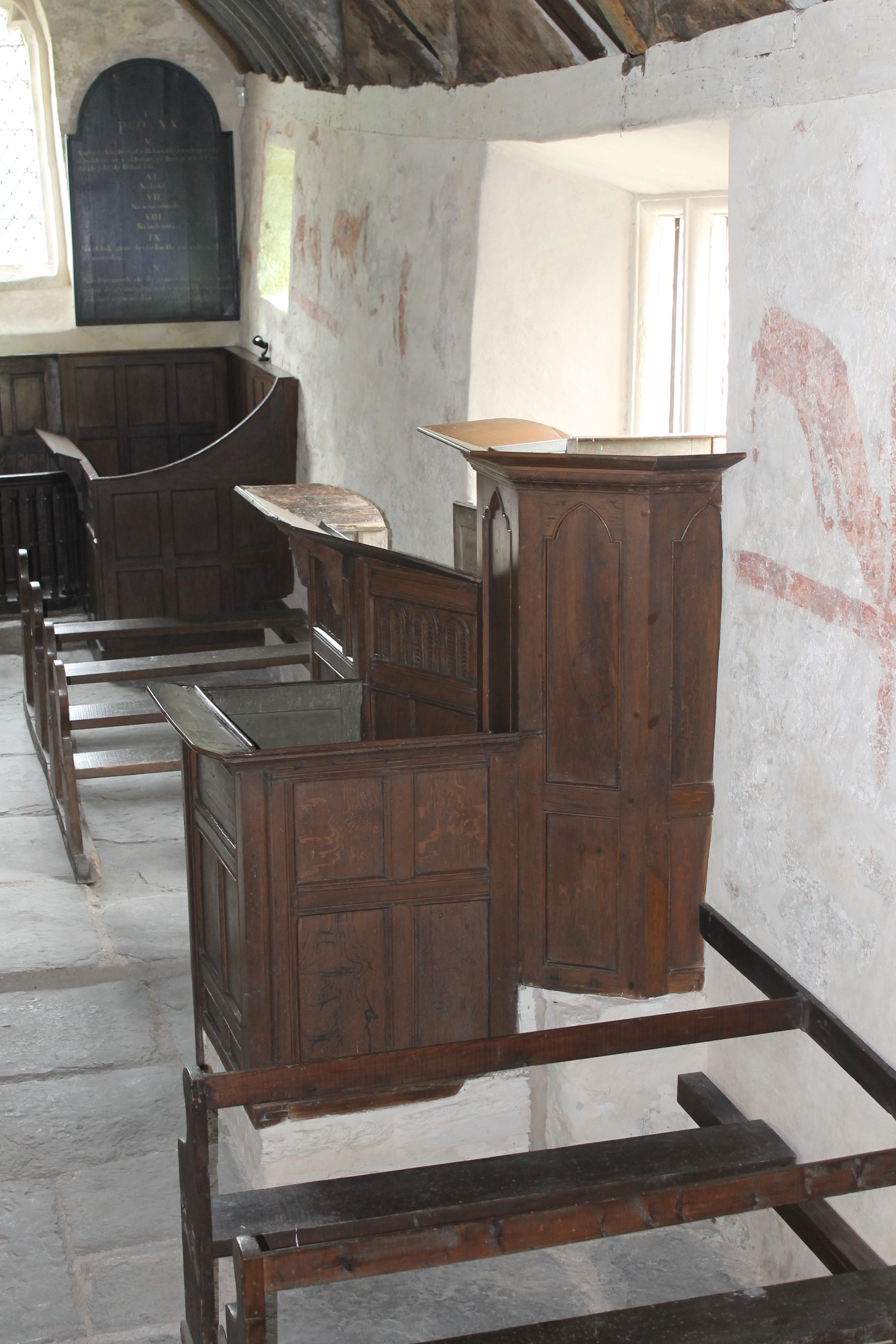
Triple-combination pulpit

The interior of the Church has an extensive range of early eighteenth century wooden fittings, which, because of the subsequent abandonment of the Church, has survived in a largely unaltered state where nineteenth century improvers would have swept them away. There is a large gallery at the west end, accessed by a stone spiral staircase. The gallery has wooden bench seating for a choir, and an enclosed area and a pyramidal music stand. The main body of the Church has box pews, some facing east, others, alongside the pulpit, face south toward the pulpit, indicating the liturgical emphasis toward the pulpit, where the sermons are delivered, rather than the altar, where the mass is celebrated. The pulpit itself is positioned part-way down the south wall, and is a wood-panelled triple combination of pulpit, reading desk and clerk's desk, which is re-worked from 17th century items.

== Wall paintings ==
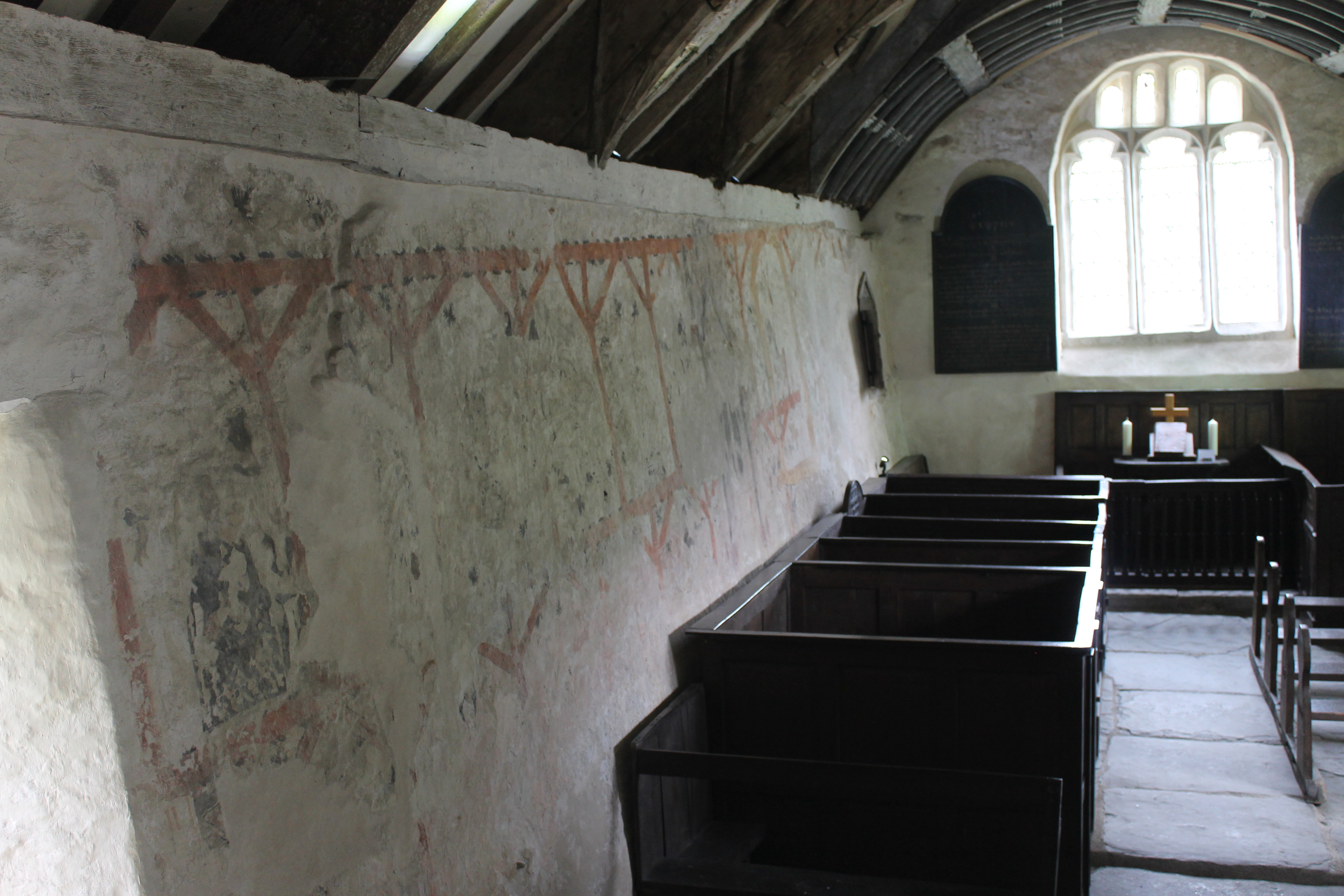
North wall of Llangar church, showing the series of rustic 'fictive wooden frames' for pictures such as a series of Passion scenes.

The north and south walls of the Church hold the fragmentary remains of possibly 8 different layers of wall painting, dating in age from the 15th to 18th centuries. The principle pre-reformation schemes were painted as sequences of paintings running for much of the length of the wall. On the north wall this takes the form of a series of rustic frames, evoking an idea of a wooden framework, which would have held a series of pictures, possibly depicting the passion, although the images within the frames are hard to decipher. Also on the north wall, overlaying some of the rustic frames, is a pre-reformation painting of an unknown Bishop, occupying an elaborate 'fictive architectural niche'.

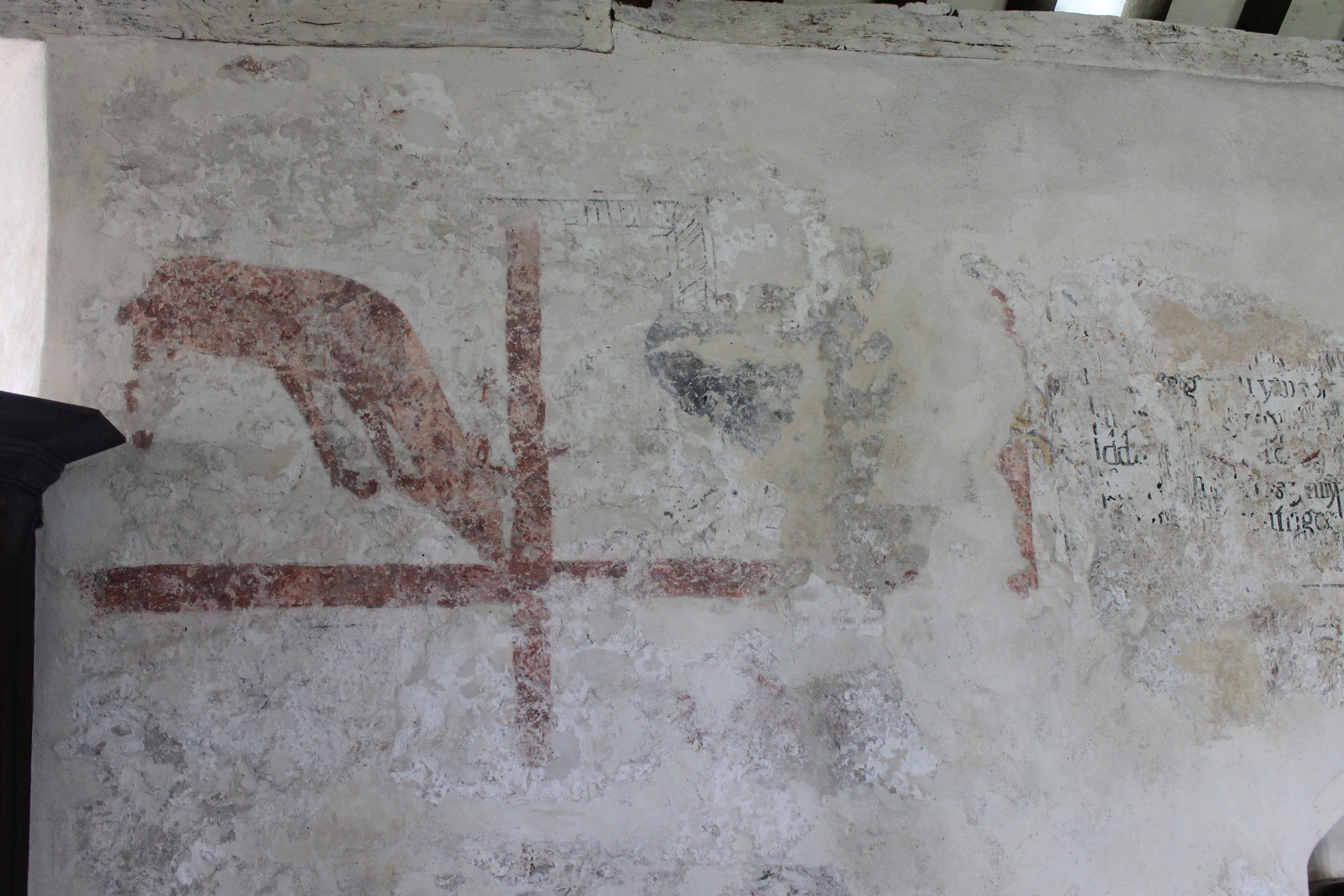
South wall 'deadly sin' painting of an animal, presumed to represent gluttony. The rider is lost but the image of the greedily feeding beast survives.

The south wall is divided into two rows of seven rectangular 'boxes'. In the upper row it appears there were images of personifications of the seven deadly sins, and in the row below a matching series of seven corporal works of mercy. This was a comparatively common theme in late medieval wall paintings, In the Llangar paintings, each of the seven deadly sins appear to be represented through a person riding on the back of an animal. There are only three churches in Britain which use this device, the others being Hardwick, Cambridgeshire and at Imber, Wiltshire. As with many medieval wall paintings, large areas of the Llangar paintings have been lost or obscured. In several of the scenes the rider's hats are still visible, and the animals can still be seen, but the details of the riders are unclear, perhaps defaced.

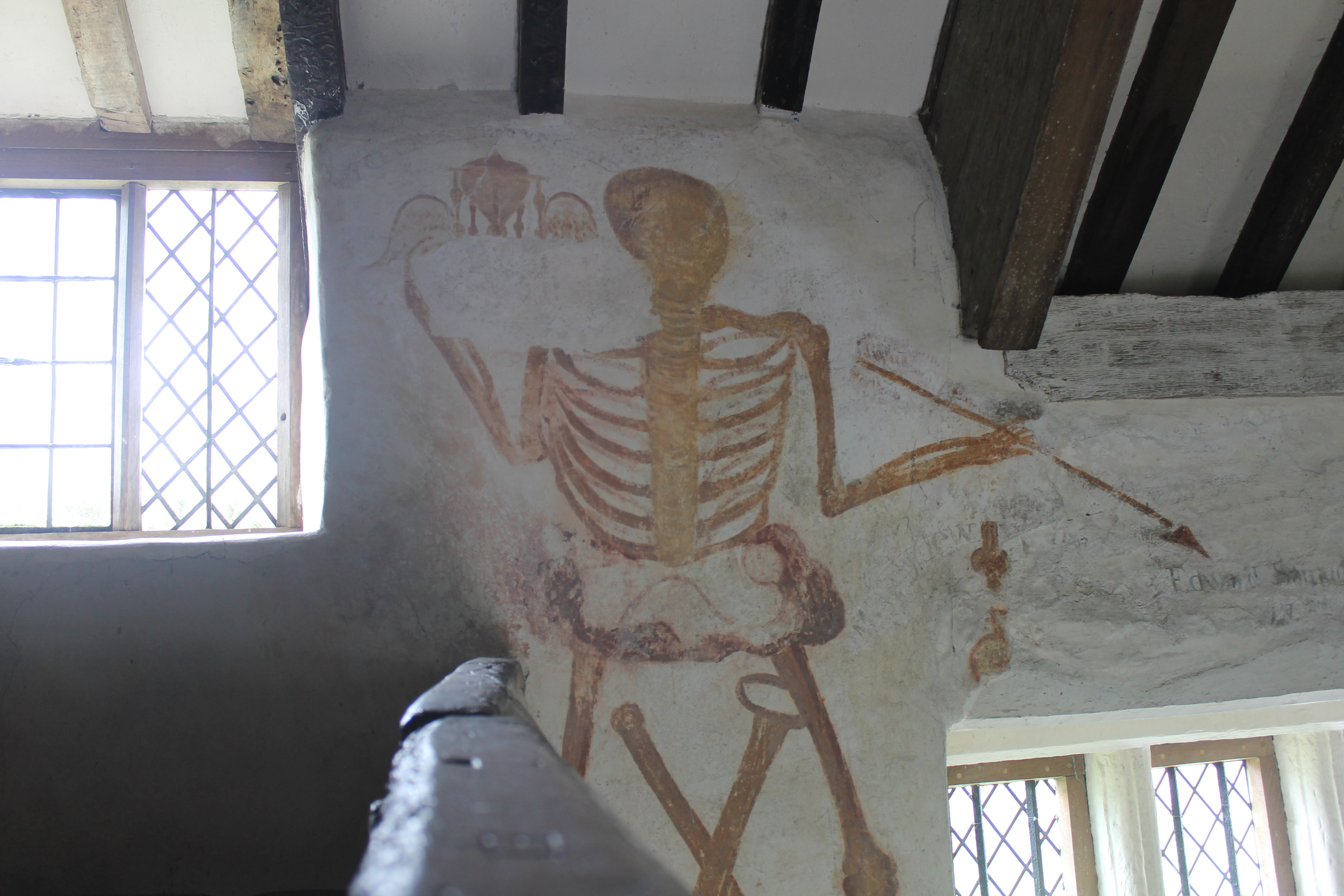
The 18th century figure of Death, on the north wall, facing the door.

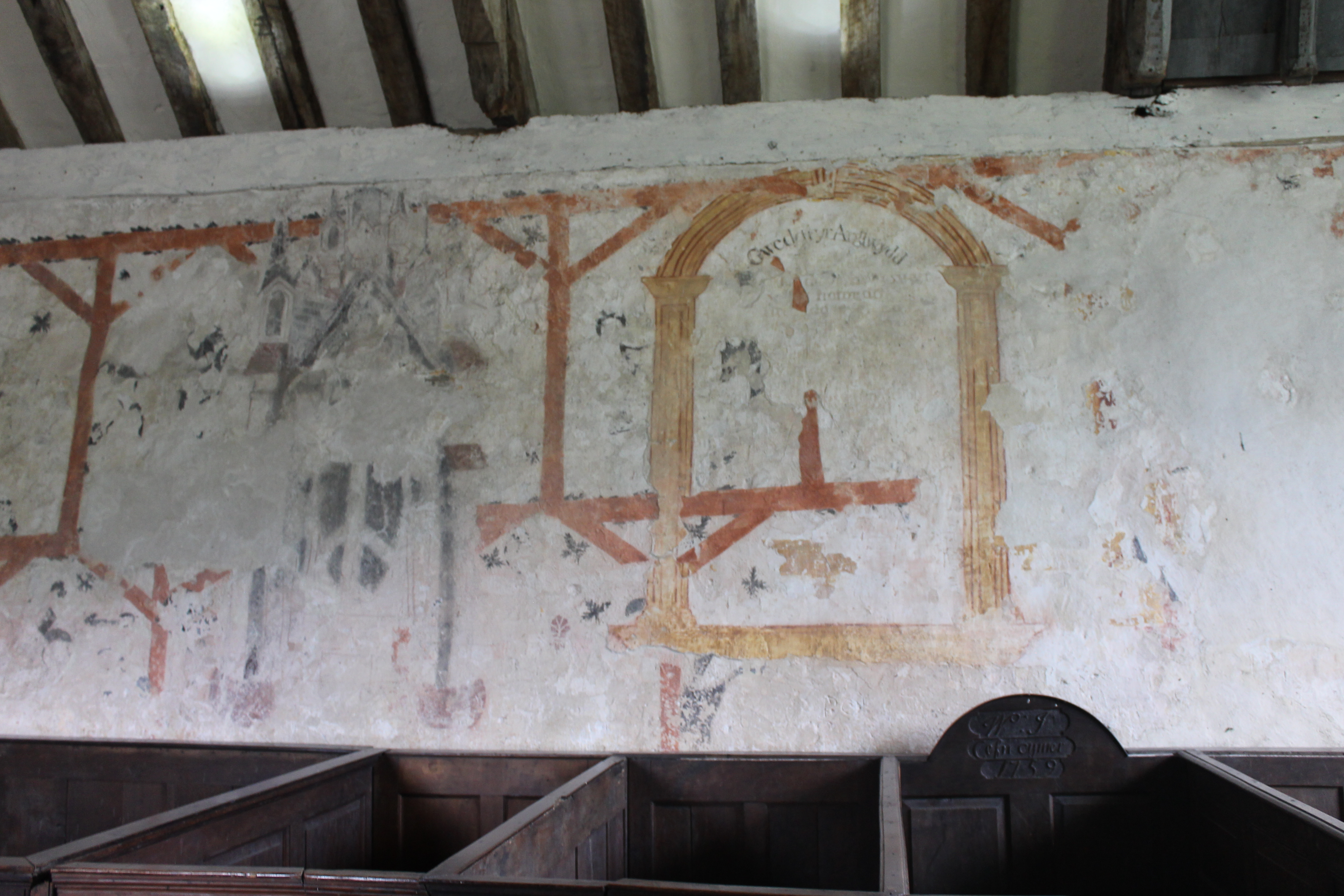
North wall paintings. Overlying the medieval panels are a picture of a bishop (left) and a post-reformation classical archway with the text of the Lord's Prayer.

The other paintings, found on various places around the Church, are mainly post-reformation works, painted after the now-unacceptable medieval images had been covered over. Most prominent, and most recent, is a large skeleton figure of Death, painted in the 18th century, serving as a reminder of mortality. The classical arch frame on the north wall had the text of Gweddi'r Arglwydd, the Lord's Prayer in Welsh. The various texts painted on the walls embody a shift from images to words after the Reformation, which matches the shift in focus of the internal layout from the altar to the pulpit.

There are no paintings on either of the two end walls, as both of these experienced structural problems and were rebuilt around 1615–1620, when the south porch was also added, and the west wall has been rebuilt twice since then. This paintings on the two long walls demonstrate that these have remained intact since the time of the earliest of the paintings. They also now show the problem of dealing with multiple painted schemes on the same area of wall. The paintings were conserved in 1991, revealing multiple images from various time periods, and decisions will have been made about when to leave some paint in place, and when to reveal older paintings at the expense of those on top.

== Cadw Guardianship ==
Llangar Church is a 'Guardianship monument', meaning that responsibility for the Church building is now in the hands of Cadw, having been formerly part of St Asaph Diocese of the Church in Wales. There remains a facility for two services a year to be held within the Church. Responsibility for Llangar passed to the Secretary of State for Wales (Cadw's predecessor) in 1967., and a project to investigate and conserve the Church was begun in 1974. Archaeological excavations under the stone floor, led by Ron Shoesmith, found no evidence dating back before the 14th century. The building was stabilised, made weatherproof, and in 1991 a scheme of work to reveal and conserve the wall paintings was completed. The building is accessible to visitors by arrangement with the Cadw staff based at Rug Chapel.

== See also ==
- Grade I listed buildings in Denbighshire
- List of Cadw properties
- List of Scheduled Monuments in Denbighshire

== Publications ==
- Yates, W N, (1993) Guide to Rug Chapel, Llangar Church and Gwydir Uchaf Chapel, Cadw: Welsh Historic Monuments, ISBN 0-948329-86-6
- Shoesmith, R, (1980), Llangar Church, Archaeologia Cambrensis : 129 : 64–132
