= Cader =

Village in Denbighshire, Wales

Coordinates: 53.135°N 3.479°W

- Location within Denbighshire
- OS grid reference: SJ010608
- Community: Nantglyn
- Principal area: Denbighshire
- Country: Wales
- Sovereign state: United Kingdom
- Post town: DENBIGH
- Postcode district: LL16
- Dialling code: 01745
- Police: North Wales
- Fire: North Wales
- Ambulance: Welsh
- UK Parliament: Bangor Aberconwy
- Senedd Cymru – Welsh Parliament: Clwyd West

Cader is a place in Denbighshire, Wales. Historically it was a township of Llanrhaeadr-yng-Nghinmeirch parish. It is 4 miles (6.4 km) south-west of Denbigh.
