= Edward Samuel =

Welsh cleric, poet and translator

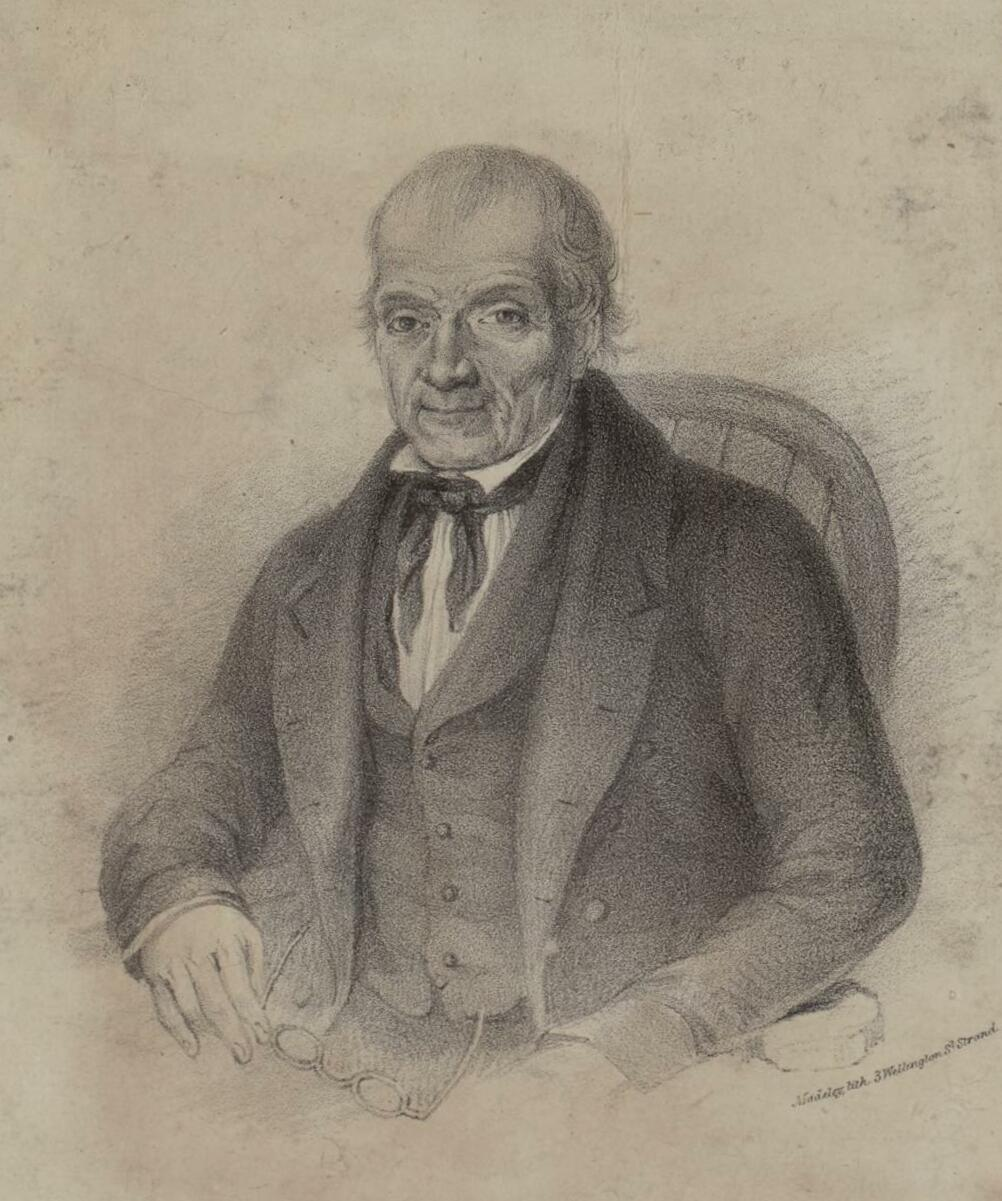
Edward Samuel

Edward Samuel (Penmorfa, Caernarfonshire 1674 – ?Llangar 1748), Welsh clergyman, poet and translator, was encouraged by Humphrey Humphreys, then bishop of Bangor, to train for the ministry, which he undertook at Oriel College, Oxford, from where, according to Thomas's History of the Diocese of St. Asaph, he graduated on 19 May 1693. He held in succession the Denbighshire livings of Betws Gwerfil Goch 1702–1721 and Llangar 1721–1748, with the latter held concomitantly from 1735 to 1747 with that of Llanddulas. His two sons followed him in the ministry.

== Works ==
His poetic publications include Llu o Ganiadau, neu Casgliad o Carolau a Cherddi...o Gasgliad W.Jones, Bettws Gwerfil Goch (posthumously Oswestry 1796); he also composed Eos Ceiriog (B.M. Add. MS.14961).

Samuel's sermons were published in 1731 and 1766, and his Bucheddau'r Apostolion a'r Efenglwyr (Shrewsbury, Thomas Jones) in 1704

Especially noted for his translations, Samuel achieved lasting eminence with Gwyrionedd y Grefydd Cristionogol (sic) from Grotius's De veritate religionis Christianae (London, 1716; 3rd ed. Spurrell, Carmarthen 1854). Other translations followed: Holl Ddyletswydd Dyn from Richard Allestree's The Whole Duty of Man (Shrewsbury 1718); Prif Ddyletswyddau Cristion (Shrewsbury, John Rhydderch 1722/3) from works by William Beveridge, one on the Book of Common Prayer (Anghenrhaid a Mawrlles Gweddi Cyffredin, the other Anghenrhaid a Mawrlles Mynych Gymmuno on the necessity of frequent communion; Athrawiaeth yr Eglwys and Pregeth ynghylch Gofalon Bydol (Chester, Roger Adams 1731), translations of two works, by Peter Nourse and William Wake respectively, Archbishop of Canterbury.

Thomas Parry in his History of Welsh Literature praises Samuel for his luxuriant, composite and balanced sentences (brawddegau rhwysfawr, cyfansawdd, mantoledig) and fine literary achievement (llenor coeth).

== Bibliography ==
- Y Bywgraffiadur Cymreig hyd 1940, London, Cymmrodorion 1953
- Thomas Parry, Hanes Llenyddiaith Gymraeg hyd 1900, Univ. Wales Press,1945,1946,1953, reprint. 1964
