= St Marcella's Church, Denbigh =

Coordinates: 53.1851°N 3.3911°W

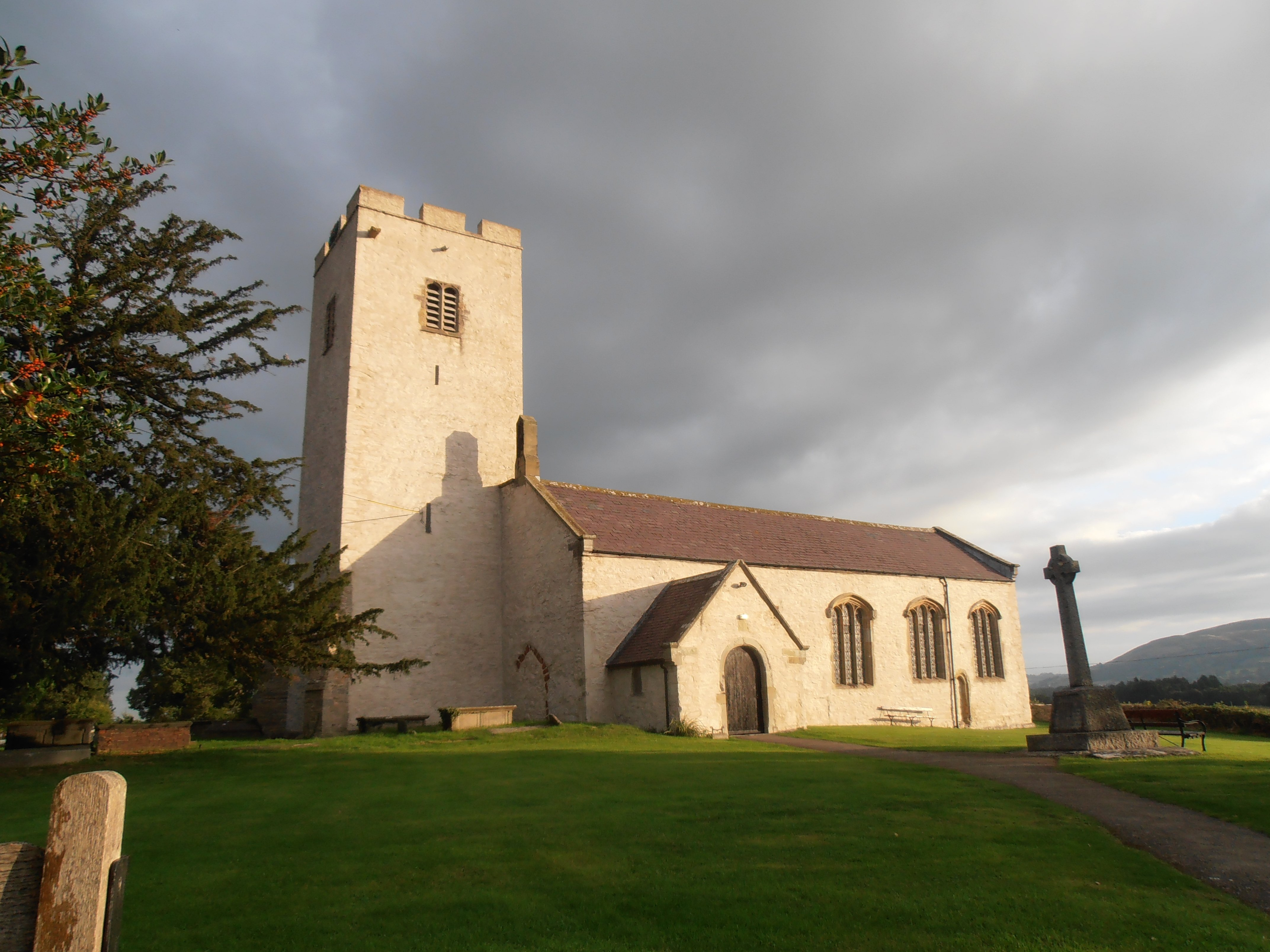
- Tower and porch

- Location in Denbighshire
- OS grid reference: SJ 071 662
- Location: Llanfarchell, Denbigh, Denbighshire
- Country: Wales
- Denomination: Church in Wales

Architecture
- Functional status: Active
- Heritage designation: Grade I
- Designated: 24 October 1950
- Architectural type: Church
- Groundbreaking: 15th/16th centuries with earlier origins

Specifications
- Materials: Body of church: rubble Roof: slate

Administration
- Diocese: St Asaph
- Archdeaconry: St Asaph
- Deanery: Denbigh
- Parish: Mission Area of Denbigh

St Marcella's Church was the original parish church of Denbigh, in Denbighshire, Wales. Located about a mile east of the centre of the town, the church is dedicated to Saint Marchell (Marcella), a Welsh saint of the 5th/6th centuries. Although with earlier origins, the present church dates to the founding of Denbigh and the building of Denbigh Castle by Henry de Lacy, Earl of Lincoln in around 1290. Most of the current structure dates from a major rebuilding in about 1500. St Marcella's was superseded as the parish church of the town in the 19th century by the more centrally located St Hilary's Chapel. It remains an active church in the Diocese of St Asaph and is a Grade I listed building.

== History ==
The Church of St Marcella stands on the Whitchurch Road, about a mile south-east of the town of Denbigh. It is dedicated to Saint Marcella the virgin (Marchell), a Welsh saint of the 5th or 6th centuries, who was the sister of Tyfrydog. Cadw suggests that the dedication references the site of a 7th-century cell. The current church dates from the founding of Denbigh and the building of Denbigh Castle by Henry de Lacy, Earl of Lincoln in around 1290. Little remains of this church and the present building dates almost entirely from a reconstruction of around 1500. Among the burials at the church is that of Twm o'r Nant, the Welsh poet, who died in 1810; the church also contains a memorial to him.

St Marcella's was replaced as the town's parish church in the 19th century by the more centrally located St Hilary's Chapel. It was restored in that century, and again in the 20th. It remains an active parish church in the Diocese of St Asaph and occasional services are held.

== Architecture ==
The church is built to a double-nave plan, with a west tower and a south porch. The architectural historian Edward Hubbard, in his 2003 Clwyd volume of the Pevsner Buildings of Wales, considers it one of the best examples of the type in the Vale of Clwyd. The building materials are sandstones of varying shades, and Welsh slate for the roof. (Note: The Church in Wales Historic record notes that the church was at one time rendered externally with whitewash, from which its alternative name of "Whitchurch" derives.) The Royal Commission on the Ancient and Historical Monuments of Wales (RCAHMW) records the "exceptionally fine" hammerbeam roof which is decorated with carved and painted corbels. The interior contains an impressive collection of funerary monuments dating from the 16th to the 18th centuries.

St Marcella's is a Grade I listed building. The lychgate and a monument in the churchyard are listed at Grade II.

== Gallery ==
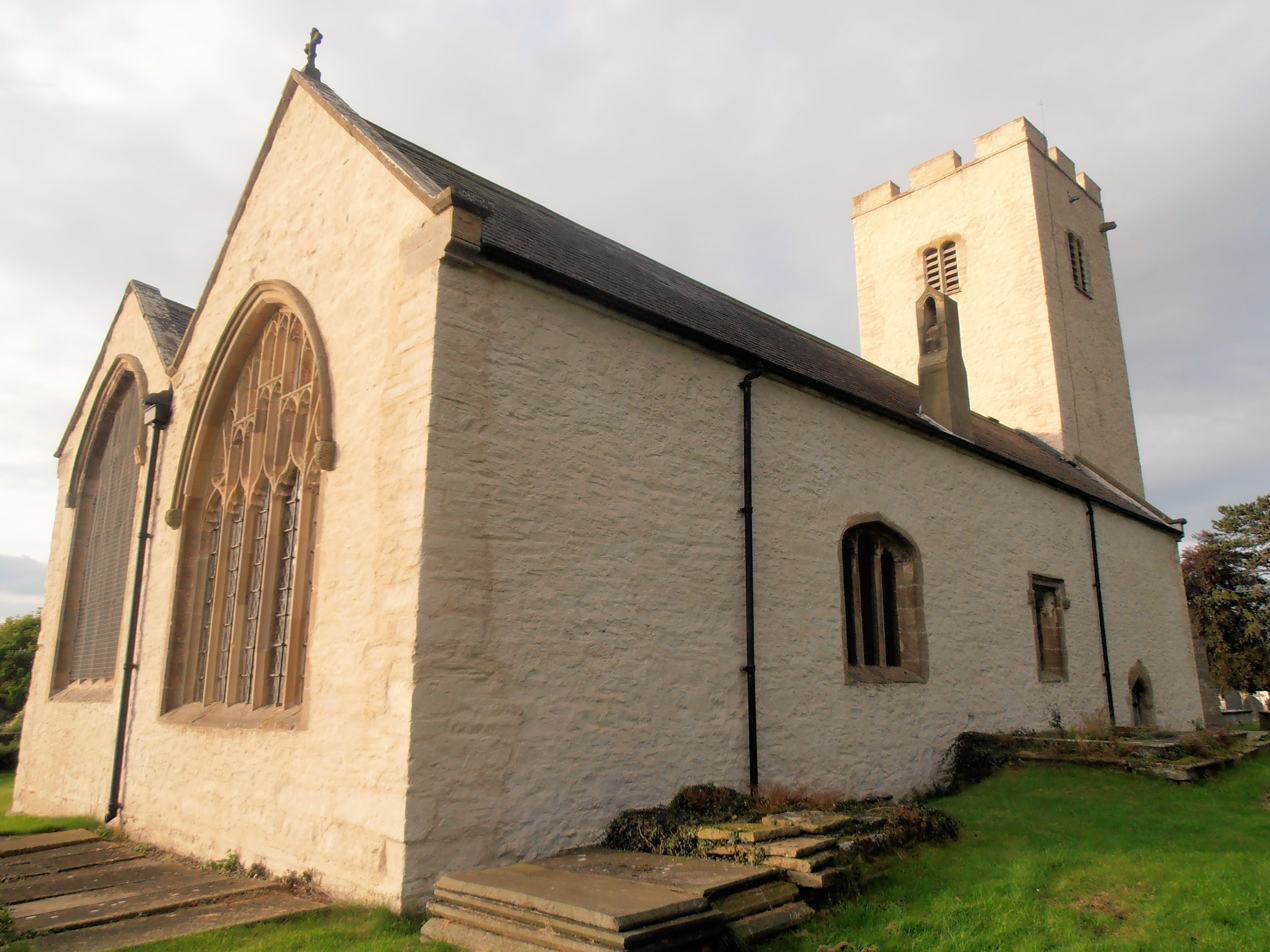
St Marcella's double nave

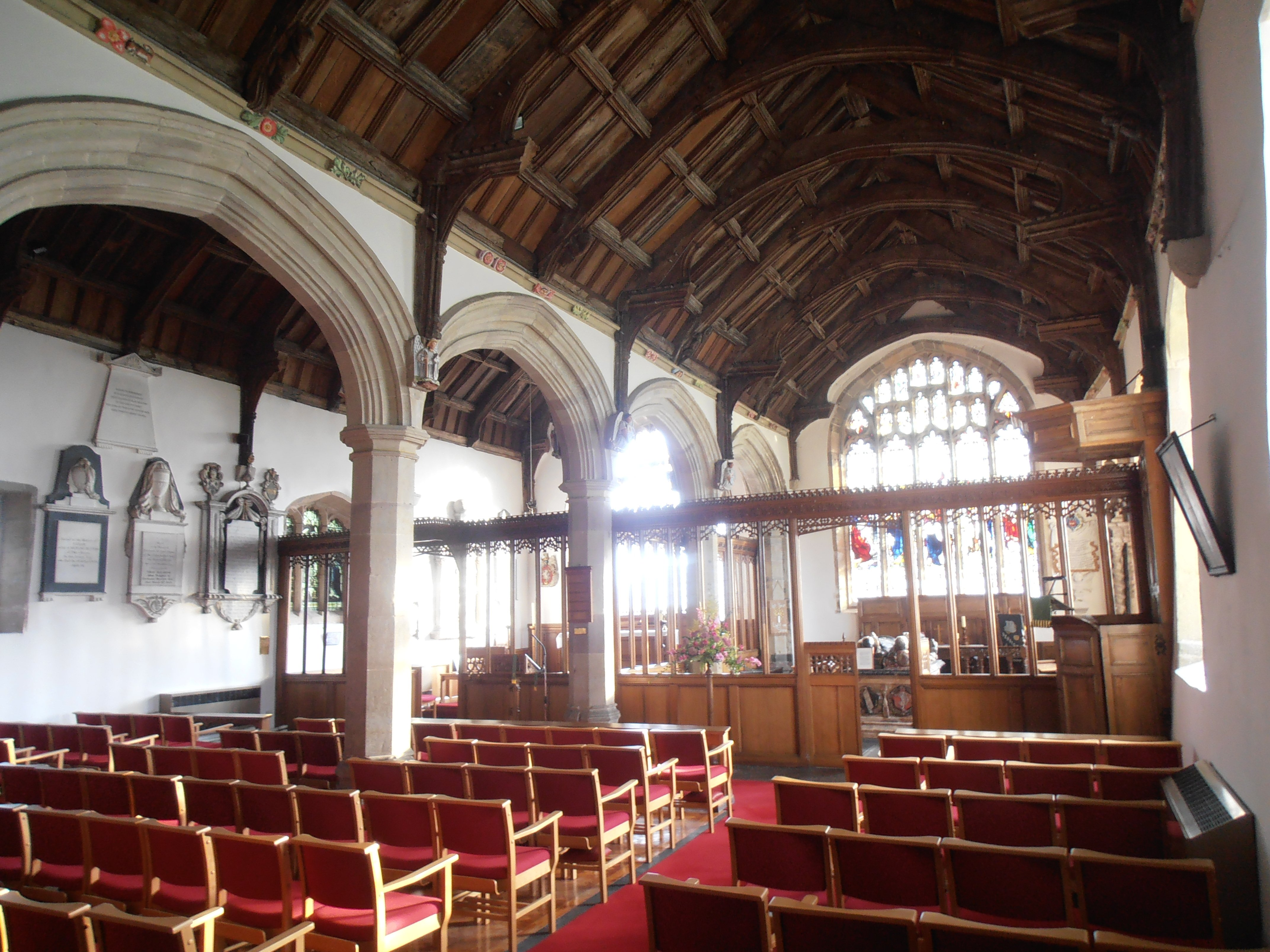
The interior

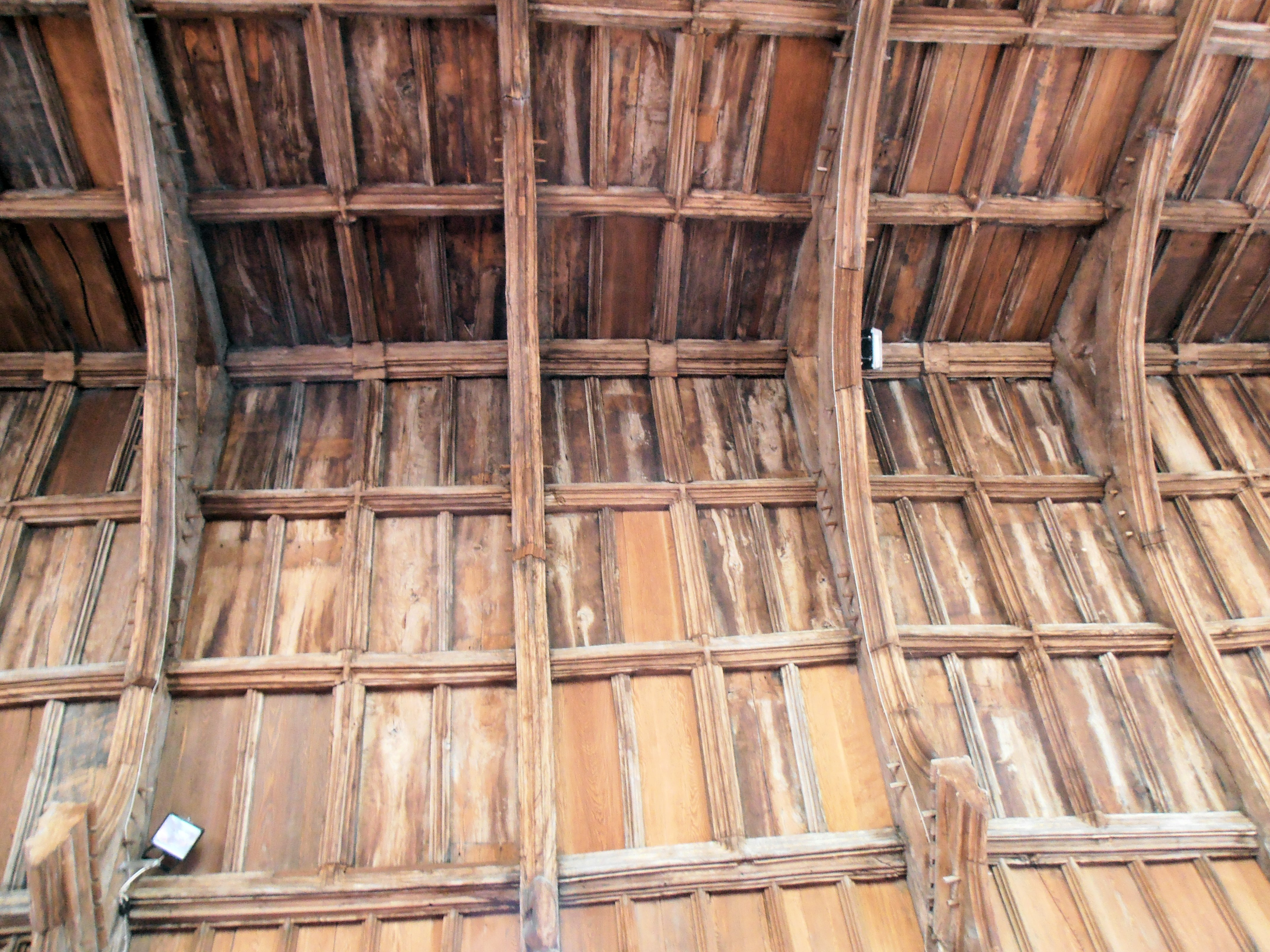
The "exceptionally fine" hammerbeam roof

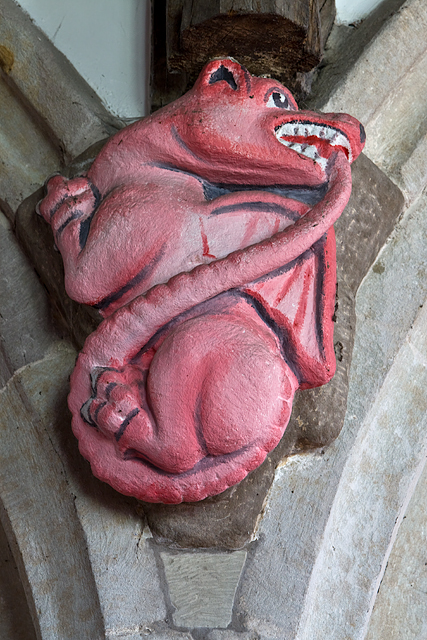
A roof corbel

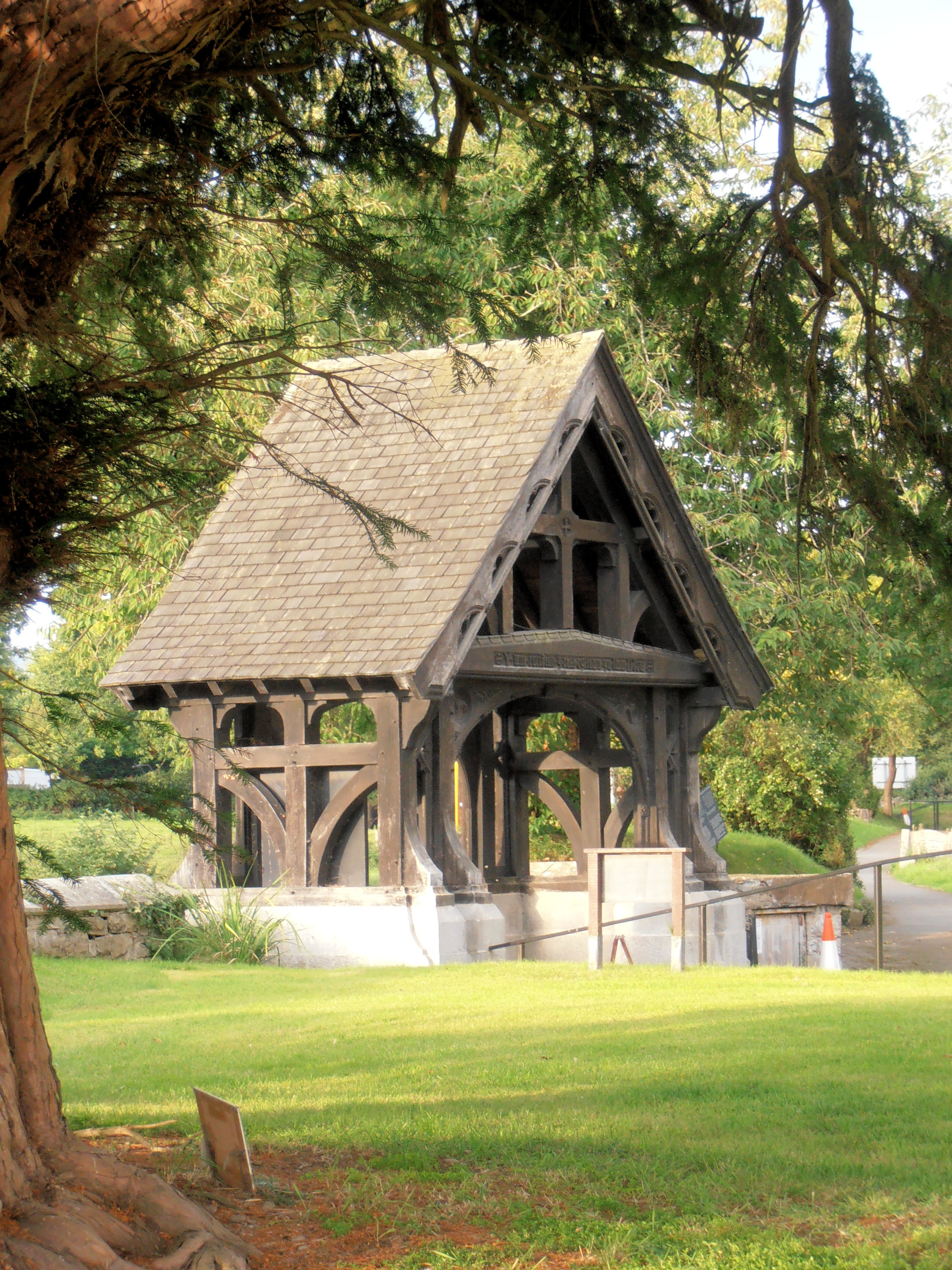
The lychgate

== Sources ==
- Hubbard, Edward (2003). Clwyd (Denbighshire and Flintshire). The Buildings of Wales. New Haven and London: Yale University Press. ISBN 978-0-300-09627-9. OCLC 315792534.
- Rees, Rice (1836). An essay on the Welsh saints or the primitive Christians, usually considered to have been the founders of the churches in Wales. London: Longman.
