= David Samwell =

Welsh naval surgeon and poet (1751–1798)

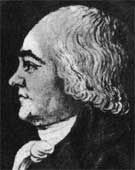
- Born: 15 October 1751; Nantglyn, Wales, Great Britain
- Died: 23 November 1798 (aged 47); London, Great Britain
- Occupations: Naval surgeon and poet

David Samwell (15 October 1751 – 23 November 1798) was a Welsh naval surgeon and poet. He was an important supporter of Welsh cultural organisations and was known by the pseudonym Dafydd Ddu Feddyg, meaning "Black David, the Doctor". Samwell was a surgeon on James Cook's third voyage of discovery from 1776 to 1780, and chronicled many aspects of the expedition, including Cook's death.

== Biography ==
Samwell was born in Nantglyn, a small village in Denbighshire, to William Samuel, a local vicar. His grandfather, Edward Samuel was also a notable Welsh author and poet. Samwell became a surgeon in the Royal Navy and between 1776 and 1780 he sailed around the world with Captain James Cook on board HMS Resolution. As a ship's surgeon it was Samwell's job to ensure the crew's health did not deteriorate over the long journeys to the Pacific Ocean. Aboard the ship Samwell wrote of his travels, including some poetry.

The journal of his experiences aboard Captain James Cook's ship provide a detailed account of the third and last voyage of Cook to the Pacific Ocean. Part of the journal describes the death of Captain Cook at the hands of natives on the Sandwich Islands (Hawaii) in 1779. He also wrote an unpublished journal, Some Account of a Voyage to the South Seas 1776–1777–1778, which is a work of social anthropology.

Between his voyages, Samwell lived in London. There he and other Welshmen would meet, and he joined the Gwyneddigion Society which had formed in 1770. The society was initially formed for men from North Wales, but gradually the membership grew to accept all Welshmen. The society celebrated with a rowdy ball every St David's Day and Samwell was described as one of the noisiest. He was described as 'tall, stout, black-haired, pock-marked, fierce looking, wondrous friendly in company' and when teased he would close one eye and look for a pot to throw at his tormenter.

In 1792, Iolo Morganwg (Edward Williams) organised here the first meeting of Gorsedd Beirdd Ynys Prydain at Primrose Hill in London. Samwell was present at the event which saw a stone circle set and a sword was ceremonially sheathed as a symbol of peace after the events of the French Revolution. The next year though saw Britain enter conflict with France during the French Revolutionary Wars, and in 1798 Samwell was treating English prisoners of war in Versailles. He returned to Britain in the autumn of that year and died in London in November.

== Bibliography ==
- McCririck, Mary (1963). Stories of Wales, Book 3. Denbigh: Gee and Sons.
- Sides, Hampton (2024). The Wide Wide Sea: Imperial Ambition, First Contact, and the Fateful Final Voyage of Captain James Cook. Doubleday. ISBN 9780385544764.
