= Saint Dyfnog =

Welsh saint

Saint Dyfnog was an early Welsh saint. (Note: Sources indicate the sixth or seventh century AD.) His feast day is 13 February.

== Saint Dyfnog ==
Dyfnog was the son of Medrod ab Caradog Freichfas and a brother of the grandfather of Cwyfen, coming to the area from North Britain. Dyfnog is said to have come from a wealthy family but chose to become a monk and to live simply. He built a small wooden church on the property which is now the Church of St Dyfnog, Llanrhaeadr. (Note: The present day church dates back to the 13th century.) (Note: When the church was restored and reopened in 1880, a monument was removed leading to the discovery of a wall recess. Human bones were found in a stone lined grave. They are believed to be the remains of St Dyfnog.)

The 16th-century Welsh poet Dafydd ap Llywelyn ap Madog included a tribute to Saint Dyfnog among his works. It is said that the poet was cured from a pain in his ribs and made a pilgrimage to the saint's well in thanksgiving. There is also a cywydd (a traditional Welsh poem) to him by an anonymous poet in Llanstephan MS 167 dating to the end of the 17th century. The poet says there was an image of Saint Dyfnog in the church at Llanrhaeadr. He described him as a man who had renounced the world, wore a shirt of thick horse hair fastened with an iron belt, lived on bread and water and did penance by standing under the stream of cold water. He continued by describing the variety of miraculous cures owed to the water of Saint Dyfnog's Well and the vast number of people who came to bathe there.

== Saint Dyfnog's Well ==
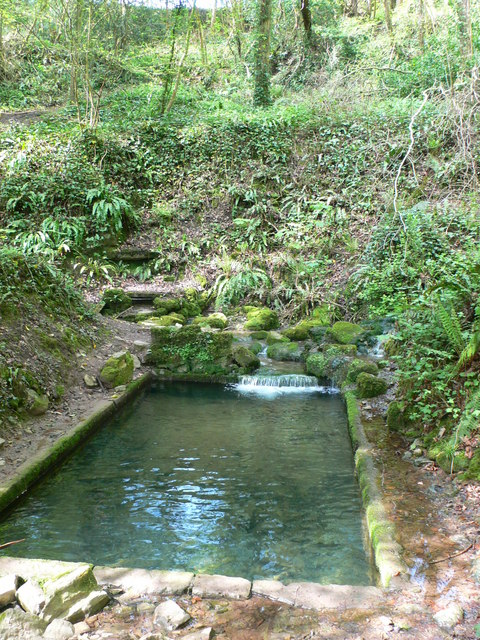
St. Dyfnog's Well

Saint Dyfnog chose to settle in an isolated wooded area with a spring-fed stream. The stream had a waterfall; legend has it that because Saint Dyfnog would stand in the cold waters for extended periods doing penance, clad in a hairshirt with a chain belt of iron; this was the reasoning for its curative powers. Over time, the stream became known as Ffynnon Dyfnog or Dyfnog's well.

As devotion to the saint increased, the waters became known for their healing powers. Many pilgrims came to bathe in the waters and pray, hoping to be cured of their ailments. The waters of the well were reputed to be especially effective for skin conditions, arthritis and rheumatism. (Note: The well was also said to be able to cure smallpox and deafness.) Those seeking relief for their illnesses would leave a donation to be used for the upkeep of the well and the church. Saint Dyfnog's Well was one of the most visited holy wells; because of the offerings from the well, St Dyfnog's was able to buy the elaborate 16th century Tree of Jesse window. The site appears to have been at the height of its popularity from the 16th to the 18th century. The sunken stone bath dates from the 16th or 17th century. The bottom of the stone bath is said to have been lined with marble at one time.

During this time, various structures were built around the well and bath to accommodate the many pilgrims. Browne Willis wrote in 1721 that there were rooms for changing into bathing clothing and other buildings; one was said to be a chapel which had images of the 12 Apostles in its lower half. Thomas Pennant said the fountain was "inclosed in an angular wall decorated with human figures and before it is the well for the use of the pious bathers". (Note: The water was said to be soft and very cold with no unpleasant taste.) In later times the well and its surroundings fell into neglect. Richard Fenton's 1808 visit to the well found that the building which formerly enclosed the bath had fallen in and was ruined with the "bath choaked up". By 1880 little evidence of the former buildings on the site remained. Attempts were made to revitalise the site; some bridges were built over the stream and small statues were again brought to the area surrounding the well. The well remains a popular place for pilgrims; some churches have visited the well to conduct baptisms using the water of the well. The site of the well was named a Grade II Listed Building in the National Historic Assets of Wales, on 29 November 1999.

=== Restoration ===
The Llanrhaeadr Preservation Society began discussing a restoration of Saint Dyfnog's Well in 2012. Their initial focus was on its preservation but as time went by, the aspects of heritage, culture and the effect on the environment were also realised. The Society sought funding from the Lottery Heritage Fund and a rural enterprise agency, Cadwyn Clwyd. They hope their efforts will result in a religious tourist attraction and centres for the environment and education. The restoration project began in August 2019. The initial excavation found that the site was also a quarry used to make stone tools some 6,000 years earlier.
