= St Dyfnog's Church, Llanrhaeadr =

Coordinates: 53.1596°N 3.3749°W

Church of St Dyfnog
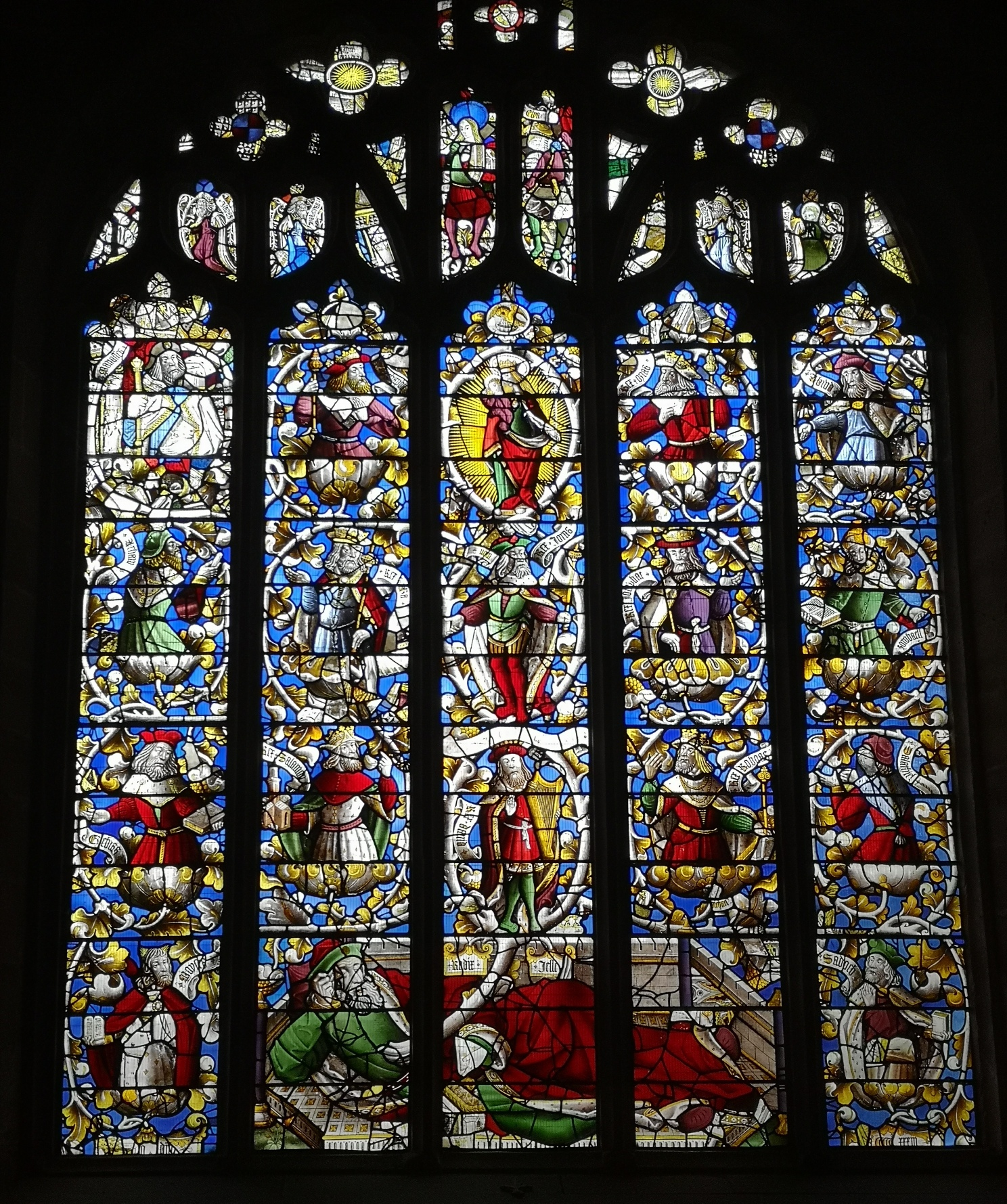
- "the finest window in all Wales"

- Location in Denbighshire
- OS grid reference: SJ081633
- Location: Llanrhaeadr-yng-Nghinmeirch, Denbighshire
- Country: Wales
- Denomination: Church in Wales
- Website: St Dyfnog's Church website

History
- Status: parish church
- Founded: 13th century

Architecture
- Functional status: Active
- Heritage designation: Grade I
- Designated: 19 July 1966
- Architectural type: Church

Administration
- Diocese: St Asaph
- Archdeaconry: St Asaph
- Deanery: Denbigh
- Parish: Mission Area of Denbigh

Clergy
- Vicar: Rev. Val Rowlands

St Dyfnog's Church is a small church in the village of Llanrhaeadr-yng-Nghinmeirch (Llanrhaeadr) in Denbighshire, Wales. The church stands on the western edge of the Llanrhaeadr Hall estate, and its setting was developed by the estate in the 18th and 19th centuries as The Dingle. The eyecatcher at its western end is St Dyfnog's Well. Associated with the 6th century Welsh saint, Saint Dyfnog, to whom the church is dedicated, it became an important holy well pilgrimage site in the 17th century. The church dates from the 13th century, although with much rebuilding in the 15th and 16th. It contains an important Tree of Jesse stained glass window which has been described as "some of the finest glass in Wales". St Dyfnog's remains an active church in the Diocese of St Asaph and is a Grade I listed building.

== Saint Dyfnog ==
Dyfnog was the son of Medrod ab Caradog Freichfas and a brother of the grandfather of Cwyfen, coming to the area from North Britain. He built a small wooden church on the property which is now the Church of St Dyfnog in Llanrhaeadr.

== History ==
The first mentions of the church occur in the Norwich Taxatio Ecclesiastica of 1254 and the Lincolnshire Taxatio of 1291. The South chamber and the door of the tower may both date from this time. The "particularly fine enriched roofs" are later, dating from re-modellings in the 15th and 16th centuries. The Jesse window, the church's most famous feature, dates from 1533. The window is reputed to have been removed and buried during the English Civil War to protect it from destruction. It was re-instated in 1661. The church suffered at the hands of Victorian restorers; Arthur Baker's restoration of 1879–1880 is described as "indifferent" by Cadw and as "inappropriate" in the Clwyd volume of The Buildings of Wales. The church remains an active parish church within the Mission Area of Denbigh.

== Architecture and description ==
The church is constructed of limestone rubble with sandstone dressings and slate roofs. It has a double nave, a South chamber and a four-storey tower. The architectural historian Edward Hubbard notes the style as Perpendicular, with the possible exception of the tower door.

The interior contains a "wonderfully complete" Tree of Jesse window, described by Cadw as "the apogee of the early Tudor North Wales school of glazing". The window, showing Jesus's descent from Jesse, has been called "the finest Glass window in all Wales, exceeded by few in England".

The church also contains a number of significant monuments to local grandees including those of Watkin Edwards Wynne and Maurice Jones, the latter "large and Baroque, (a) reclining bewigged effigy". There is also a rare carved pelican, dated 1792, shown feeding its young with its blood. The church is a Grade I listed building, the listing recording it as "an exceptionally fine late medieval church (with) the famous Jesse window".

== Gallery ==
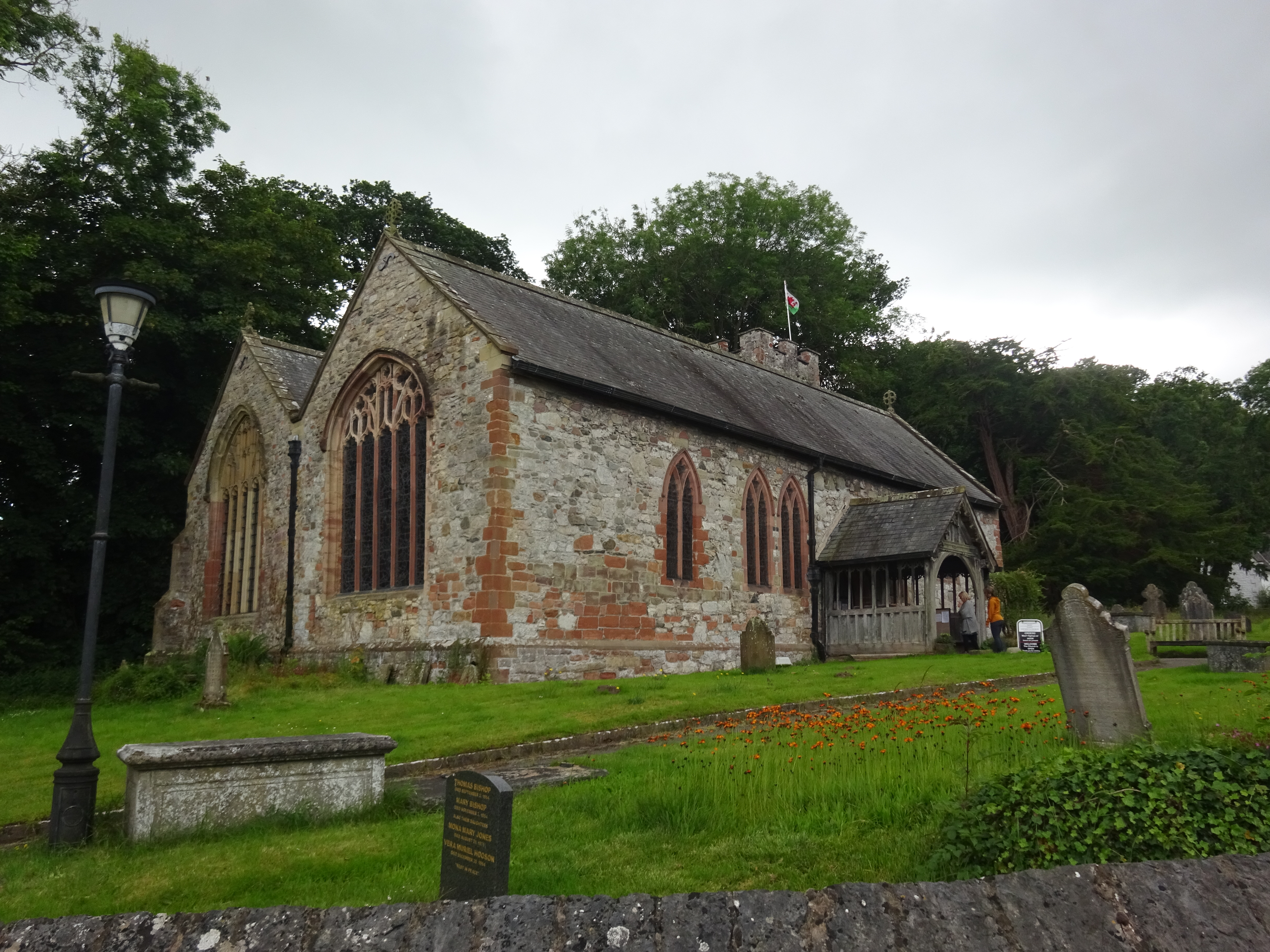
Side view of the church showing the double nave, the south porch and the offset western tower

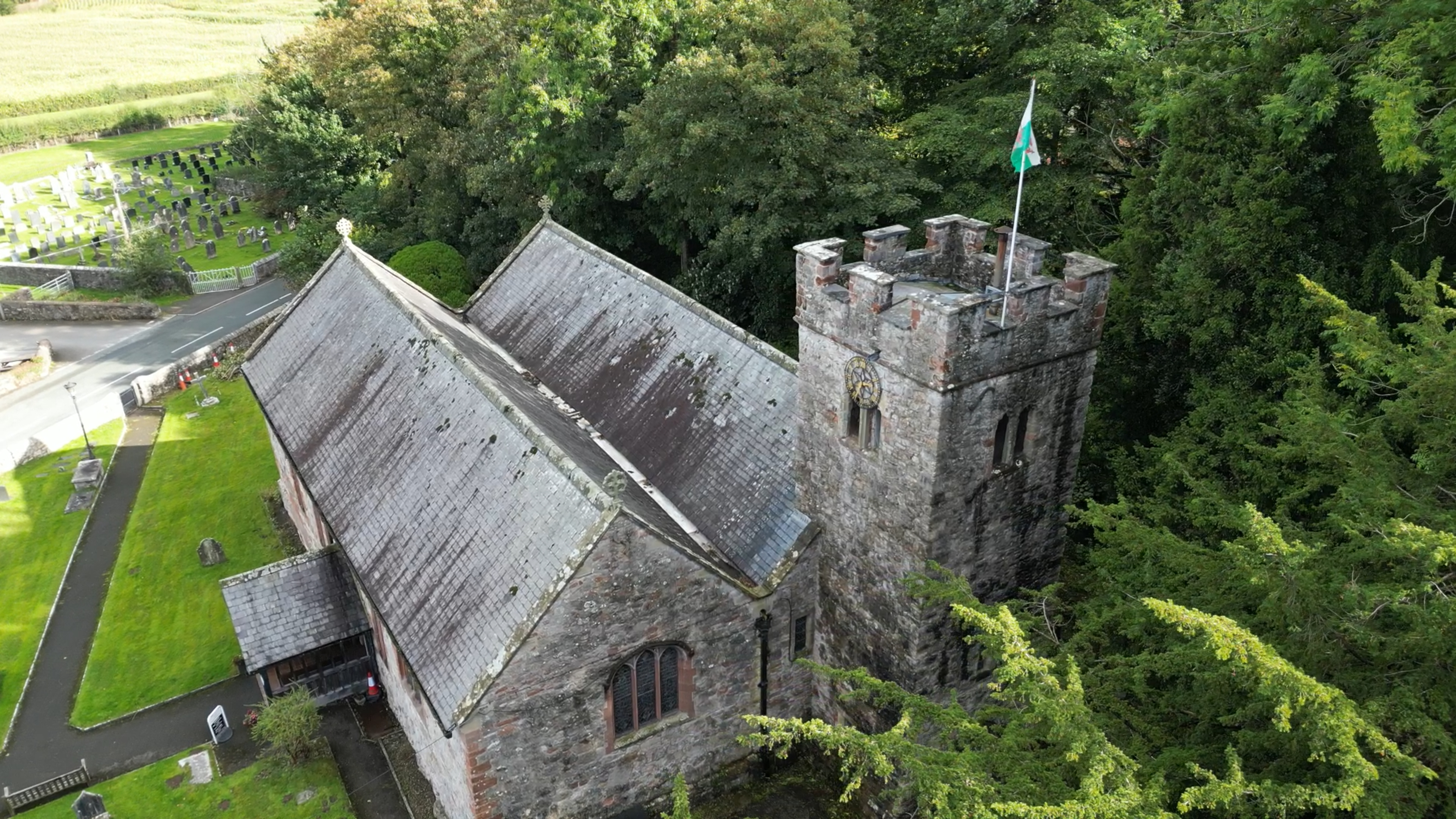
Aerial view

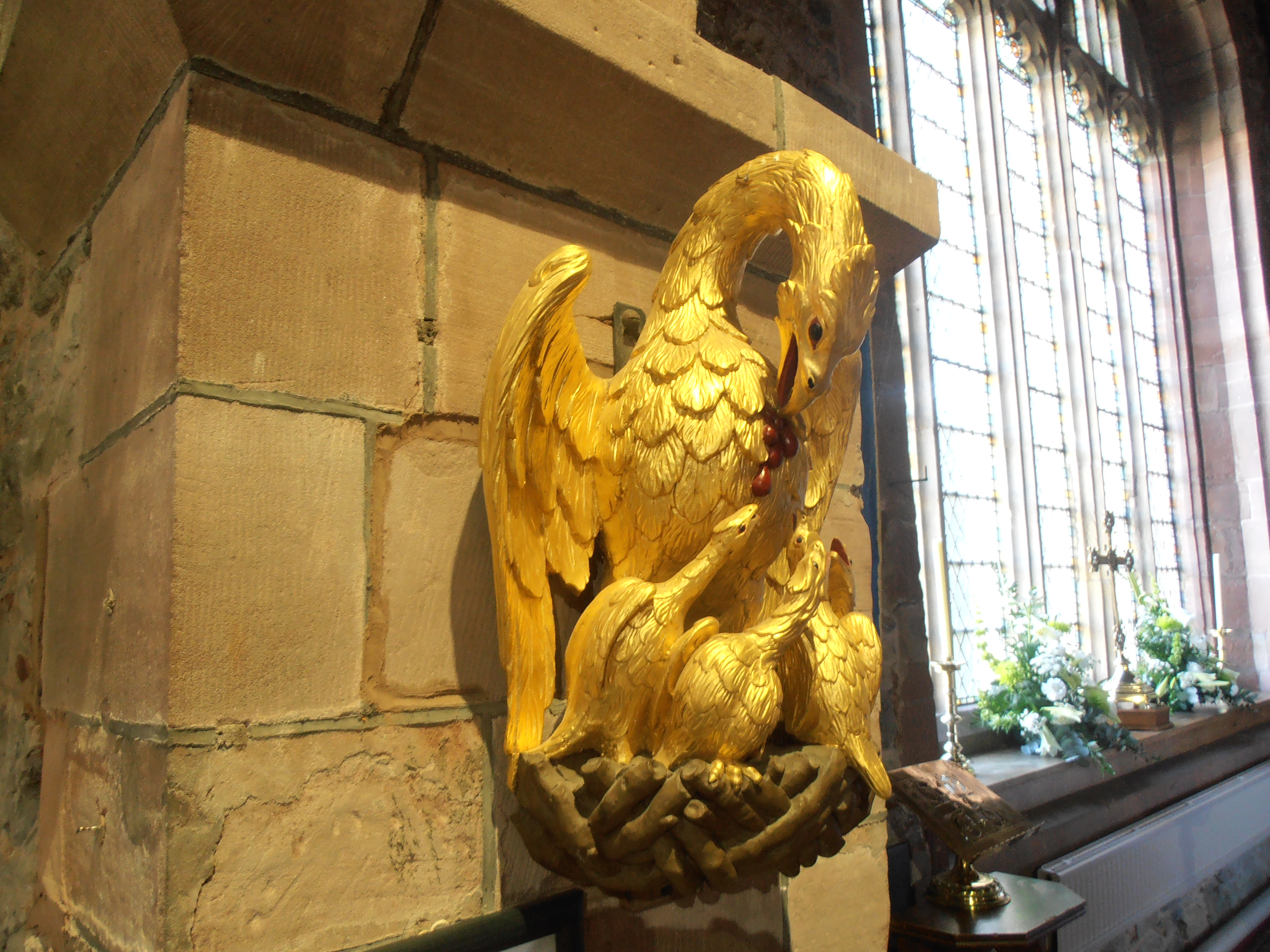
Pelican in piety

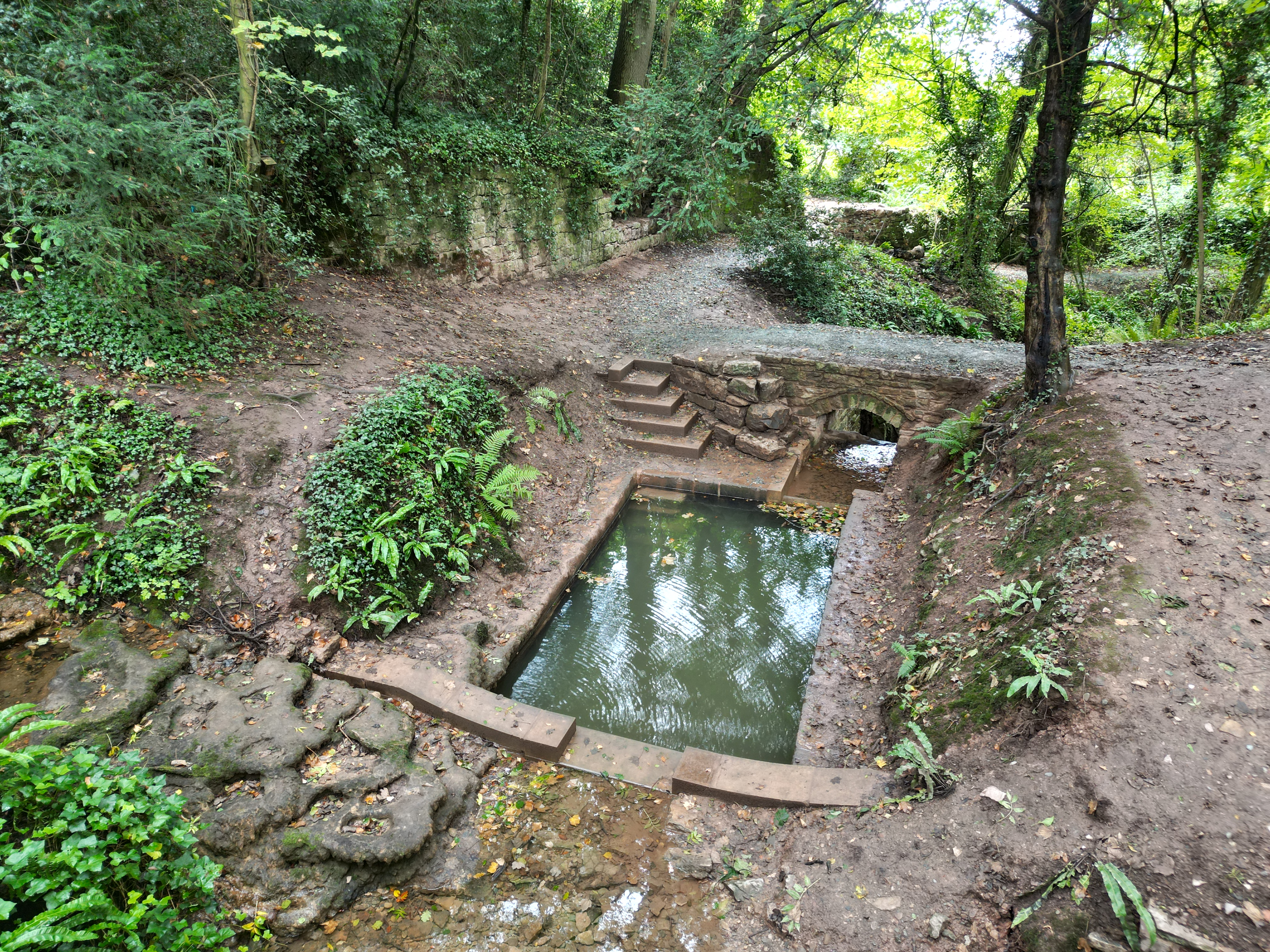
Dyfnog's Well
