= Nantglyn =

Village in Denbighshire, Wales

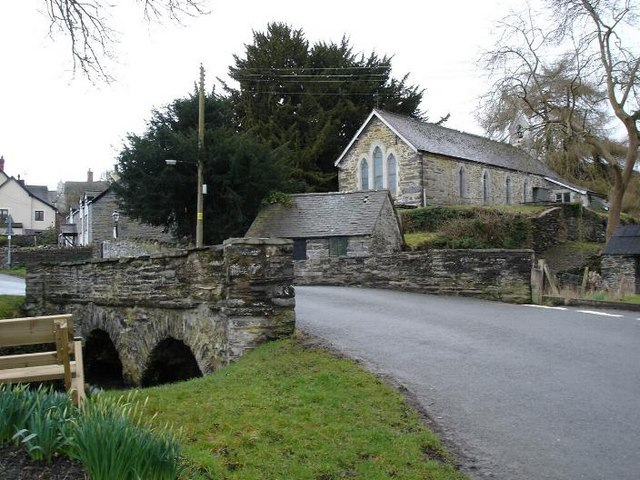
- Nantglyn

- Location within Denbighshire
- Population: 323 (2011)
- OS grid reference: SJ003621
- Community: Nantglyn
- Principal area: Denbighshire
- Country: Wales
- Sovereign state: United Kingdom
- Post town: DENBIGH
- Postcode district: LL16
- Dialling code: 01745
- Police: North Wales
- Fire: North Wales
- Ambulance: Welsh
- UK Parliament: Bangor Aberconwy
- Senedd Cymru – Welsh Parliament: Clwyd West
- List of places UK Wales Denbighshire 53.147°N 3.490°W Map of the community

Nantglyn is a small village and community in Denbighshire, Wales. The population of the community taken at the 2011 census was 323. It is situated in a rural location about 4.5 miles (7.2 km) away from the nearest town, Denbigh. Nantglyn is located on a small river, the Lliwen. This river and its parent, the Afon Ystrad, provided the water to power several corn and fulling mills in the parish.

According to tradition, a monastery was founded here by Mordeyrn, grandson of Cunedda Wledig. The community includes Cader.

== Amenities ==
The parish church is dedicated to St James. It was extensively renovated in 1777 and again in Victorian times. A notable feature of its churchyard is the "pulpit in a tree" built into an ancient yew, which traditionally was once used by John Wesley. A memorial to the fallen of the two World Wars sits at the centre of the village.

== Recent history ==
There are now no shops remaining in Nantglyn. But previously there was a blacksmith's forge, a post office, a pub and a leather-craft shop that also sold candles (located in the old smithy). There was also a local infant / junior school, but a decline in the number of pupils led to its closure in the 1990s. There were also several Nonconformist chapels in the village, including Capel-y-Waen (Waen Nantglyn is a secondary settlement about a mile northwest of the main village), Capel Soar and Capel Salem. One of the corn mills, Segrwyd Mill, served the neighbourhood farmers until 1960.

Nantglyn Football Club plays in the Llandyrnog & District Summer League. The club was formed in 1992 as Groes, but did not have its own pitch, initially playing at Denbigh Mental Hospital and then at Denbigh Rugby Club. In 1998 the club applied to use the pitch at Lower Park in Denbigh, and it was forced to rename to Nantglyn due to Groes being in Conwy County Borough. Nantglyn won the league in 2005 and 2006 and now have their own pitch in the village.

== Notable people ==
Nantglyn has had several notable residents over the centuries, including David Samwell (1751–1798), the ship's surgeon aboard the Discovery during Captain Cook's final voyage of exploration. Samwell kept a journal that provides a detailed record of the voyage, and he witnessed Cook's death at the hands of hostile natives in Hawaii in 1779.

Dr. William Owen Pughe (1759–1835), a well-known literary figure who compiled a Welsh-English dictionary and a Welsh grammar, among other works, lived in the village for the last 10 years of his life, although he was not born there. His son Aneurin Owen also lived here.

Twm o'r Nant (1739–1810), composer, was born in Llannefydd but grew up in Nantglyn. Robert Davies (1769–1835), poet and author, became known as "Bardd Nantglyn". Tom Pryce (1949–1977), Formula 1 racing driver, spent his youth in the village.
