= Dafydd ap Hwlcyn ap Madog =

Welsh poet

Dafydd ap Hwlcyn ap Madog was a 17th-century Welsh poet who wrote cywydd-style verse, such as that transcribed by John Thomas in the National Library of Walkes manuscript 669D.
