= Llangar =

Former parish in Denbighshire, Wales

Coordinates: 52.971°N 3.397°W

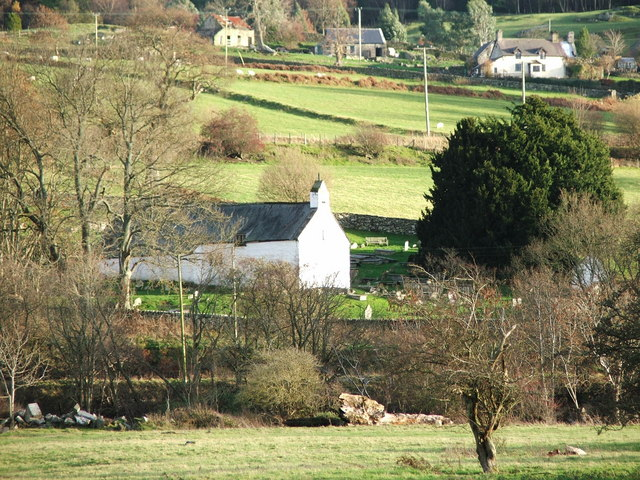
- Llangar Church

- Location within Denbighshire
- OS grid reference: SJ0642
- Community: Cynwyd, Denbighshire
- Principal area: Denbighshire
- Preserved county: Clwyd
- Country: Wales
- Sovereign state: United Kingdom
- Post town: CORWEN
- Postcode district: LL21
- Dialling code: 01490
- Police: North Wales
- Fire: North Wales
- Ambulance: Welsh
- UK Parliament: Dwyfor Meirionnydd
- Senedd Cymru – Welsh Parliament: Clwyd South

Llangar is a former civil parish in Denbighshire in Wales, 1 mile (1.6 km) south west of Corwen, its post town, and 10 miles (16 km) north east of Bala. It is situated at the confluence of the rivers Alwen and Dee, and includes the small hamlets of Bryn, Cymer, and Gwynodl. A large portion of the parish is barren. The small village stands on the road from Corwen, by the Vale of Edeyrnion. The Dee is crossed by a bridge about 1 mile (1.6 km) away at Cynwyd. It lies in the bro and former cwmwd of Edeirnion.

Llangar Church is a remote rural church that was abandoned in 1856, but survived to become a Cadw guardianship building. The interior features 14th and 15th century wall paintings. It is now protected as a Grade I listed building, and open to the public for tours.

== Notable residents ==
- Henry Wynn-Williams, an early New Zealand member of parliament, was born in Llangar
