= St Hilary's Chapel =

Ruined church in Denbigh, Wales

Coordinates: 53°10′54″N 3°25′11″W

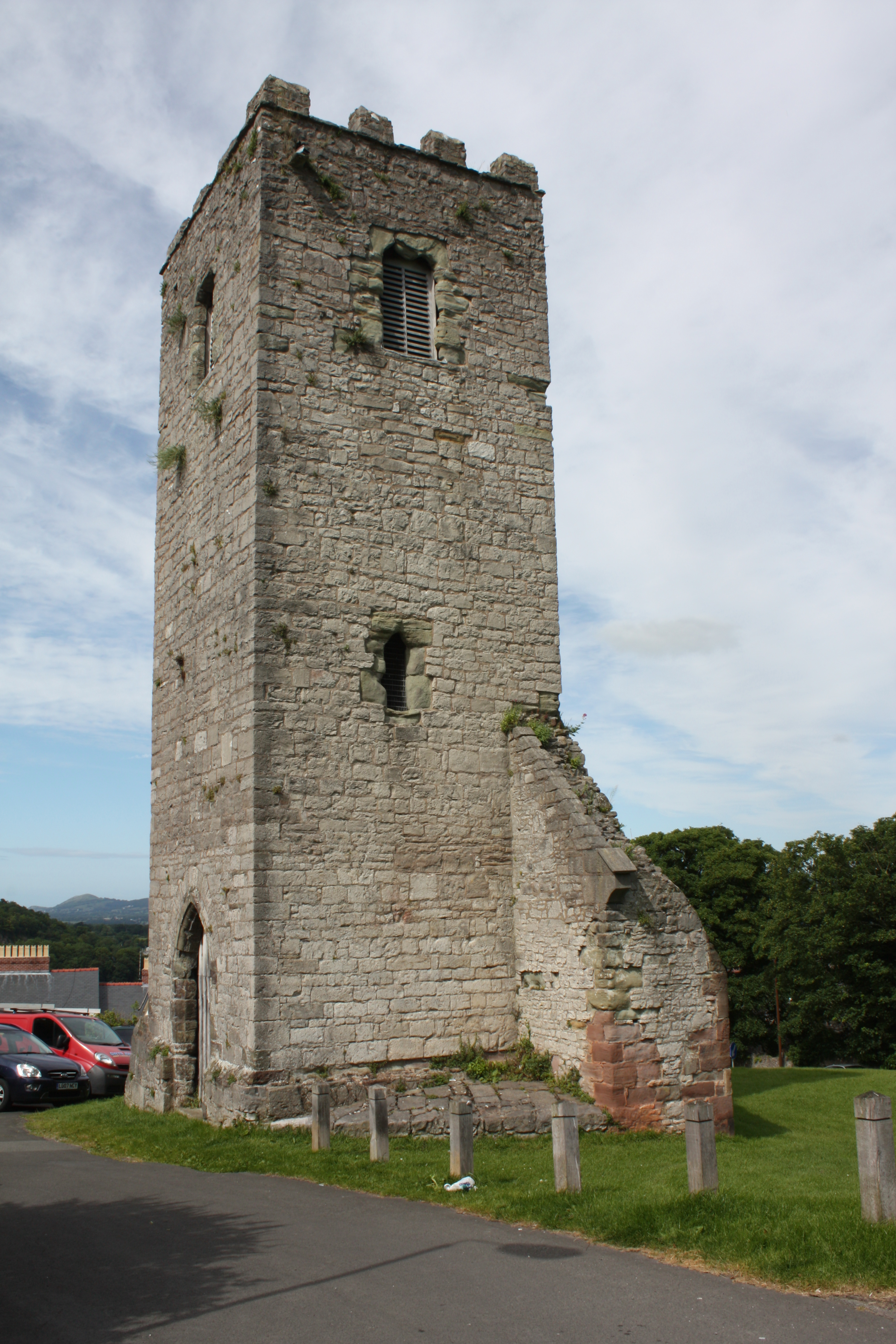
The tower of St Hilary's Chapel

St Hilary's Chapel (also St Hilary's Church) is a former church in Denbigh, Denbighshire, north Wales, of which only the tower remains. The town's garrison church, it lay to the north Denbigh Castle. It dates to c. 1290, when the borough town was built by Henry de Lacy, Earl of Lincoln; the earliest mention of it is in 1334. In the 1530s the antiquary John Leland described it as a "goodlye and large chappelle in the old towne... whither most of the new towne do yett cumme". On 28 September 1645, during the English Civil War, a service at the church was attended by Charles I, the Archbishop of York, Lord Keeper Williams and numerous other important officials.

The limestone rubble church with red and brown and green sandstone dressings was abandoned in 1874 when a church was erected at St Mary's Church, Lenten Pool. In 1923 the church was largely demolished, leaving just the tower of roughly 14 metres (46 ft). The tower became a Grade I listed building on 24 October 1950.

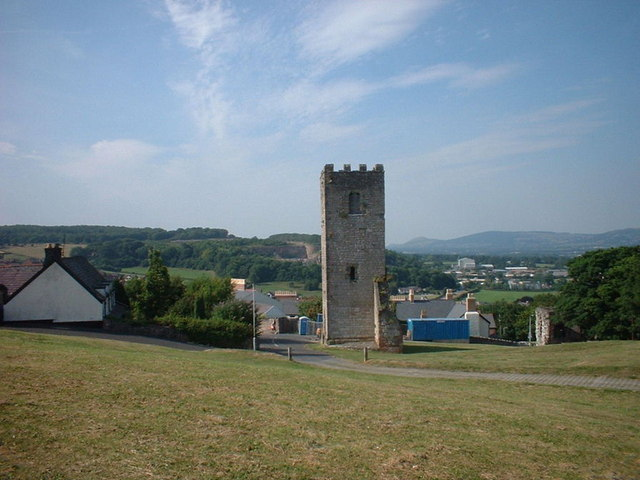
The tower from a distance
