= Grade II* listed buildings in Denbighshire =

Denbighshire shown within Wales

In the United Kingdom, the term listed building refers to a building or other structure officially designated as being of special architectural, historical, or cultural significance; Grade II* structures are those considered to be "particularly important buildings of more than special interest". Listing was begun by a provision in the Town and Country Planning Act 1947. Once listed, strict limitations are imposed on the modifications allowed to a building's structure or fittings. In Wales, the authority for listing under the Planning (Listed Buildings and Conservation Areas) Act 1990 rests with Cadw.

== Buildings ==
Name	Location Grid Ref. (Note: Sometimes known as OSGB36, the grid reference is based on the British national grid reference system used by the Ordnance Survey.) Geo-coordinates	Date Listed	Function	Notes	Reference Number	Image
Plas Newydd	Cefnmeiriadog; SJ0000173038; 53°14′42″N 3°30′00″W	10 June 1952		Strikingly located on a rocky rise some 1.6km NW of Cefn Meiriadog village; located immediately W of the lane running NW from Cefn Meiriadog to Glascoed.	153	Upload Photo
Dolbelidr	Cefnmeiriadog; SJ0309570921; 53°13′35″N 3°27′11″W	30 January 1968		Located in a picturesque setting on the S side of the river Elwy at the SE boundary of the community; accessed via a long track running N from Brynwgan farm, itself accessible via a track leading NE from the lane running NE from Henllan to Trefnant.	176	See more images
Perthewig	Trefnant; SJ0650871060; 53°13′42″N 3°24′07″W	30 January 1968		Set in fields approximately 1.5km E of Trefnant village, within a farm group and set back behind cock-and-hen coped rubble forecourt walls; accessed via a long, unmetalled track running W from the road leading to Pont-y-Cambwll.	224	Upload Photo
No 1 Llannerch Hall	Trefnant; SJ0541472308; 53°14′22″N 3°25′07″W	6 February 1983		Set in its own mature parkland at the northern edge of the community, approximately 1km N of Trefnant village; accessed via a long drive running NE from the A 525 St. Asaph to Denbigh Road.	260	See more images
Pont Corweb, Stryd y Bont (Bridge Street)	Corwen; SJ0693543370; 52°58′47″N 3°23′15″W	6 April 1952			656	See more images
Rug, Rug	Corwen; SJ0563544054; 52°59′08″N 3°24′26″W	6 April 1952			660	Upload Photo
Uchel-dref, Ucheldref	Corwen; SJ0490445184; 52°59′44″N 3°25′06″W	6 April 1952			661	Uchel-dref, Ucheldref
Gwerclas Hall	Cynwyd; SJ0528142135; 52°58′06″N 3°24′42″W	6 April 1952		Located approximately 1.5km NW of Cynwyd, and reached by a lane which leads from Pont Dyffrdwy.	662	See more images
St Mary's Church	Betws Gwerfil Goch; SJ0323646599; 53°00′29″N 3°26′37″W	20 October 1966		At the centre of the village of Bettws Gwerfil Goch, in a square churchyard which is considerably raised above the surrounding land at the SE. Lychgate to north. Rubblestone churchyard wall, partly earth-backed.	664	See more images
Church of St Mael and St Sulien, High Street (South side)	Corwen; SJ0788943412; 52°58′48″N 3°22′24″W	20 December 1966			666	See more images
Churchyard Cross, High Street (South side)	Corwen; SJ0787343398; 52°58′48″N 3°22′25″W	20 October 1966			667	Churchyard Cross, High Street (South side)
Coleg y Groes (The College), High Street	Corwen; SJ0789743377; 52°58′47″N 3°22′24″W	20 October 1966			668	Coleg y Groes (The College), High Street
Corwn Manor (Old Workhouse), Heol Llundain (London Road) (South side)	Corwen; SJ0802543366; 52°58′47″N 3°22′17″W	20 October 1966			669	See more images
Pont Melin Rug, Rug	Corwen; SJ0507543561; 52°58′52″N 3°24′55″W	20 October 1966		Carries the A5 road over the River Alwen 2km approx. W of Corwen.	673	Upload Photo
Blaenddol House	Corwen; SJ0271944514; 52°59′21″N 3°27′02″W	20 October 1966		At the extreme north-west of the community, approached off a lane which leaves the main A5 at Pont Melin Rug.	674	Upload Photo
Pont Carrog	Corwen; SJ1152943711; 52°59′00″N 3°19′09″W	20 October 1966		Carries the minor road from Llidiart y Parc to Carrog over the River Dee.	675	See more images
St Beuno's Church	Gwyddelwern; SJ0746946683; 53°00′34″N 3°22′50″W	20 October 1966		In the village of Gwyddelwern, to west of the main road. Stone churchyard wall with modern gateway; former schoolroom near entrance.	676	See more images
Plas-yn-Faerdref	Llandrillo; SJ0446738793; 52°56′17″N 3°25′23″W	20 October 1966		Located off the E side of the road, in a slightly raised position, approx 2km N of Llandrillo.	697	Upload Photo
Branas Uchaf	Llandrillo; SJ0150737323; 52°55′27″N 3°27′59″W	20 October 1966		In a fine position overlooking the N banks of the River Dee, approx 2.5km W of Llandrillo. At the end of a track which runs S off a lane which follows the river between Llanderfel and Cynwyd.	698	Upload Photo
Ty'n y Llwyn	Cynwyd; SJ0627041632; 52°57′50″N 3°23′49″W	20 October 1966		Located on the hillside above the River Dee, and reached by a track off the E side of the B4401.	705	Upload Photo
Pont Dyfrdwy	Cynwyd; SJ0530041248; 52°57′37″N 3°24′41″W	20 October 1966		Located immediately W of Cynwyd village, and carrying a minor road over the River Dee.	707	Pont Dyfrdwy
Bodidris	Llandegla; SJ2048753703; 53°04′29″N 3°11′18″W	28 April 1952		Approximately 2 km NE of Llandegla, at the end of a narrow lane leading N from the A 5104, occupying a commanding hillside position with a walled garden to north and listed estate buildings to south-west.	712	Bodidris
Plas Ashpool	Llandyrnog; SJ1066467804; 53°11′59″N 3°20′20″W	28 April 1952		To the east side of the B5429, about 2km north of Llandyrnog village; farm buildings to north-west side.	714	Upload Photo
Plas-uchaf	Llanfair Dyffryn Clwyd; SJ1253852741; 53°03′53″N 3°18′24″W	28 April 1952		Reached by a minor road and a private drive about 3 km south-south-west of Llanfair Dyffryn Clwyd.	717	Upload Photo
Pont Rhyd-y-Cilgwyn	Rhewl; SJ1084560385; 53°07′59″N 3°20′03″W	28 April 1952		Spanning the river Clywedog immediately W of the main road in the village centre.	718	Upload Photo
Bachymbyd Fawr	Llanynys; SJ0927461083; 53°08′21″N 3°21′28″W	28 April 1952		Located approximately 200m SW of the main road on the western slopes of the Vale of Clwyd; accessed via a farm lane.	719	Upload Photo
St Tysilio's Church	Bryneglwys; SJ1448547368; 53°01′00″N 3°16′34″W	19 July 1966		At north side of the village of Bryneglwys, within a hilltop graveyard surrounded by a rubblestone wall; iron gates to south.	721	See more images
St Foddhyd's Church	Clocaenog; SJ0818854229; 53°04′39″N 3°22′19″W	19 July 1966		At the west side of the village of Clocaenog. Square churchyard with stone wall to front and to east side overlooking lower ground.	723	See more images
Cross in churchyard of St Mary's Church	Derwen; SJ0702750714; 53°02′44″N 3°23′18″W	19 July 1966		Opposite the south porch of St Mary's Church.	726	Cross in churchyard of St Mary's Church
Derwen Hall	Derwen; SJ0929851671; 53°03′17″N 3°21′17″W	19 July 1966		2 km east of Derwen church.	729	Derwen Hall
Parish Church of St Michael and All Angels	Efenechtyd; SJ1115555778; 53°05′31″N 3°19′41″W	19 July 1966		Located in the village centre within its own rubble-walled churchyard.	730	See more images
Plas-yn-Llan	Efenechtyd; SJ1109655688; 53°05′28″N 3°19′44″W	19 July 1966		Set back on the W side of the main village street behind a walled forecourt, at the southern edge of the village group.	731	Plas-yn-Llan
Gatepiers and associated Forecourt Walls at Plas-yn-Llan	Efenechtyd; SJ1111855680; 53°05′27″N 3°19′43″W	19 July 1966		Enclosing a forecourt in front of Plas-yn-Llan and facing the main village street to the W.	732	Upload Photo
St Mary's Church	Cyffylliog; SJ0589857834; 53°06′34″N 3°24′26″W	19 July 1966		Located in the centre of the village on the western banks of the Afon Clywedog; sited within its own rubble-walled churchyard featuring several good C18 and C19 chest tombs.	733	See more images
Old Stable Block and Bodidris Cottage to South-west of Bodidris	Llandegla; SJ2045253665; 53°04′27″N 3°11′20″W	19 July 1966		Some 100m SW of Bodidris, forming the E side of a courtyard group, bounded to the north by a range which includes Laundry Cottage, Gardener's Cottage and the Barn; to the west by the Bothy and sheltershed; with range of outbuildings to the south.	746	Upload Photo
St Tyrnog's Church	Llandyrnog; SJ1078465098; 53°10′32″N 3°20′11″W	19 July 1966		In village of Llandyrnog, in a graveyard which now extends beyond a lane to the east; part lost to road widening at west. Stone churchyard wall with steps up at west; war memorial and sundial within the churchyard.	748	See more images
St Cwyfan's Church	Llandyrnog; SJ1203366287; 53°11′11″N 3°19′04″W	19 July 1966		In a square churchyard 1.5 km north-east of St Tyrnog's Church. Stone churchyard wall with iron gate at south; modern copy of stocks in an enclosure with iron railings beside the gate; formerly a village pound at north side.	749	See more images
Glan-y-wern Hall	Llandyrnog; SJ0988266026; 53°11′01″N 3°21′00″W	19 July 1966		1 km north-west of Llandyrnog village, in parkland to north of the Waen to Denbigh road.	755	Glan-y-wern Hall
St Elidan's Church	Llanelidan; SJ1098850542; 53°02′41″N 3°19′45″W	19 July 1966		1 km south of Nantclwyd Hall, in a stone-walled churchyard with iron gate and steps to south; also entered at north by a late-C19 timber-framed lychgate. War memorial cross at west.	760	See more images
Nantclwyd Hall	Llanelidan; SJ1110851882; 53°03′24″N 3°19′40″W	19 July 1966		1 km north of Llanelidan church and 200 m east of the A494 Bala to Ruthin road, in the parkland of the C17 house re-landscaped in the C20.	765	See more images
Church of St Cynfarch and St Mary	Llanfair Dyffryn Clwyd; SJ1344655478; 53°05′22″N 3°17′38″W	19 July 1966		East side of the village of Llanfair Dyffryn Clwyd in a walled churchyard with the stump of a preaching cross; Church House and lychgate to south; iron gates to west.	767	See more images
Jesus Chapel	Llanfair Dyffryn Clwyd; SJ1403053714; 53°04′25″N 3°17′05″W	19 July 1966		Close to the house named Capel-y-gloch, on the east side of the A525 Wrexham Road, 1?km south of Llanfair Dyffryn Clwyd.	768	See more images
Garthgynan	Llanfair Dyffryn Clwyd; SJ1427955378; 53°05′19″N 3°16′53″W	19 July 1966		Reached by a minor road, about 1km east of Llanfair Dyffryn Clwyd.	778	Upload Photo
St Hychan's Church	Llangynhafal; SJ1143762134; 53°08′56″N 3°19′32″W	19 July 1966		At the west side of the B5429, north of the turning to Pont Llanychan. The churchyard is rounded at the north but is otherwise square.	787	See more images
Plas-draw	Llangynhafal; SJ1347962264; 53°09′02″N 3°17′43″W	19 July 1966		Set back on the east side of the minor road from Llangynhafal to Hirwaen (in Llanbedr).	789	Upload Photo
Llanrhaeadr Hall	Llanrhaeadr yng Nghinmeirch; SJ0853463487; 53°09′38″N 3°22′10″W	19 July 1966		Located approximately 750m E of Llanrhaeadr village and set within its own grounds; accessed via a long, tree-lined and gated drive running NE from the road.	795	Llanrhaeadr Hall
Barn at Pant Glas Isaf	Llanynys; SJ0928759582; 53°07′32″N 3°21′26″W	1 October 1970		Located towards the southern boundary of the community immediately to the N of the present farmhouse; accessed via a short track running W from a lane leading SW from the A 525.	817	Upload Photo
Cae'r Afallen	Ruthin; SJ1275859618; 53°07′36″N 3°18′19″W	16 May 1978			818	See more images
51 Clwyd Street	Ruthin; SJ1218258166; 53°06′48″N 3°18′48″W	16 May 1978	House		856	Upload Photo
Porth	Ruthin; SJ1214058159; 53°06′48″N 3°18′51″W	16 May 1978			859	Upload Photo
The Old Cloisters	Ruthin; SJ1235458405; 53°06′56″N 3°18′39″W	24 October 1950			908	Upload Photo
The Church House (Old Grammar School)	Ruthin; SJ1237458437; 53°06′57″N 3°18′38″W	24 October 1950			910	Upload Photo
Castle Hotel	Ruthin; SJ1240058299; 53°06′53″N 3°18′37″W	24 October 1950			917	See more images
Seven Eyes	Ruthin; SJ1238858305; 53°06′53″N 3°18′37″W	7 April 1966			918	See more images
North Wales Hospital: Primary Range, including adjoining walled 'Airing Courts' to NW and SE	Denbigh; SJ0515865137; 53°10′30″N 3°25′14″W	2 February 1981		Located within its own parkland setting approximately 1km S of Denbigh set back to the W of the lane.	951	See more images
Denbigh Friary	Denbigh; SJ0593966562; 53°11′16″N 3°24′33″W	24 October 1950		Situated at the lower (eastern) end of the town, at the foot of the hill; at the end of the lane, itself leading E off Rhyl Road.	958	See more images
Bronyffynnon aka Hen Cartref	Denbigh; SJ0507266109; 53°11′01″N 3°25′19″W	30 November 1966		Set back slightly from the street behind railed rubble forecourt walls.	966	Bronyffynnon aka Hen Cartref
Capel Mawr including associated School-room and forecourt railings	Denbigh; SJ0524766273; 53°11′06″N 3°25′10″W	2 February 1981		Prominently-sited on the corner with Beacon's Hill.	974	Capel Mawr including associated School-room and forecourt railings
Lon Swan Independent Chapel, including associated Hall, forecourt walls & railings	Denbigh; SJ0532466204; 53°11′04″N 3°25′06″W	2 February 1981		Set back from the lane behind its own railed, walled forecourt.	976	Lon Swan Independent Chapel, including associated Hall, forecourt walls & railings
Swayne Johnson & Wight, Solicitors Offices	Denbigh; SJ0531766130; 53°11′02″N 3°25′06″W	24 October 1950		Prominently-sited at the corner with Vale Street.	979	Upload Photo
Bull Hotel	Denbigh; SJ0531266069; 53°11′00″N 3°25′06″W	24 October 1950		Prominently-sited on the corner with Park Street.	981	Bull Hotel
The County Hall (now Denbigh Library)	Denbigh; SJ0529666111; 53°11′01″N 3°25′07″W	24 October 1950		Prominently-sited at the E end of High Street.	984	The County Hall (now Denbigh Library)
Bryn Celyn	Denbigh; SJ0502866167; 53°11′03″N 3°25′22″W	2 February 1981		Set back from the road behind a curved, narrow forecourt bounded by a hedge.	985	Upload Photo
Royles Pharmacy, including adjoining ranges to the rear	Denbigh; SJ0528366080; 53°11′00″N 3°25′08″W	30 November 1966		On the street-line.	1000	Upload Photo
St Mary's Church	Denbigh; SJ0499066139; 53°11′02″N 3°25′24″W	2 February 1981		Prominently located at the Lenten Pool roundabout, set back slightly behind low curving forecourt walls.	1007	See more images
1 Park Street	Denbigh; SJ0533466090; 53°11′01″N 3°25′05″W	2 February 1981	House	Located in the corner at the top of Park Street, adjoining the Bull Hotel.	1010	Upload Photo
Bryn y Parc	Denbigh; SJ0534866085; 53°11′00″N 3°25′04″W	24 October 1950		Towards the top of park Street immediately adjacent to No 1; fronting directly onto the road, but with enclosed grounds to NE.	1011	Upload Photo
Former House of Thomas Gee, including decorative railings to raised terrace on R	Denbigh; SJ0531866166; 53°11′03″N 3°25′06″W	30 November 1966		On the corner with Chapel Street.	1022	Former House of Thomas Gee, including decorative railings to raised terrace on R
Y Gelli (formerly Grove House and also Ty Nant)	Denbigh; SJ0548566289; 53°11′07″N 3°24′57″W	24 October 1950		Set back from the road behind a low-walled forecourt.	1033	Upload Photo
Pierce's Memorial	Denbigh; SJ0562766326; 53°11′08″N 3°24′50″W	24 October 1950		Within the Evan Pierce Memorial Garden, set back from the street opposite Somerfield's supermarket; the monument stands in a square, gravelled enclosure with stone kerbing (formerly railed).	1049	Pierce's Memorial
Foxhall including adjoining Garden and Yard Walls to the SE and SW	Henllan; SJ0333567483; 53°11′44″N 3°26′54″W	24 October 1950		Located within its own grounds approximately 1.5 km SE of Henllan; accessed via a long track running W from the Denbigh to Henllan road.	1054	Upload Photo
Garn	Henllan; SJ0249368709; 53°12′23″N 3°27′41″W	24 October 1950		Located within its own park at the NW boundary of the community, approximately 1km N of Henllan village; accessed via a drive running N from the road.	1057	Upload Photo
Gwaenynog	Denbigh; SJ0349865391; 53°10′37″N 3°26′43″W	24 October 1950		Located approximately 1km SW of Denbigh within its own park, set back to the S of the road and accessed via its own drive.	1058	See more images
Lleweni Hall, including Stables to the NE	Denbigh; SJ0819968511; 53°12′21″N 3°22′33″W	24 October 1950		Situated in its own grounds to the north-east of Denbigh, close to the boundary with Aberwheeler Community. Reached by long drives off the lane from Brookhouse to Waen and from the Mold Road.	1060	See more images
Carriage Yard to west of Lleweni Hall	Denbigh; SJ0802768571; 53°12′22″N 3°22′43″W	24 October 1950		On elevated site to west of Lleweni Hall which is situated to the north-east of Denbigh and reached by long drives off the lane from Brookhouse to Waen and from the Mold Road.	1061	Carriage Yard to west of Lleweni Hall
Plas Chambres, including adjoining forecourt and garden walls	Denbigh; SJ0468068170; 53°12′07″N 3°25′43″W	24 October 1950		Located towards the western boundary of the community approximately 2km NW of Denbigh; on a sloping site, set back behind a series of ancillary buildings at the cross-roads of the Denbigh to Trefnant road with the lane leading W towards Henllan.	1063	Upload Photo
Plas Clough	Denbigh; SJ0578867738; 53°11′54″N 3°24′42″W	24 October 1950		Located approximately 1.2km N of Denbigh, set back to the W of the Denbigh-St Asaph road on a slight rise and set within its own park.	1064	See more images
Plas Heaton	Henllan; SJ0310669166; 53°12′39″N 3°27′08″W	24 October 1950		Located within its own park on an elevated site at the northern boundary of the community; accessed via a lodged and gated drive running S from the road.	1065	Upload Photo
Parish Church of St Sadwrn including adjacent Cross Shaft	Henllan; SJ0223468181; 53°12′06″N 3°27′54″W	24 October 1950		Located at the western perimeter of the village within its own walled churchyard.	1071	See more images
Detached Belfry Tower at the Church of St Sadwrn	Henllan; SJ0226968189; 53°12′06″N 3°27′52″W	24 October 1950		Prominently-sited at the cross-roads, at the NE boundary of the churchyard.	1073	Detached Belfry Tower at the Church of St Sadwrn
Plas Newydd	Llangollen; SJ2181741719; 52°58′02″N 3°09′56″W	24 April 1951		Set in its own grounds at the top of a secluded glen on the SE edge of the town. Topiary along front wall. Today the main gated entry is near the junction with Bache Mill Road.	1127	See more images
T-shaped range to rear of Pengwern Hall, including vauled undercroft, Pengwern Vale	Llangollen; SJ2246641114; 52°57′42″N 3°09′21″W	24 April 1951			1256	Upload Photo
Tŷ'n-Dŵr, Tŷ'n-Dŵr Road, Pengwern Vale	Llangollen; SJ2315641321; 52°57′49″N 3°08′44″W	22 December 1989			1258	Tŷ'n-Dŵr, Tŷ'n-Dŵr Road, Pengwern Vale
Bryn Dethol	Llangollen; SJ2393041374; 52°57′52″N 3°08′02″W	30 August 1985		Situated on hillside south of A5 road, about 2.5 km east of Llangollen, and approached up a steep track through former farmyard.	1313	Upload Photo
Llantysilio Hall	Llantysilio; SJ1914343685; 52°59′04″N 3°12′21″W	22 May 1989		The house is set in 4ha of grounds above the River Dee, NW of Llantysilio Church, on the road from Pentrefelin to Rhewl. It is in the historic township of Maes-yr-ychain and is reached by a driveway from the road.	1319	Llantysilio Hall
Ruthin Castle Hotel	Ruthin; SJ1224757976; 53°06′42″N 3°18′45″W	24 October 1950			1347	Ruthin Castle Hotel
Old Rectory	Llanbedr Dyffryn Clwyd; SJ1404959832; 53°07′43″N 3°17′10″W	19 July 1966		Set in its own grounds approximately 0.5km NW of Llanbedr Dyffryn Clwyd, with drive entrance close to a bend on the road.	1352	See more images
Faenol Fawr	Bodelwyddan; SJ0009076395; 53°16′30″N 3°29′59″W	24 September 1951		500m W of the Bodelwyddan to Rhuddlan road, near NW corner of Ysbyty Glan Clwyd.	1357	See more images
Faenol-bach with Domestic Boundary Walls	Bodelwyddan; SH9879776245; 53°16′25″N 3°31′09″W	24 September 1951		To S side of an unclassified road from Terfyn to Glan-y-morfa, 1km N of Bodelwyddan School. Domestic site separated from farmyard by a low wall; wall also at entrance	1358	Upload Photo
Dyserth Hall	Dyserth; SJ0544379820; 53°18′25″N 3°25′14″W	24 September 1951		At the corner of Ffordd Talargoch and Dyserth Road. Stone-walled forecourt with iron gate and rails; stone-walled drive from road. Garden to S and W, farmyard (now converted to domestic units) to N.	1360	Upload Photo
Brynbella	Tremeirchion; SJ0819372443; 53°14′28″N 3°22′38″W	24 September 1951		To south west of Tremeirchion village in extensive private grounds. Approach at east side, landscaped park and garden terracing at west side.	1373	Upload Photo
Bach-y-graig Farmhouse	Tremeirchion; SJ0752171264; 53°13′49″N 3°23′13″W	24 September 1951		About 2 km south-west of Tremerchion Parish Church. Bachygraig is approached from the Denbigh side by a private lane starting at Pont-y-Cambwll. Older farmyard buildings at left, terraced lawn at front.	1374	Upload Photo
Henblas Hall	Tremeirchion; SJ0838071894; 53°14′10″N 3°22′27″W	24 September 1951		At west side of the B5429 Tremeirchion to Bodfari Road, 1 km south of Tremeirchion Parish Church	1375	Henblas Hall
Bodeugan Farmhouse	Waen; SJ0570774828; 53°15′43″N 3°24′54″W	24 September 1951		2 km east of St Asaph, about 100 m south of the A55, reached by a lane west of the Rhuddlan/Trefnant minor road.	1376	Upload Photo
St Margaret's Church, Bodelwyddan (the "Marble Church")	Bodelwyddan; SJ0039875460; 53°16′00″N 3°29′41″W	16 November 1962		At N side of the former St Asaph road now bypassed by the adjacent A55. Low perimeter wall separately listed.	1377	See more images
Gwernigron Dovecote	Bodelwyddan; SJ0251975165; 53°15′52″N 3°27′47″W	16 November 1962		In Gwernigron farmyard.	1382	Gwernigron Dovecote
Bodelwyddan Castle	Bodelwyddan; SH9992374830; 53°15′40″N 3°30′06″W	16 November 1962		Conspicuously site on rising ground 4km W of St Asaph and 1km S of Bodelwyddan Village, in extensive private grounds enclosed within a perimeter park wall.	1383	See more images
Bodelwyddan Castle Ice House	Bodelwyddan; SH9980675027; 53°15′46″N 3°30′13″W	16 November 1962		200m NW of Bodelwyddan Castle and 50m NE of Mine Cottage (in area of car parks).	1384	Upload Photo
Pen-isa'r-Glascoed Farmhouse with Garden Wall and Gate	Bodelwyddan; SH9929574506; 53°15′29″N 3°30′40″W	16 November 1962			1385	Upload Photo
St Stephen's Church	Bodfari; SJ0925470117; 53°13′13″N 3°21′38″W	16 November 1962		At the centre of Bodfari Village, approached by a lychgate and long flight of steps. The orientation of the church is north east, but conventional orientation is assumed in this description. Stone churchyard wall.	1386	See more images
Church of Saints Mael and Sulien	Cwm; SJ0662377465; 53°17′09″N 3°24′08″W	16 November 1962		In the village of Cwm, 0.5 km east of the Cwm (Dyserth to Rhuallt) road. Stone churchyard wall with gate at west. The Vicarage site encroaches on the churchyard at south, and shares the roadside wall.	1389	See more images
Pentre Cwm	Cwm; SJ0618777910; 53°17′23″N 3°24′32″W	16 November 1962		At the fork of the Cwm Road and the minor road to Marian Cwm, near the southern fringe of the village of Dyserth. Terracing and retaining walls of site much altered in recent restorations. Former farm buildings of Pentre Cwm farm are to the north.	1391	Upload Photo
Plas-is-llan	Cwm; SJ0543477226; 53°17′01″N 3°25′12″W	16 November 1962		About 1 km west of Cwm Parish Church. The house faces south to a small stone-walled forecourt, and is flanked by its barns	1392	Upload Photo
Pwllhalog farmhouse	Cwm; SJ0880577713; 53°17′19″N 3°22′10″W	16 November 1962		To the south-east corner of Pwllhalog farmstead, about 2 km east of Cwm Parish Church; the house is within a stone-walled enclosure.	1393	Upload Photo
St Bridge's Church, Dyserth	Dyserth; SJ0561379387; 53°18′11″N 3°25′04″W	16 November 1962		At the centre of the village of Dyserth, within a large churchyard. Stone churchyard wall with triangular coping; steel gates to west, north and south.	1394	See more images
Gatepiers of former entrance to Bodwyddan Hall, Bodelwyddan	Rhuddlan; SJ0459478578; 53°17′44″N 3°25′58″W	16 November 1962			1396	Upload Photo
St Mary's Church	Rhuddlan; SJ0214278098; 53°17′27″N 3°28′10″W	16 November 1962			1400	See more images
Rhuddlan Bridge	Rhuddlan; SJ0217977991; 53°17′23″N 3°28′08″W	16 November 1962		Spans the river Clwyd to form the only access to the town from the W.	1402	See more images
St Mary's Well, Bodrhyddan	Rhuddlan; SJ0450978763; 53°17′50″N 3°26′03″W	16 November 1962			1403	Upload Photo
Main barn at Abbey Farm, Abbey Road (East side)	Rhuddlan; SJ0292377484; 53°17′08″N 3°27′27″W	16 November 1962			1404	Upload Photo
Church of Corpus Christi (Holy Trinity)	Tremeirchion; SJ0828273084; 53°14′49″N 3°22′34″W	16 November 1962		In the village of Tremeirchion. The churchyard (extended 1864) is walled in similar stone without coping; gate to west, lychgate to south; war memorial to west.	1408	See more images
Bach-y-graig South East Farm Range	Tremeirchion; SJ0746071263; 53°13′49″N 3°23′16″W	16 November 1962		In the farmyard of Bach-y-graig	1412	Upload Photo
Dovecote at Bodeugan Farm	Waen; SJ0567474825; 53°15′43″N 3°24′56″W	16 November 1962		In field to west of Bodeugan farmstead	1418	Upload Photo
St Thomas's Church	Rhyl; SJ0100981514; 53°19′17″N 3°29′15″W	21 June 1949	Parish church	Prominently sited on the corner with Bath Street.	1422	See more images
St Melyd's Church, Meliden	Prestatyn; SJ0629381097; 53°19′07″N 3°24′29″W	19 June 1950		In the village of Meliden, at the north junction of Ffordd Talargoch with Meliden Road.	1424	See more images
St Asaph Bridge, High Street	St Asaph; SJ0353574243; 53°15′23″N 3°26′51″W	16 November 1962			1445	Upload Photo
St Kentigen and St Asaph's Church, High Street	St Asaph; SJ0368774314; 53°15′25″N 3°26′43″W	16 November 1962	Parish church		1447	See more images
The Old Palace, High Street	St Asaph; SJ0373174211; 53°15′22″N 3°26′40″W	16 November 1962			1469	Upload Photo
Esgobty farmhouse, Upper Denbigh Road	St Asaph; SJ0376674167; 53°15′21″N 3°26′38″W	16 November 1962			1487	Upload Photo
Plas yn y pentre	Llangollen; SJ2620741393; 52°57′53″N 3°06′00″W	6 September 1952		Situated in the Vale of Llangollen on by-road between Trevor and Trevor Uchaf, approximately 1km SW of Pont Cysylltau.	1546	Plas yn y pentre
Terfyn Farmhouse	Cwm; SJ0827378210; 53°17′34″N 3°22′39″W	16 November 1962		About 2 km north-east of Cwm Parish Church	14645	Upload Photo
Cowhouse at Abbey Farm, Abbey Road (East side)	Rhuddlan; SJ0293477500; 53°17′08″N 3°27′27″W	16 November 1962			14971	Upload Photo
Workshop range at Abbey Farm, Abbey Road (East side)	Rhuddlan; SJ0289877489; 53°17′08″N 3°27′29″W	16 November 1962			14972	Upload Photo
Churchyard walls, gravestones, chest-tombs and railings at the Church of St Mael and St Sulien	Corwen; SJ0793043414; 52°58′49″N 3°22′22″W	2 January 1995			15513	Upload Photo
Attached former farm buildings to Blaenddol house, Blaen y Ddol	Corwen; SJ0269744506; 52°59′21″N 3°27′04″W	20 October 1966			15541	Upload Photo
Pool Park	Efenechtyd; SJ0983255575; 53°05′23″N 3°20′52″W	15 April 1994		Located at the W boundary of the community, approximately 5km SW of Ruthin; accessed via a long drive running westwards from the road by a lodge.	16180	See more images
St Peter's Church	Llanbedr Dyffryn Clwyd; SJ1443759404; 53°07′30″N 3°16′48″W	21 December 1995		At the junction of the A494 and the B 5429, set within its own walled churchyard.	16593	See more images
Holy Trinity Church	Trefnant; SJ0499370534; 53°13′24″N 3°25′28″W	1 September 1998		Located at the south-western edge of the village, set back within its churchyard to the NW of the Henllan to Trefnant Road.	19186	See more images
No 2 Llannerch Hall	Trefnant; SJ0541372310; 53°14′22″N 3°25′07″W	6 February 1983		Set in its own mature parkland at the northern edge of the community, approximately 1km N of Trefnant village; accessed via a long drive running NE from the A 525 St. Asaph to Denbigh road.	19187	Upload Photo
No 3 Llannerch Hall	Trefnant; SJ0541172312; 53°14′22″N 3°25′08″W	6 February 1983		Set in its own mature parkland at the northern edge of the community, approximately 1km N of Trefnant village; accessed via a long drive running NE from the A 525 St. Asaph to Denbigh road.	19188	Upload Photo
No 4 Llannerch Hall	Trefnant; SJ0540972315; 53°14′22″N 3°25′08″W	6 February 1983		Set in its own mature parkland at the northern edge of the community, approximately 1km N of Trefnant village; accessed via a long drive running NE from the A 525 St. Asaph to Denbigh road.	19189	Upload Photo
No 5 Llannerch Hall	Trefnant; SJ0540872317; 53°14′22″N 3°25′08″W	6 February 1983		Set in its own mature parkland at the northern edge of the community, approximately 1km N of Trefnant village; accessed via a long drive running NE from the A 525 St. Asaph to Denbigh road.	19190	Upload Photo
No 6 Llannerch Hall	Trefnant; SJ0540672319; 53°14′22″N 3°25′08″W	6 February 1983		Set in its own mature parkland at the northern edge of the community, approximately 1km N of Trefnant village; accessed via a long drive running NE from the A 525 St. Asaph to Denbigh road.	19191	Upload Photo
No 7 Llannerch Hall	Trefnant; SJ0540572321; 53°14′22″N 3°25′08″W	6 February 1983		Set in its own mature parkland at the northern edge of the community, approximately 1km N of Trefnant village; accessed via a long drive running NE from the A 525 St. Asaph to Denbigh road.	19192	Upload Photo
No 8 Llannerch Hall	Trefnant; SJ0540472323; 53°14′22″N 3°25′08″W	6 February 1983		Set in its own mature parkland at the northern edge of the community, approximately 1km N of Trefnant village; accessed via a long drive running NE from the A 525 St. Asaph to Denbigh road.	19193	Upload Photo
No 9 Llannerch Hall	Trefnant; SJ0540372325; 53°14′22″N 3°25′08″W	6 February 1983		Set in its own mature parkland at the northern edge of the community, approximately 1km N of Trefnant village; accessed via a long drive running NE from the A 525 St. Asaph to Denbigh road.	19194	Upload Photo
No 10 Llannerch Hall	Trefnant; SJ0540272327; 53°14′22″N 3°25′08″W	6 February 1983		Set in its own mature parkland at the northern edge of the community, approximately 1km N of Trefnant village; accessed via a long drive running NE from the A 525 St. Asaph to Denbigh road.	19195	Upload Photo
No 11 Llannerch Hall	Trefnant; SJ0540172329; 53°14′22″N 3°25′08″W	6 February 1983		Set in its own mature parkland at the northern edge of the community, approximately 1km N of Trefnant village; accessed via a long drive running NE from the A 525 St. Asaph to Denbigh road.	19196	Upload Photo
No 12 Llannerch Hall	Trefnant; SJ0539672311; 53°14′22″N 3°25′08″W	6 February 1983		Set in its own mature parkland at the northern edge of the community, approximately 1km N of Trefnant village; accessed via a long drive running NE from the A 525 St. Asaph to Denbigh road.	19197	Upload Photo
No 13 Llannerch Hall	Trefnant; SJ0539972332; 53°14′22″N 3°25′08″W	6 February 1983		Set in its own mature parkland at the northern edge of the community, approximately 1km N of Trefnant village; accessed via a long drive running NE from the A 525 St. Asaph to Denbigh road.	19198	Upload Photo
Dolbelidr	Trefnant; SJ0309570926; 53°13′36″N 3°27′11″W	1 September 1998		Located at the NE boundary of the community, approximately 1.2km NE of Trefnant village; sited on the SE side of the unclassified road from Trefnant to Tremeirchion, set back in its own grounds with a large metalled forecourt.	19212	Upload Photo
St Tysilio's Church	Llantysilio; SJ1941143554; 52°59′00″N 3°12′07″W	6 July 1963		The church stands in a very picturesque location set in a walled churchyard above the River Dee and below the road to Rhewl, c3km W of Llangollen.	19688	See more images
Plas-uchaf	Llantysilio; SJ2291647979; 53°01′25″N 3°09′02″W	6 September 1952		The house is set at the head of a narrow valley, on the mountain road to Minera.	19695	Upload Photo
Wigfair Hall	Cefnmeiriadog; SJ0277771228; 53°13′45″N 3°27′28″W	6 February 1998		On a commanding site above the Elwy valley at the south-eastern edge of the community, approximately 2km SE of Cefn Meiriadog village; accessed via a tree-lined drive leading S from an unclassified lane running SE from the village.	19925	Wigfair Hall
Ffynnon Fair	Cefnmeiriadog; SJ0291371072; 53°13′40″N 3°27′21″W	6 February 1998		Located in a picturesque setting in a field on the N bank of the river Elwy at the SE boundary of the community.	19933	Upload Photo
Primary House at Pwll Callod	Efenechtyd; SJ1193754254; 53°04′42″N 3°18′58″W	25 January 1999		Located on a rise approximately 800m SE of Pwll-Glas towards the SE boundary of the community. Accessed from the main road via a track running E. The house is sited on a revetted platform above the farmyard, at right-angles to the present farmhouse.	21225	Upload Photo
Churchyard Cross Shaft at St Meugan's Church	Llanbedr Dyffryn Clwyd; SJ1400057770; 53°06′37″N 3°17′10″W	24 June 1999		Located in the churchyard, to the S of the church.	21925	Upload Photo
Ty Mawr	Gwyddelwern; SJ0752846711; 53°00′35″N 3°22′47″W	11 May 1999		Aligned with main street of village, about 75m NE of Church of St Beuno.	22666	See more images
Gwasg Gee Printing Works	Denbigh; SJ0527066231; 53°11′05″N 3°25′09″W	20 July 2000		On the street-line, the main ranges enclosing a courtyard to the rear.	23580	Gwasg Gee Printing Works
Town Hall	Denbigh; SJ0522966155; 53°11′03″N 3°25′11″W	20 July 2000		Prominently sited on the corner of the square with Crown Lane.	23591	See more images
Summerhouse in the garden of Grovehurst	Denbigh; SJ0545966348; 53°11′09″N 3°24′59″W	20 July 2000		In the garden of Grovehurst.	23606	Upload Photo
Secondary House at Plas Chambres	Denbigh; SJ0469868140; 53°12′06″N 3°25′42″W	20 July 2000		Located immediately SE of the main house on the SW side of the cobbled former service court.	23649	Upload Photo
Garthgynan Mill	Llanfair Dyffryn Clwyd; SJ1437655141; 53°05′12″N 3°16′48″W	19 May 2001		250 metres south-west of Garthgynon farmhouse, to the west side of the Dwr Ial stream.	25206	Upload Photo
Garden Walls with Privy, Pavilion and Cottage at Garthgynan	Llanfair Dyffryn Clwyd; SJ1429855357; 53°05′19″N 3°16′52″W	19 May 2001		To south side of Garthgynan farmhouse	25211	Upload Photo
Stables at Garthgynan	Llanfair Dyffryn Clwyd; SJ1421555386; 53°05′20″N 3°16′56″W	19 May 2001		West of Garthgynan farmhouse, across farm track.	25216	Upload Photo
Tomb group in St Bridget's Churchyard	Dyserth; SJ0563279380; 53°18′11″N 3°25′03″W	12 October 2001		About 10 m south-east of the chancel of Dyserth Church.	25955	Tomb group in St Bridget's Churchyard
Hooded tomb in the churchyard of Saints Mael and Sulien	Cwm; SJ0663577463; 53°17′09″N 3°24′07″W	1 November 2002		Adjacent to the south wall of the St Mael & St Sulien's church.	26087	Upload Photo
St Beuno's College	Tremeirchion; SJ0798974229; 53°15′25″N 3°22′51″W	4 September 2002		On high ground to the east of the B5249 Cwm to Bodfari road	26459	See more images
Candy Mill with Miller's Cottage and Leat	Aberwheeler; SJ1082271617; 53°14′03″N 3°20′15″W	20 May 2002		To east of the River Aberwheeler near Ty Draw farm, reached by a minor road from the A541. Leat from the river about 400 m to the north feeding a small pond to its east, the tailwater carried back to the river by an underground culvert to the west.	26643	Upload Photo
Faenol Fawr Dovecote	Bodelwyddan; SJ0007576397; 53°16′30″N 3°30′00″W	24 September 1951		Attached to rear wing of Faenol Fawr.	80742	Faenol Fawr Dovecote
Pont Melin Rug	Cynwyd; SJ0504643529; 52°58′50″N 3°24′57″W	20 October 1966		Carries the A5 over the River Alwen approx. 2 km W of Corwen.	82411	Upload Photo
Ty Gwyn	Ruthin; SJ1118157711; 53°06′33″N 3°19′42″W	30 December 2005		Located in Llanfwrog village, approximately 200m SW of the church.	87353	Ty Gwyn
Farm outbuildings at Hengoed	Cyffylliog; SJ0929758519; 53°06′58″N 3°21′24″W	29 January 2007		Between Bontuchel and Llanfwrog, about 200m N of bend in minor road. Aligned SW-NE facing farmhouse which is to SE.	87518	Upload Photo

== See also ==
- Grade I listed buildings in Denbighshire
