= Castle Hotel =

Castle Hotel may refer to:

- Castle Hotel, Aberaeron, Wales
- Castle Hotel, Castleton, England
- Castle Hotel, Conwy, Wales
- Castle Hotel, Halton, England
- Castle Hotel, Manchester, England
- Castle Hotel, Ruthin, Wales
- Castle Hotel, Taunton, England
- Castle Hotel, York, Western Australia
- Castle Hotel & Spa, Tarrytown, New York, U.S.
