= Townshend Mainwaring =

British politician (1807-1883)

Townshend Mainwaring MP JP

Member of Parliament for Denbigh Boroughs
- In office 31 March 1857 – 19 November 1868
- Preceded by: Frederick Richard West
- Succeeded by: Charles James Watkin Williams
- In office 3 July 1841 – 29 July 1847
- Preceded by: Wilson Jones
- Succeeded by: Frederick Richard West

Personal details
- Born: 16 March 1807 Ellesmere, Shropshire, England
- Died: 25 December 1883 (aged 76) Galltfaenan Hall, Trefnant, Denbighshire, Wales
- Party: Conservative
- Spouse: Anna Maria Salusbury (m. 1837)
- Children: 4
- Parent(s): Charles Mainwaring; Sarah Townshend
- Education: Rugby School
- Alma mater: Brasenose College, Oxford

Townshend Mainwaring (16 March 1807 – 25 December 1883) was a British Conservative Party politician.

== Family ==
Townshend Mainwaring was born on 16 March 1807. He was the second son of the Reverend Charles Mainwaring, of Oteley Park, Ellesmere, Shropshire, and Sarah Susannah Townshend, daughter of John Townshend of Hem, Denbighshire. He attended Rugby School and then Brasenose College, Oxford. (Note: Hem is probably Hem House, in Rossett, near Wrexham.)

Mainwaring married Anna Maria Salusbury, the eldest daughter of Colonel John Lloyd Salusbury of Galltfaenan Hall, in February 1837, at which time Mainwaring was living at Marchwiel Hall. The couple went on to have two sons – Charles Salusbury Mainwaring and Reginald Kynaston Mainwaring – and two daughters.

== Political career ==
Mainwaring became a magistrate in December 1837. Subsequently, he became the first of his family to be elected MP since George Mainwaring (1642-1695). Described as a Liberal Conservative and a Peelite, he was first elected for Denbigh Boroughs in 1841 but stood down at the 1847 election. He returned to parliament for the same seat in 1857 and held it until 1868.

== Other activities ==
In 1840, Mainwaring was High Sheriff of Denbighshire, and he was also at some point a Justice of the Peace for Denbighshire and the first Major of the Denbighshire Rifle Volunteers. He was one of the chairmen of the National Eisteddfod of Wales when it was held at Ruthin in 1868, days after sustaining severe injuries to his leg when his horse fell on him, and was involved with other similar events, including that at Rhyl in 1863. Considered to be a good musician, he also composed music.

Mainwaring, who lived at Galltfaenan Hall in Denbighshire after his marriage, had a considerable involvement with the Vale of Clwyd Railway, was involved with the North Wales Narrow Gauge Railways, and supported the construction of the Chester and Holyhead Railway. He continued to own Marchwiel until his death at Galltfaenan on 25 December 1883, and also property and lands in other places. (Note: An example of other property owned by Mainwaring was Foryd Hall in Rhyl, which he had built and which was demolished due to being unsafe just before World War II. Rhyl Pleasure Beach now covers the site.) An obituary noted his benevolent financing of the construction of a church, parsonage, and schools in Trefnant, in memory of his father-in-law, as well as a convalescent home for men in Rhyl. He was also noted to be a supporter of a women's home in Rhyl and of the same town's Royal Alexandra Hospital. He was buried at Trefnant's Holy Trinity church.

Parliament of the United Kingdom
| Preceded by Frederick Richard West | Member of Parliament for Denbigh Boroughs; 1857–1868 | Succeeded by Watkin Williams |
| Preceded by Wilson Jones | Member of Parliament for Denbigh Boroughs; 1841–1847 | Succeeded by Frederick Richard West |
