= Llannerch railway station =

Former private railway station in Denbighshire, Wales

Llannerch
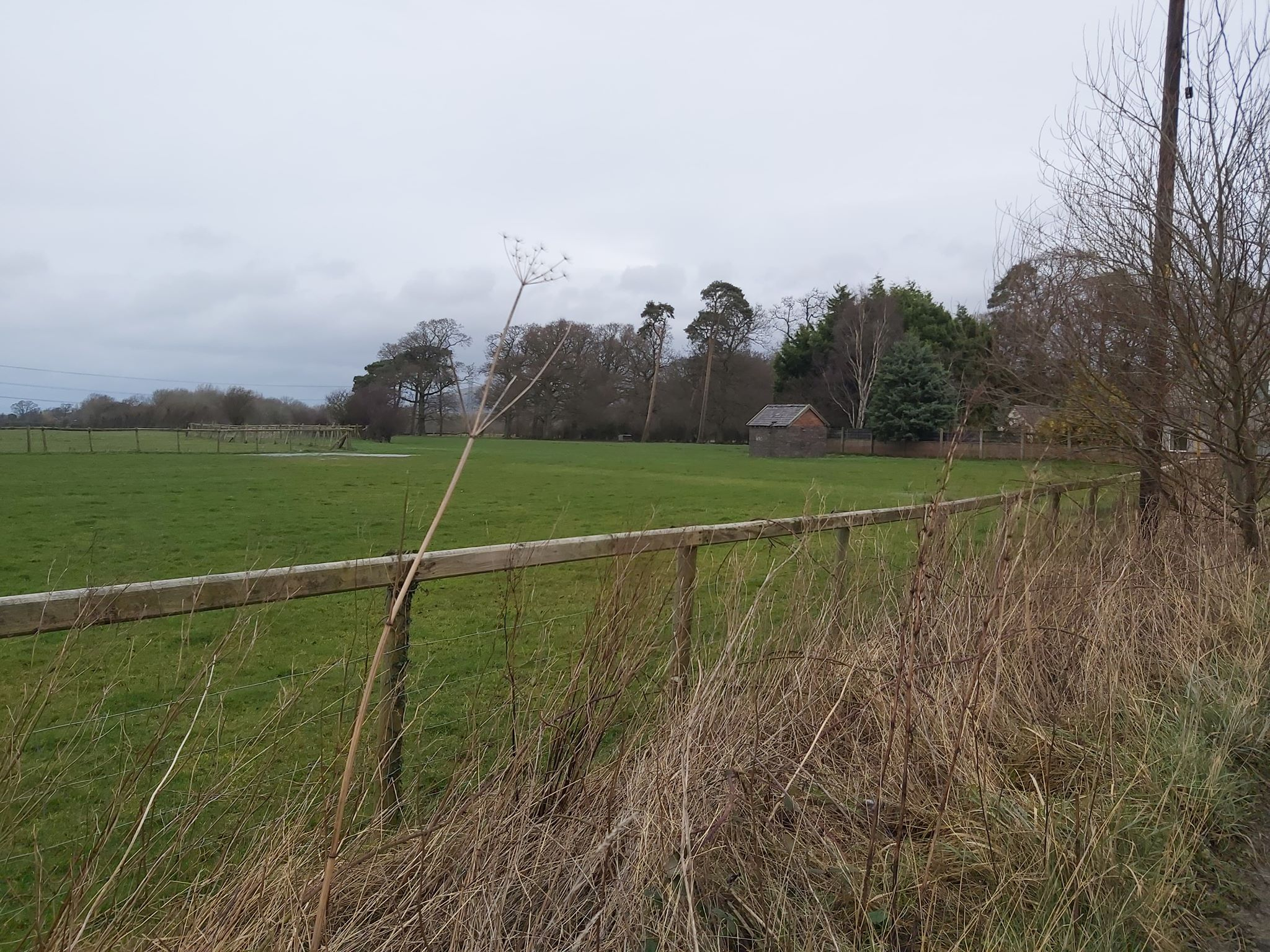

General information
- Location: Trefnant, Denbighshire; Wales
- Coordinates: 53°14′19″N 3°25′46″W
- Grid reference: SJ047722
- Platforms: 1

Other information
- Status: Disused

History
- Original company: Vale of Clwyd Railway
- Pre-grouping: London & North Western Railway

Key dates
- 5 October 1858: Opened
- December 1871: Closed
Location

Llannerch railway station was a private railway station on the Vale of Clwyd Railway in Wales. It was located close to Llannerch Hall, the home of Whitehall Dod who was a director of the Vale of Clwyd Railway company. From the opening of the line in October 1858 Dod had the right to stop trains for his use at this location until December 1871 when Dod's privilege expired, the railway having been acquired by the London & North Western Railway in 1867.

Preceding station	Disused railways	Following station
Trefnant	London and North Western Railway; Vale of Clwyd Railway	St Asaph
