= Benjamin Piercy =

British civil engineer (1827–1888)

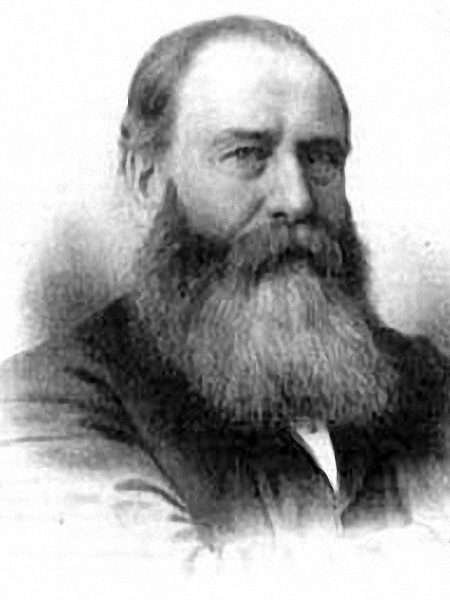
- Benjamin Piercy
- Born: 16 March 1827; Trefeglwys, Wales
- Died: 24 March 1888 (aged 61); London, England
- Occupation: Civil engineer
- Years active: 1847–1888
- Spouse: Sarah Davies (m. 1855)
- Children: 9

Benjamin Piercy (16 March 1827 – 24 March 1888) was a civil engineer. He developed railway lines in Wales, Sardinia (now Italy), France and India and is also well known as an agrarian businessman and entrepreneur.

== Early life ==
Benjamin was born on 16 March 1827 in Trefeglwys. Initially trained in his father's office. His father Robert Benjamin, was a land surveyor operating in the Counties of Montgomery, Denbigh and Flint and a business partner of Brunel.

== Career ==
After achieving his degree in Civil Engineering in 1847, Benjamin became Chief Assistant to Charles Mickleburgh, surveyor and land-agent in Montgomeryshire. In this position, he found himself involved with the Welsh railways.

In 1851, Henry Robertson, sought his assistance to prepare plans for the Shrewsbury and Chester Railway line, and later for a railway from Oswestry to Newtown. His success in getting parliamentary approval for the latter line despite a strong opposition from rival entrepreneurs boosted his reputation as a technical expert in railways and since then he became involved in almost every running rail project in Wales.

Some notable pieces of engineering he delivered during this period are the Talerddig trench, the bridges over the Severn estuary, the Mawddach and the Traeth Bychan rivers and the fine stations at Oswestry and Welshpool.

=== Activity in foreign countries ===
==== France ====
In 1863, with Savin and the Count of Monthiers, he won the approval for the construction of the Vendée railways from Tours to Sables d'Olonne.

==== Italy ====
In 1863 he began a long term project, in cooperation with the Royal Sardinian Railway Company, involving the planning and renovation of the standard and narrow gauge lines on the island of Sardinia, and the construction of a harbour in Golfo Aranci. He acquired large estates in Sardinia, where his descendants still live today, and highly contributed to improving the agricultural techniques on the island as well as the breeding techniques of cattle, horses, and sheep.

After the approval, in 1865, of the Law on ademprivi, Piercy received as a reward for his various activities in Sardinia a farmland in Macomer, where he began the construction of one of the most modern farms at the time with the introduction of efficient livestock management, including breeds of horses and cows hitherto unknown to the island. He settled in an area called Badde Salighes ("willows valley" in Sardinian language) where he built Villa Piercy, a building shaped like a four-sided castle, together with a village of forty houses, which accommodated 97 settlers and 210 inhabitants. He became an intimate friend of Garibaldi, whose son, Ricciotti, became his pupil. His services to Sardinia were recognized by his appointment as a Commendatore of the Crown of Italy in 1882. Ricciotti also was his assistant in the development of some Indian railway lines.

==== India ====
Piercy was the Head Engineer in the development of the Assam Railway in India, and projected its extension into Burma. In 1884, during the construction works in Assam, he named a village Margherita in reference to the Italian Queen Margherita.

== Personal life and death ==
In 1855 he married Sarah Davies and moved to Wrexham in North Wales. Sarah gave him three sons and six daughters. On 8 January 1861 he was elected Chairman of the Institution of Civil Engineers.

In 1881 he purchased the Marchwiel Hall estate, and for the last remaining years of his life he devoted much of his attention to the revitalisation of the railways in North Wales, consolidating their finances, and planning extensions for exploiting the local mineral resources.

He died in London on 24 March 1888, and was buried in Kensal Green Cemetery next to his wife Sarah Davies.
