= Rhuddlan railway station =

Former railway station in Wales

Coordinates: 53.2874°N 3.4719°W

Rhuddlan

General information
- Location: Rhuddlan, Denbighshire; Wales
- Platforms: 1

Other information
- Status: Disused

History
- Original company: Vale of Clwyd Railway
- Pre-grouping: London and North Western Railway
- Post-grouping: London, Midland and Scottish Railway

Key dates
- 5 October 1858: Opened
- 19 September 1955: Closed
Location

Rhuddlan was a railway station located in Rhuddlan, Denbighshire. It first opened in 1858 as part of the Vale of Clwyd Railway, and afterwards under the auspices of several different companies. The station closed to passengers on 19 September 1955, some seven years after nationalisation.

== History ==
The railway at Rhuddlan opened on 5 October 1858 as part of the Vale of Clwyd Railway, which connected with the station at Rhyl railway station for the Chester and Holyhead Railway. At opening, Rhuddlan station had a single platform on the east side of the line. While there was a passing loop for trains, this did not have a platform for a second train to stop. The station building was brick built, while a goods store on the platform was constructed out of wood. The platform storage was increased in 1879, when a second room was built.

Access was provided by the road towards Abergele, which passed over the tracks south of the station via a railway bridge. There were steps down from the bridge directly onto the platform for foot passengers, while a side road was constructed for vehicles. There was a near disaster in June 1921 when a car came off the bridge and went down a steep bank, ending a few feet short of the platform just prior to the arrival of a train.

The London and North Western Railway took control of the Vale of Clwyd Railway in 1864, and absorbed it into its services on 15 July 1867. They were absorbed into the London, Midland and Scottish Railway in 1924. When nationalisation took place in 1948, the station formed part of British Railways London Midland Region.

The station was host to a LMS caravan from 1934 to 1939. Camping coaches were also positioned here by the London Midland Region from 1955 to 1968; most years there were four coaches, but only three in 1957 and 1958 and just two in 1955.

It closed to passenger services on 19 September 1955. Trains continued to pass through the station until the line was closed on 1 January 1968, with the track lifted shortly afterwards.

== Site today ==
The station was demolished and only some fence posts and steps down from the road bridge remain.

Preceding station	Disused railways	Following station
Foryd	London and North Western Railway; Vale of Clwyd Railway	St Asaph
