= Wilson Jones (politician) =

Welsh politician

Wilson Jones (3 July 1795 – 27 October 1864) was a Welsh politician.

Born at Cefn Coch in Denbighshire, Jones served in the 2nd Dragoon Guards. He became a magistrate for Denbighshire and Flintshire, a deputy lieutenant, and in 1831 served as High Sheriff of Denbighshire.

At the 1835 UK general election, Jones stood in Denbigh Boroughs for the Conservative Party. He won the seat, and held it at the 1837 UK general election, before standing down in 1841.

Civic offices
Preceded by William Hanmer	High Sheriff of Denbighshire; 1831	Succeeded by Edward Lloyd
Parliament of the United Kingdom
Preceded by John Madocks	Member of Parliament for Denbigh Boroughs; 1835–1841	Succeeded by Townshend Mainwaring
