= Holy Trinity Church, Trefnant =

Listed church in Denbighshire, Wales

Coordinates: 53°13′23″N 3°25′28″W

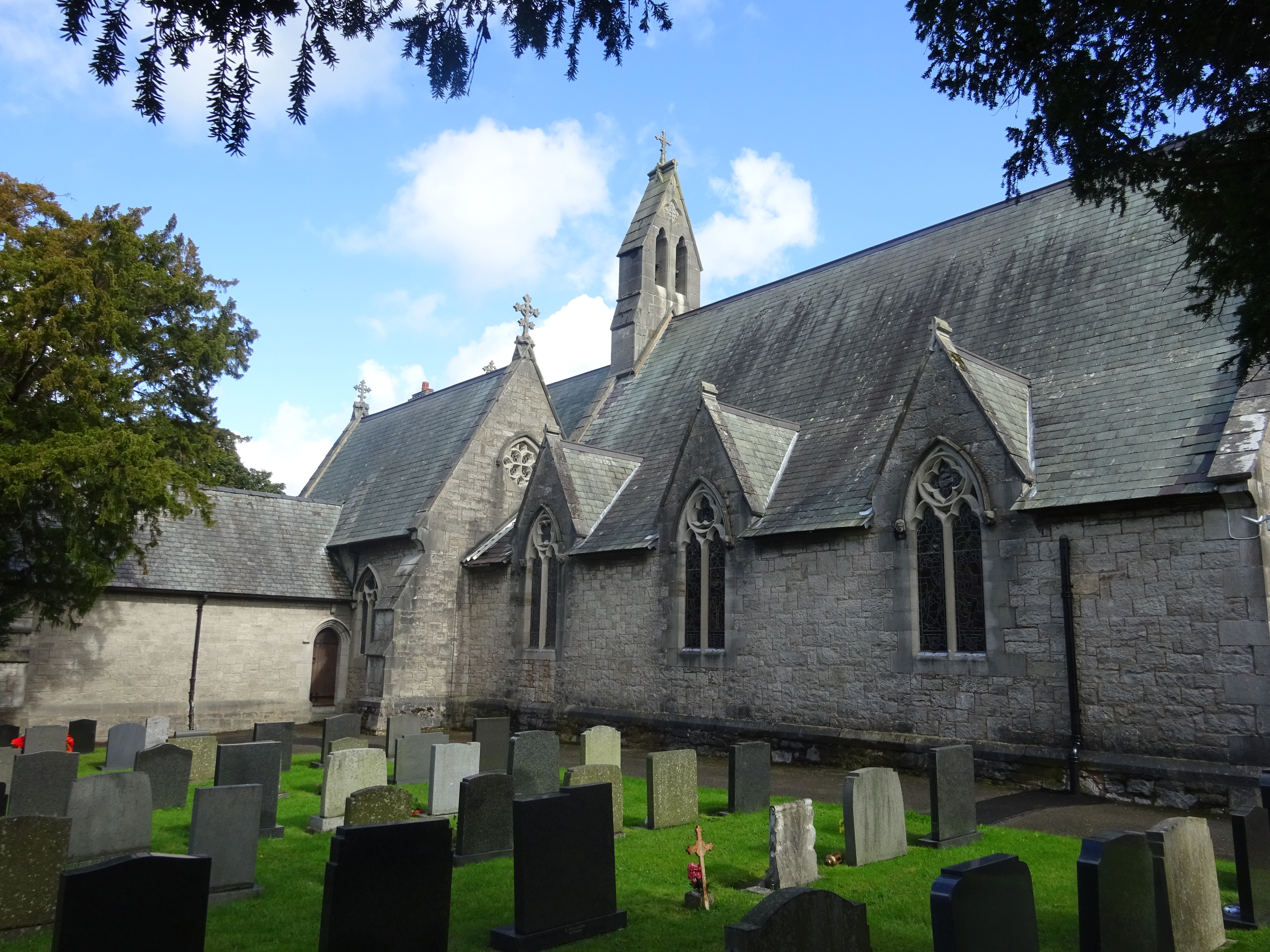
Holy Trinity Church

Holy Trinity Church is a Grade II* listed building in Trefnant, Denbighshire, Wales. It forms part of a group of listed structures in the village, including a parsonage and school, that were designed by George Gilbert Scott and which are recognised as a significant parochial architectural group.

The church was designed by George Gilbert Scott and constructed between 1853-1855 to commemorate the life of John Lloyd Salusbury of Galltfaenan Hall. The works are variously said to have been financed by his two daughters, Mrs Townsend Mainwaring and Mrs Charles Mainwaring, and by the former's husband, Townshend Mainwaring. Giles Gilbert Scott designed a vestry for the church in 1907, which was financed by Charles Salusbury Mainwaring, an heir to Townshend.

Scott senior was also responsible for the design of the parsonage for Holy Trinity, which was constructed in 1860 on land donated by Townshend Mainwaring and is Grade II listed in its own right. The same year saw the construction of Scott's school design in the village, again substantially supported by Townshend Mainwaring; the school opened in February 1861 and is Grade II listed, as is the attached Scott-designed schoolhouse.
