= Trefnant railway station =

Former railway station in Denbighshire, Wales

Trefnant
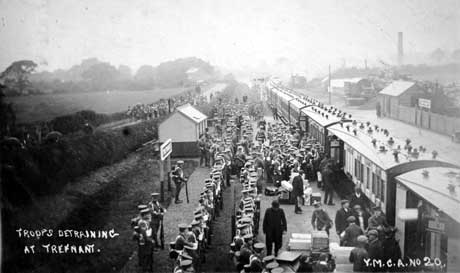
- The 4th Battalion King's Own Royal Lancasters detraining at Trefnant station, 1909

General information
- Location: Trefnant, Denbighshire; Wales
- Coordinates: 53.2250°N 3.4202°W
- Grid reference: SJ051707
- Platforms: 2

Other information
- Status: Disused

History
- Original company: Vale of Clwyd Railway
- Pre-grouping: London and North Western Railway
- Post-grouping: London, Midland and Scottish Railway

Key dates
- 5 October 1858: Opened
- 19 September 1955: Closed to passengers
- 5 August 1957: Closed
Location

Trefnant railway station served the village of Trefnant in North Wales.

== History ==
It opened in 1858 and closed for passengers in 1955 and freight in 1957. Works were commenced in 1864 to double the line between Trefnant and the railway's junction with the Mold and Denbigh line.

The station platform and the siding area was still visible until the Llys Teg housing association estate was built around 1990.

There was a railway bridge at the top of "Hafod" on the A541 in the village which is now demolished but is still visible as a hump in the road.

Preceding station	Disused railways	Following station
Llannerch	London and North Western Railway; Vale of Clwyd Railway	Denbigh
