= Marchwiel Hall =

Country house in Wrexham, Wales

Coordinates: 53.0250°N 2.9792°W

Marchwiel Hall is a Grade II listed building in the village of Marchwiel, Wrexham County Borough in North Wales.

== History ==
Marchwiel Hall was a seat of the Broughton family. By 1837, the house and estate was occupied by Townshend Mainwaring, who then moved to Galltfaenan Hall on his marriage. The current 1840s-built country house has five main reception rooms, a ballroom, and 12 bedrooms, with adjoining stables and outbuildings set on 150 acres (61 ha) of estate grounds. In 1883, its then owner, civil engineer Benjamin Piercy laid out a cricket ground. In 1913, Sir Alfred McAlpine bought the property. Home to the Marchwiel and Wrexham Cricket Club, Alfred developed it as "one of the most picturesque settings for playing the game in the country".
