= Vale of Clwyd Railway =

Former railway line in North Wales

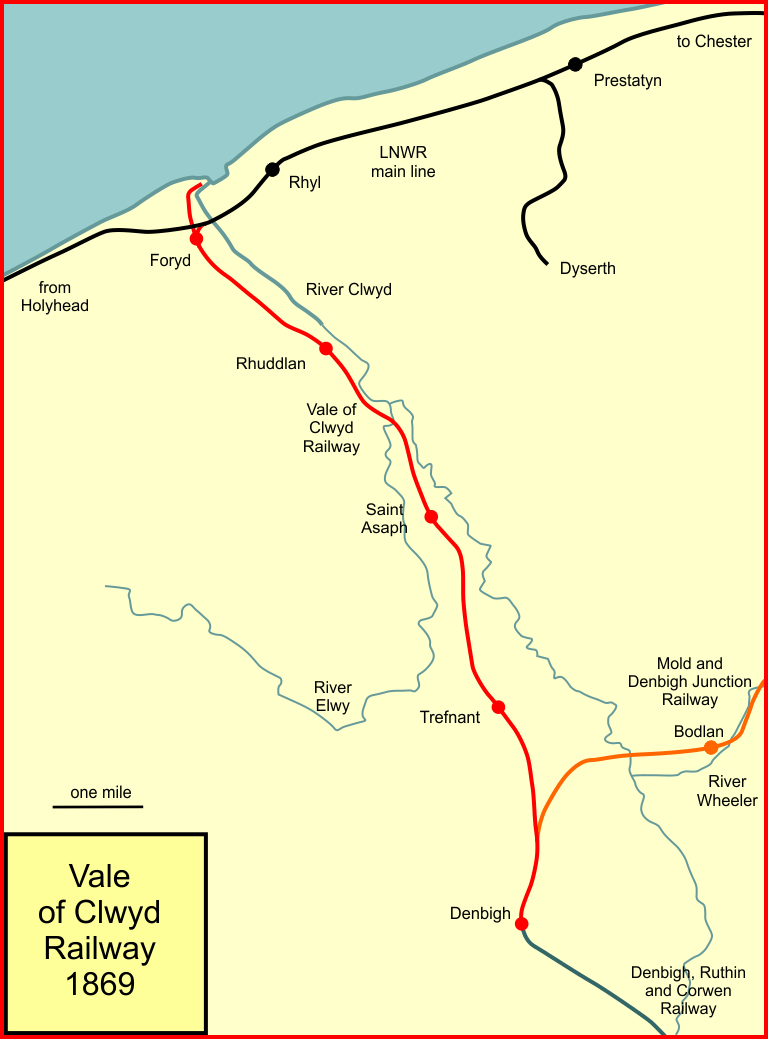

Overview
- Other name: VoCR
- Status: Closed
- Locale: North Wales
- Termini: Rhyl; Denbigh
- Stations: Foryd, Rhuddlan, St Asaph, Llannerch, Trefnant and Denbigh

Service
- Type: Standard gauge
- Operator(s): London and North Western Railway (from 1867)

History
- Commenced: 23 June 1856
- Planned opening: 23 June 1856
- Opened: 5 October 1858
- Completed: 5 October 1858
- Connection to Rhyl: 1 January 1862
- Passengers Closure: 19 September 1955
- Absorbed by LNWR: 15 July 1867
- Closed: 1 January 1968

Technical
- Line length: 10 mi (16 km)
- Number of tracks: Single line with space for double track
- Track gauge: 1,435 mm (4 ft 8 1/2 in) standard gauge

The Vale of Clwyd Railway (VoCR) was a standard-gauge line, which connected the settlements of Rhyl, St Asaph and Denbigh in North Wales. It opened in 1858, at first without a connection to the main line at Rhyl, but this was provided in 1862. At Denbigh, a connection could be made on to the Mold and Denbigh Junction Railway. Although the area became popular with holidaymakers from the 1920s, the line never realised its potential; it closed to passengers in 1955 and completely in 1968.

== Conception ==
The Chester and Holyhead Railway (C&HR) completed its main line in 1850. There was a considerable area of agricultural land south of the line, towards Denbigh, and a number of schemes were put forward to serve the area. The C&HR found itself short of funds to complete its main line, so it was left to independent promoters to put a scheme forward.

Vale of Clwyd Railway Act 1856
- Act of Parliament
- Parliament of the United Kingdom
- Long title: An Act for making a Railway from the Chester and Holyhead Railway at or near to Rhyl in the County of Flint to the Town of Denbigh in the County of Denbigh, to be called "The Vale of Clwyd Railway."
- Citation: 19 & 20 Vict. c. xlv

Dates
- Royal assent: 23 June 1856

Text of statute as originally enacted

This proved to be the Vale of Clwyd Railway, which was authorised by the Vale of Clwyd Railway Act 1856 (19 & 20 Vict. c. xlv) on 23 June 1856. Contracts for construction were awarded to David Davies and Thomas Savin.

== Opening ==
The line was 10 miles (16 km) in length, built as a single line with space on the formation for double track later. Construction was fairly rapid, and the line opened on 5 October 1858, for passengers and goods. There were four trains each way every weekday. The Denbigh station was a temporary structure, and the permanent building opened in December 1860.

Stations were at Foryd, Rhuddlan, St Asaph, Trefnant and Denbigh. A VoCR director, Whitehall Dod, had the right to stop trains adjacent to his estate at Llannerch, a mile north of Trefnant, until December 1871 when that right expired. (Note: Baughan refers to this on page 67 as Nannerch, but he is confusing the name with a station between Mold and Denbigh. Llannerch is properly referred to by Rear, page 57.) There was also a siding for a brickworks at the locality. The siding was extended during World War II for use in connection with an army stores depot.

== Extension to Rhyl ==
In 1860, the company sought powers to enter Rhyl station with their trains; the station was on the main line, now controlled by the London and North Western Railway (LNWR). The LNWR was agreeable, but demanded reciprocal running powers to Denbigh, obviously an unequal trade; as a result, the deal did not go ahead.

Hugh Robert Hughes of Kinmel Hall owned land at Foryd beach and a pier there, from which he operated steamers. He had hoped that the Vale of Clwyd Railway would run to his pier and make connections there, but this would have involved crossing the Chester and Holyhead Railway main line; that company objected, chiefly because they feared competing steamer traffic to Liverpool from Hughes' pier. However, the VoCR had laid a temporary branch siding to the beach from their Foryd station, for the purpose of acquiring track ballast. Hughes took possession of the branch siding, saying that he would use it for ordinary railway purposes and connect with the VoCR at Foryd station.

The C&HR forcibly ejected Hughes' men from the branch line, but Hughes secured an injunction in his favour and the short branch was operated as a full railway to and from the pier. The feared steamers to Liverpool operated in connection. However, the steamer operator discovered that the VoCR was negotiating with the LNWR to lease the line to the larger company; other internal hostilities surfaced and the VoCR was riven with dissension.

== Connections to other lines ==
Denbigh was not destined to be a terminus; the Denbigh, Ruthin and Corwen Railway was authorised on 23 July 1860. This, coupled with the Vale of Llangollen Railway and an extension to Corwen, meant that a viable route from Ruabon and the Great Western Railway could be created.

At this time, there was every likelihood of the Great Western Railway (GWR) reaching Rhyl, an important regional centre, along the lines from Ruabon via Llangollen and Corwen. For some time this seemed inevitable but, in time, the GWR lost interest and the scheme was not pursued.

Vale of Clwyd Railway Act 1861
- Act of Parliament
- Parliament of the United Kingdom
- Long title: An Act to enable the Vale of Clwyd Railway Company to raise additional Capital.
- Citation: 24 & 25 Vict. c. cxcii

Dates
- Royal assent: 22 July 1861

Vale of Clwyd Railway Act 1862
- Act of Parliament
- Parliament of the United Kingdom
- Long title: An Act to enable the Vale of Clwyd Railway Company to extend their Railway to the North-west Shore of the River Clwyd at Foryd; to divert a Portion of the Line of their present Railway; and for other Purposes.
- Citation: 25 & 26 Vict. c. xciii

Dates
- Royal assent: 30 June 1862

Text of statute as originally enacted

On 30 June 1862, the extension sought by the pier owner Hughes was passed in Parliament in the Vale of Clwyd Railway Act 1862 (25 & 26 Vict. c. xciii); now the VoCR could legally reach the beach and a new pier, and a proper junction with the C&HR line (now under LNWR control) could be made. Goods traffic started in the latter half of 1864 and, after some difficulty, the extension was passed for passenger operation, but this was never acted upon.

== Train services ==
In December 1862, the Oswestry Advertiser newspaper reported that additional passenger services would be provided by attaching passenger coaches to goods trains:

"much increased accommodation, making... six trains daily between Rhyl and Denbigh and five between Ruthin and Rhyl... the Company do not of course guarantee exact time with the goods trains, having made these arrangements at the request of several inhabitants... in the Vale."

The LNWR was formally authorised by the London and North Western Railway (Additional Powers) Act 1864 (27 & 28 Vict. c. ccxxvi) to work the VoCR line, as they had been doing informally, and the company was absorbed by the LNWR by the London and North Western Railway (New Works and Additional Powers) Act 1867 (30 & 31 Vict. c. cxliv) of 15 July 1867.

Bradshaw's Guide for 1895 listed the train service; there were six trains each way between Denbigh and Rhyl, calling at all stations. Most of the trains made reasonable connections at Denbigh.

== From railway grouping to closure ==
At the beginning of 1923, the railways of Great Britain were grouped into four new large companies, under the Railways Act 1921. The LNWR was a constituent of the new London Midland and Scottish Railway. Seaside holidays were increasingly popular and the North Wales coast was an attractive destination. The passenger trains service was augmented accordingly and seventeen trains ran each way daily in the summer in the 1930s.

Nevertheless, the line remained a rural outpost and use of the line declined; it was closed to passengers on 19 September 1955 and completely from 1965.

Today, only the northern section of the trackbed remains intact as far as the North Wales Expressway, just before St Asaph station.

== Station list ==
- Foryd Pier; opened August 1859; relocated nearer river mouth 1866; closed 1885;
- Foryd; opened 5 October 1858; replaced by new station opened 20 April 1885 on main line; closed 2 July 1917; reopened 1 July 1919; closed 5 January 1931;
- Rhuddlan; opened 5 October 1858; closed 19 September 1955;
- St Asaph; opened 5 October 1858; closed 19 September 1955;
- Llannerch; opened 5 October 1858; closed December 1871; private stopping place;
- Trefnant; opened 5 October 1858; closed 19 September 1955;
- Mold and Denbigh Junction; convergence of line from Mold;
- Denbigh; opened 5 October 1858; original temporary station was replaced December 1860; closed 30 April 1962.
