= St Asaph railway station =

Railway station in Wales

St Asaph
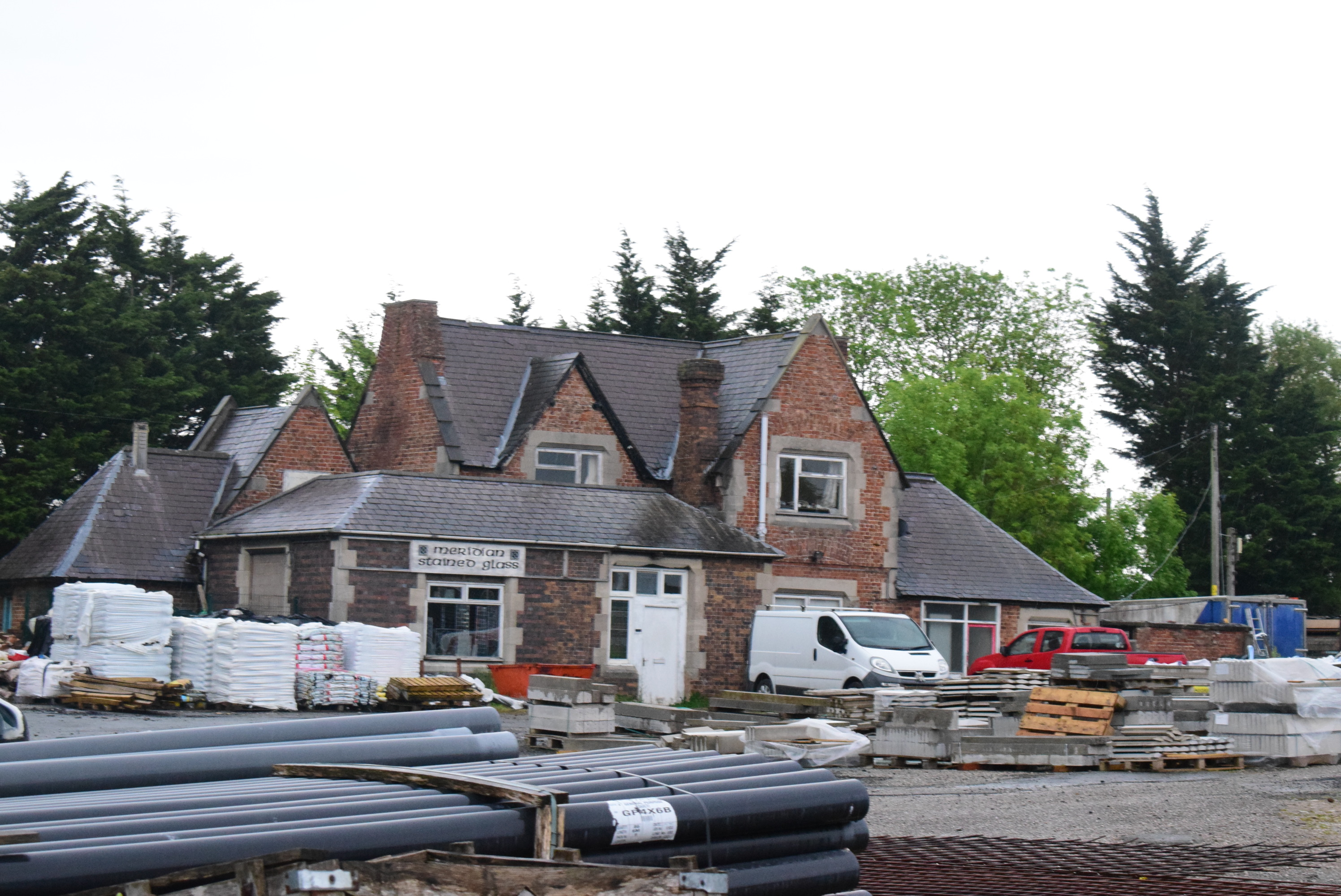
- St Asaph station building

General information
- Location: St Asaph, Denbighshire; Wales
- Coordinates: 53.2581°N 3.4392°W
- Grid reference: SJ040744
- Platforms: 2

Other information
- Status: Disused

History
- Original company: Vale of Clwyd Railway
- Pre-grouping: London and North Western Railway
- Post-grouping: London, Midland and Scottish Railway

Key dates
- 5 October 1858: Opened
- 19 September 1955: Closed to passengers
- 4 May 1964: Closed
Location

St Asaph railway station served the city of St Asaph in Denbighshire, Wales. It was opened by the Vale of Clwyd Railway (later absorbed into the London and North Western Railway) on 5 October 1858 and closed on 19 September 1955. The station building and northbound platform are now a private residence.

Preceding station	Disused railways	Following station
Rhuddlan	London and North Western Railway; Vale of Clwyd Railway	Llannerch
