= Ricciotti =

Ricciotti is both an Italian surname and a masculine Italian given name. Notable people with the name include:

- Abbot Giuseppe Ricciotti, C.R.L., (1890–1964), Italian canon regular, Biblical scholar and archeologist
- Ricciotti Garibaldi (1847–1924), Italian soldier, the fourth son of Giuseppe Garibaldi and Anita Garibaldi
- Ricciotti Greatti (born 1939), Italian former footballer
- Rudy Ricciotti (born 1952), French architect and publisher

== See also ==
- Ricciotto Canudo
