= Castle Hotel, Aberaeron =

Grade II listed building in Aberaeron, UK

Coordinates: 52.2423°N 4.2592°W

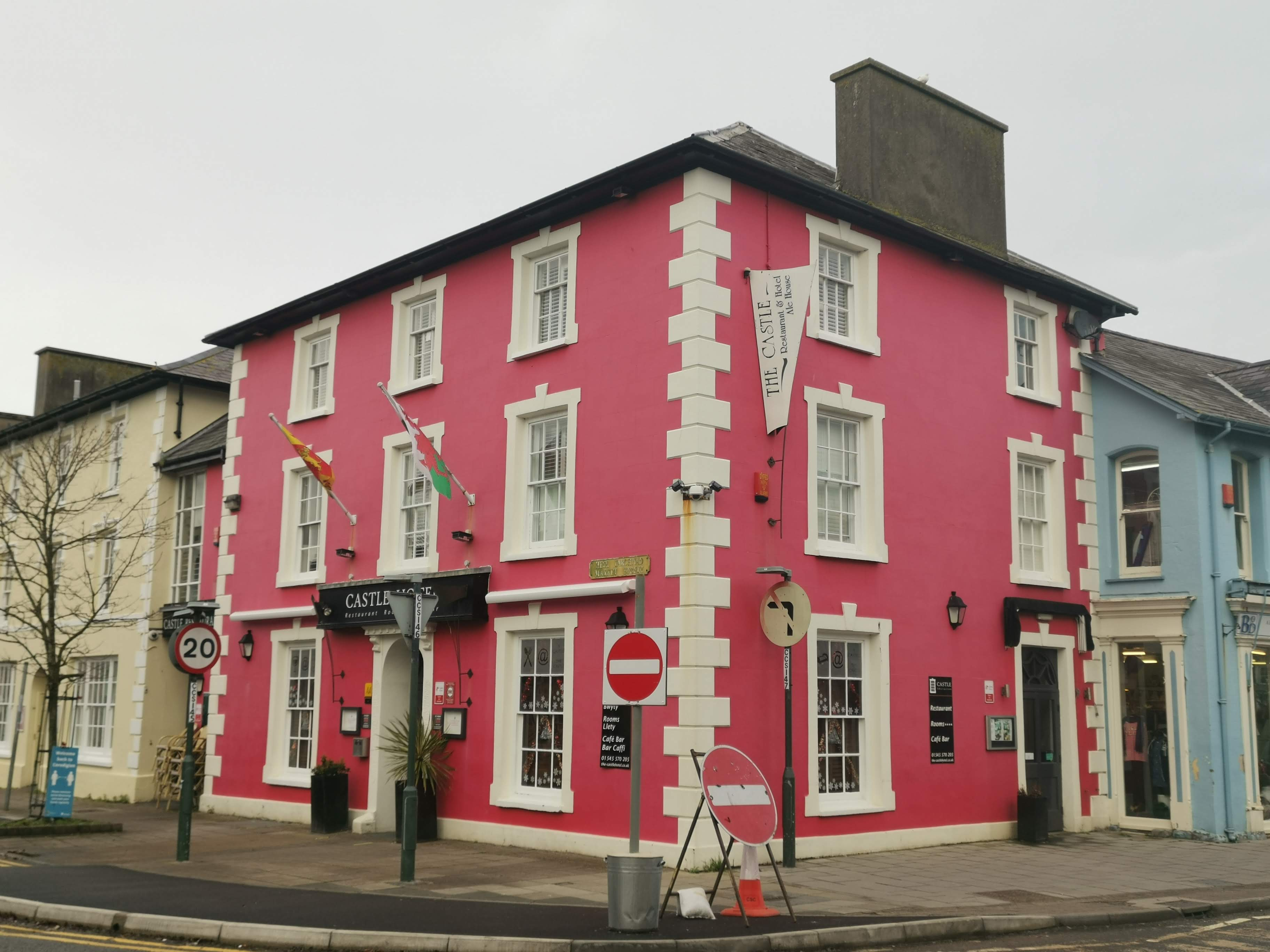
Castle Hotel

The Castle Hotel, Aberaeron is located in a Grade II listed building in the coastal town of Aberaeron, Ceredigion, West Wales. The building is part of the original 19th century planned town and is located near the town harbour. It continues to operate as a pub and hotel.

In recent times the interior decor of the building was updated interior designer Ann Hughes, who also designed the Harbourmaster Hotel. The hotel regularly takes part in the annual Aberaeron Seafood Festival. The hotel received a grant from the Welsh Assembly Government in 2008, and in 2011 won Bronze in the local 'Curiad Calon' Healthy Food scheme.
