= Galltfaenan Hall =

Building in Denbighshire, Wales

Coordinates: 53°12′56″N 3°27′31″W

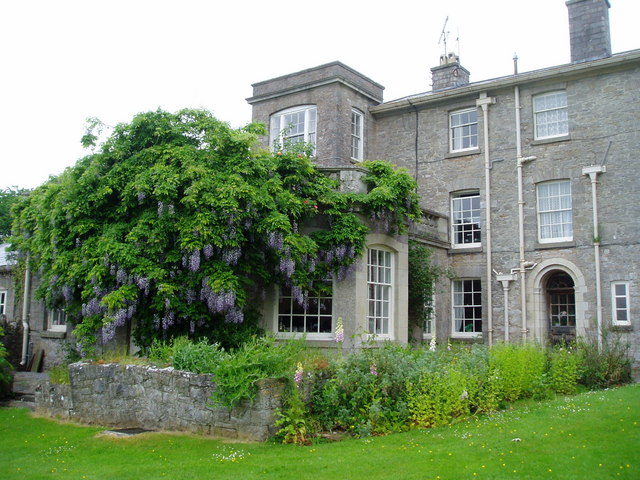
Galltfaenan Hall in 2006

Gallfaenan Hall, also known as Alltvaynan, is a Grade II listed building near to Trefnant and Henllan in Denbighshire, Wales.

Gallt is a Welsh word that can mean "Wooded hillside" and "Faenan" is a mutation of the word Maenan. Maenan means "Place of the big stone" and in the area, equates to "Manor House". "Manor house on the wooded hillside" describes the property well.

The site was established by the 16th century, when a branch of the Salusbury family bought it from the Ravenscroft family and made it their seat. The direct line of the Salusbury branch ended in 1791 and the estate passed to a cousin's son, Colonel John Lloyd, on condition that he adopted the Salusbury arms and name. Following his marriage in 1810, the building was probably much altered, including by the construction of a Regency-style entrance that still exists.

The house passed to the cousin's daughter, Anna Maria Salusbury, on his death. She married Townshend Mainwaring of Marchwiel Hall, who at various times was a Member of Parliament, Justice of the Peace and High Sheriff of Denbighshire. It was again remodelled in the 1860s, using designs by the Denbigh firm of Lloyd Williams and Underwood that included a galleried stair hall. The estate, which comprised 10,686 acres (4,324 ha) in 1873, was then inherited ones of their sons, Charles Salusbury Mainwaring, who in turn bequeathed it to Randle Kynaston Lloyd Salusbury Mainwaring.

Gallfaenan next passed out of the Mainwaring family to Ernest Tate, the sugar magnate, in 1926. He arranged the construction of an additional wing designed by F. C. Saxon, with other interior work by Waring and Gillow.

As of 2019, Galltfaenan was in use as a care home.
