= The Old Rectory, Llanbedr =

The Old Rectory
- Maes Derwen
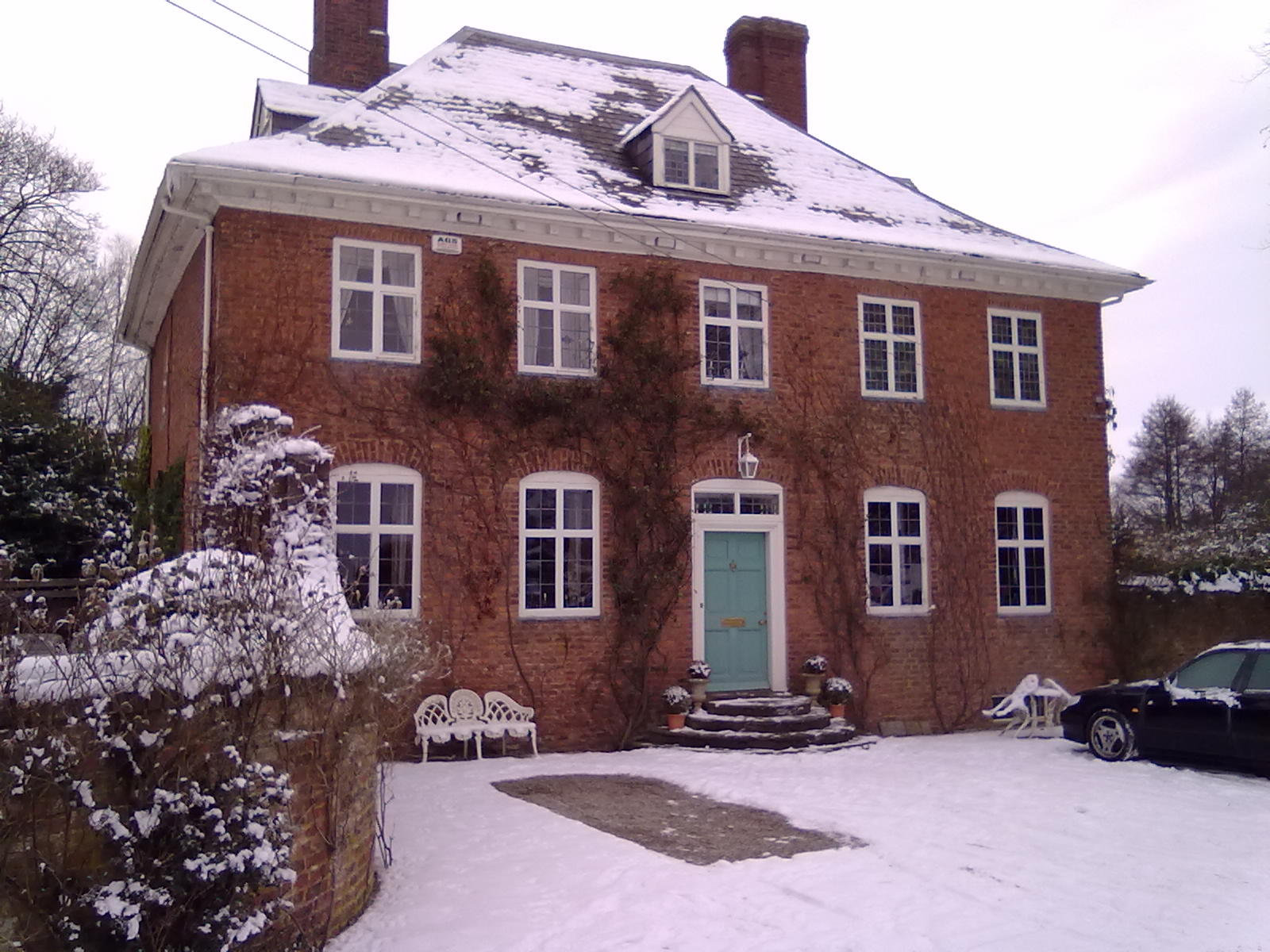
- The front, with views of the Clwydian Hills
- Interactive map of the The Old Rectory area
- Former names: Yr Hen Reithordy

General information
- Type: Country house
- Location: Ruthin, Wales
- Coordinates: 53.1286°N 3.2860°W
- Groundbreaking: 1690s

Design and construction
- Designations: Grade II* listed

The Old Rectory, Llanbedr is located two miles north-east of the market town of Ruthin, Denbighshire, around 400 m north of the quiet village of Llanbedr and is a late 17th-century property, of a type rare in the county. It was listed as Grade II* on 19 July 1966 (Cadw Building ID: 1352). The front has five bays and is a double pile of mellow red brick, with a hipped roof. It is set back down a quiet and private country lane. The village school is around 200 m in the other direction.

The central well staircase is of oak, rising through two storeys. It has the original oak flooring in all but the reception room, which has rich patterned Victorian tiles, with a central carpet motif from the old church at the nearby village. The house has timber cross windows and leaded glazing. The rooms inside are laid out in a classic dolls' house style. The sitting room has original oak "raised and fielded" paneling.

Outside, there is a dovecote which is Listed as Grade II and a gazebo, which is also Grade II. East of the house, a line of Iron Age hill forts crown the Clwydian Hills.

The house was sold by the Church in Wales around 30 years ago
