= Trefnant =

Village in Denbighshire, Wales

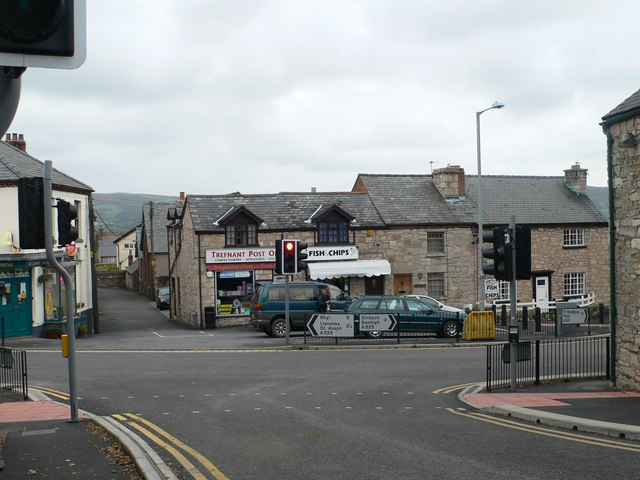
- The junction of the A525 and the B5428 roads

- Location within Denbighshire
- Population: 1,581 (2011 Census)
- OS grid reference: SJ046709
- Community: Trefnant
- Principal area: Denbighshire
- Preserved county: Clwyd
- Country: Wales
- Sovereign state: United Kingdom
- Post town: DENBIGH
- Postcode district: LL16
- Post town: ST. ASAPH
- Postcode district: LL17
- Dialling code: 01745
- Police: North Wales
- Fire: North Wales
- Ambulance: Welsh
- UK Parliament: Clwyd North
- Senedd Cymru – Welsh Parliament: Vale of Clwyd
- List of places UK Wales Denbighshire 53.227°N 3.429°W Map of the community

Trefnant is a village and community in Denbighshire, Wales. It is located on the A525 road in the Vale of Clwyd (Dyffryn Clwyd), about halfway between St Asaph (Llanelwy) to the north and Denbigh to the south. At the 2001 Census, the community had a population of 1,409, increasing to 1,581 at the 2011 Census.

Holy Trinity Church, designed by George Gilbert Scott, is a Grade II* listed building in the village. It was erected to commemorate the life of John Lloyd Salusbury, of Galltfaenan Hall. It forms part of a significant group of listed Scott-designed structures in the village, which include a school and parsonage.

Nearby is Llannerch Hall.

Trefnant railway station served the village. It closed in the 1960s. Also Llannerch railway station was located nearby at Llannerch Hall. It closed in 1871.

Welsh language author and polemicist Emrys ap Iwan was a minister at Trefnant at the end of the 19th century.

Green Methodist Chapel was built in 1824. Built in the simple Gothic style, gable entry type.

Trefnant used to have a football team called Trefnant Village FC. They dropped out of the Clwyd League due to a cash crisis. They have a Summer league team which won the first summer title in 1927 and they last won a trophy in 2004, the shield, beating Henllan in the final.

== Governance ==
An electoral ward in the same name exists. This ward stretches beyond the boundaries of the Community and the total population taken at the 2011 Census was 1,970.
