= Castle Hotel, Ruthin =

Building in Denbighshire, Wales

Castle Hotel
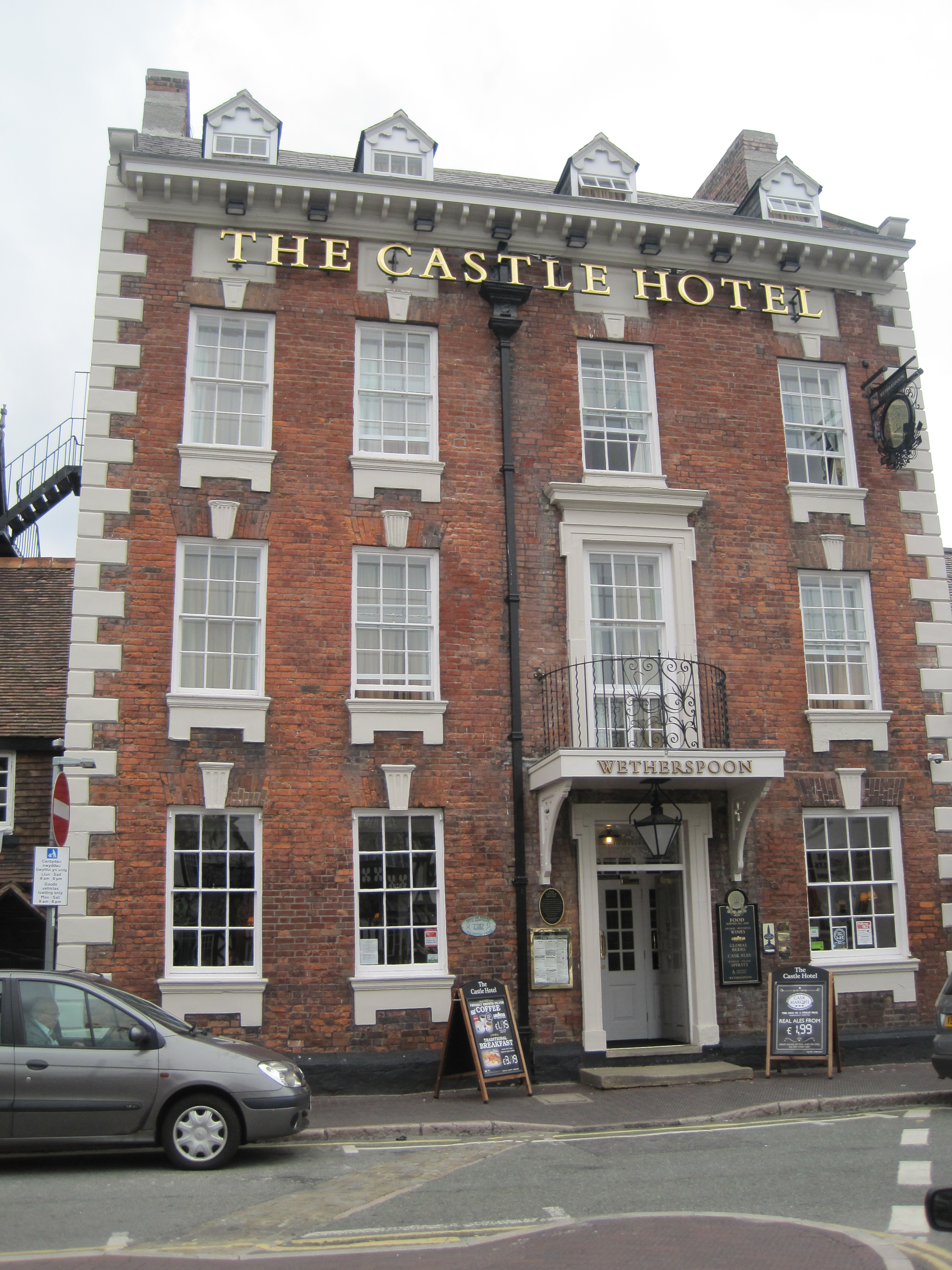

- Location within Wales

General information
- Status: Completed
- Location: Ruthin, Denbighshire, St Peters Square, Ruthin, Denbighshire, LL15 1AA, Wales
- Coordinates: 53.114651°N 3.310229°W
- Owner: J D Wetherspoon

References
- Cadw 917

Castle Hotel is a Grade II* listed building in the community of Ruthin, Denbighshire, Wales. It is in St Peter's Square, which is in the centre of the town. It was listed by Cadw (Reference Number 917).

The building is a 3-storey brick construction dating back to the early 18th century. It was originally a coaching inn between Chester and Holyhead, and was known as the White Lion. In 2011, it was purchased by the hotel chain J D Wetherspoon.
