= Llannerch Hall =

Country house in Denbighshire, Wales

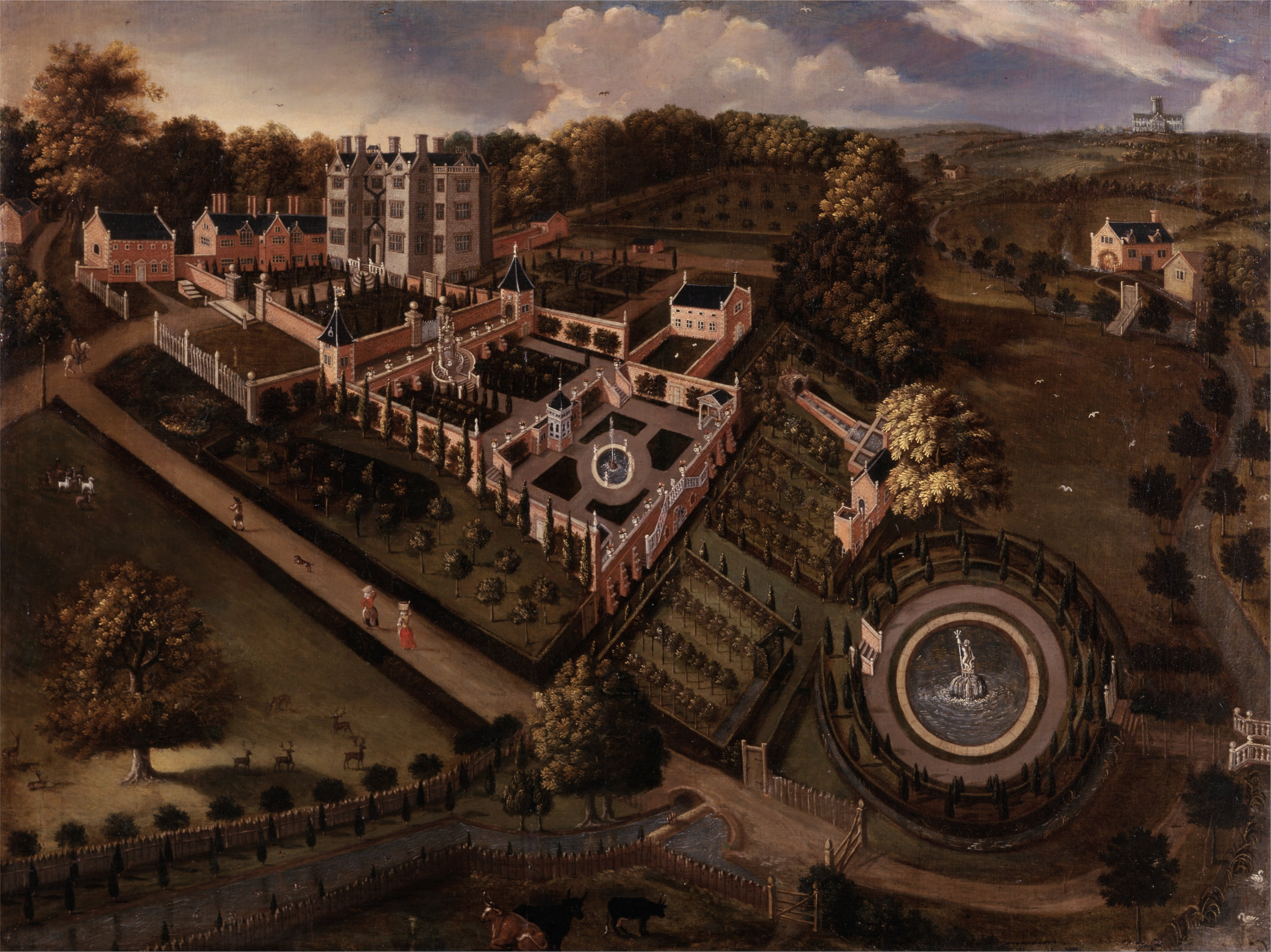
- Painting, c. 1662, showing the Italianate terraced gardens constructed in a "foreign, outrageously unnatural style"

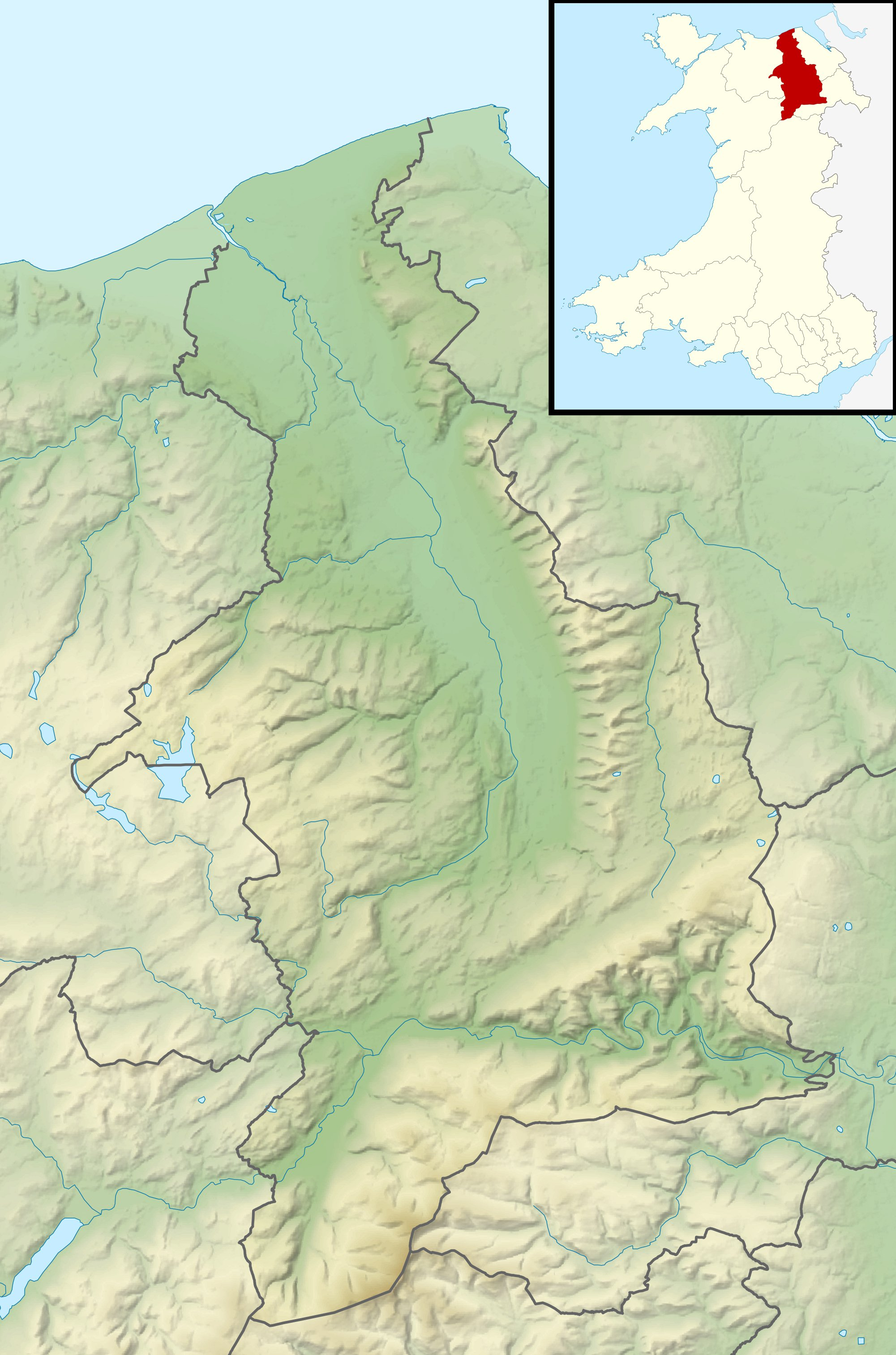
- Location within Denbighshire
- 53.2394°N 3.4187°W
- Type: House
- Location: Trefnant, Clwyd, Wales

History
- Built: Medieval origins, rebuilt twice in the 17th century, again in the 19th century

Site notes
- Architectural style: Italianate
- Governing body: Privately owned

Listed Building – Grade II*
- Official name: No 1 Llannerch Hall
- Designated: 2 June 1983
- Reference no.: 260

Listed Building – Grade II*
- Official name: Temple, loggia and terraces east of Llannerch Hall including gates and walls to forecourt
- Designated: 2 June 1983
- Reference no.: 261

Llannerch Hall, Trefnant, Clwyd, Wales, is a country house with medieval origins. It was rebuilt twice at the beginning and at the end of the 17th century, was again rebuilt in the 19th century, and further modified in the 20th. The hall is now divided into flats, each with its own Grade II* listing. The parkland, now a golf course, conceals traces of a late 17th century Italianate terraced garden that rivalled those at Powis Castle. The gardens were entirely destroyed in the 19th century rebuilding. The house remains privately owned.

== History ==
The site of Llannerch Hall has been occupied since medieval times and was formerly called Lleweni Vechan. In the Tudor period, a house on the site was described by its owner, the Welsh-language poet Gryffydd ap Ieuan, as "a high-crested, too long sided, loose-eaved, short-raftered, rambling, soot-accumulating old ornament of ancient workmanship". In the early 17th century the Llannerch estate came into the possession of Peter Mutton. (Note: Sources vary as to whether Mutton bought the estate, or inherited it.) Mutton, the son of minor Welsh gentry, pursued a successful career as a lawyer, becoming Clerk of the Crown for Denbigh and Montgomery, Attorney General for Wales and The Marches, and a knight. His son, Mutton Davies, was a soldier, and the Continental gardens he saw on foreign tours encouraged him to create a spectacular terraced garden at Llannerch in the early 1660s. Elisabeth Whittle, in her study The Historic Gardens of Wales, records a pool with a statue of Neptune, grottoes, cascades and gazebos, and suggests that the "foreign, outrageously unnatural style" employed led to a garden that, in its day, rivalled that at Powis Castle as "one of the most spectacular in Wales". (Note: The 1662 painting of the garden at Llannerch illustrates the front cover of Elisabeth Whittle's volume, The Historic Gardens of Wales.)

In the mid 19th century, the hall was largely rebuilt, taking on broadly its present appearance. The 17th century gardens were almost completely destroyed. In the early 20th century, the then owners, Captain and Mrs Piers Jones, employed Percy Stephen Cane to undertake further remodelling of the grounds. In the 21st century, Llannerch Hall is divided into thirteen flats, all privately owned.

== Architecture and description ==
Llannerch Hall is of three storeys, and comprises a central block with 19th and 20th century extensions. The style of the Victorian rebuilding has not found favour with critics. John Claudius Loudon, horticulturalist and historian of the Picturesque was not impressed, describing the estate as "much modernised and the fine old house too much so". Edward Hubbard, in his Clwyd volume of the Buildings of Wales series, called it "dour, Italianate, cement rendered".

=== Listing designations ===
Llannerch Hall is a Grade II* listed building. Unusually, each of the thirteen flats into which the building is currently divided has its own separate listing: No. 1, No.2, No.3, No.4, No.5, No.6, No.7, No.8, No.9, No.10, No.11, No.12, and No.13. (Note: Cadw follows the same approach with the Victoria Terrace, Beaumaris, where Nos. 1-20 each has its own Grade I listing.)

In addition, a considerable number of buildings and structures on the wider estate are listed. These include: the temple, loggia, terraces and other works carried out by Percy Cane in the 20th century; the coach house, clock tower, and a barn; the Middle, and Bottom Lodges; and two bridges, all of which are listed at Grade II.

The garden itself is listed Grade II on the Cadw/ICOMOS Register of Parks and Gardens of Special Historic Interest in Wales.

== Sources ==
- Hubbard, Edward (2003). Clwyd (Denbighshire and Flintshire). The Buildings of Wales. New Haven and London: Yale University Press. ISBN 978-0-300-09627-9. OCLC 315792534.
- Whittle, Elisabeth (1992). The Historic Gardens of Wales. Cardiff: CADW. ISBN 9780117015784. OCLC 611958059.
- Williams, W. R. (1895). The Parliamentary History of the Principality of Wales. Brecon: Edwin Davies & Bell. OCLC 31796113.
